= Banyo railway station =

Railway station in Queensland, Australia

Banyo
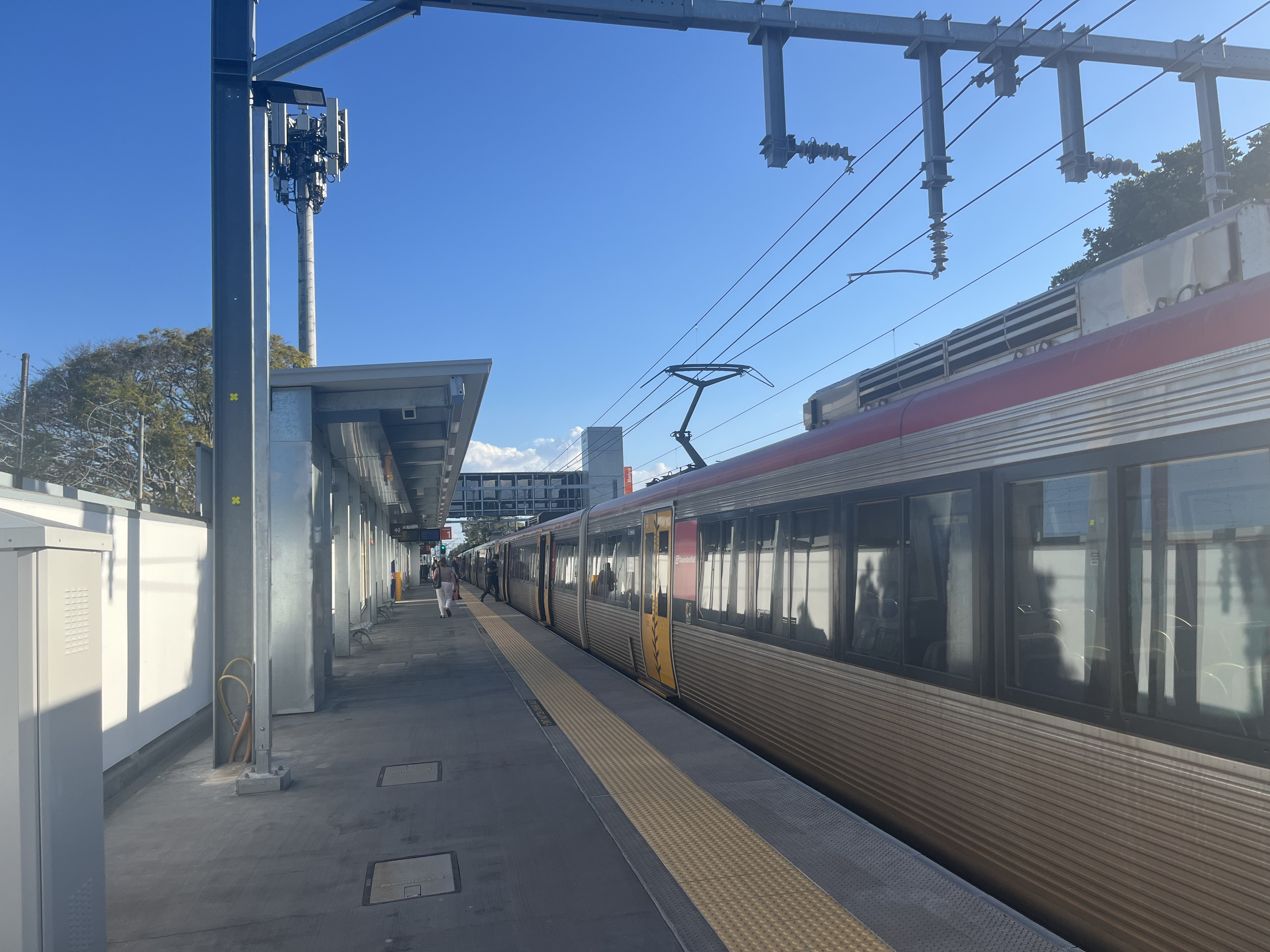
- Southbound view from Platform 1 in September 2026

General information
- Location: St Vincents Road, Banyo; Australia
- Coordinates: 27°22′27″S 153°04′39″E
- Owner: Queensland Rail
- Operator: Queensland Rail
- Line: T4 Shorncliffe
- Distance: 12.05 kilometres from Central
- Platforms: 2 (2 side)
- Tracks: 2

Construction
- Structure type: Ground
- Parking: 27 bays
- Cycle facilities: Yes
- Accessible: Assisted

Other information
- Status: Staffed
- Station code: 600413 (platform 1); 600414 (platform 2)
- Fare zone: Zone 2
- Website: Queensland Rail

History
- Opened: 1882
- Rebuilt: 26 May 2025
- Former names: Clapham Junction

Services
Preceding station	Queensland Rail	Following station
Bindha towards Cleveland	Shorncliffe line	Nudgee towards Shorncliffe
Location

Banyo is a railway station operated by Queensland Rail on the Shorncliffe line. It opened in 1882 and serves the Brisbane suburb of Banyo. It is a ground level station, featuring two side platforms.

== History ==
The station was built in 1882 on the Sandgate railway line (now the Shorncliffe line). At that time, it was expected that this station would be the junction for the future North Coast railway line and was named Clapham Junction railway station. However it was later decided that junction would be at Northgate railway station and in 1897 it was renamed Banyo railway station.

=== 2012 truck collision ===
On 14 September 2012, a loaded semi-trailer was stuck on the level crossing at the station, when a northbound train collided with the vehicle, which caused it to be thrown into a southbound service. Rail services on the Shorncliffe railway line were disrupted for the rest of the day while the rail safety regulator investigated the collision.

=== 2024 station upgrade ===
Banyo station temporarily closed on 22 January 2024 for an accessibility upgrade, which included a new footbridge with lift access and full-length, high-level platforms. It reopened on 26 May 2025. During the accessibility upgrade, services did not stop at the station.

== Services ==
Banyo station is served by all stops Shorncliffe line services from Shorncliffe to Roma Street, Cannon Hill, Manly and Cleveland.

== Platforms and services ==
Banyo platform arrangement
Platform	Line	Destination	Notes
1	T4 Shorncliffe	Roma Street (to Cleveland line)	
2	T4 Shorncliffe	Shorncliffe	
