= Boondall railway station =

Railway station in Queensland, Australia

Boondall
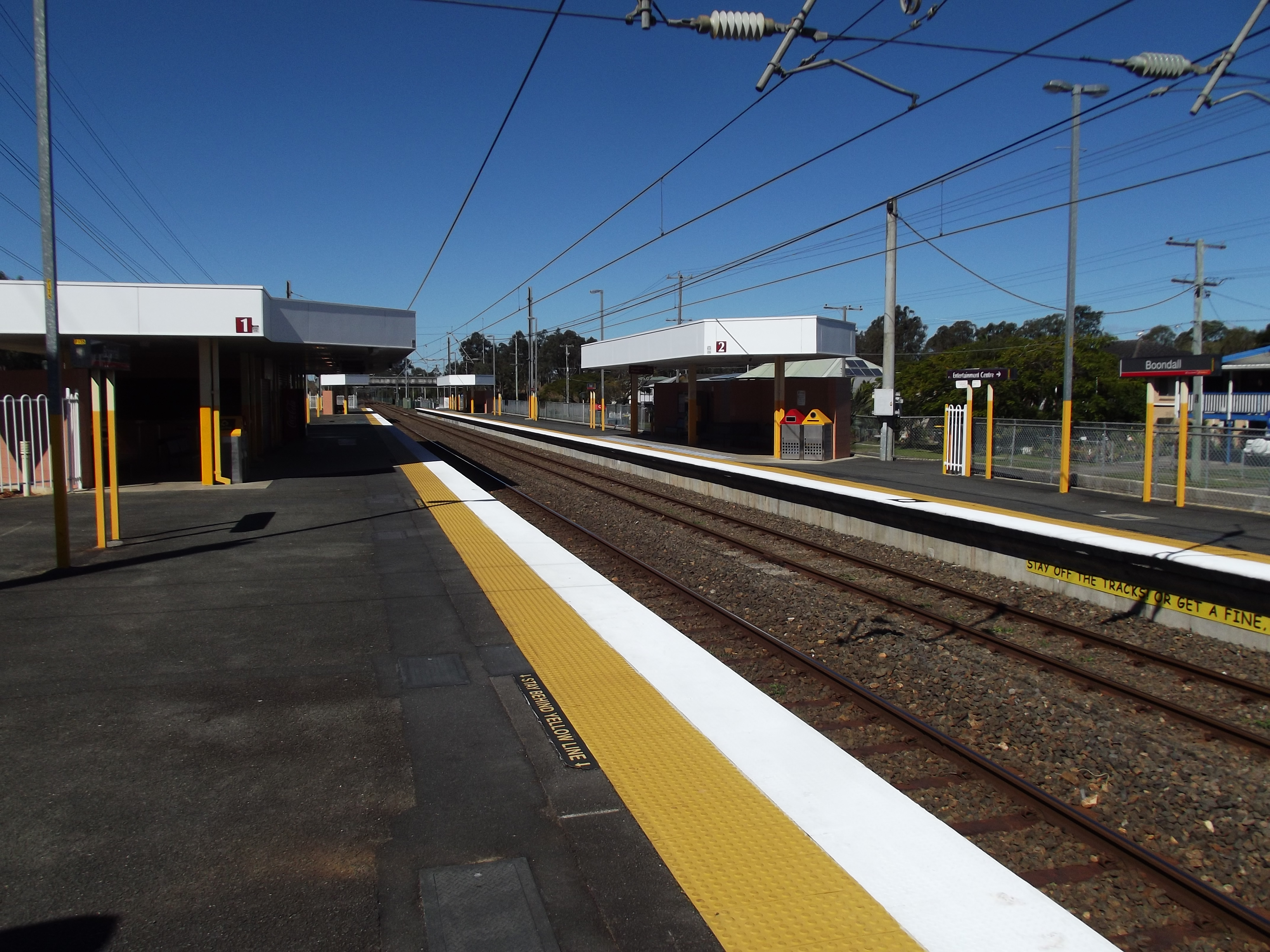
- Southbound view from Platform 1 in July 2012

General information
- Location: Aberdeen Parade, Boondall
- Coordinates: 27°20′47″S 153°04′04″E
- Owner: Queensland Rail
- Operator: Queensland Rail
- Line: T4 Shorncliffe
- Distance: 16 kilometres from Central
- Platforms: 2 (2 side)
- Tracks: 2

Construction
- Structure type: Ground
- Parking: 539 bays
- Accessible: Yes

Other information
- Status: Staffed part time
- Station code: 600417 (platform 1); 600418 (platform 2)
- Fare zone: Zone 2
- Website: Queensland Rail

History
- Opened: 1986

Services
Preceding station	Queensland Rail	Following station
Nudgee towards Cleveland via Roma Street	T4 Shorncliffe line	North Boondall towards Shorncliffe
Location

Boondall is a railway station operated by Queensland Rail on the Shorncliffe line. It opened in 1986 and serves the Brisbane suburb of Boondall. It is a ground level station, featuring two side platforms.

== Services ==
Boondall station is served by all stops Shorncliffe line services from Shorncliffe to Roma Street, Cannon Hill, Manly and Cleveland.

== Platforms and services ==
Boondall platform arrangement
Platform	Line	Destination	Notes
1	T4 Shorncliffe	Roma Street (to Cleveland line)	
2	T4 Shorncliffe	Shorncliffe	
