= Doboy railway station =

Former railway station in Brisbane, Queensland, Australia

Doboy
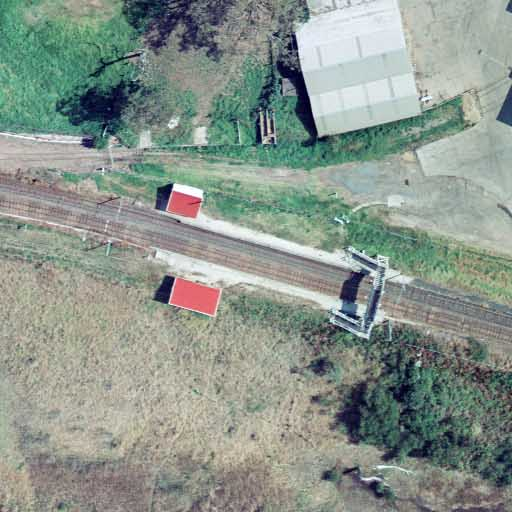
- Aerial view in 1992

General information
- Location: Murarrie
- Coordinates: 27.4531°S 153.1153°E
- Line: Cleveland line
- Platforms: 2 side

Other information
- Fare zone: 3

History
- Closed: 1993
- Former names: Birt's Siding; Buruda

Services
Preceding station	Queensland Rail	Following station
Murarrie towards Shorncliffe via Roma Street	Cleveland line	Hemmant towards Cleveland
Location

Doboy railway station was a former railway station on QR Citytrain suburban network in Brisbane, the state capital of Queensland, Australia. It was located between Murarrie and Hemmant stations on the Cleveland railway line.

== History ==
Originally named Birt's Siding, changed in 1910 to Buruda(Burata), the Aboriginal word for forest oak, it was renamed as Doboy railway station in 1929. The station consisted of two short platforms and a pedestrian overbridge, and was predominantly used by workers at the nearby meatworks.

Doboy railway station closed in 1993, after the closure of the meatworks in 1992.
