= Deagon railway station =

Railway station in Queensland, Australia

Deagon
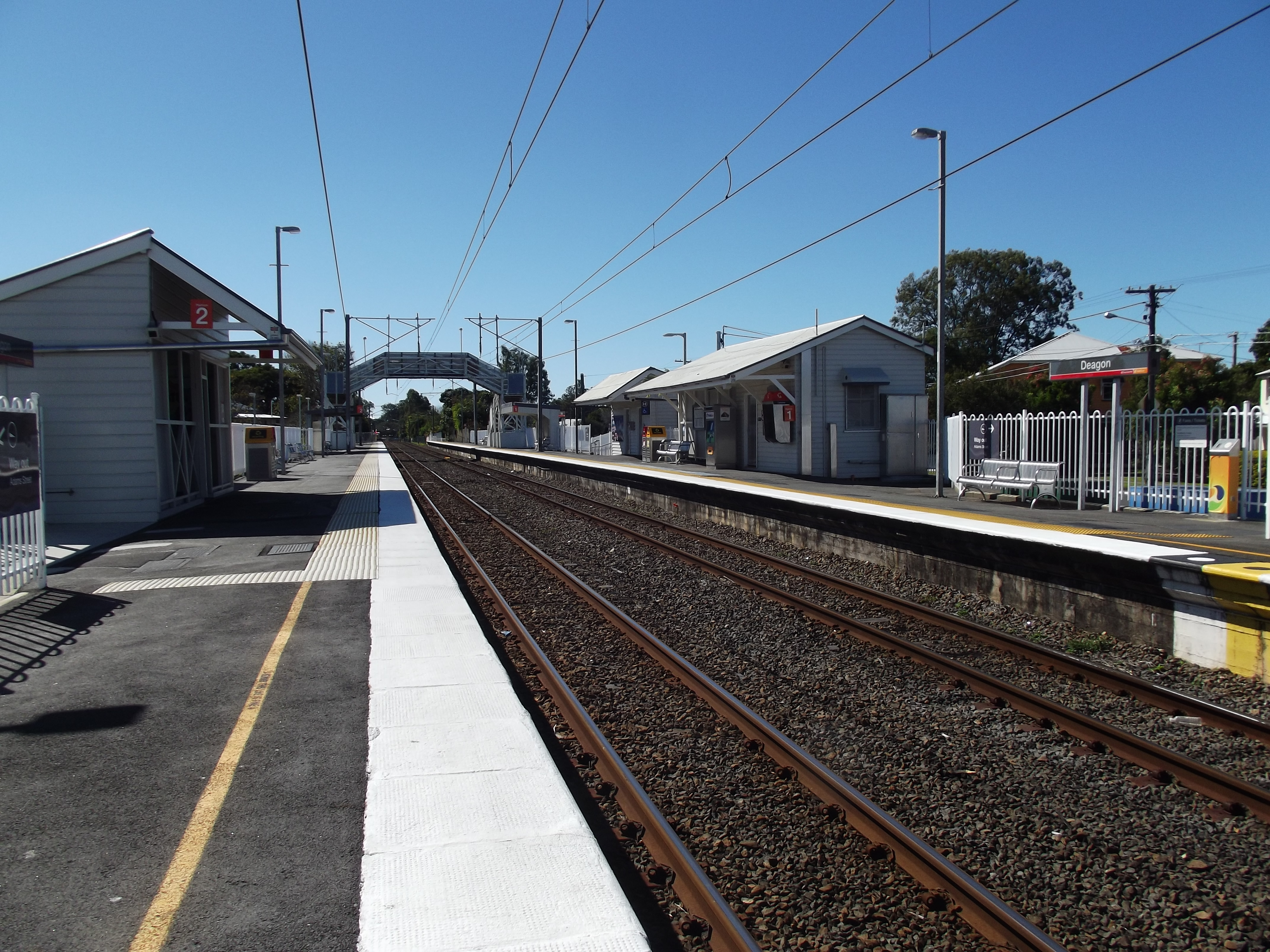
- Northbound view from Platform 2 in July 2012

General information
- Location: Adams Street, Deagon
- Coordinates: 27.3276°S 153.0633°E
- Owner: Queensland Rail
- Operator: Queensland Rail
- Line: T4 Shorncliffe
- Distance: 18.44 kilometres from Central
- Platforms: 2 (2 side)
- Tracks: 2

Construction
- Structure type: Ground
- Parking: 118 bays
- Cycle facilities: Yes
- Accessible: Yes

Other information
- Status: Staffed part time
- Station code: 600421 (platform 1); 600422 (platform 2)
- Fare zone: Zone 2
- Website: Queensland Rail

History
- Opened: 1887

Services
Preceding station	Queensland Rail	Following station
North Boondall towards Cleveland via Roma Street	T4 Shorncliffe line	Sandgate towards Shorncliffe
Location

Deagon is a railway station operated by Queensland Rail on the Shorncliffe line. It opened in 1887 and serves the Brisbane suburb of Deagon. It is a ground level station, featuring two side platforms.

== History ==
In 1887, the station was established as a stopping place between Cabbage Tree (now Boondall) and Sandgate. It was named by the Queensland Railways after William Deagon, a local businessman and local government council member. William Deagon owned the Sandgate Hotel, a stopping place for the Cobb & Co coaches. He was Mayor of Sandgate from 1882 to 1884.

== Services ==
Deagon station is served by all stops Shorncliffe line services from Shorncliffe to Roma Street, Cannon Hill, Manly and Cleveland.

== Platforms and services ==
Deagon platform arrangement
Platform	Line	Destination	Notes
1	T4 Shorncliffe	Roma Street (to Cleveland line)	
2	T4 Shorncliffe	Shorncliffe	
