= Nudgee railway station =

Railway station in Queensland, Australia

Nudgee
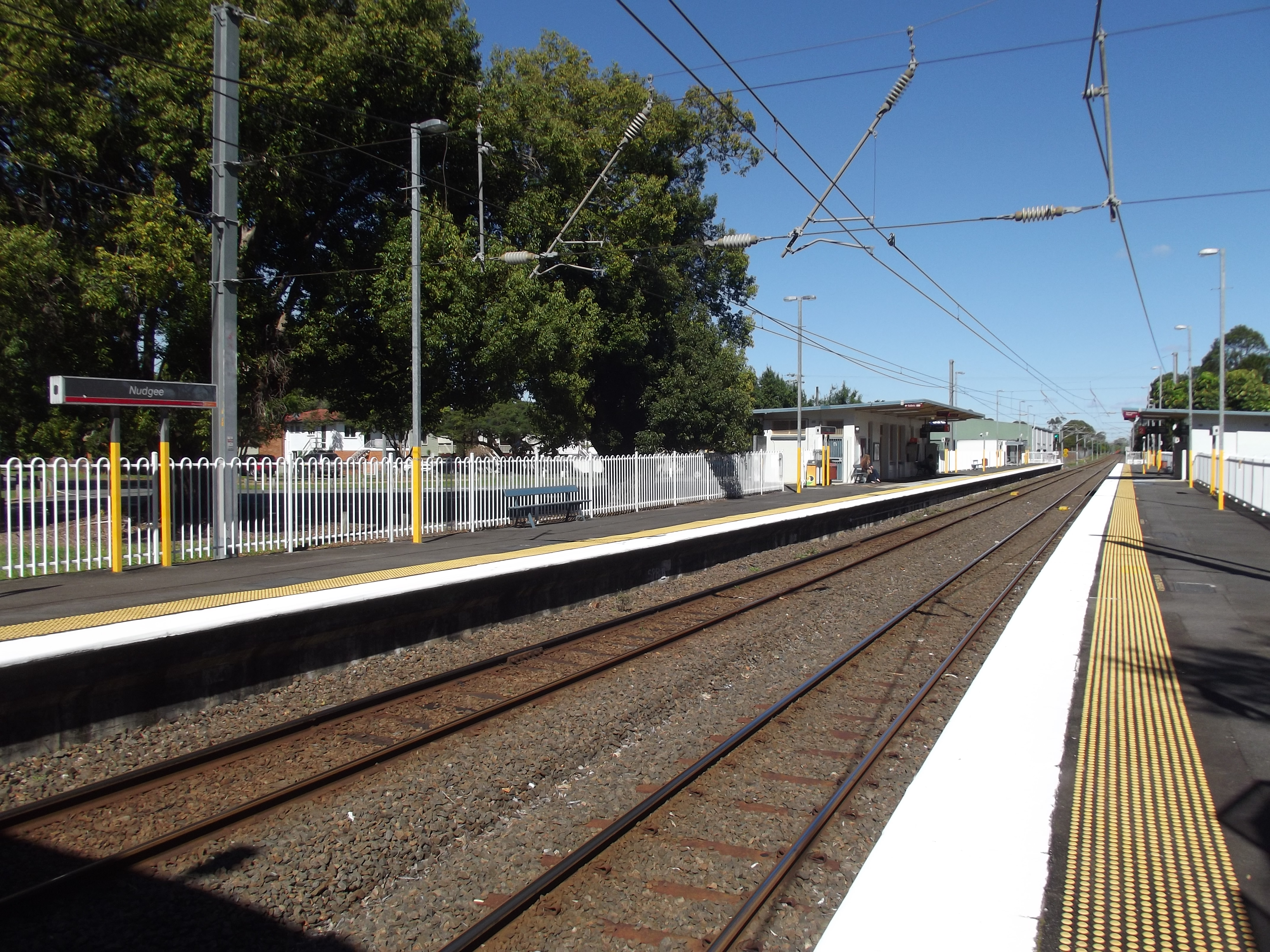
- Southbound view from Platform 2 in July 2012

General information
- Location: Railway Street, Nudgee
- Coordinates: 27°21′57″S 153°05′01″E
- Owner: Queensland Rail
- Operator: Queensland Rail
- Line: T4 Shorncliffe
- Distance: 13.12 kilometres from Central
- Platforms: 2 (2 side)
- Tracks: 2

Construction
- Structure type: Ground
- Parking: 20 bays
- Accessible: Assisted

Other information
- Status: Staffed part time
- Station code: 600415 (platform 1); 600416 (platform 2)
- Fare zone: Zone 2
- Website: Queensland Rail

Services
Preceding station	Queensland Rail	Following station
Banyo towards Cleveland via Roma Street	T4 Shorncliffe line	Boondall towards Shorncliffe
Location

Nudgee is a railway station operated by Queensland Rail on the Shorncliffe line. It opened in 1882 and serves the Brisbane suburb of Nudgee. It is a ground level station, featuring two side platforms.

== Services ==
Nudgee station is served by all stops Shorncliffe line services from Shorncliffe to Roma Street, Cannon Hill, Manly and Cleveland

== Platforms and services ==
Nudgee platform arrangement
Platform	Line	Destination	Notes
1	T4 Shorncliffe	Roma Street (to Cleveland line)	
2	T4 Shorncliffe	Shorncliffe	
