= North Boondall railway station =

Railway station in Queensland, Australia

North Boondall
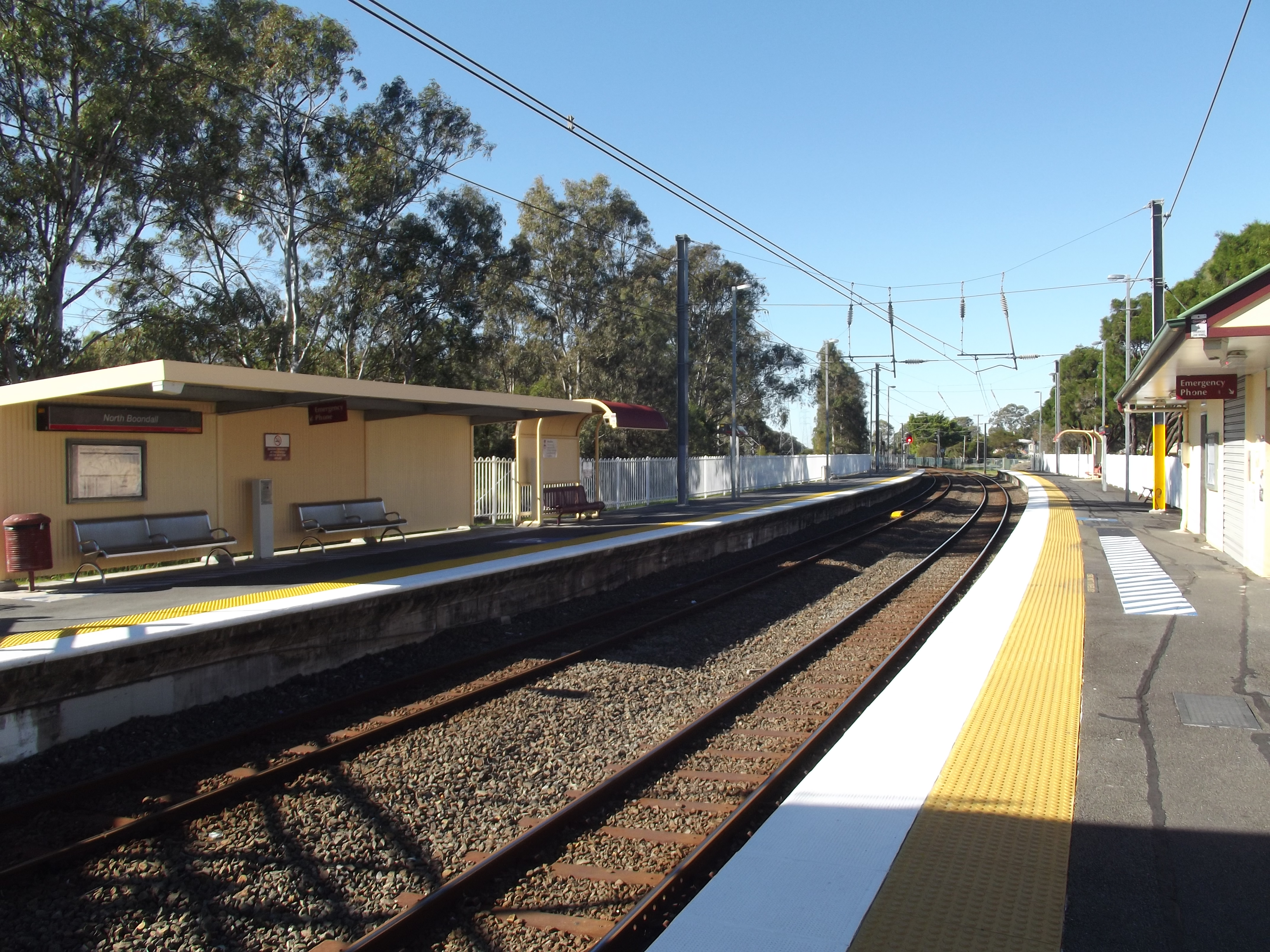
- Southbound view from Platform 1 in July 2012

General information
- Location: Aberdeen Parade, Boondall
- Coordinates: 27°20′19″S 153°03′39″E
- Owner: Queensland Rail
- Operator: Queensland Rail
- Line: T4 Shorncliffe
- Distance: 17.16 kilometres from Central
- Platforms: 2 (2 side)
- Tracks: 2

Construction
- Structure type: Ground
- Parking: 177 bays
- Cycle facilities: Yes
- Accessible: Assisted

Other information
- Status: Staffed part time
- Station code: 600419 (platform 1); 600420 (platform 2)
- Fare zone: Zone 2
- Website: Queensland Rail

History
- Opened: 1882
- Former names: Cabbage Tree Creek (1882–1911); Nudgee College (1911–1923); Boondall (1923–1986)

Services
Preceding station	Queensland Rail	Following station
Boondall towards Cleveland via Roma Street	T4 Shorncliffe line	Deagon towards Shorncliffe
Location

North Boondall is a railway station operated by Queensland Rail on the Shorncliffe line. It opened in 1882 and serves the Brisbane suburb of Boondall. It is a ground level station, featuring two side platforms.

== History ==
North Boondall station opened in 1882 as Cabbage Tree Creek, it was later renamed Nudgee College, then changed to Boondall in 1923. The station was renamed North Boondall upon opening of the Brisbane Entertainment Centre in 1986

== Services ==
North Boondall station is served by all stops Shorncliffe line services from Shorncliffe to Roma Street, Cannon Hill, Manly and Cleveland

== Platforms and services ==
North Boondall platform arrangement
Platform	Line	Destination	Notes
1	T4 Shorncliffe	Roma Street (to Cleveland line)	
2	T4 Shorncliffe	Shorncliffe	
