= Hemmant railway station =

Railway station in Queensland, Australia

Hemmant
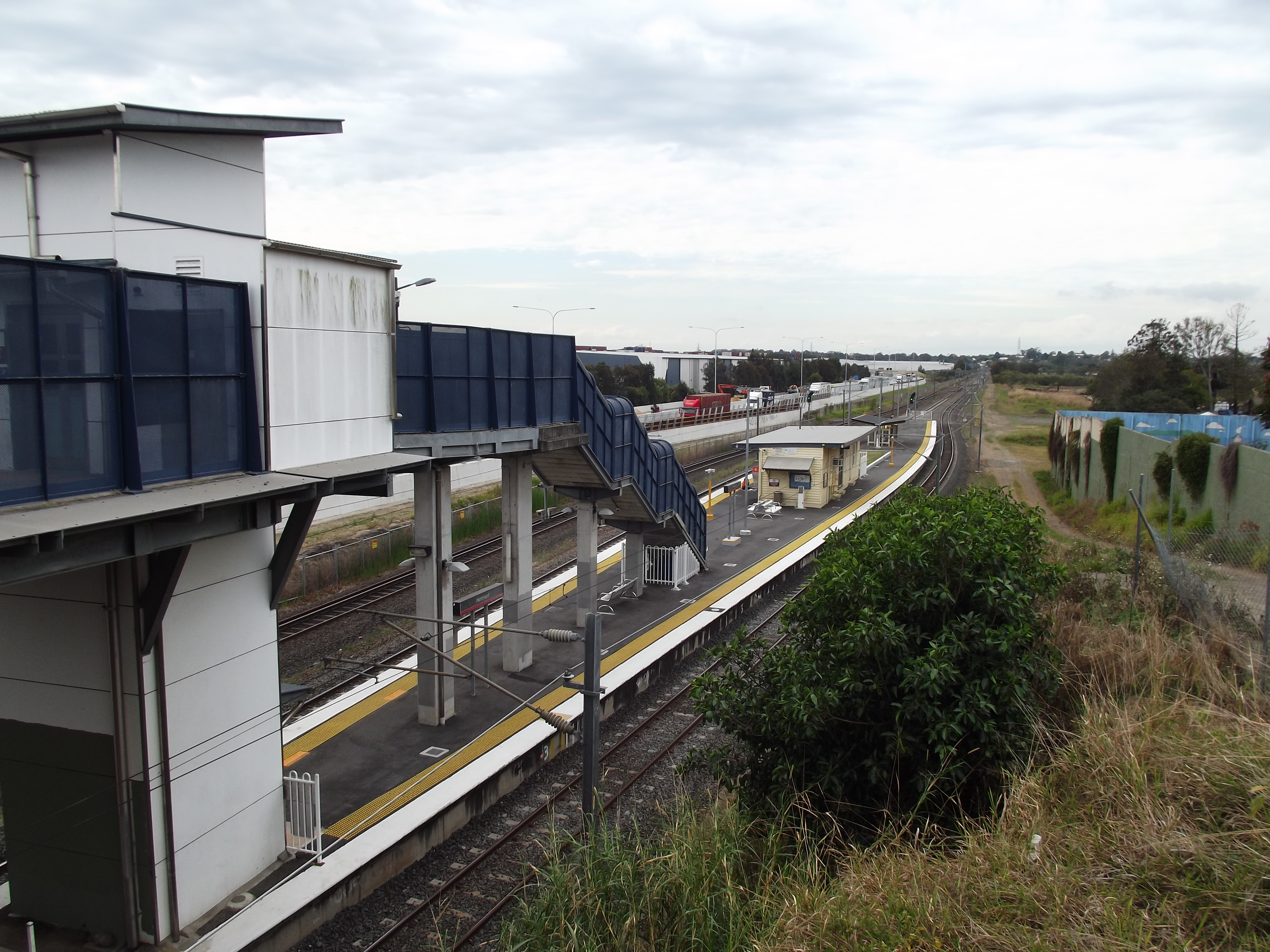
- Eastbound view of Platform 2, August 2012

General information
- Location: Hemmant and Tingalpa Road, Hemmant
- Coordinates: 27°26′50″S 153°07′38″E
- Owner: Queensland Rail
- Operator: Queensland Rail
- Line: Cleveland
- Distance: 17.44 kilometres from Central
- Platforms: 2 (1 island)
- Tracks: 3

Construction
- Structure type: Ground
- Accessible: Yes

Other information
- Station code: 600260 (platform 1); 600261 (platform 2)
- Fare zone: Zone 2
- Website: Translink

History
- Opened: 1914

Services
Preceding station	Queensland Rail	Following station
Murarrie towards Shorncliffe via Roma Street	Cleveland line	Lindum towards Cleveland
Location

Hemmant is a railway station operated by Queensland Rail on the Cleveland line. It opened in 1914 and serves the Brisbane suburb of Hemmant. It is a ground level station, featuring one island platform with two faces.

== Services ==
Hemmant is served by Cleveland line services from Shorncliffe, Northgate, Doomben and Bowen Hills to Manly and Cleveland. Hemmant is 31 minutes from Cleveland and 32 minutes from Central.

== Platforms and services ==
Hemmant platform arrangement
Platform	Line	Destination	Notes
1	Cleveland	Roma Street (to Shorncliffe line)	
2	Cleveland	Cleveland	
