= Lindum railway station =

Railway station in Queensland, Australia

Lindum
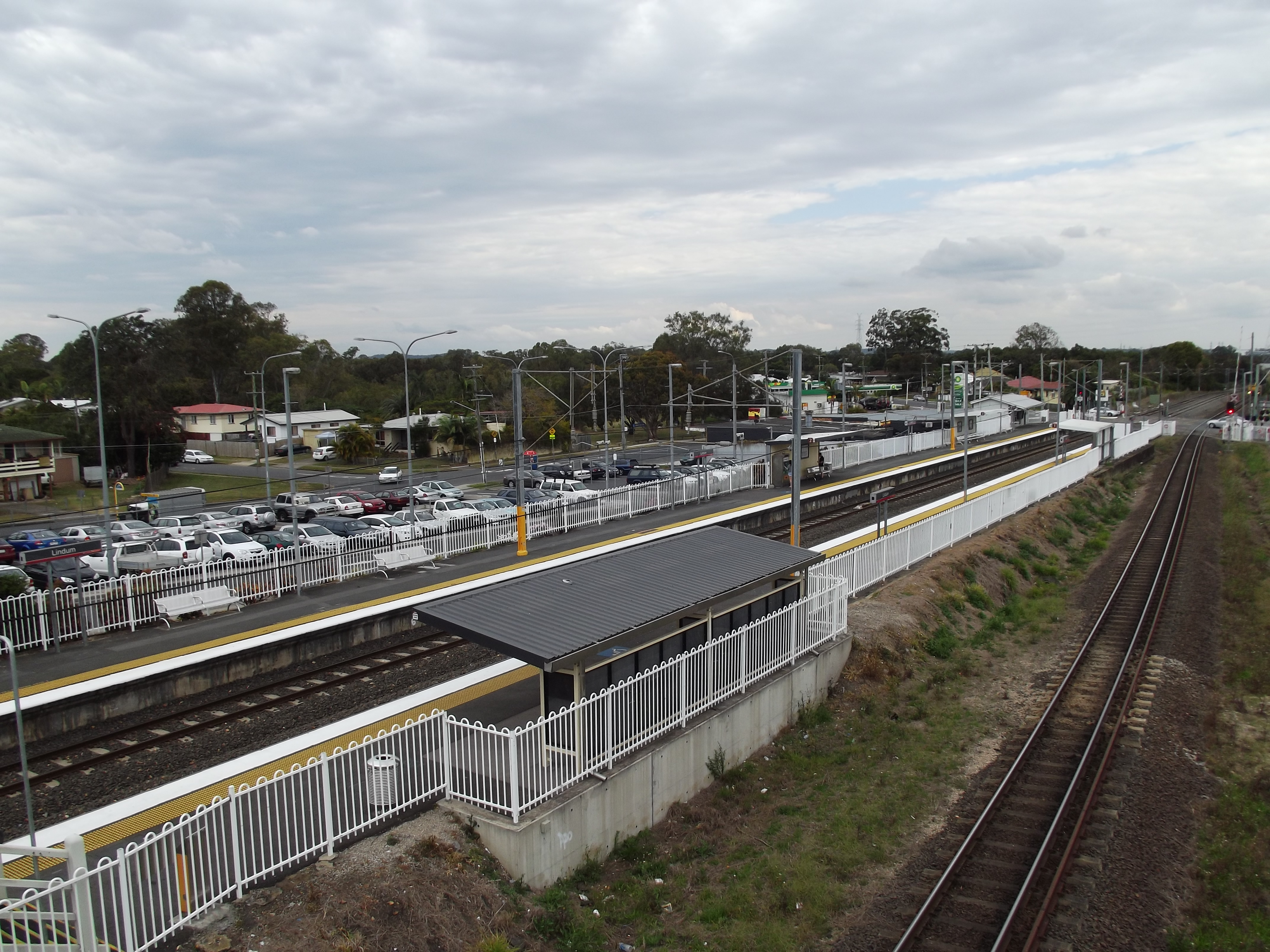
- Westbound view of the station platforms, August 2012

General information
- Location: Sibley’s Road, Wynnum West
- Coordinates: 27°26′31″S 153°08′42″E
- Owner: Queensland Rail
- Operator: Queensland Rail
- Line: Cleveland
- Distance: 19.19 kilometres from Central
- Platforms: 2 side
- Tracks: 3

Construction
- Structure type: Ground
- Parking: 113 bays
- Cycle facilities: Yes
- Accessible: Assisted

Other information
- Station code: 600263 (platform 1); 600262 (platform 2)
- Fare zone: Zone 2
- Website: Queensland Rail

History
- Rebuilt: 22 December 2024

Services
Preceding station	Queensland Rail	Following station
Hemmant towards Shorncliffe via Roma Street	Cleveland line	Wynnum North towards Cleveland
Location

Lindum is a railway station operated by Queensland Rail on the Cleveland line. It opened in 1889 and serves the Brisbane suburb of Wynnum West. It is a ground level station, featuring two side platforms.

== History ==
From 22 January 2024 to 22 December 2024, Lindum station was temporarily closed for an accessibility upgrade. This upgrade includes additions of lifts, raised platforms, hearing loops and disability compliant ticket windows.

== Incidents ==
In February 2019, an elderly woman died after being struck by a train while crossing the tracks.

Two years later a 32-year-old woman died after her car was struck while on the crossing.

== Services ==
Lindum is served by Cleveland line services from Shorncliffe, Northgate, Doomben and Bowen Hills to Manly and Cleveland.

== Platforms and services ==
Lindum platform arrangement
Platform	Line	Destination	Notes
1	Cleveland	Cleveland	
2	Cleveland	Roma Street (to Shorncliffe line)	

== Transport links ==
Transport for Brisbane operate two bus routes to and from Lindum station:

- 223: Wynnum/Manly clockwise loop
- 224: Wynnum/Manly anti-clockwise loop
- 229: Wynnum North railbus loop
