= Fisherman Islands railway line =

Overview
- Termini: Dutton Park; Fisherman Islands
- Continues from: Gold Coast line NSW North Coast line

Service
- Operator(s): Aurizon; Pacific National

History
- Opened: 1980

Technical
- Line length: 24 km (15 mi)
- Track gauge: Dual gauge 1,067 mm (3 ft 6 in); 1,435 mm (4 ft 8 1/2 in) standard gauge

The Fisherman Islands railway line is an Australian dual gauge freight only line to the Port of Brisbane.

== History ==
In 1980, Queensland Rail built a freight-only line between Cannon Hill and Fisherman Islands. It paralleled the existing Cleveland line from Cannon Hill to Lytton Junction, east of Lindum, before continuing to Fisherman Islands on its own alignment.

In 1992, the Queensland Government announced that construction would commence on an 11 kilometre dual gauge rail link from Dutton Park to Cannon Hill, with the existing line from Cannon Hill to Fisherman Islands to be converted to dual gauge. This would connect the Port of Brisbane to the NSW North Coast line and the standard gauge network. Prior to its construction, freight between the Port of Brisbane and New South Wales had to be either transhipped or wagons bogie exchanged at Acacia Ridge. This was funded under the Federal Government's One Nation Program.

Construction commenced in September 1993. To avoid congestion, a grade separated junction was built at Dutton Park, where the new line branched off from the NSW North Coast line to allow the line to operate without interfering with Beenleigh and Cleveland line services.

On 15 July 1996, the line opened from Dutton Park to Murarrie. Narrow gauge workings commenced to Fisherman Islands in November 1996 with the first standard gauge train operating on 28 March 1997.
