= Murarrie railway station =

Railway station in Queensland, Australia

Murarrie
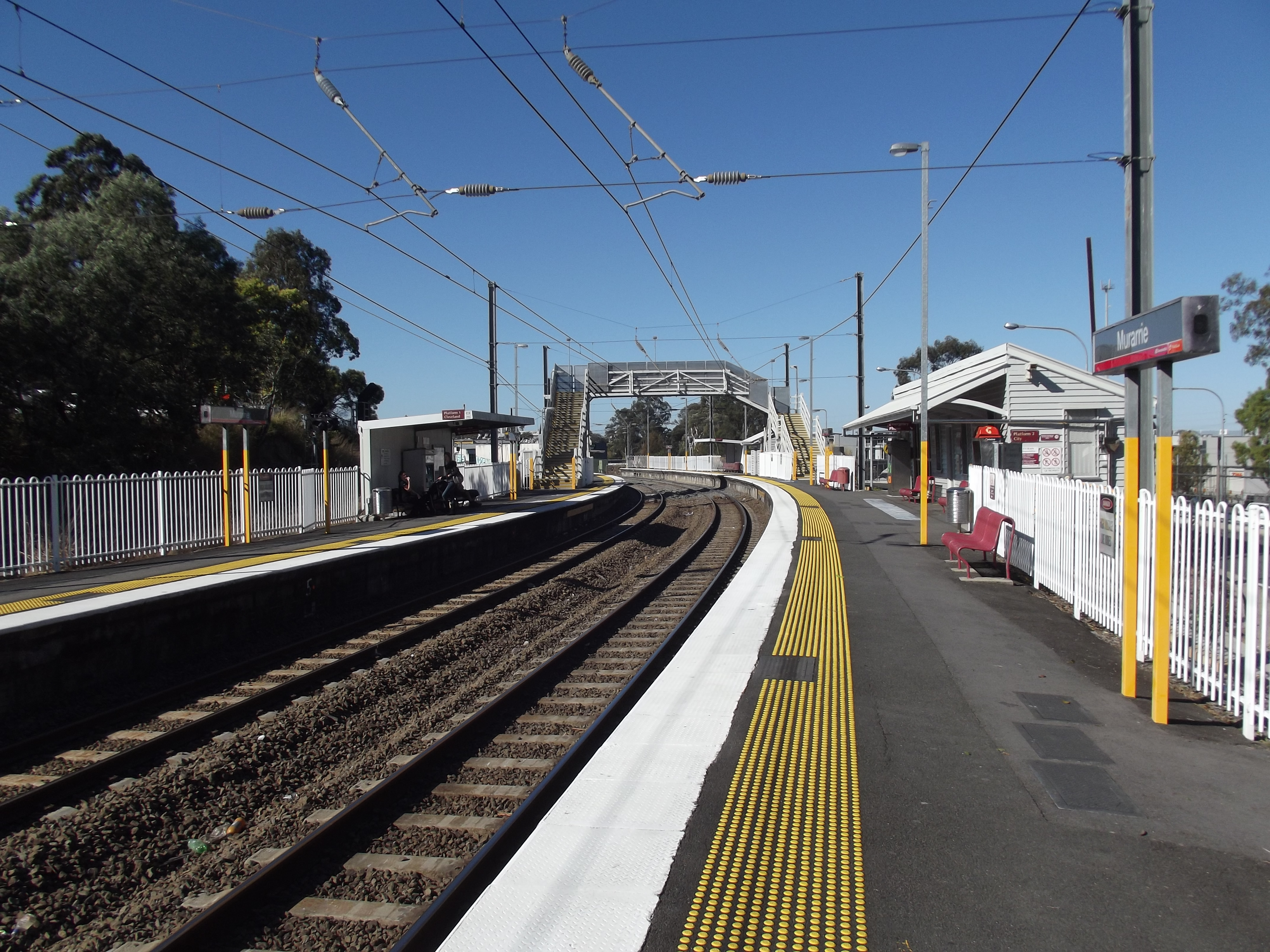
- Westbound view from Platform 2, August 2012

General information
- Location: Murarrie Road, Murarrie
- Coordinates: 27°27′53″S 153°06′21″E
- Owner: Queensland Rail
- Operator: Queensland Rail
- Line: T4 Cleveland
- Distance: 14.30 kilometres from Central
- Platforms: 2 side
- Tracks: 3

Construction
- Structure type: Ground
- Parking: 48 bays
- Cycle facilities: Yes
- Accessible: Yes

Other information
- Station code: 600259 (platform 1); 600258 (platform 2)
- Fare zone: Zone 1/2
- Website: Translink

History
- Former names: Mooraree

Services
Preceding station	Queensland Rail	Following station
Cannon Hill towards Shorncliffe	Cleveland line	Hemmant towards Cleveland
Location

Murarrie is a railway station operated by Queensland Rail on the Cleveland line. It opened in 1910 and serves the Brisbane suburb of Murarrie. It is a ground level station, featuring two side platforms.

== Services ==
Murarrie is served by Cleveland line services from Shorncliffe, Northgate, Doomben and Bowen Hills to Manly and Cleveland.

During morning peak hour (6am-8am), Murrarie is served by both express and all stop services. 6 inbound services that stop here are all stop services originating from Manly, while 6 more inbound services have run express between Manly and Murrarie and originated from Cleveland. 6 outbound services continue as all stop services terminating at Manly, while 5 outbound services run express from Murrarie to Manly before continuing to Cleveland.

During afternoon peak hour (5pm-6pm), Murrarie is again served by both express and all stops services. 4 outbound services continue as all stop services terminating at Manly, while 4 more outbound services run express from Murrarie to Manly before continuing to Cleveland. 4 inbound services that also stop here are all stop services originating from Manly, while 4 outbound services have run express from Manly to Murrarie before continuing to Roma Street, typically as T4 Shorncliffe Line services

== Platforms and services ==
Murarrie platform arrangement
Platform	Line	Destination	Notes
1	T4 Cleveland	Cleveland	
2	T4 Cleveland	Roma Street (to Shorncliffe line)	
