= Cleveland Railway =

Cleveland Railway may refer to:

- Cleveland Railway (England), United Kingdom
- Cleveland Railway (Ohio), United States
- Cleveland railway line, Brisbane, Queensland, Australia
- Cleveland railway station, Brisbane, Queensland, Australia
