= Cannon Hill, Queensland =

Cannon Hill
- Suburb
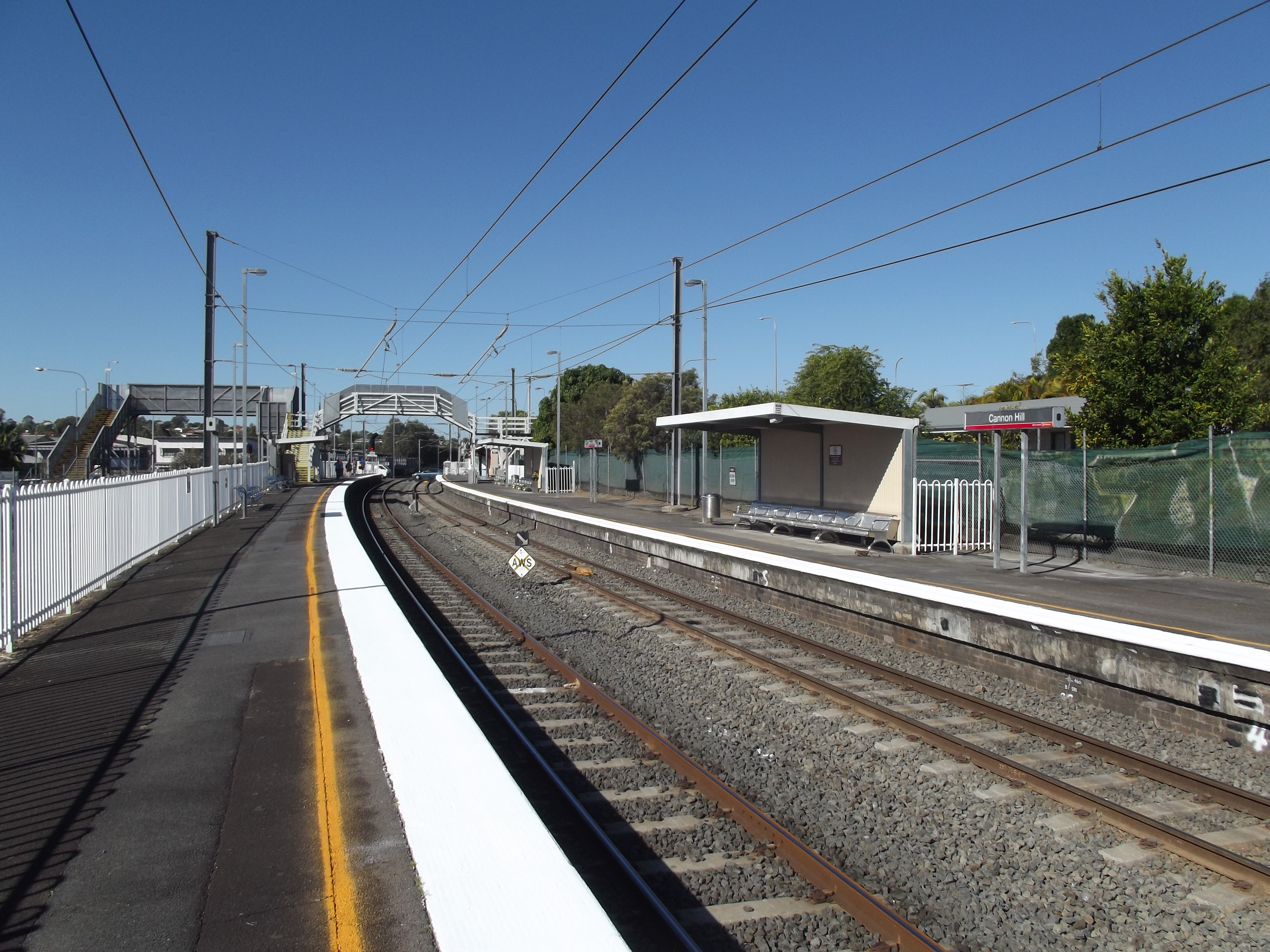
- Cannon Hill railway station

- Interactive map of Cannon Hill
- Coordinates: 27.4734°S 153.0968°E
- Country: Australia
- State: Queensland
- City: Brisbane
- LGA: City of Brisbane (Doboy Ward; Morningside Ward)
- Location: 10.4 km (6.5 mi) E of Brisbane CBD
- Established: 1867

Government
  - State electorate: Bulimba
  - Federal division: Griffith

Area
  - Total: 3.8 km^{2} (1.5 sq mi)

Population
  - Total: 6,701 (2021 census)
  - Density: 1,763/km^{2} (4,570/sq mi)
- Time zone: UTC+10:00 (AEST)
- Postcode: 4170
Suburbs around Cannon Hill
Morningside	Murarrie	Murarrie
Morningside	Cannon Hill	Tingalpa
Seven Hills	Carina	Carina

Cannon Hill is a suburb in the City of Brisbane, Queensland, Australia. In the 2021 census, Cannon Hill had a population of 6,701 people.

== Geography ==
The suburb is located 10.4 kilometres (6.5 mi) by road east of the Brisbane CBD.

== History ==
Cannon Hill was originally inhabited by Aboriginal people but, after being accused of "intimidating" the settlers, they were "dispersed" by the Native Police and Brisbane Mounted Police in November 1861, around the time when British settlement began in the area. Some land was used by settlers for farming and grazing, but the area remained mostly bushland.

The suburb is most likely named after Cannon Hill House, a residence formerly located on Wynnum Road. It was occupied by the Weedon family from its construction in 1867 until burning down in 1926. Thornhill Weedon named the house after two fallen trees which were said to have resembled a cannon.

The Cleveland railway line was opened in 1889 going through Cannon Hill to Cleveland. At the same time blocks of land near the station were offered for sale.

Cannon Hill State School opened on 16 August 1915.

In February 1917, the Cannon Hill Progress Association proposed that a School of Arts be established in the district and a campaign of fund raising commenced. In June 1917 a land parcel of 32 perches (810 m^{2}) was reserved for the School of Arts. In August 1922 it was announced that construction of the building was underway, although the stumps (the foundations of a Queenslander building) were not in place until February 1923. The building was to be 70 by 40 feet (21 by 12 m) and to be used as a dancing and concert hall, gymnasium and reading and recreation room purposes. Although intended to be two storeys, by June 1923 it was decided to just construct one storey initially to avoid going into debt. A stump-capping ceremony was held on 9 June 1923. The School of Arts was completed in 1923, consisting of a large hall and a library.

On Sunday 14 June 1925, Archbishop James Duhig blessed and laid the foundation stone of the new Catholic presbytery. He also blessed and opened St Finbar's Convent to be occupied by the Sisters of Charity. He returned in August 1925 to officially open the presbytery.

Cannon Hill Presbyterian Church opened in 1930 with the financial assistance of William Robert Black. It was a timber building designed by Brisbane architect George Trotter. The stump-capping ceremony was held on 22 March 1930 and the church was officially opened on 17 May 1930. The church property was sold in 2002 for $220,000 and has been converted into a private home.

In 1931, Brisbane's sale yards for livestock were relocated from Newmarket to Cannon Hill adjacent to the abattoir. The sale yards at Cannon Hill were described as "a paradise as compared to the old yards at Newmarket" and "possibly the best in the Southern Hemisphere". Specifically the yards had been specially constructed to prevent the bruising of cattle and the meat could be produced more hygienically for both local consumption and export.

Blessed Oliver Plunkett School opened in January 1947 with an initial enrolment of 90 students. It was operated by the Presentation Sisters, a Roman Catholic order of nuns. When Oliver Plunkett was canonised on 12 October 1975 by Pope Paul VI, the school was renamed Saint Oliver Plunkett School. In December 1986 the involvement of the Presentation Sisters in the school ceased and a lay principal was appointed.

St Boniface's Anglican Church Room was opened circa 1952. It closed circa 1964.

Cannon Hill Kmart Plaza opened in 1973. Kmart is still situated in the original building. The eastern wing housing a Woolworths supermarket is a newer addition. The shopping mart behind the Cannon Hill Shopping Centre, including anchor tenants Aldi and Bunnings, was previously the site of a drive-in cinema.

In 1994, a Cannon Hill paddock became one of the first places where Hendra virus was transmitted between bats and horses. The infected mare was taken to a training complex, starting an outbreak that eventually killed horse trainer Vic Rail (horse trainer). The paddock has since been turned into housing and parkland in Murarrie.

== Demographics ==
In the 2016 census, Cannon Hill had a population of 5,533 people. The median age of the population was 34; 4 years younger than the Australian average. 68.8% of people were born in Australia. The next most common countries of birth were New Zealand 3.9% and England 3.3%. 78.9% of people spoke only English at home. Other languages spoken at home included Mandarin at 2.2%. The most common responses for religion were No Religion 32.6%, Catholic 27.2% and Anglican 11.6%.

In the 2021 census, Cannon Hill had a population of 6,701 people.

== Heritage listings ==
Cannon Hill has a number of heritage-listed sites, including:

- 66 Barrack Road: Cannon Hill railway station
- 29 Beauvardia Street: St Oliver Plunkett Catholic Church
- 4 Molloy Road: former Cannon Hill Presbyterian Church
- 58 Moncrief Road: Housing Commission Duplex
- 845–849 Wynnum Road: Cannon Hill State School
- 958 Wynnum Road: Cannon Hill School of Arts

== Education ==
Cannon Hill State School is a government primary (Prep–6) school for boys and girls at 845 Wynnum Road (27.4681°S 153.0838°E). In 2017, the school had an enrolment of 264 students with 23 teachers (19 full-time equivalent) and 18 non-teaching staff (9 full-time equivalent).

St Oliver Plunkett School is a Catholic primary (Prep–6) school for boys and girls at 17 Beauvardia Street (27.4697°S 153.0843°E). In 2017, the school had an enrolment of 505 students with 34 teachers (31 full-time equivalent) and 20 non-teaching staff (12 full-time equivalent).

Cannon Hill Anglican College is a private primary and secondary (Prep–12) school for boys and girls at the corner of Junction and Krupp Roads (27.4603°S 153.0840°E). In 2017, the school had an enrolment of 1,181 students with 99 teachers (90 full-time equivalent) and 57 non-teaching staff (43 full-time equivalent).

There is no government secondary school in Cannon Hill. The nearest government secondary schools are Balmoral State High School in Balmoral to the north-west and Whites Hill State College in neighbouring Carina to the south.

== Facilities ==
Cannon Hill Police Beat Shopfront is at Shop 15, Cannon Hill Kmart Plaza, 1909 Creek Road (27.4709°S 153.0980°E).

Cannon Hill Fire Station is at 24 Corporate Drive (27.4674°S 153.0906°E).

== Amenities ==
Cannon Hill Kmart Plaza is a shopping centre on the south-east corner of Creek Road and Wynnum Road (27.4719°S 153.0975°E). It is anchored by a Kmart and a Coles supermarket.

Cannon Central Shopping Centre is at 1145 Wynnum Road (27.4715°S 153.0998°E). It is anchored by a Woolworths supermarket.

Urban Village Shopping Centre is at 965 Wynnum Road (27.4689°S 153.0901°E). Most of the shops in the centre are for casual dining.

Cannon Hill School of Arts is at 958 Wynnum Road (27.4681°S 153.0897°E). It is managed by private trustees and provides a venue for community groups to meet.

== Transport ==
Cannon Hill is well serviced by public transport and is located in zones 2 and 3 of the Translink integrated public transport system. Cannon Hill is also serviced by two major roads which allow for easy transportation around the city.

Cannon Hill railway station provides access to regular Queensland Rail City network services to the Brisbane CBD and Cleveland.

The Cannon Hill bus station is a major interchange for the area. Bus routes include to the Brisbane CBD, Chermside, DFO and Carindale.

State Route 20 (Creek Road): Connects Cannon Hill to Mount Gravatt and Murarrie
State Route 23 (Wynnum Road, Lytton Road, Shafston Road): Connects Cannon Hill to Kangaroo Point and Tingalpa
