= Port of Brisbane =

- Suburb
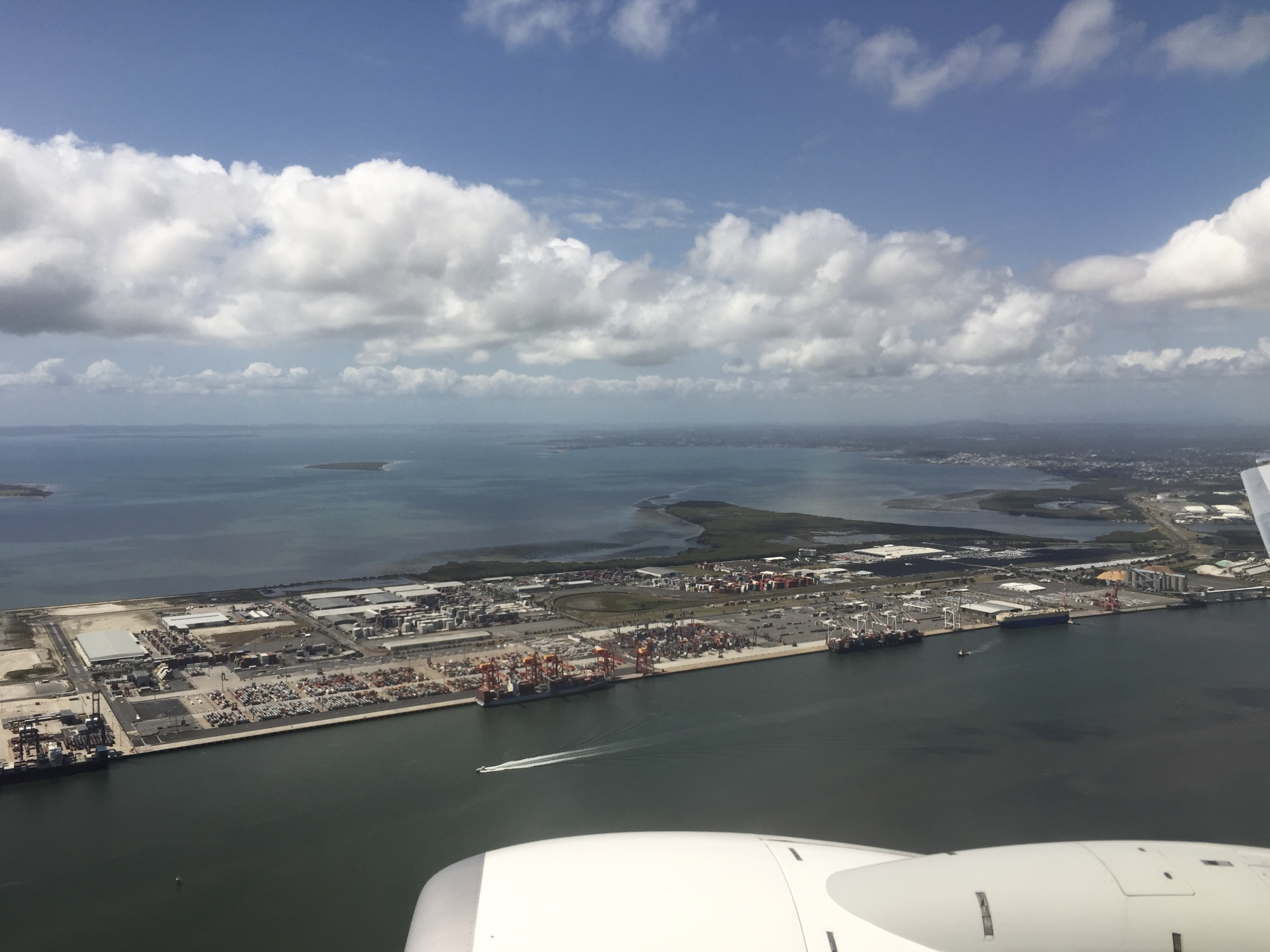
- Moreton Bay and Port of Brisbane, 2016

- Interactive map of Port of Brisbane
- Coordinates: 27.3802°S 153.1802°E
- Country: Australia
- State: Queensland
- City: Brisbane
- LGA: City of Brisbane (Wynnum Manly Ward)
- Location: 23.7 km (14.7 mi) NE of Brisbane CBD

Government
  - State electorate: Lytton
  - Federal division: Bonner

Area
  - Total: 24.6 km^{2} (9.5 sq mi)

Population
  - Total: 0 (2021 census)
  - Density: 0.000/km^{2} (0.00/sq mi)
- Time zone: UTC+10:00 (AEST)
- Postcode: 4178
Suburbs around Port of Brisbane
Bramble Bay	Moreton Bay	Moreton Bay
Pinkenba	Port of Brisbane	Moreton Bay
Pinkenba	Lytton	Moreton Bay

Port of Brisbane is the main shipping port and a coastal suburb of the City of Brisbane, on the east coast of Queensland, Australia.

== Geography ==
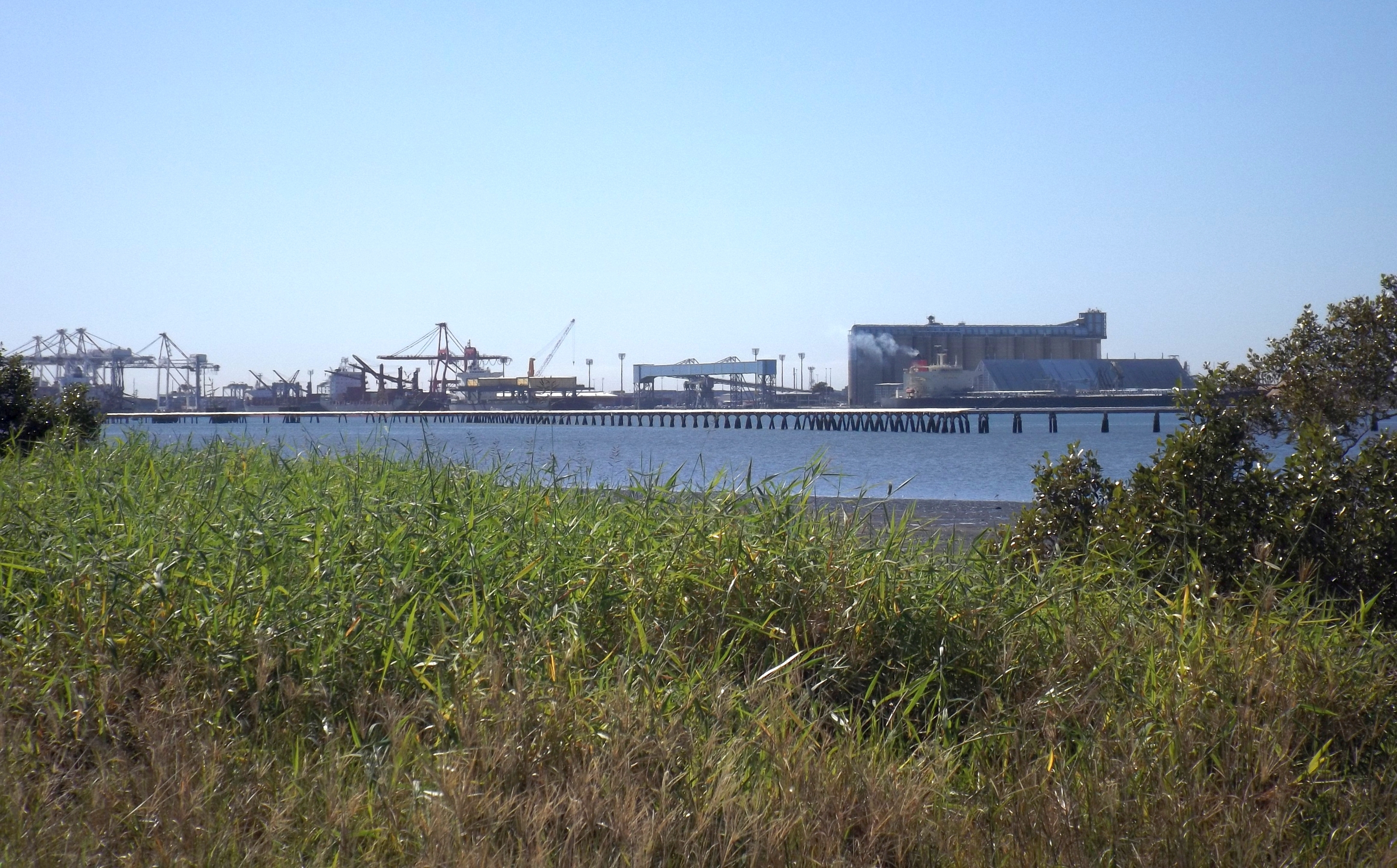
View from Pinkenba, 2015

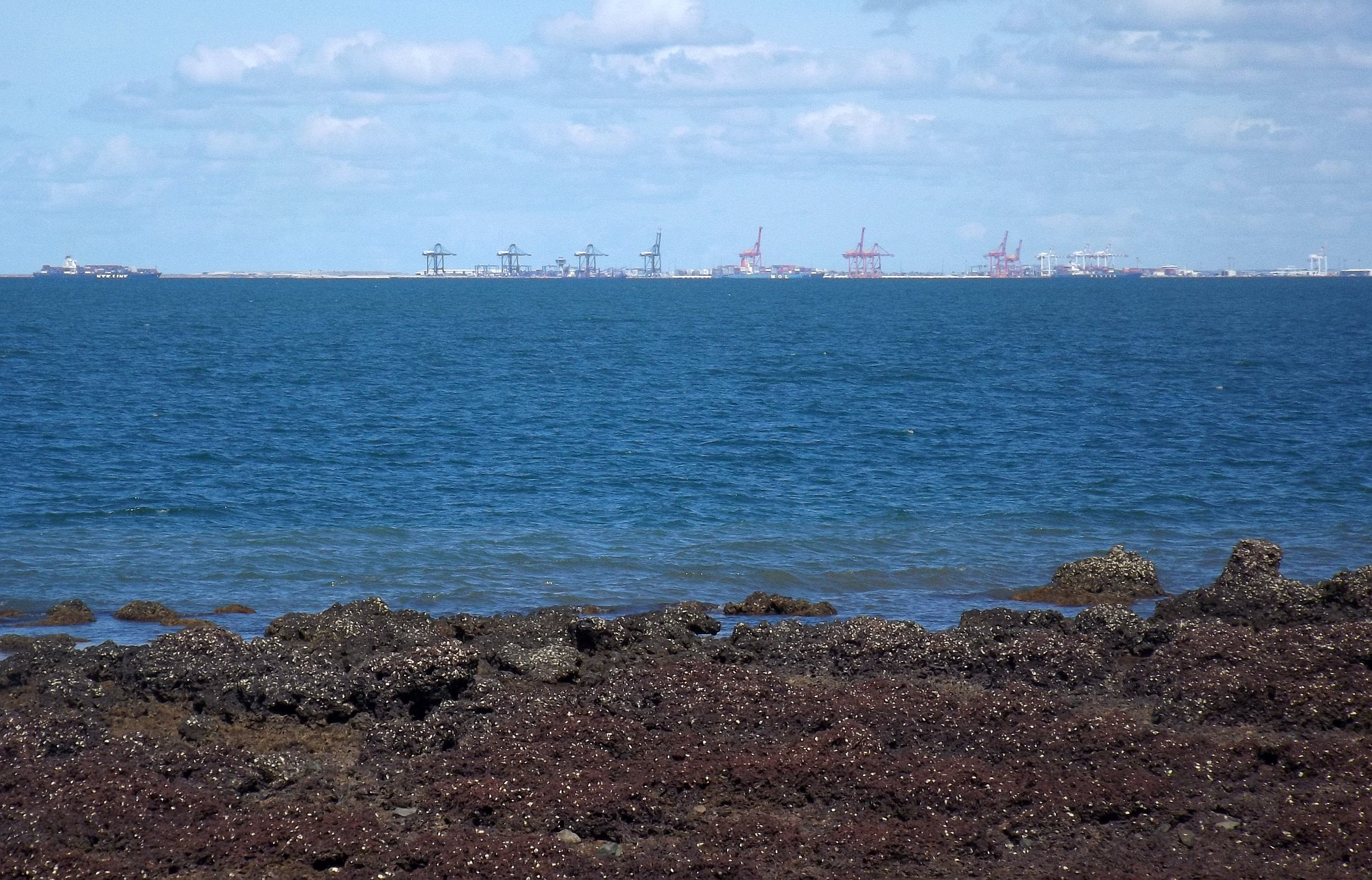
View from Redcliffe, 2016

The Port of Brisbane is located in the lower reaches of the Brisbane River on Fisherman Island, an artificial island reclaimed from the smaller Fisherman Islands group at the mouth of the river, adjacent to Brisbane Airport. It is currently the third-busiest port in Australia and the nation's fastest-growing container port. It is the endpoint of the main shipping channel across Moreton Bay, which extends 90 kilometres (56 mi) north to Mooloolaba, and is dredged to maintain a depth of 14 metres (46 ft) at the lowest tide.

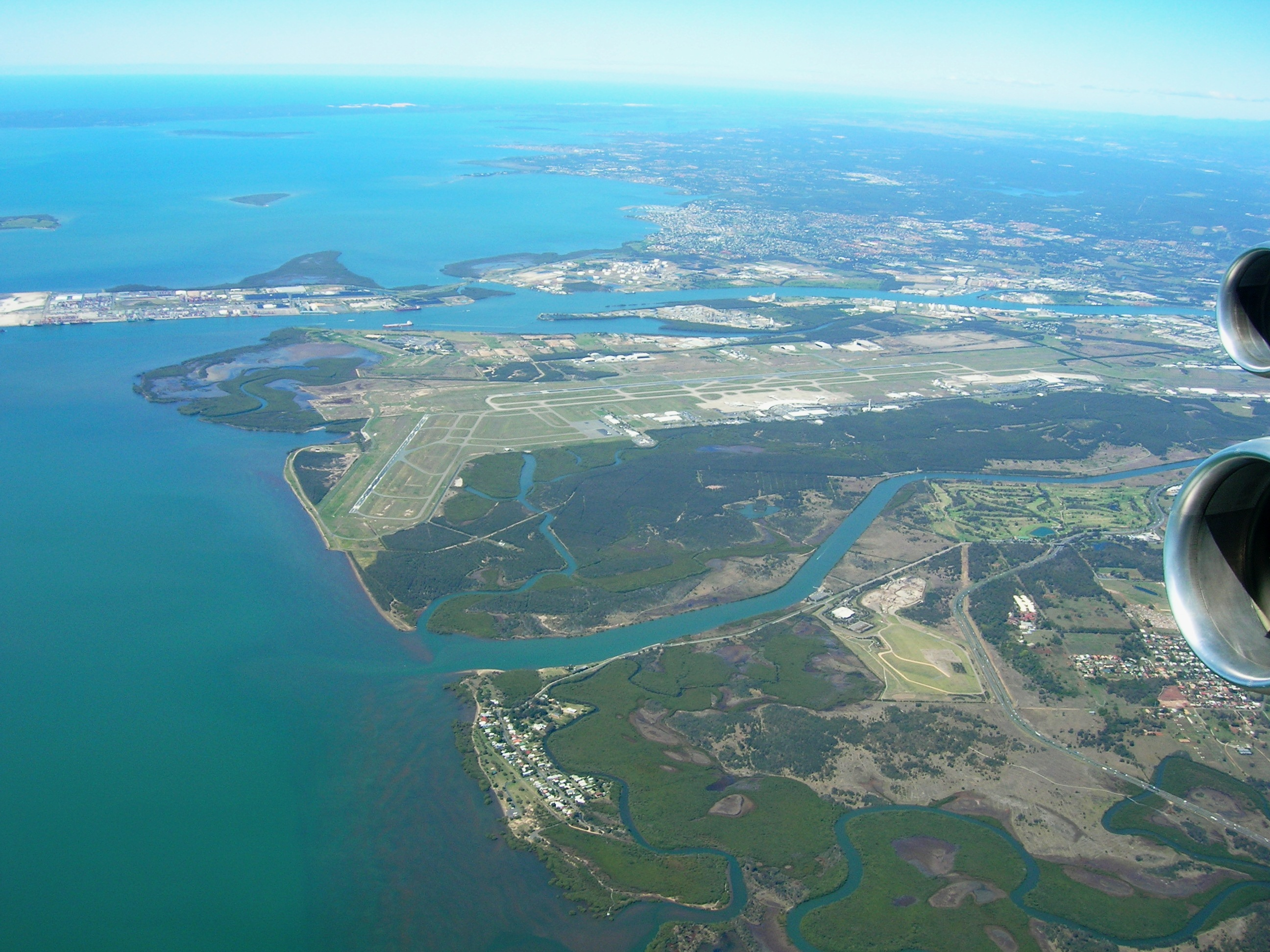
Brisbane airport and Port of Brisbane

Queensland's next two largest ports are the Port of Gladstone and the Port of Townsville.

According to the former Queensland Department of Primary Industries, the Port of Brisbane was the most likely entry point of the South American fire ant to Australia.

About 60% of the coal transported through the port originates from the New Acland Mine.

== History ==
In 1980, the narrow gauge (1,067 mm / 3 ft 6 in) Fisherman Islands line was opened between the port and a junction near Lindum on the Cleveland line. This was converted to dual 1,435 mm (4 ft 8 1/2 in) / 1,067 mm (3 ft 6 in) gauge in 1997 under the Keating Government's One Nation program.

In January 2008, Port of Brisbane Corporation signed an agreement with Brisbane Container Terminals, a wholly owned subsidiary of Hutchison Port Holdings, subsidiary of Hutchison Whampoa, which Hutchison will operate berths 11 and 12 for 42 years.

Deposits of silt and sediment in the ports channels and berths have caused delays of up to five days in the delivery of cargo including oil supplies. This has occurred in 2011, 2013 and 2014. Millions of dollars is spent on dredging annually.

== Demographics ==
In the 2016 census and 2021 census, Port of Brisbane had "no people or a very low population".

== Facilities ==
The port is managed by the Port of Brisbane Pty Ltd (PBPL) under a 99-year lease from the Queensland Government. The Port of Brisbane has 29 operating berths including nine deep-water container berths and three deep-water bulk berths as well as 17 bulk and general cargo berths. In total the port facilitates more than 2,600 ships each year and transports more than 28 million tonnes of cargo each year.

Portside Wharf at Hamilton was completed in 2006 and is an international standard facility for cruise liners, offering restaurants, coffee shops, gift shops, and other facilities. However, due to the height restrictions of the Gateway Bridge and length restriction of 270 metres (890 ft) that far upstream, the larger ocean-going cruise liners must dock further down the river at the more industrial Multi User Terminal at the Port of Brisbane. On 2 June 2022, the Brisbane International Cruise Terminal opened on the northern bank of the Brisbane River in the suburb of Pinkenba opposite the port. The cruise terminal is located at Luggage Point next to the Luggage Point Sewage Treatment Plant (which has been renamed the Luggage Point Resource Recovery Centre). The terminal can accommodate the largest cruise vessels in the world. It is operated by the port but will not be part of the suburb of Port of Brisbane.

The port accommodates a visitors centre and in 2005 a shorebird roost was constructed. The bird roost is the largest site built specifically for migratory shorebirds on the east coast of Australia.

== Transport links ==
The Port of Brisbane Motorway is a short road linking the Gateway Motorway to the Port of Brisbane. Nearly all freight arrives at the port via heavy trucks with just 2% arriving by rail in 2019.

== Expansion ==
Berth	Year opened	Length	Usage	Occupier
9	-	317	containers	Patrick Corporation
10	2009	372	containers	Patrick Corporation
11	2012	350	containers	Hutchinson Ports Australia
12	2014	310	containers	Hutchinson Ports Australia

== See also ==
- Australia TradeCoast
- Transport in Brisbane
