= Murarrie =

- Suburb
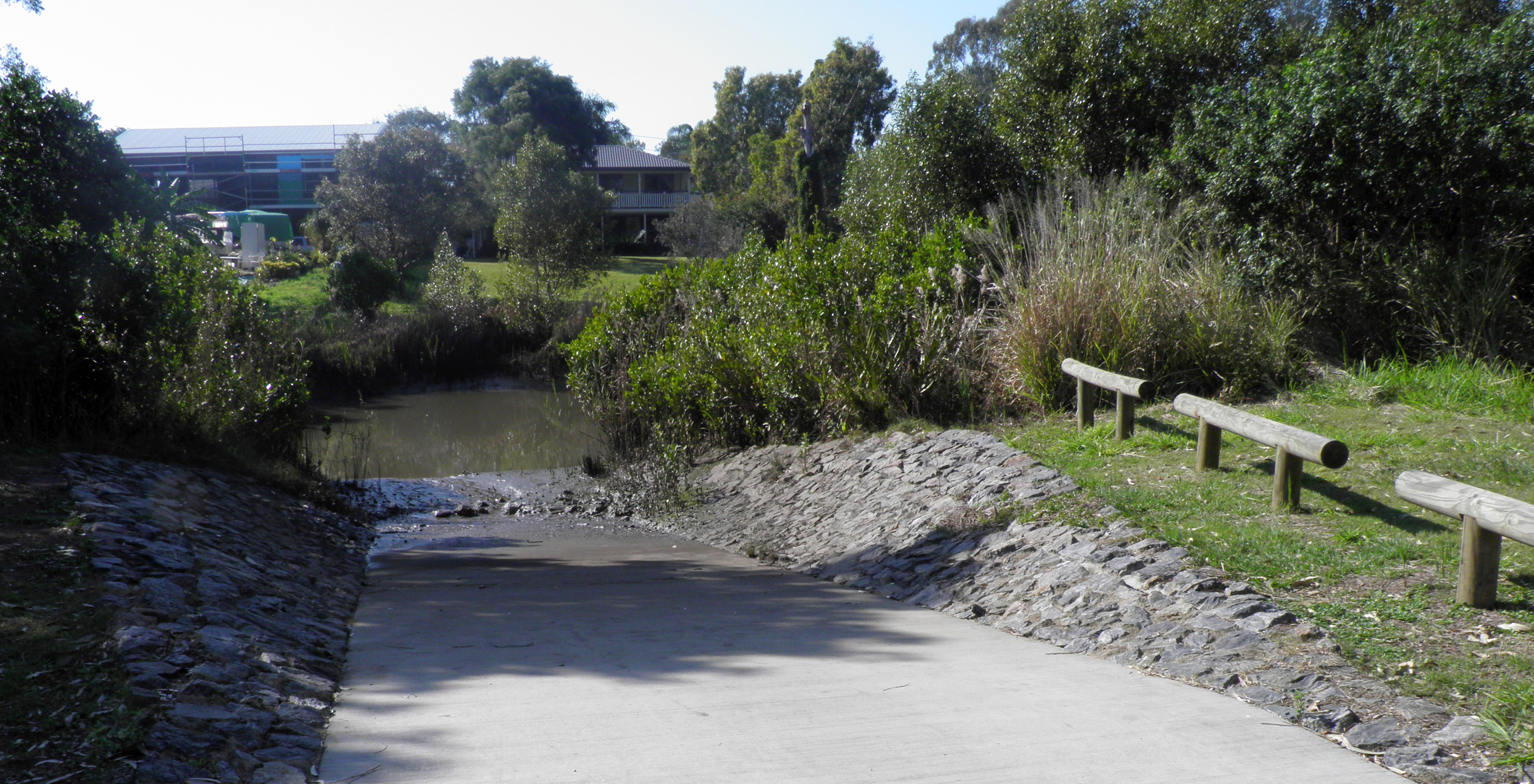
- Canoe ramp at Murarrie Recreation Reserve

- Interactive map of Murarrie
- Coordinates: 27.4525°S 153.1052°E
- Country: Australia
- State: Queensland
- City: Brisbane
- LGA: City of Brisbane (Doboy Ward)
- Location: 11.9 km (7.4 mi) E of Brisbane CBD

Government
  - State electorate: Bulimba
  - Federal divisions: Bonner; Griffith

Area
  - Total: 9.4 km^{2} (3.6 sq mi)

Population
  - Total: 4,946 (2021 census)
  - Density: 526.2/km^{2} (1,363/sq mi)
- Time zone: UTC+10:00 (AEST)
- Postcode: 4172
Suburbs around Murarrie
Hamilton; Eagle Farm	Pinkenba	Hemmant
Morningside	Murarrie	Hemmant
Cannon Hill	Cannon Hill	Tingalpa

Murarrie (formerly Mooraree) is an eastern riverside mixed-use suburb in the City of Brisbane, Queensland, Australia. Queensport is a neighbourhood within Murarrie (27.4500°S 153.1000°E). Gibson Island is a neighbourhood within Murarrie (27.4364°S 153.1224°E) and, despite its name, is no longer an island. In the 2021 census, Murarrie had a population of 4,946 people.

== Geography ==
Murarrie is located in the eastern suburbs on the southern bank of the Brisbane River. It is bounded to the north by the median of the Brisbane River, to the east and south by the river's tributary Bulimba Creek (historically known as Doughboy Creek or Doboy Creek) which has its mouth at 27.4291°S 153.1293°E. It is then bounded to the south-west and west by Wynnum Road, Creek Road, the Cleveland railway line, Barrack Road, Lytton Road, Colmslie Road (formerly Chemical Works Road) and then north to the river.

The Gateway Motorway passes through the suburb, entering from the south-east (Tingalpa) and exiting via the Sir Leo Hielscher Bridges (previously known as the Gateway Bridge) over the river to Eagle Farm.

Murarrie railway station (27.4647°S 153.1053°E) is located on the Cleveland railway line of the Queensland Rail City network. The disused Doboy railway station (also known as Buruda railway station and Birt's siding) is on the line at (27.4533°S 153.1150°E); no buildings remain at the site.

The land use is mixed being predominantly industrial but with an area of suburban housing in the south-west or the suburb.

== History ==
The district was originally known as Mooraree after Mooraree House, a home built by Christopher Porter in 1861. The name is thought to be mudherri, a word from the Yuggera language (Yugarabul dialect) meaning sticky or muddy. The name of the locality and the railway station were changed to Murarrie in 1907.

It is uncertain when the Queensport Hotel (now Queensport Tavern) was established; the hotel claims it was 1864, making it one of Brisbane's oldest continuously operated hotels. The present hotel building at 49 Gosport Road (now in the suburb of Hemmant) (27.4404°S 153.1302°E) was constructed in 1890-1891 for publican Martin Kavanagh by Brisbane architect Charles McLay and was one of his first private commissions. It is listed on the Brisbane Heritage Register. The Lytton Hotel was operating in 1878 and Kavanagh bought the Lytton Hotel in 1879. Kavanagh had been living in the district growing sugarcane since at least 1874. Kavanagh's daughter Bridget continued to operate the Lytton Hotel when her father opened the Queensport Hotel.

The Queensland Freezing and Food Export Company established a meatworks at Queensport in 1881.

In 1889, Queensport Aquarium opened in Hemmant (the present-day location is Aquarium Avenue in Murarrie, 27.447°S 153.102°E). It had a zoo, an aquarium and dance halls and other entertainments. Visitors arrived by riverboats until the 1893 flood during which the animals were rescued but the attractions were damaged closed down. It had closed by the late 1890s, but a dance hall continued to operate until 1901.

In 1900, Gibson Island was used as a burial site for some of the victims of the bubonic plague epidemic due to concerns that the bodies of the dead could infect the living, so there was an initial reluctance to bury the dead in normal cemeteries (cremation not being available in Queensland at that time). The Colmslie Plague Hospital had been rapidly constructed in Morningside to handle plague victims. The dead were transferred by boat to Gibson Island for burial. The bodies were wrapped in sheets soaked in carbolic acid and their coffins were filled with a mix of quicklime and water which has the effect of killing micro-organisms. The authorities carried out the burials quickly and family members could not be present nor visit the graves. The number and location of those graves are now unknown. The policy of burying the dead on Gibson Island was subsequently changed as it was felt to be inhumane.

In order to provide a straighter deeper channel in the lower reaches Brisbane River, it was decided in 1889 to relocate the mouths of creeks and eliminate all of islands by a combination of removal by dredging and incorporation as part of the river bank. In the case of Doughboy Creek (now Bulimba Creek) and Gibson Island, it was decided to relocate the creek mouth then at approximately 27.4440°S 153.1096°E (to the west of Gibson Island) to the eastern end of Gibson Island (its current mouth) by closing the original mouth with a training wall diverting the flow of the creek into the Aquarium Passage (27.4394°S 153.125562°E) which separated Gibson Island from the southern bank of the Brisbane River. The Doughboy training wall was built from 1900 to June 1902 and was 7,040 feet (2,150 m) long. As a result of the training wall, an isthmus (approximately 104 metres (341 ft) wide as at 2020) formed at the original mouth of the creek permanently connecting Gibson Island to Murarrie. Paringa Road now crosses the isthmus to provide access to the industrial facilities that were developed circa 1960s on the former island. A spur railway line (now abandoned) was also developed to the north of Paringa Road to provide these facilities with a link to the Cleveland railway line. The line terminated at 27.4324°S 153.1231°E beside the Brisbane River. Sections of track are still visible along the route as at 2020.

Murarrie State School opened on 2 July 1928.

In 1961, the Murarrie Church of Christ opened at 11 Billungah Street. In 1990, it was sold and is now a church of the Plymouth Brethren.

On 11 August 1975, Queensport and Gibson Island were officially designated as neighbourhoods within Murarrie by the Queensland Place Names Board.

St Clare's Anglican Church was dedicated on 11 August 1985 by Bishop Ralph Wicks. The church building was relocated from Primrose Parade, Wynnum, to 16 Penelope Street in Murarrie (27.4569°S 153.1029°E), where it was originally St Margaret's Anglican Church Hall which operated from 1964 to 1985. The closure of St Clare's was approved on 5 September 2009 by Archbishop Phillip Aspinall. It was subsequently redeveloped as housing.

In 1995, News Corporation established a printing facility at 724 Lytton Road (north-west corner with Metroplex Avenue, 27.4560°S 153.0967°E). Four large printing presses were imported from Germany, capable of printing 80,000 newspapers an hour. It had a staff of 400 people. Brisbane's two newspapers, The Courier-Mail and The Sunday Mail, were printed there until News Corporation moved its printing operations to Yandina in 2022.

== Demographics ==
In the 2011 census, the population of Murarrie was 3,958, 50.2% female and 49.8% male. The median age of the Murarrie population was 34 years of age, three years below the Australian median. 70.5% of people living in Murarrie were born in Australia, compared to the national average of 69.8%; the next most common countries of birth were New Zealand 4.9%, England 3.5%, South Africa 1.2%, Fiji 1.1%, Scotland 1%. 81.9% of people spoke only English at home; the next most common languages were 1% Hindi, 1% Mandarin, 0.9% Cantonese, 0.9% Vietnamese, 0.8% Korean.

In the 2016 census, Murarrie had a population of 4,303 people.

In the 2021 census, Murarrie had a population of 4,946 people.

== Education ==
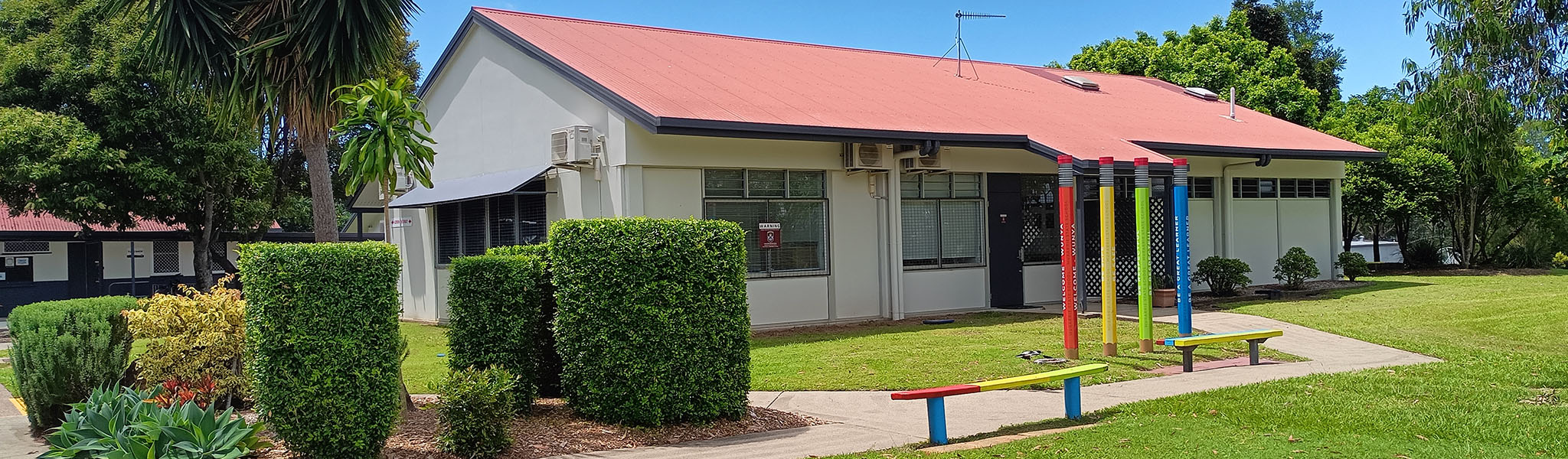
Murarrie State School, 2024

Murarrie State School is a government primary (Prep-6) school for boys and girls at 50 Garrett Street (27.4619°S 153.1009°E). In 2017, the school had an enrolment of 76 students with 8 teachers (5 full-time equivalent) and 9 non-teaching staff (5 full-time equivalent).

There are no secondary schools in Murarrie. The nearest government secondary school is Balmoral State High School in Balmoral.
