= Cannon Hill railway station =

Railway station in Queensland, Australia

Cannon Hill
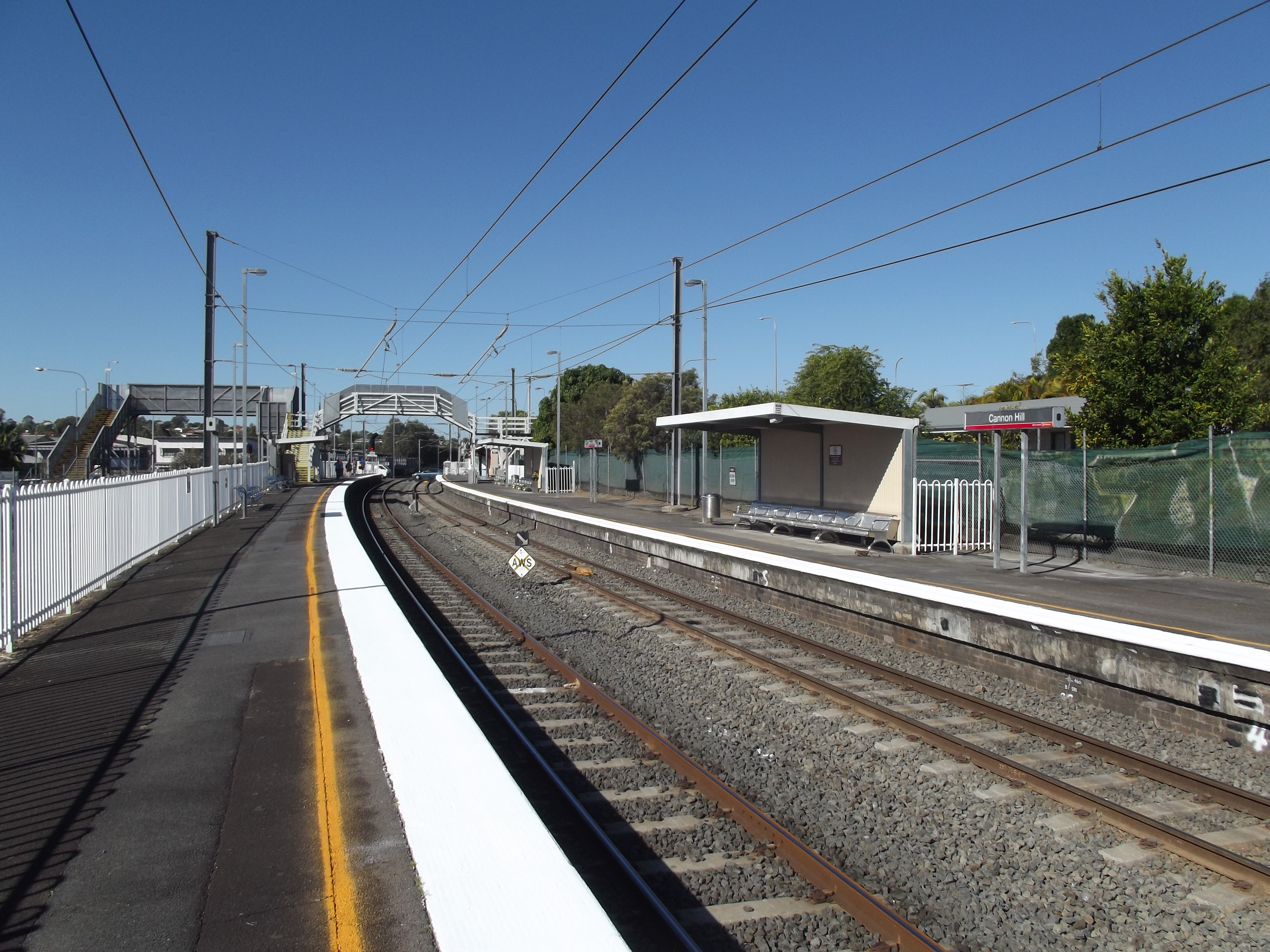
- Eastbound view from Platform 1, August 2012

General information
- Location: Barracks Rd, Cannon Hill
- Coordinates: 27°27′55″S 153°05′21″E
- Owner: Queensland Rail
- Operator: Queensland Rail
- Line: Cleveland
- Distance: 12.61 kilometres from Central
- Platforms: 2 side
- Tracks: 3

Construction
- Structure type: Ground
- Parking: 161 bays
- Cycle facilities: Yes
- Accessible: Yes

Other information
- Station code: 600256 (platform 1); 600257 (platform 2)
- Fare zone: go card 1
- Website: Translink

Services
Preceding station	Queensland Rail	Following station
Morningside towards Shorncliffe via Roma Street	Cleveland line	Murarrie towards Cleveland
Location

Cannon Hill is a railway station operated by Queensland Rail on the Cleveland line. It opened in 1910 and serves the Brisbane suburb of Cannon Hill. It is a ground level station, featuring two side platforms.

== Services ==
Cannon Hill is served by Cleveland line services from Shorncliffe, Northgate, Doomben and Bowen Hills to Manly and Cleveland. Some services terminate at Platform 1: those that are part of a 15-minute service guarantee at peak hours, a system that was introduced in 2014 due to timetable remodeling commissioned by the Queensland State Government and undertaken by R.W. Singleton.

== Platforms and services ==
Cannon Hill platform arrangement
Platform	Line	Destination	Notes
1	Cleveland	Cleveland	
1	Cleveland	Roma Street (to Shorncliffe line)	Weekdays only
2	Cleveland	Roma Street (to Shorncliffe line)	
