= Northgate railway station, Brisbane =

Railway station in Queensland, Australia

Northgate
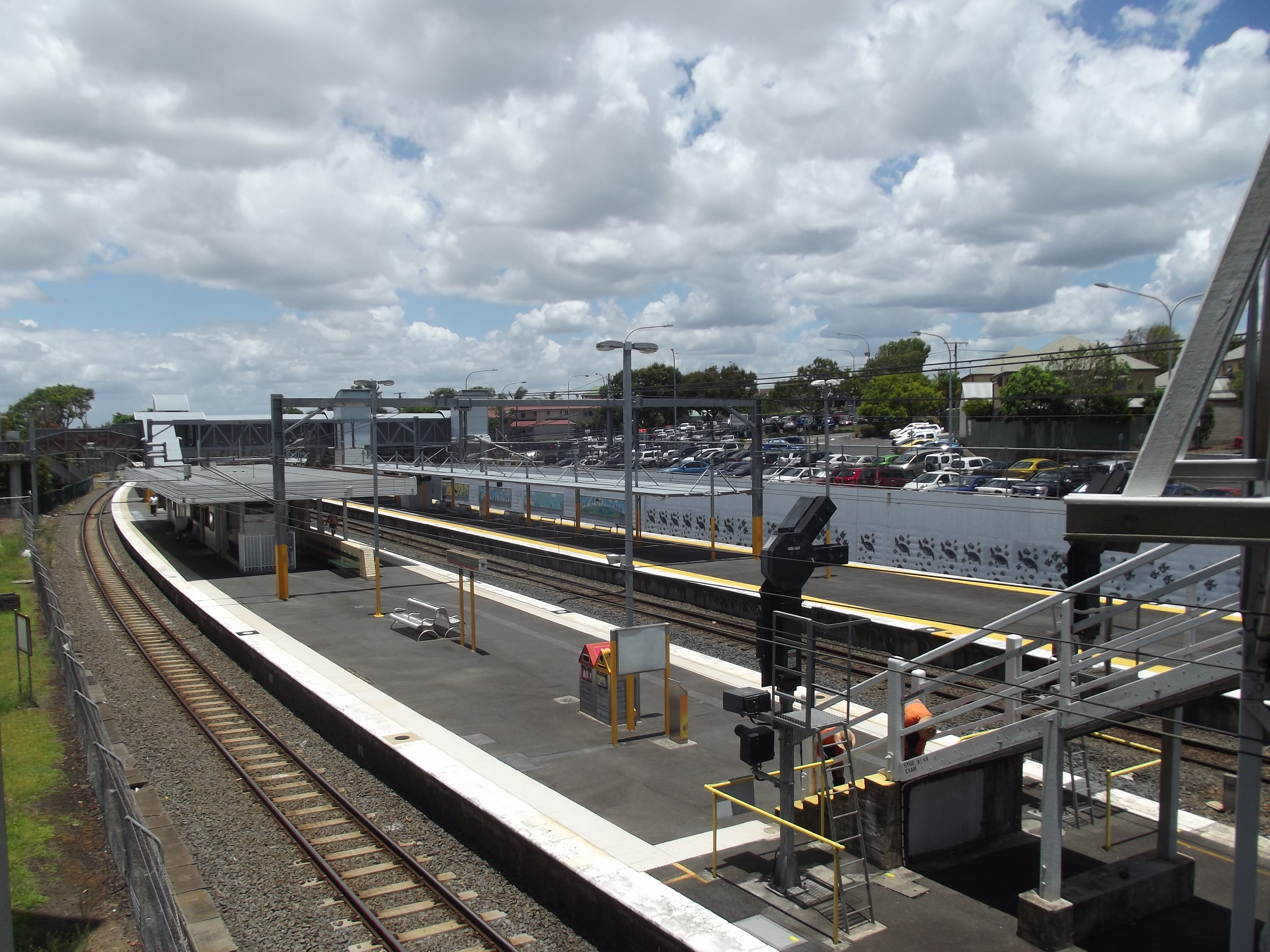
- Southbound view from Platform 1 in December 2012

General information
- Location: Ridge Street, Northgate
- Coordinates: 27.3929°S 153.0693°E
- Owner: Queensland Rail
- Operator: Queensland Rail
- Lines: T1 Caboolture; T2 Kippa-Ring; T4 Shorncliffe; T1 Sunshine Coast
- Distance: 9.90 kilometres from Central
- Platforms: 4 (2 islands)

Construction
- Structure type: Ground
- Parking: 383 bays
- Accessible: Yes

Other information
- Status: Staffed
- Station code: 600407 (platform 1); 600408 (platform 2); 600409 (platform 3); 600410 (platform 4)
- Fare zone: Zone 1/2
- Website: Queensland Rail

History
- Opened: 1882; 144 years ago
- Former names: Toombul; Northgate Junction

Services
Preceding station	Queensland Rail	Following station
Eagle Junction towards Ipswich or Rosewood via Roma Street	T1 Caboolture line	Petrie towards Caboolture
Eagle Junction towards Springfield Central via Roma Street	T2 Kippa-Ring line	Virginia towards Kippa-Ring
Nundah towards Cleveland via Roma Street	T4 Shorncliffe line	Bindha towards Shorncliffe
Eagle Junction towards Ipswich or Rosewood via Roma Street	T1 Sunshine Coast line	Petrie towards Nambour or Gympie North
Bowen Hills towards Ipswich or Rosewood via Roma Street	T1 Sunshine Coast line Gympie North service	Petrie towards Nambour or Gympie North
Location

Northgate is a railway station operated by Queensland Rail on the Caboolture, Redcliffe Peninsula, Shorncliffe and Sunshine Coast lines. It opened in 1882 and serves the Brisbane suburb of Northgate. It is a ground level station, featuring two island platforms with two faces each.

== History ==
Northgate station opened in 1882 as Toombul with the opening of the North Coast line. It was later renamed Northgate Junction and then shortened to Northgate.

== Services ==
Northgate is served by Caboolture, Redcliffe Peninsula, Sunshine Coast & Shorncliffe line services. Also see Inner City timetable

== Platforms and services ==
Northgate platform arrangement
Platform	Line	Destination	Notes
1	T4 Shorncliffe	Shorncliffe	1 evening peak service only
1	T4 Shorncliffe	Roma Street (to Cleveland line)	
2	T4 Shorncliffe	Shorncliffe	
2	T4 Shorncliffe	Roma Street (to Cleveland line)	
3	Ipswich	Roma Street (to Ipswich/Rosewood line)	
3	Springfield	Roma Street (to Springfield line)	
4	Caboolture	Caboolture line	
4	Redcliffe Peninsula	Kippa-Ring	
4	Sunshine Coast	Nambour or Gympie North	

== Transport links ==
Transport for Brisbane operates one bus route via Northgate station:

- 306: Nudgee Beach to Cultural Centre busway station
