= Shorncliffe line =

Passenger rail service in Queensland, Australia

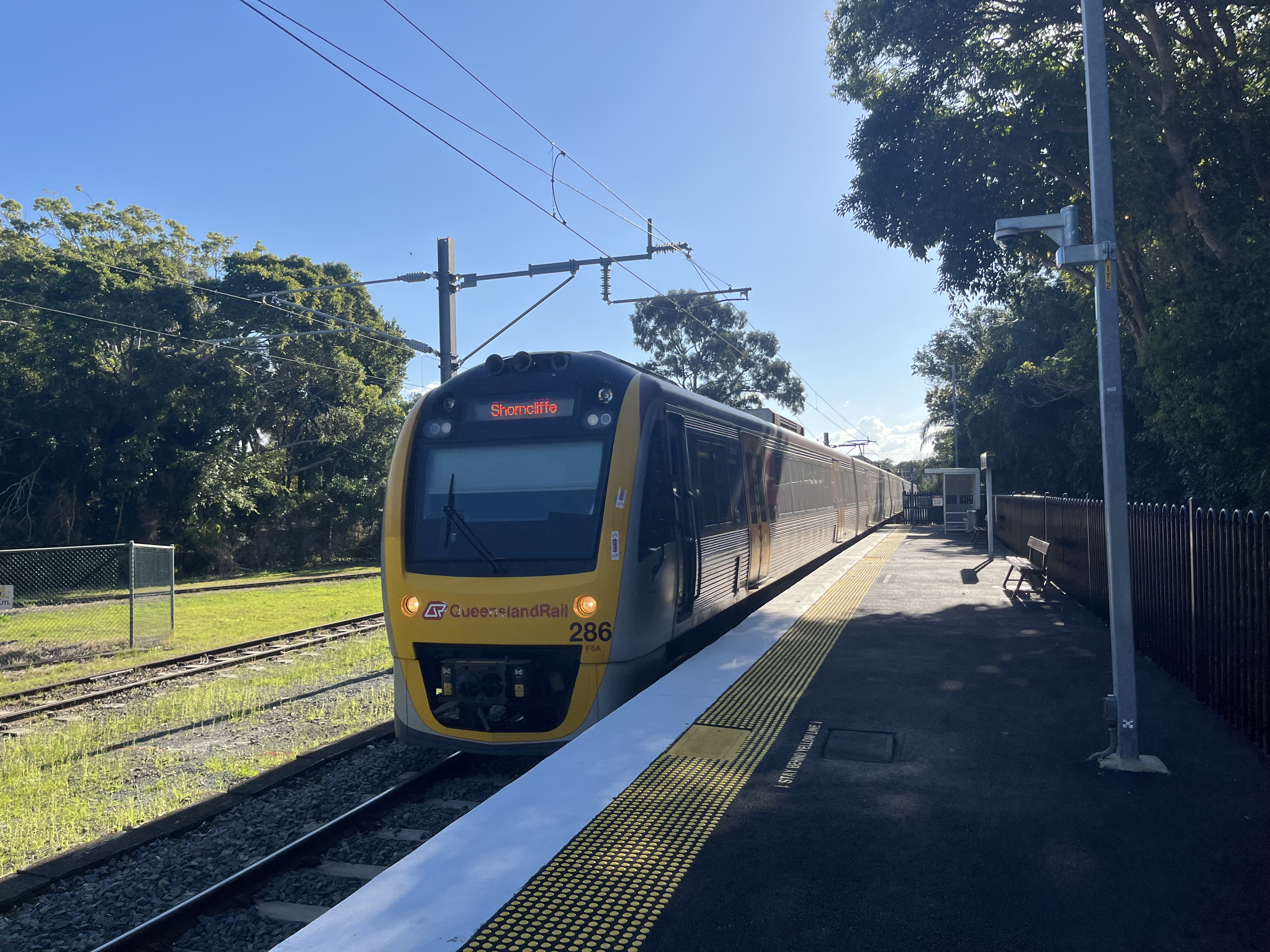
- IMU 286 arriving into Shorncliffe station

Overview
- Website: queenslandrail.com.au

Technical
- Line length: 11 km (6.8 mi)
- Number of tracks: Quadruple to Northgate, double to Sandgate, single track to Shorncliffe.
- Track gauge: 1,067 mm (3 ft 6 in)
- Electrification: 1982
- Operating speed: 100 km/h (62 mph)

The T4 Shorncliffe line is a suburban commuter railway line in Brisbane, Queensland, Australia. Operated by Queensland Rail, the line runs for 21.5 kilometres (13 miles) from Shorncliffe to Roma Street, where services continue on the Cleveland line.

== History ==
The Sandgate Railway, opened in 1882, was the first truly suburban railway in Brisbane, built to provide convenient access to the seaside for the city's residents. The terminus was originally named Sandgate and was renamed Shorncliffe in 1938. The current Sandgate station was originally named Sandgate Central. The line allowed Brisbane residents to travel to Moreton Bay's shoreline at Shorncliffe.

Duplication was completed by December 1901.

Trains to Sandgate originally travelled via what is now the Exhibition line prior to the opening of the tunnel between Central and Brunswick Street in 1890. The Shorncliffe line is currently being used as a pilot test for the implementation of ETCS, (European Train Control System), prior to its introduction with Cross River Rail.

On 10 August 2026, the Shorncliffe line was numbered T4 (along with the Cleveland line) by Translink.

== Network and operations ==
=== Stations ===
List of T4 Shorncliffe line stations
T4 Shorncliffe line
Station	Image	Suburb	Opened	Terrain	Connections	Time (Note: Travel time in minutes from Roma Street.)
	Continues from T4 Cleveland line					
Roma Street		Brisbane CBD	14 June 1875	Ground	Ipswich/Rosewood line Redcliffe Peninsula line Cleveland line Gold Coast line Beenleigh line Brisbane Metro Bus transport in Queensland	0
Central		Brisbane CBD	18 August 1889	Built over	Redcliffe Peninsula line Shorncliffe line Airport line, Brisbane Ferny Grove line	2 (Note: Service dwells for 2 minutes.)
Fortitude Valley		Fortitude Valley	1 November 1890	Underground	Redcliffe Peninsula line Shorncliffe line Airport line, Brisbane Ferny Grove line	6
Bowen Hills		Bowen Hills	1973	Ground	Redcliffe Peninsula line Shorncliffe line Airport line, Brisbane Ferny Grove line	9
Albion		Albion	1882	Ground	Shorncliffe line Airport line, Brisbane	13
Wooloowin		Wooloowin	1882	Ground	Shorncliffe line Airport line, Brisbane	15
Eagle Junction		Clayfield	1882	Ground	Sunshine Coast line, Queensland Redcliffe Peninsula line Shorncliffe line Airport line, Brisbane	17
Toombul		Toombul	1882	Ground	none	19
Nundah		Nundah	1882	Ground	none	21
Northgate		Northgate	1882	Ground	Sunshine Coast line, Queensland Redcliffe Peninsula line	23
Bindha		Virginia	1947	Ground	none	26
Banyo		Banyo	1882	Ground	none	28
Nudgee		Nudgee	1882	Ground	none	30
Boondall		Boondall	1882	Ground	none	33
North Boondall		Boondall	1882	Ground	none	35
Deagon		Deagon	1887	Ground	none	37
Sandgate		Sandgate	1882	Ground	none	39
Shorncliffe		Shorncliffe	1897	Ground	none	41
