= Manly railway station =

Railway station in Queensland, Australia

Manly
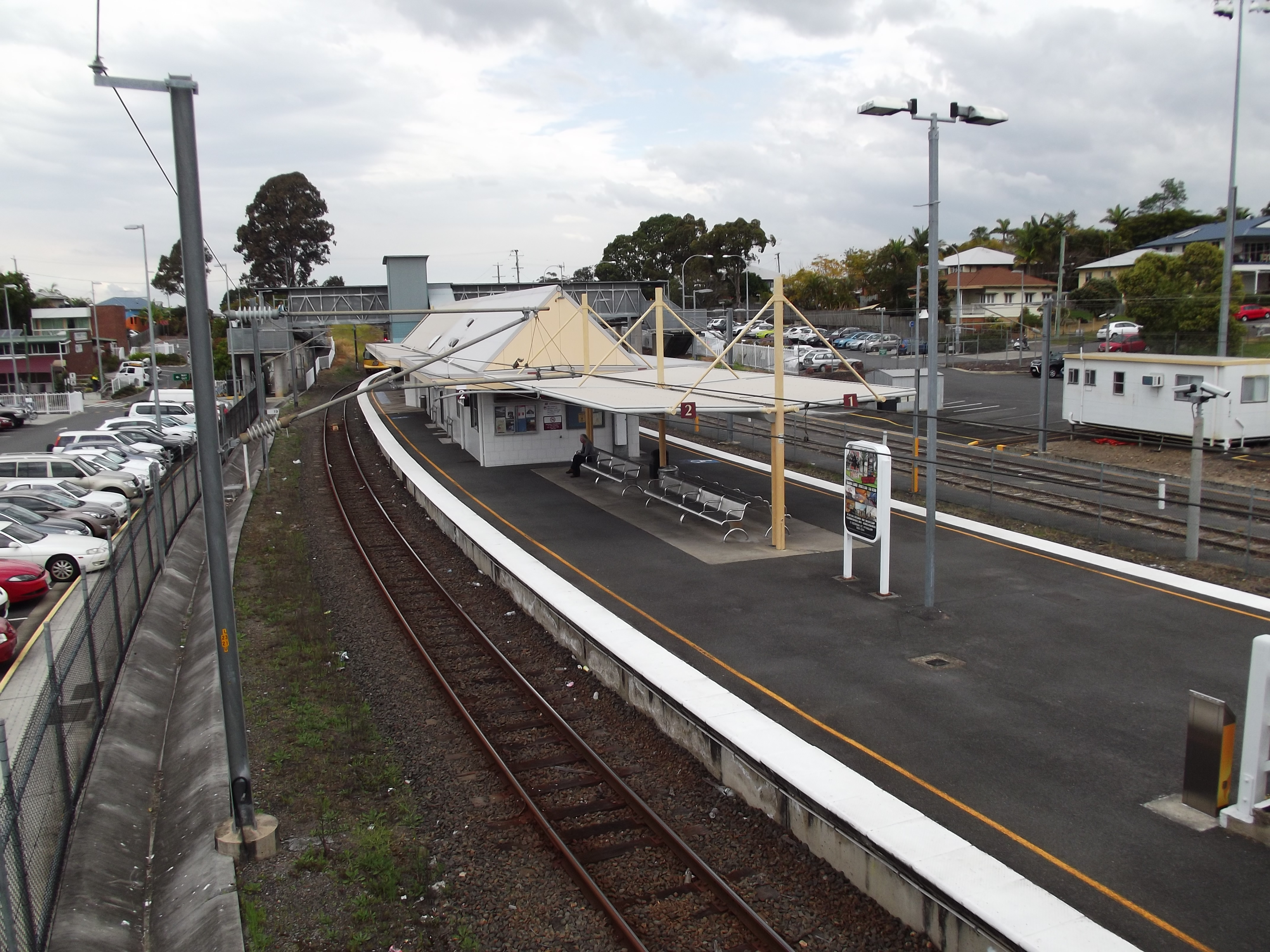
- Northbound view of Platform 1, August 2012

General information
- Location: Ernest Street, Manly
- Coordinates: 27°27′24″S 153°10′49″E
- Owner: Queensland Rail
- Operator: Queensland Rail
- Line: T4 Cleveland
- Distance: 24.08 kilometres from Central
- Platforms: 2 (1 island)
- Tracks: 2

Construction
- Structure type: Ground
- Parking: 219 bays
- Cycle facilities: Yes
- Accessible: Assisted

Other information
- Station code: 600630 (platform 1); 600631 (platform 2)
- Fare zone: Zone 2
- Website: Translink

History
- Opened: 1888
- Rebuilt: 1992

Services
Preceding station	Queensland Rail	Following station
Wynnum Central towards Shorncliffe	Cleveland line	Lota towards Cleveland
Location

Manly is a railway station operated by Queensland Rail on the Cleveland line. It opened on 1 November 1889 and serves the Brisbane suburb of Manly. It is a ground level station, featuring one island platform with two faces.

== The Manly Myth ==
Arising from a previous edit of this page, a myth has arisen that the Cleveland Railway Line was opened in two stages - firstly to Manly in 1888 on an unspecified date; and then extended to Cleveland in 1889, the date again unspecified. This myth was referenced with a false attribution to the renowned late railway historian John Kerr. The reference to Kerr's book, "Triumph of the Narrow Gauge", did not include any page references.

Rather than referring to a Manly opening and then a Cleveland extension, Kerr stated in "Triumph of the Narrow Gauge" that "Parliament approved it (the railway) a year later but it was 1 May 1888 before the contract was awarded to G. C. Willcocks. He completed it on time, and it opened on 1 November 1889." Nothing in this quote suggests that the Cleveland line was opened firstly to Manly at some unspecified time in 1888, and then extended to Cleveland. Moreover, on pages 224-225 of "Triumph of the Narrow Gauge" Kerr lists the opening dates of Queensland's railways, commencing with the Main Line from Brisbane. In respect of Cleveland, Kerr lists the line's opening from Albert to Cleveland Central on 1 November 1889, and then from Cleveland Central to Cleveland on 20 December 1897. Cleveland Central was the original terminus of the line, at that time called Cleveland. Upon the opening of a 0.72 mile extension in 1897, the new station took the name Cleveland and the old Cleveland was renamed Cleveland West. Cleveland West was also sometimes called West Cleveland, particularly in the media. In 1925 Cleveland West's name was changed to Cleveland Central.

== History ==
Manly station opened on 1 November 1889.

In 1992, the original timber station was demolished after becoming infested with termites. To the west of the station lies a City network stabling yard.

== Services ==
Manly is served by Cleveland line services from Shorncliffe, Northgate, Doomben and Bowen Hills to Cleveland.

During morning peak hour (6am-8am), Manly is served by both express and all stop services. 6 inbound services originate at Manly, stopping all stations, while 6 more inbound services originate at Cleveland and run express between Manly and Murrarie. 6 outbound services also terminate at Manly, while 5 outbound services run express Murrarie-Manly before continuing to Cleveland.

During afternoon peak hour (5pm-6pm), Manly is again served by both express and all stops services. 4 outbound services terminate at Manly, while 4 more outbound services run express Murrarie-Manly before continuing to Cleveland. 4 inbound services also originate at Manly, while 4 outbound services run express Manly-Murrarie before continuing to Roma Street, typically as T4 Shorncliffe Line services.

== Platforms and services ==
Manly platform arrangement
Platform	Line	Destination	Notes
1	T4 Cleveland	Roma Street (to Shorncliffe line)	
2	T4 Cleveland	Cleveland	

During peak hour some services depart from different platforms.
