= Cleveland line =

Passenger rail service in Queensland, Australia

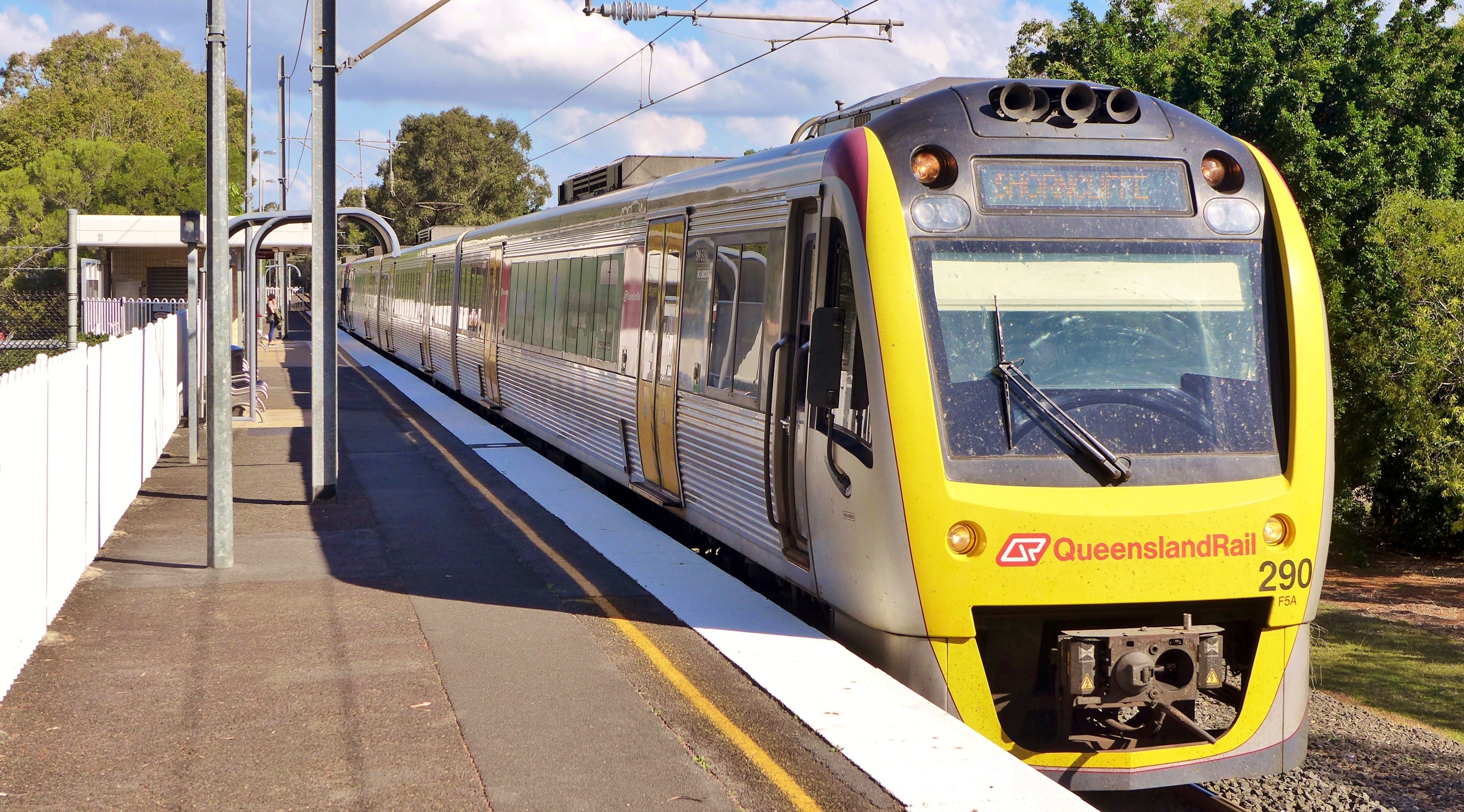
- Shorncliffe-bound train at Ormiston in 2017

Overview
- Website: queenslandrail.com.au

Technical
- Track length: 37.3 km (23.2 mi)
- Num of tracks: Triple to Lindum, double to Manly, single track with passing loops to Cleveland.
- Track gauge: 1,067 mm (3 ft 6 in)
- Electrification: 1982–1988

The T4 Cleveland line is a suburban commuter railway line in Brisbane, Queensland, Australia. Operated by Queensland Rail, the line runs for 36.5 kilometres (23 miles) from Cleveland to Roma Street, where services continue on the Shorncliffe line.

== History ==
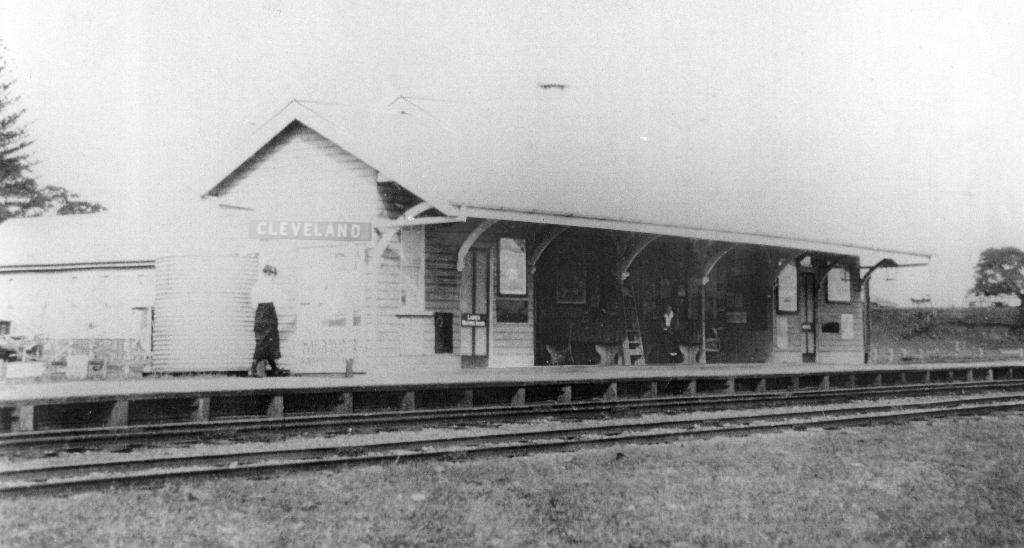
The original Cleveland station in 1890

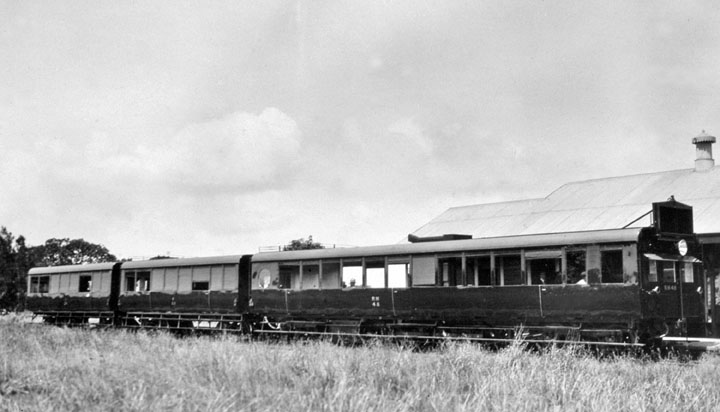
150hp Winton rail motor for Manly – Cleveland service, Cleveland station 1930

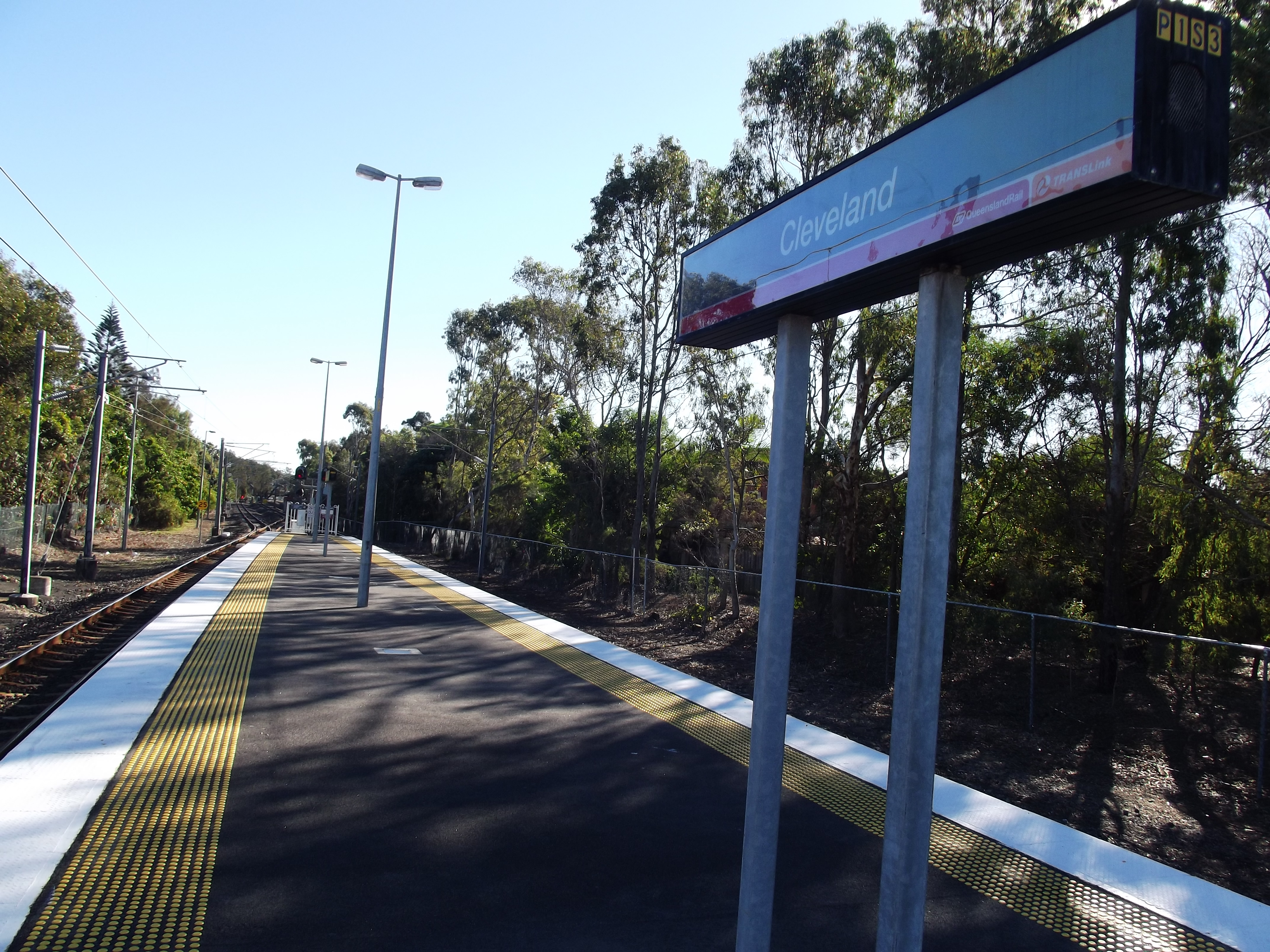
Cleveland railway station

Following the opening of the Wooloongabba Branch railway line from Corinda to Stanley Street in South Brisbane in 1884, calls were made for extending the line to Cleveland to serve the developing farming area. A line was surveyed, and took an indirect route to avoid hilly country and to serve Fort Lytton, a gun emplacement at the south entrance to the Brisbane River, then the major defence installation for the city.

A Parliamentary Plan and Section for the Cleveland Branch Line was approved by parliament on 26 November 1886. It would take until 1 May 1888 for a contract to be entered into. The contract with G.C. Willcocks was for the construction of the 20 mile 52 chain line from Albert (on the South Brisbane Branch Line) to Cleveland. The contract price was £91,498 16s 7d and provided for a completion date on 1 November 1889. Eighteen months after the contract date and on the day set for completion,1 November 1889, the line from Albert to Cleveland opened. An extension to the second Cleveland station opened on 20 December 1897, at which time the first Cleveland station was renamed West Cleveland (later Cleveland Central).

The initial constricted terminus at Stanley St was replaced by a dual track line to South Brisbane in 1891, and the Cleveland line connection to it was realigned to junction at Park Road railway station (now known as Boggo Road) at that time.

An extension of the Cleveland railway line to Redland Bay and Mount Cotton was surveyed in 1889 and a Parliamentary Plan and Section presented to the parliament in 1890. The plan failed to pass. The extension to Redland Bay was recommended by the Royal Commission into Public Works in 1922, but was never built.

Duplication on the line from Park Road began construction in 1910. The duplication was opened progressively, with the Park Road to Murarrie section opening on 17 June 1912. Duplication from Hemmant to Manly opened on 8 December 1912. The remaining section between Hemmant and Murarrie was completed in 1913.

In 1960, the line from Lota to Cleveland was closed. The Redland Shire Council opposed the closure, and preserved the corridor.

The opening of the Merivale Bridge in 1978 connected the Cleveland (and Beenleigh) line to the Brisbane CBD, and the line was electrified in 1982.

The line beyond Lota was rebuilt to contemporary standards (50 kg/m (101 lb/yd) rail, maximum 1 in 50 (2%) grades and minimum 430 m (1,410 ft) radius curves) and reopened on the original alignment to Thorneside in 1982 and the line was electrified in 1983.

The line was extended to the third Cleveland station (formerly Raby Bay) in 1987, reputedly to facilitate potential extension of the line to Redland Bay in the future, being electrified upon opening. The travel time of 46 minutes compares to the steam-era time of 82–86 minutes.

A third line was laid between Park Road and Lindum railway station in the 1990s as part of the Fisherman Islands line to provide a dedicated freight track to the Port of Brisbane, being dual gauge to connect to the Acacia Ridge freight Terminal and the Australian standard gauge rail network.

On 10 August 2026, the Cleveland line was numbered T4 (along with the Shorncliffe line) by Translink.

== Line guide and services ==
Most services stop at all stations to Bowen Hills railway station. Service originate from Cleveland, or in the interpeak, Cannon Hill. The typical travel time between Cleveland and Brisbane City is approximately 56 minutes (to Central). During weekday peak times, a few services run express between Murarrie and Manly stations, for faster travel times for commuters working in the Brisbane central business district. Prior to 2014, an afternoon service on school days only operated express between Cleveland and Buranda stations, stopping only at Thorneside, Manly and Lota.

Cleveland line services typically continue as Shorncliffe line services.

Passengers for/from the Beenleigh and Gold Coast lines can change at Boggo Road; Ipswich, Springfield and Rosewood lines at Roma Street; and Airport, Doomben and Northern lines (see list below) at Central.

=== Stations ===
List of T4 Cleveland line stations
T4 Cleveland line
Station	Image	Suburb	Opened	Terrain	Connections	Time (Note: Travel time in minutes from Roma Street.)
	Continues from T4 Shorncliffe line					
Roma Street		Brisbane CBD	14 June 1875	Ground	Sunshine Coast line, Queensland Redcliffe Peninsula line Doomben Airport line, Brisbane Ferny Grove line Brisbane Metro Bus transport in Queensland	0
South Brisbane		South Brisbane	1884	Elevated	Gold Coast line Beenleigh line Brisbane Metro Bus transport in Queensland	5
South Bank		South Brisbane	21 December 1893	Elevated	Gold Coast line Beenleigh line Brisbane Metro Bus transport in Queensland	7
Boggo Road		Dutton Park	21 December 1891	Ground	Gold Coast line Beenleigh line Brisbane Metro Bus transport in Queensland	10
Buranda		Woolloongabba	1889	Ground	Brisbane Metro Bus transport in Queensland	12
Coorparoo		Coorparoo	1889	Ground	none	14
Norman Park		Norman Park	1911	Ground	none	16
Morningside		Morningside	1888	Ground	none	19
Cannon Hill		Cannon Hill	1910	Ground	none	22
Murarrie		Murarrie	1910	Ground	none	25
Hemmant		Hemmant	1914	Ground	none	29
Lindum		Wynnum West	1889	Ground	none	31
Wynnum North		Wynnum	1889	Ground	none	34
Wynnum		Wynnum	1889	Ground	none	35
Wynnum Central		Wynnum	1889	Ground	none	37
Manly		Manly	1889	Ground	none	40
Lota		Lota	1889	Ground	none	43
Thorneside		Thorneside	1889	Ground	none	47
Birkdale		Birkdale	1889	Ground	none	50
Wellington Point		Wellington Point	1889	Ground	none	54
Ormiston		Ormiston	1889	Ground	none	57
Cleveland		Cleveland	1914	Ground	none	60
