= Shorncliffe railway station =

Railway station in Queensland, Australia

Shorncliffe
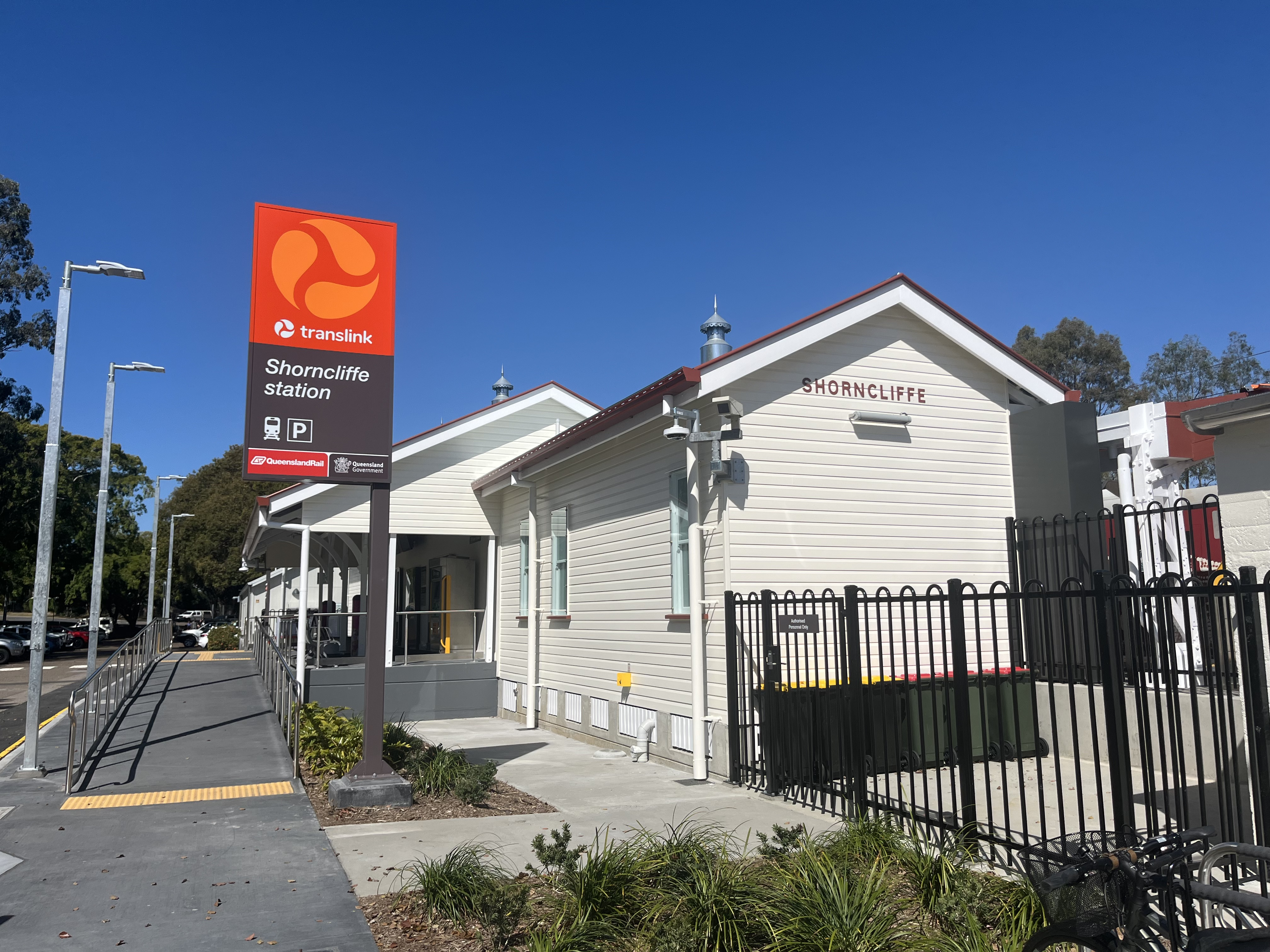
- Station front in September 2026

General information
- Location: Railway Parade, Shorncliffe
- Coordinates: 27°19′36″S 153°04′47″E
- Elevation: 2 m (6 ft 7 in)
- Owner: Queensland Rail
- Operator: Queensland Rail
- Line: T4 Shorncliffe
- Distance: 20.69 kilometres from Central
- Platforms: 1
- Tracks: 1

Construction
- Structure type: Ground
- Parking: 80 bays
- Accessible: Yes

Other information
- Status: Staffed
- Station code: 600425
- Fare zone: Zone 2
- Website: Queensland Rail

History
- Opened: 1897; 129 years ago
- Former names: Sandgate

Services
Preceding station	Queensland Rail	Following station
Sandgate towards Cleveland	Shorncliffe line	Terminus
Location

Shorncliffe is a railway station operated by Queensland Rail, which serves as the terminus of the Shorncliffe line. It opened in 1897 and serves the Brisbane suburb of Shorncliffe. It is a ground level station, featuring one side platform.

== History ==
The railway line from Brisbane to Sandgate opened in 1882, and the terminal station, located near Curlew Street, was named Sandgate. The line was extended to Shorncliffe in 1897, and the name Sandgate was transferred to the new terminal station. In 1938 it was renamed Shorncliffe.

The line allowed Brisbane residents to travel to the water of Moreton Bay's Shorncliffe shoreline. Beyond the station lie two sidings used to stable trains overnight.

In November 2025, the station begun work on an extensive renewal and accessibility upgrade project. The station reopened on 27 July 2026.

== Services ==
Shorncliffe is the terminus station for Shorncliffe line services to and from Roma Street, Cannon Hill, Manly and Cleveland.

== Platforms and services ==
Shorncliffe platform arrangement
Platform	Line	Destination	Notes
1	T4 Shorncliffe	Roma Street (to Cleveland line)	
