= Cleveland railway station =

Railway station in Queensland, Australia

Cleveland
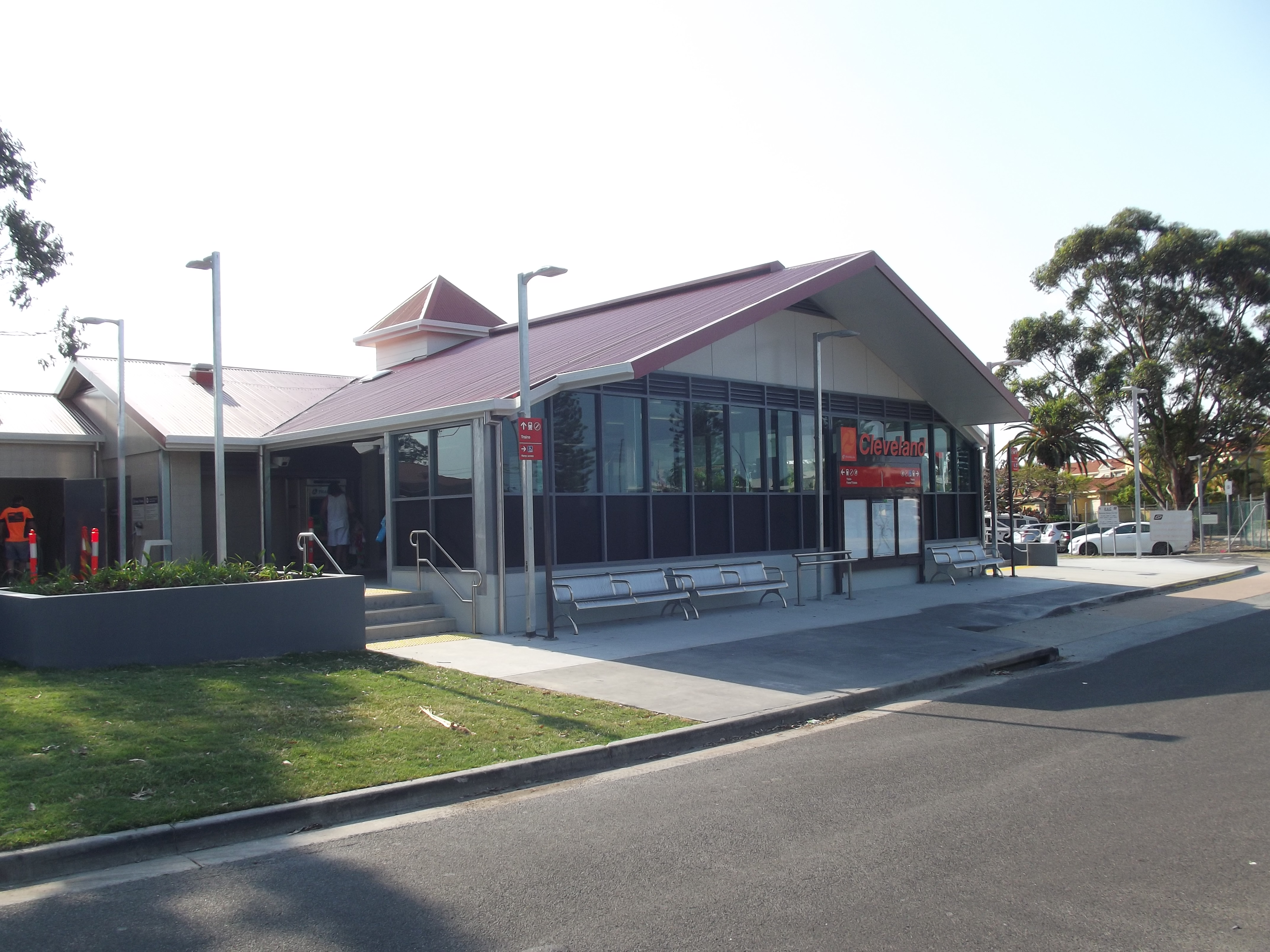
- Station building and entrance, October 2012

General information
- Location: Shore Street, Cleveland
- Coordinates: 27°31′27″S 153°15′58″E
- Owner: Queensland Rail
- Operator: Queensland Rail
- Line: T4 Cleveland
- Distance: 37.29 kilometres from Central
- Platforms: 2 (1 island)
- Tracks: 2

Construction
- Structure type: Ground
- Parking: 238 bays
- Cycle facilities: Yes
- Accessible: Yes

Other information
- Station code: 600277 (platform 1); 600278 (platform 2)
- Fare zone: Zone 3
- Website: Queensland Rail

History
- Opened: 1914
- Rebuilt: 1987
- Former names: Raby Bay

Services
Preceding station	Queensland Rail	Following station
Ormiston towards Shorncliffe	Cleveland line	Terminus
Location

Cleveland is a railway station operated by Queensland Rail on the Cleveland line. It opened in 1914 and serves the Redlands suburb of Cleveland. It is a ground level station, featuring one island platform with two faces.

== History ==
=== Cleveland Central ===
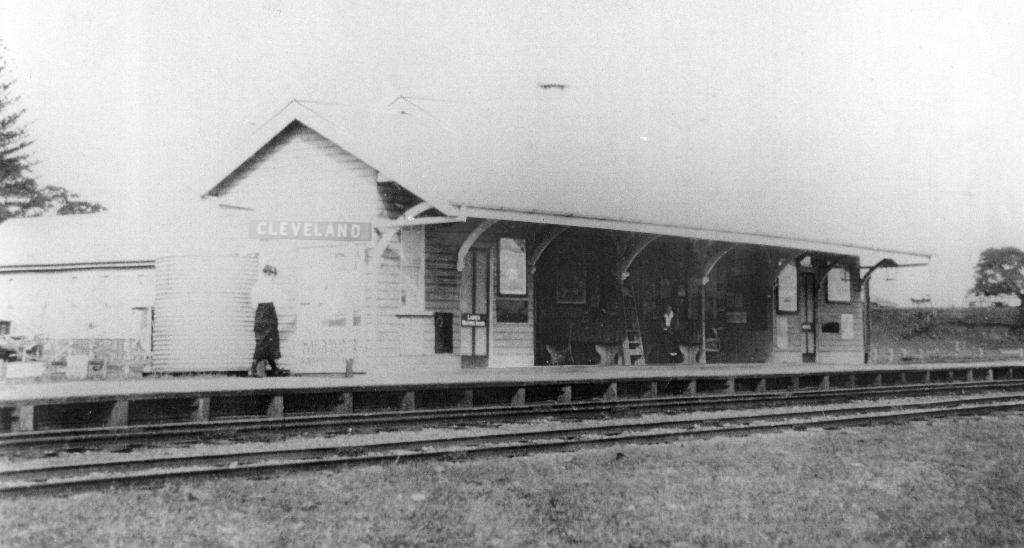
The original Cleveland railway station in 1890

In 1889, the Cleveland line was extended from Manly to the original Cleveland station (27.5248°S 153.278025°E). When the line was extended towards Cleveland point in 1897, the new terminus was named Cleveland and the former terminus was named West Cleveland. It was then renamed Cleveland Central in 1914.

Almost all the farm produce from the Redlands was loaded onto rollingstock at Cleveland Central station. On the days which other produce were loaded, such as tomatoes, three separate trains were required. The farmers brought their produce to the loading site in fruit wagons drawn by two horses and spring carts with one horse. More successful farmers transported produce using a Model T Ford one ton truck.

The station closed in 1960 with the closure of the railway beyond Lota. The site of the station is now part of Linear Park on the eastern side of Ross Creek.

Following the closure of the station, the station master's house was moved to Middle Street in front of the Cleveland RSL. On 12 July 2017, the building was moved to a new location on Shore Street North to make way for a redevelopment of the Cleveland RSL.

=== Second Cleveland station ===
In 1897, the line was extended to the second Cleveland station (27.520615°S 153.2865°E). The station closed in 1960 with the closure of the railway beyond Lota. The site of the station is now part of Linear Park.

=== Current station ===
The current Cleveland station opened as the Raby Bay railway station in 1914. On 1 November 1960, the station closed when the line was truncated to Lota. When the station reopened on 24 October 1987, the former Raby Bay station became the third to carry the name Cleveland.

== Incidents ==
On 31 January 2013, a passenger train, IMU173, overshot the railway line and collided with the station, severely damaging a toilet block and the railway station and injuring 14 people. The train was removed from the station in the early hours of the following morning.

== Services ==
Cleveland is the terminus for Cleveland line services to and from Shorncliffe, Northgate, Doomben and Bowen Hills.

== Platforms and services ==
Cleveland platform arrangement
Platform	Line	Destination	Notes
1	T4 Cleveland	Roma Street (to Shorncliffe line)	
2	T4 Cleveland	Roma Street (to Shorncliffe line)	

== Transport links ==
Transdev Queensland operate seven bus routes via Cleveland station:

- 250: To Redland Bay or To Brisbane City via Carindale (Peak-Hour) or Carindale (Off-Peak)
- 252: to Capalaba via Ormiston and Alexandra Hills
- 255: to Birkdale via Wellington Point
- 258: To Toondah Harbour (best for SeaLink WaterTaxi to North Stradbroke Island)
- 272: To Victoria Point via Thornlands and Redland Hospital
- 274: To Victoria Point Jetty via Thornlands
- 275: To Thornlands or To Brisbane City via Capalaba (Peak Hour Service)
