= St Andrew's Church, Ormiston =

St Andrews Church, Ormiston
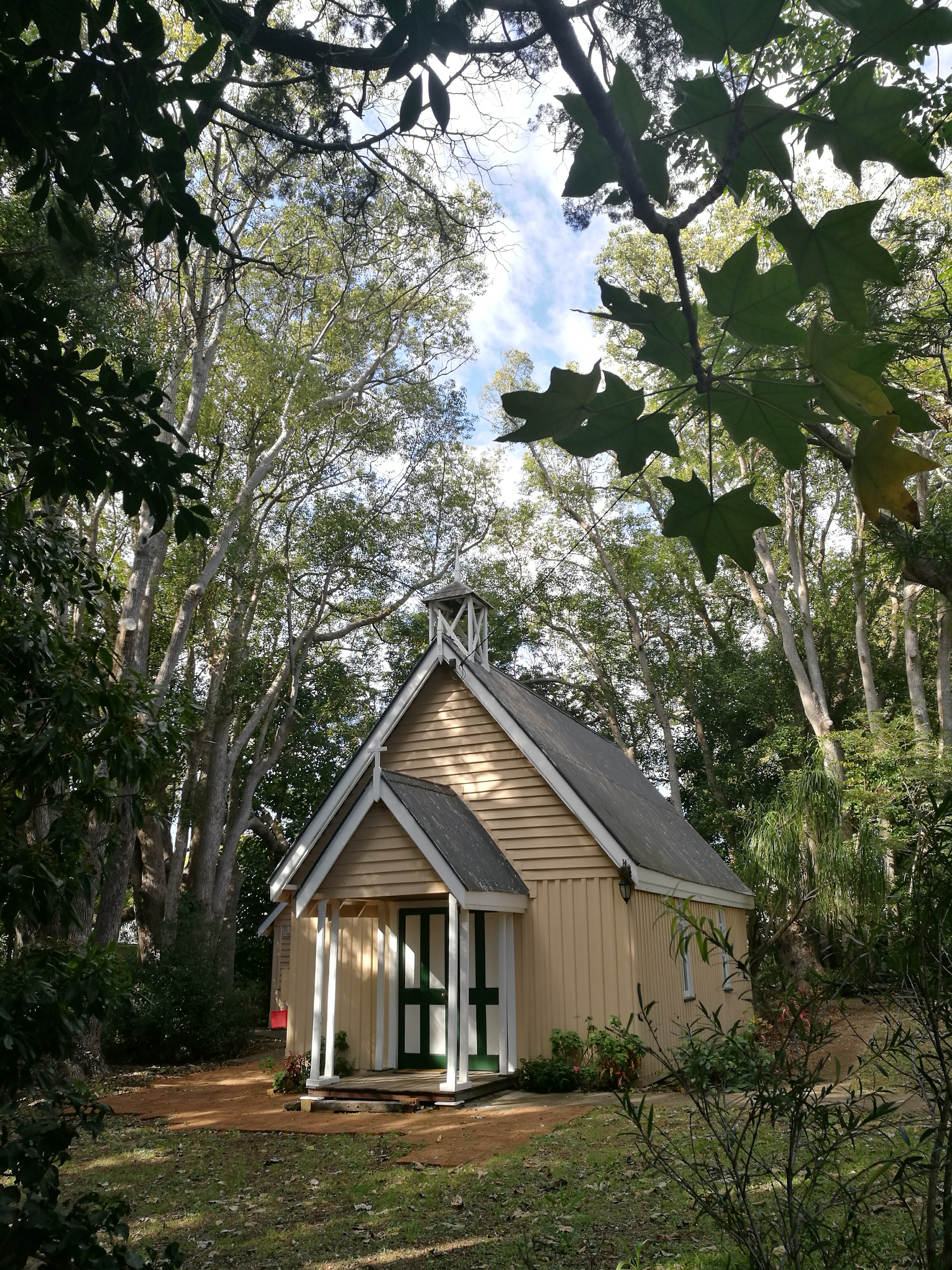
- The Historic Anglican Church of St Andrew, August 2017

- Location within Queensland Location within Australia
- 27.5028°S 153.2575°E
- Location: Wellington Street, Ormiston, City of Redland, Queensland, Australia

History
- Design period: 1840s–1860s (mid-19th century)
- Built: c. 1868

Queensland Heritage Register
- Official name: St Andrews Church
- Type: state heritage (built, landscape)
- Designated: 21 October 1992
- Reference no.: 600774
- Significant period: 1860s (historical); 1860s (fabric) ongoing (social)
- Significant components: trees/plantings, tower – bell / belfry, furniture/fittings, church

St Andrews Church is a heritage-listed Anglican church at Wellington Street, Ormiston, City of Redland, Queensland, Australia. It was built c. 1868. It was added to the Queensland Heritage Register on 21 October 1992.

== History ==
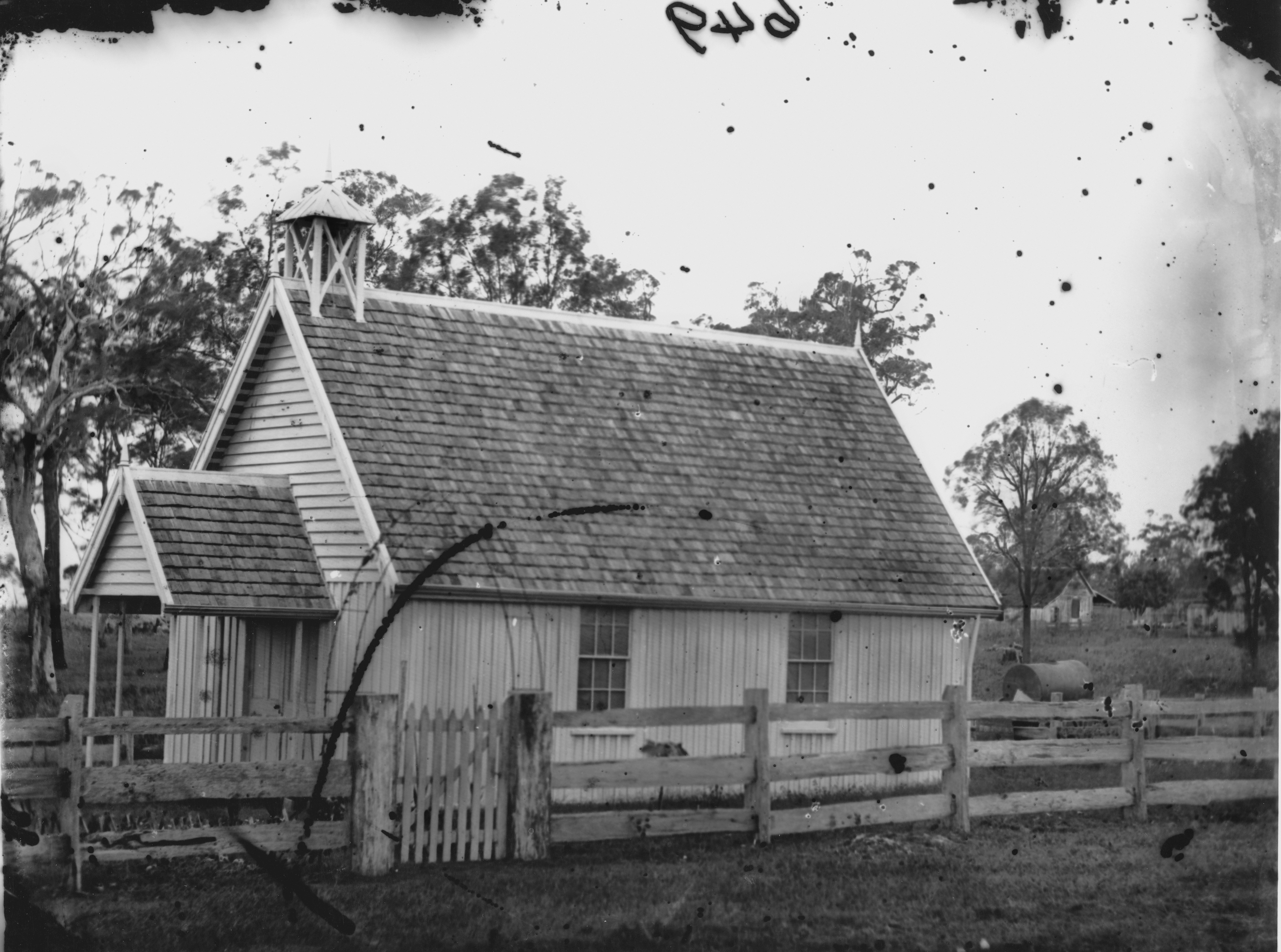
St Andrews Church of England, circa. 1871

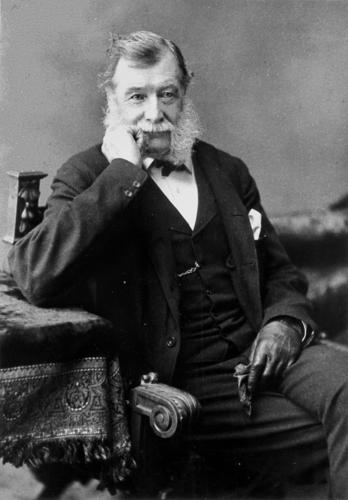
Captain Louis Hope

This board and batten timber church was erected on the Hon. Louis Hope's Ormiston estate c. 1868, as a private chapel, Sunday school and schoolhouse.

Hope had acquired land in the Raby Bay area in 1853–55 on which he created the Ormiston estate and sugar plantation, where the Hope family resided from c. 1864–65 until their departure for England in 1882. The immediate property surrounding Ormiston House comprised over 200 acres bounded by Raby Bay, Hilliards Creek and Eckersley Street, but Hope's holdings in the area also included large tracts of land between Hilliards and Tingalpa Creeks.

Hope was influential in establishing the sugar industry in Queensland, producing the colony's first commercially milled sugar at Ormiston in 1864. The land on which St Andrews Church stands was purchased by Hope from Thomas Lodge Murray-Prior in mid-1863. The chapel is believed to have been constructed by James Yorston, a Scottish employee on Hope's estate. The timber was cut at Ormiston, pit-sawn to size, and dressed and shaped with an adze.

Originally the chapel stood amongst bunya pines and a number of flowering trees. It was separated from the road by a three-rail split post and rail fence with a picket gate. The early building had a shingled roof and double-hung, six-paned sash windows, and rested directly on the ground with a cement floor. The chancel and vestry are later additions.

The chapel pre-dated the first Anglican church at Cleveland by at least six years. Initially services were conducted either by lay persons of by clergy from St Mary's Church of England parish. As well, the building served as a school for the children of employees on Hope's estate, until establishment of the Cleveland No.2 School (Ormiston State School) in 1872.

In 1882, the Hopes transferred the chapel on 0.2 hectares of land to the Anglican Church as a gift, and along with St Pauls at Cleveland (1874) it became part of the newly created Cleveland parish (1881). The church was never dedicated.

Major renovations were carried out in 1905 and 1920, and by 1924 substantial termite damage necessitated repairs. In the 1930s the building was standing on a brick plinth. In the 1960s the interior was lined and an inscription on the chancel arch was removed. Since the late 1950s the church has been maintained by the Friends of St Andrews, a non-denominational group. Services are still conducted there.

== Description ==
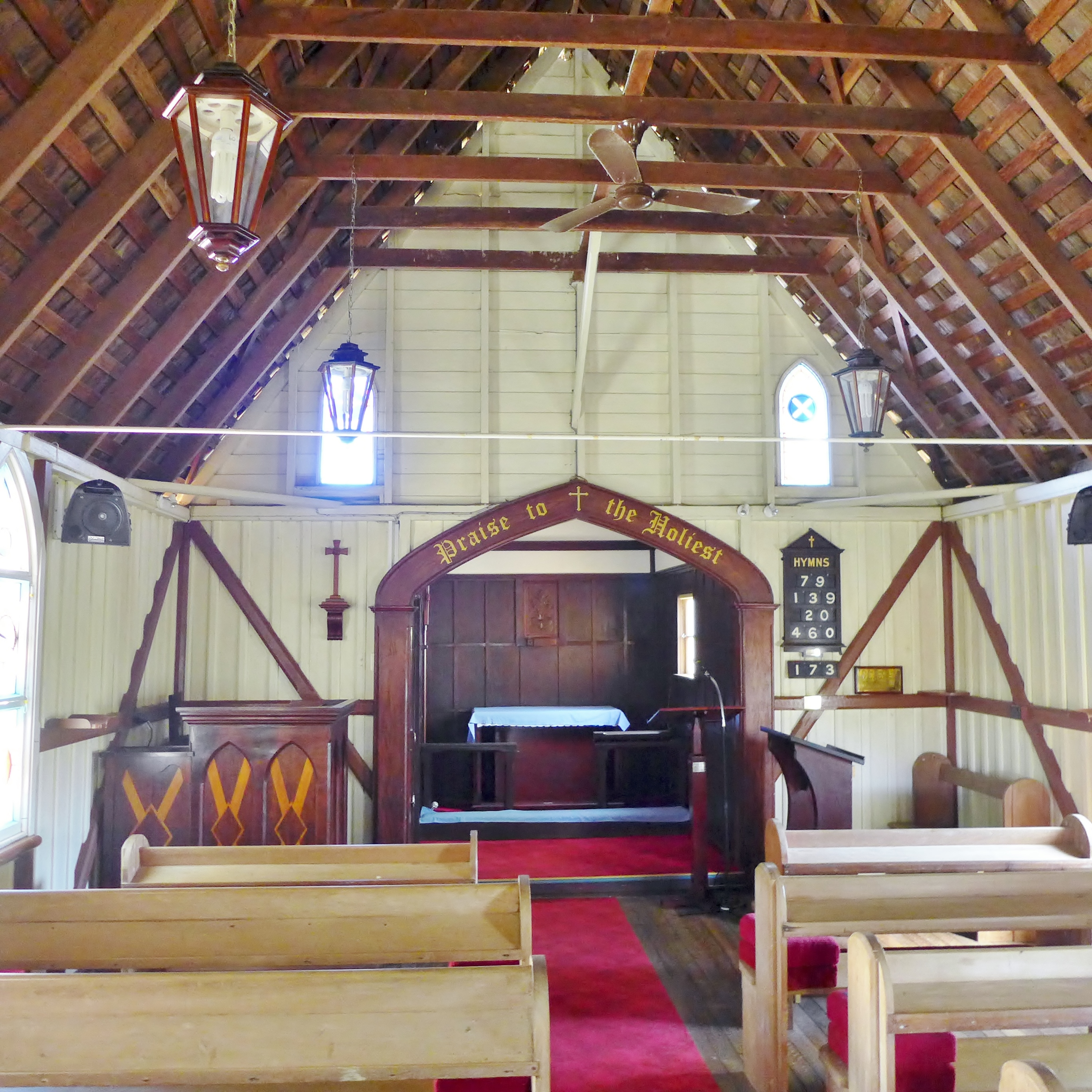
Interior, 2017

This is a small church of early, single-skin, board and batten construction. It is clearly seen from the road, framed and backed by mature trees. Its corrugated iron gable roof is aligned north-south, with a belfry over the northern entrance and a gable roof porch attached. The main entrance doors are four-panelled with early furniture. On the south, the gable roof chancel extends at a shallower angle to the east over a vestry addition. Finials decorate the belfry and northern end of the gable; the southern finial has been removed. The gutters have been removed recently. Windows to the nave are lancet-shaped with two rectangular sashes and a pointed fixed sash above, all with a central glazing bar. There are casements in the chancel and vestry.

Internally, the nave floor is of hardwood tongue and groove boarding. Floor boarding is pencil-edged in the porch, and shot-edged in the vestry. Hardboard lining which concealed the nave walls has been removed since 1987, exposing the boards and battens, which have been painted recently. Original shingles under the iron roof can be seen clearly over the nave, and remain unpainted. Pews are of scrubbed beech. The early structure of the church is evident and interesting in a picturesque setting.

== Heritage listing ==
St Andrews Church was listed on the Queensland Heritage Register on 21 October 1992 having satisfied the following criteria.

The place is important in demonstrating the evolution or pattern of Queensland's history.

St Andrew's Church at Ormiston, erected c. 1868, is significant historically for its association with the early development of European settlement in Cleveland, and with the Hon. Louis Hope and the establishment of the sugar industry in Queensland.

The place demonstrates rare, uncommon or endangered aspects of Queensland's cultural heritage.

It is significant as rare surviving evidence in southeast Queensland of board and batten construction, and for the intactness of the building and its fittings.

The place is important because of its aesthetic significance.

It is significant for the grace and integrity of its architectural form.

The place has a strong or special association with a particular community or cultural group for social, cultural or spiritual reasons.

The place has a community and spiritual association as the earliest Anglican church in the Cleveland parish.
