= St Paul's Anglican Church, Cleveland =

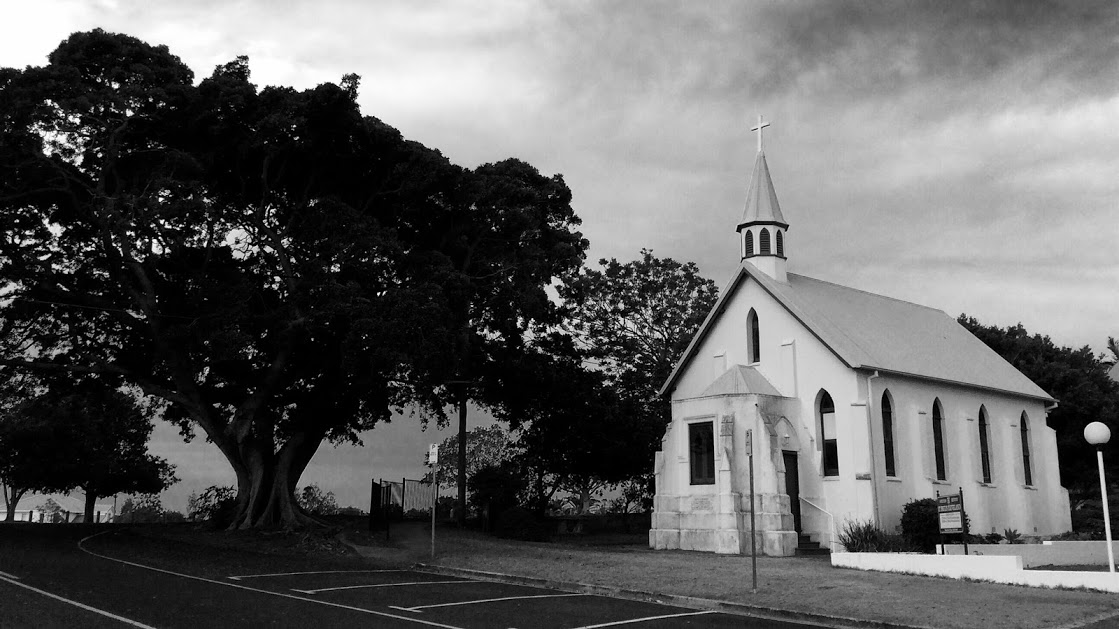
- St Paul's Anglican Church, Cleveland 2017

- Location within Queensland Location within Australia
- 27.5239°S 153.2842°E
- Location: Cross Street, Cleveland, City of Redland, Queensland, Australia

History
- Design period: 1870s–1890s (late 19th century)
- Built: 1873–1924

Site notes
- Architect: James Furnival
- Architectural style: Gothic

Queensland Heritage Register
- Official name: St Pauls Anglican Church
- Type: state heritage (landscape, built)
- Designated: 21 October 1992
- Reference no.: 600769
- Significant period: 1870s (historical)
- Significant components: church, spire, views to, trees/plantings

St Paul's Anglican Church is a heritage-listed church at Cross Street, Cleveland, City of Redland, Queensland, Australia. It was designed by James Furnival and built in 1873; it was extended in 1924 to a design by Lange Leopold Powell. It was added to the Queensland Heritage Register on 21 October 1992.

== History ==
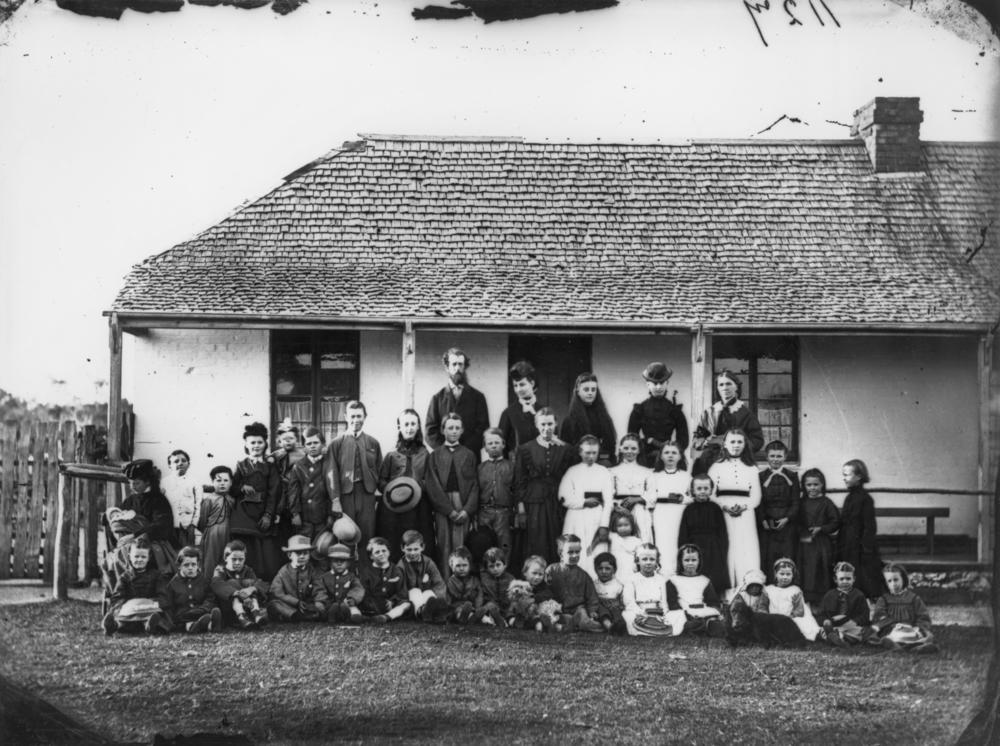
Sunday school class in the old Cleveland Court House, ca. 1871

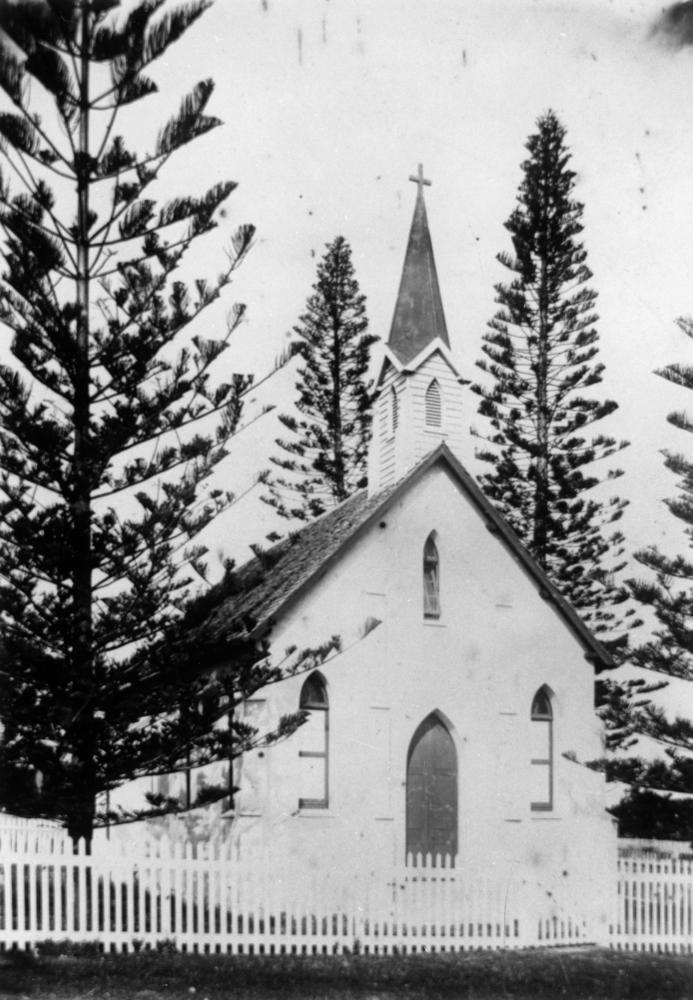
St. Paul's Church of England, Cleveland, ca. 1905

This small brick church was constructed in 1873–1874 for the Anglican congregation in Cleveland, on land donated in 1870 by George Thorn of Ipswich. Prior to this, services were held on the verandahs of the former Court House (c.1853) (now Ye Olde Court House Restaurant) and the Grandview Hotel (c. 1852).

St Paul's was the first Anglican church constructed at Cleveland. St Andrew's Church, at nearby Ormiston, was constructed c. 1868, but remained a private chapel for the use of the Hope family and employees, until transferred to the Anglican Church in 1882.

The Cleveland church was designed by Brisbane architect and engineer James T. Furnival, and was erected at a cost of nearly £500. The first service was held in 1874 and the church was consecrated on St Paul's Day (25 January), 1876. The first resident minister was appointed in 1877, and boundaries to the Parish of Cleveland were defined in 1878.

In 1898, the exterior walls, which were likely face brick work, were rendered. Asbestos roofing slates were substituted for the original wooden shingles in 1908, and an earlier weatherboarded and buttressed spire was replaced by the present structure in the same year.

In 1924, as a golden jubilee project, a porch designed by Brisbane architect Lange Leopold Powell was added, and some work was carried out to the foundations. It is not known if the weatherboard vestry removed in the early 1980s from the southern elevation of the chancel was part of the original construction. A free standing belfry, a picket fence and Norfolk Island pines have been removed as well.

In the 1980s, a new church was constructed adjacent to the 1873–1874 building. The earlier building is now principally a venue for youth activities.

== Description ==
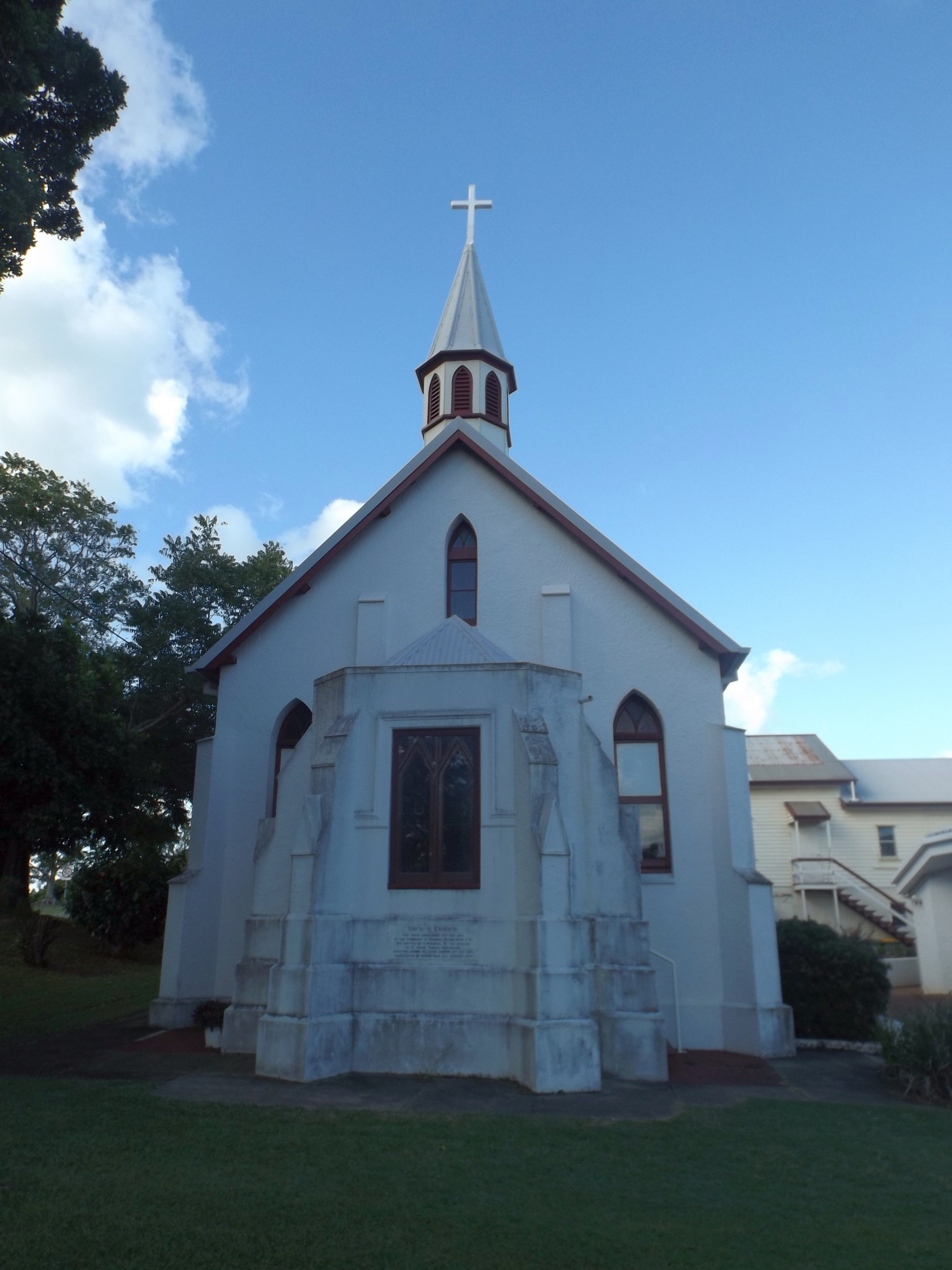
View from the Cross Street, 2015

It is a small brick church, now rough-cast and limewashed. Seen framed by spreading figs from the road approaching Cleveland Point, it is a simple gothic buttressed form with a heavier polygonal porch.

An octagonal spire stands on the southwest end of the ridge of a steep gabled roof, clad in asbestos cement slates. The spire, with pinnacle clad in smaller slates, has a lancet louvered vent to each face.

All windows in the original church and chancel are lancet shaped. There are four tall windows each side of the nave. The northeast chancel, attached under a smaller gable, is end-lit by three stained glass windows. A smaller window is placed under the main gable, centrally above the chancel roof. In the southwest wall there are windows either side of the porch, and a smaller one, central above the porch roof.

The porch, in rendered concrete, has more elaborate stepped buttresses, a hardboard ceiling and a concrete floor. A rectangular window, facing southwest, incorporates a pair of dominant lancet panes.

The position of the former vestry roof, on the southeast, is indicated by marks on the external render. A timber door leading from the church to the former vestry has been removed and the opening brick-filled and rendered.

Internally, moulded timber trusses span a nave of four bays. Moulded plaster surrounds frame the chancel arch. Walls are of white-washed plaster, with recent varnished vertical boarding around the walls of the nave. The ceiling is of beaded tongue and groove boarding.

The stone font, now painted, stands outside in a paved area, with low garden walls and planting contemporary with the adjacent 1980s church.

== Heritage listing ==
St Paul's Anglican Church was listed on the Queensland Heritage Register on 21 October 1992 having satisfied the following criteria.

The place is important in demonstrating the evolution or pattern of Queensland's history.

St Paul's Anglican Church, Cleveland, erected in 1873–74, is important in demonstrating the pattern of Queensland's history, being associated with early European settlement at Cleveland, and with post-separation expansion of the Anglican Church in Queensland.

The place is important in demonstrating the principal characteristics of a particular class of cultural places.

It is important in demonstrating the principal characteristics of a small, gothic-styled brick church of the 1870s.

The place is important because of its aesthetic significance.

It exhibits aesthetic characteristics valued by the community, including its picturesque form and its setting in the streetscape.
