= Barinia railway station =

Railway station in Queensland, Australia

Barinia

General information
- Location: Ormiston
- Coordinates: 27.5120°S 153.2563°E
- Owner: Queensland Rail
- Line: Cleveland line
- Platforms: 1 total (1 side platform)

History
- Opened: 1937
- Closed: 1960
Location

Barinia Station was a railway station on the Cleveland Line in Ormiston in the City of Redland, Queensland, Australia. It opened in 1937 for passengers only and had no goods facilities. It closed in 1960 with the closure of the railway beyond Lota and was demolished soon after. It was not rebuilt when the line was reopened in 1987.

It was located at 27.5120°S 153.2563°E on the bend between Ormiston railway station and Raby Bay railway station (now Cleveland railway station).
