= Ormiston Fellmongery =

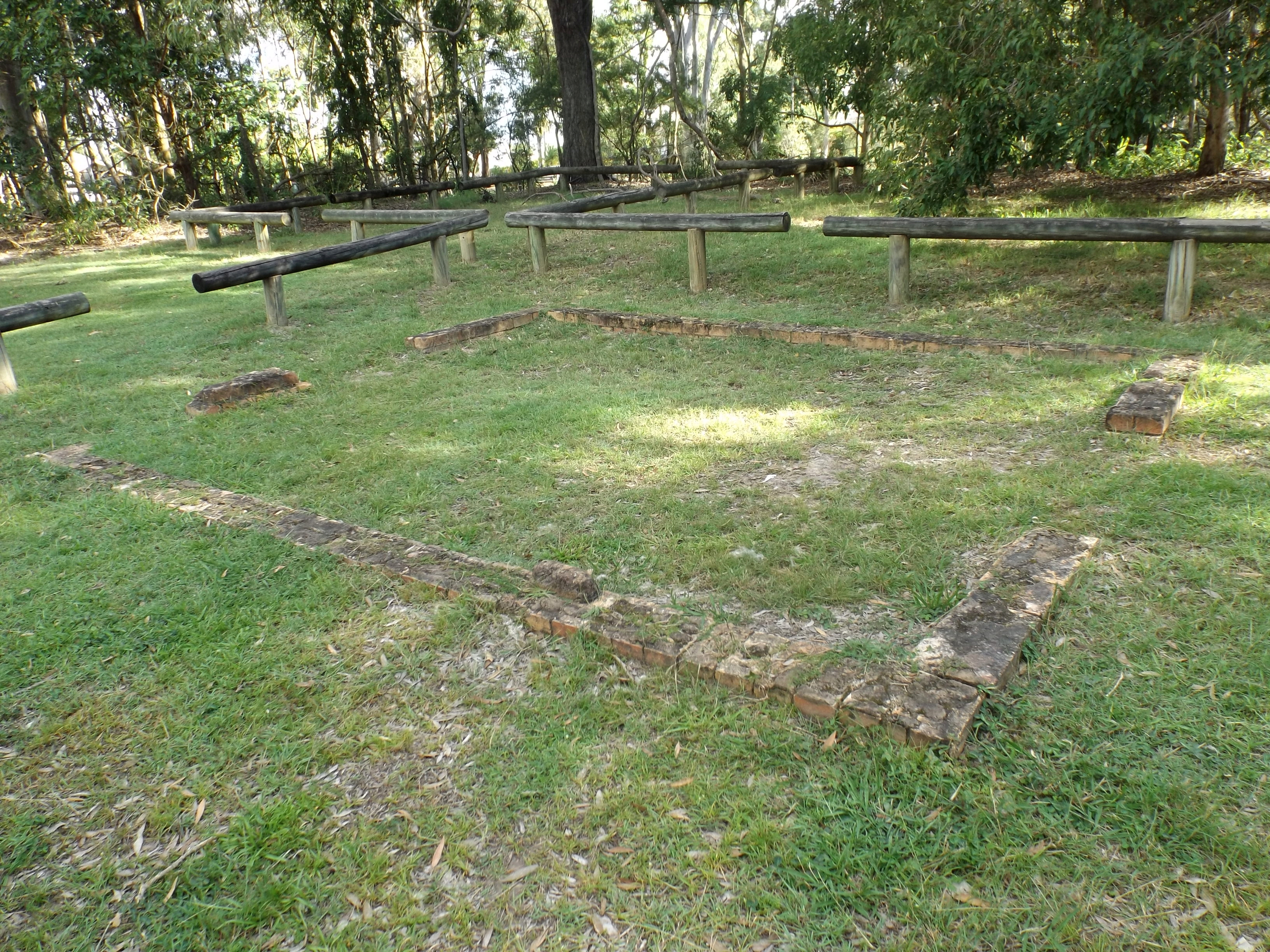
- Foundation remnants, 2015

- Location within Queensland Location within Australia
- 27.5109°S 153.2476°E
- Location: Sturgeon Street, Ormiston, City of Redland, Queensland, Australia

Queensland Heritage Register
- Official name: Ormiston Fellmongery, Fellmonger Park
- Type: archaeological
- Designated: 18 September 2009
- Reference no.: 645606
- Significant period: 1850s–1860s, 1890s–1920s (historical use)
- Significant components: building foundations/ruins

Ormiston Fellmongery is a heritage-listed archaeological site of a former wool scour and fellmongery at Sturgeon Street, Ormiston, City of Redland, Queensland, Australia. It is also known as Fellmonger Park. It was added to the Queensland Heritage Register on 18 September 2009.

== History ==
A fellmongery was first established on the site in 1853, by Thomas Blacket Stephens, operating for around 10 years before ceasing operations. A second fellmongery was commenced on the site by Thomas Alford in 1894 which continued operations until the early 1920s. The land was subsequently used for farming before being resumed by the Redland Shire Council in the 1970s for use as parkland.

After the Moreton Bay Penal Settlement was closed in 1839 areas around Moreton Bay were progressively surveyed to be opened up to free settlement. The year 1840 saw the arrival of pastoralists in the Moreton Bay District and by 1844 there were 17 large squatting runs, and by 1849 some 290,000 sheep.

Brisbane and its port thrived because of wool production and the processing of wool operated throughout Brisbane and its surrounds. The early method of sheepwashing in Queensland began to be replaced by woolscouring – the treatment and cleaning of wool after shearing – from the late 1840s and was almost completely replaced by the 1890s.

The process of fellmongering appears in the early 1850s in the Moreton Bay region. A different process to wool scouring, fellmongering processed sheepskins in order to remove the wool in preparation for tanning. The wool was washed and dried, and the skins were processed into leather.

Woolscouring and fellmongering were sometimes located within the same operation, or tended to be clustered in close proximity, along with tanneries. Slaughteryards were also sometimes run in conjunction with fellmongeries. They tended to be located alongside a creek to enable a good supply of clean, fresh water – a key element in the processing of the skins and wool. A number of such operations occurred during the 19th and 20th centuries in Brisbane, including along Bulimba Creek in the vicinity of Carindale and Belmont, at Ekibin on Norman Creek, and Newmarket and Kelvin Grove on Enoggera Creek.

Fellmongery operations commenced at Cleveland relatively early. In 1851 Cleveland was proclaimed as a township, including the area which was later to become known as Ormiston. The allotments along Hilliards Creek were surveyed in 1853 and Thomas Blacket Stephens established a fellmongery shortly afterwards, under the management of Mr Beattie, on sections 100 and 101, Parish of Cleveland. Stephens commenced business at the time when efforts were being made to establish Cleveland Point as the port for Moreton Bay, and he may well have set up his establishment on Hilliards Creek to service the wool trade expected to travel from Ipswich to Cleveland Point. Stephens moved his operations to his property "Ekibin" near South Brisbane in the early 1860s, at about the time when attempts to establish a port at Cleveland ended (Ryan 2005:7). It is not known when the fellmongery at Cleveland ceased operations, and it may have continued until the late 1860s under the management of Andrew Holden, who originally worked at the fellmongery for Stephens. Stephens was a well-known figure in the early colony becoming owner of the Moreton Bay Courier in 1861, and Member of the Queensland Legislative Assembly for South Brisbane in 1863. Between 1867 and 1870 he was colonial treasurer, colonial secretary, postmaster-general, and secretary for public lands in the Lilley and Macalister ministries.

It was some 30 years before the site was again proposed for use as a fellmongery. Thomas Alford obtained a permit from the Cleveland Divisional Board in July 1894 to erect a wool scouring and fellmongering works on allotment 4 of section 100, the site of Stephens' earlier fellmongery. Although situated on the site of Stephens' earlier fellmongery, just a small section of his original holdings were taken up by Alford.

Prior to establishing the fellmongery at Cleveland, Alford had been refused a fellmongery permit by the Bulimba Divisional Board due to its by-laws regarding "noisome and offensive trades". The Bulimba ratepayers were unhappy with this decision and convened a public meeting. They were concerned that Cleveland had welcomed Alford, given him dinner at the Brighton Hotel and granted him the permit, leading to the generation of £70 a week in wages that would be spent in Cleveland and not Bulimba. They demanded that the Bulimba Divisional Board revise their by-laws.

Construction of Alford's establishment commenced in early August 1894 with a full range of fellmongering facilities being established. The building material was brought in by rail and dray and stumps were obtained from the bush. Timber was obtained from Gilbert Burnett's sawmill located on the Fernbourne Estate at Wellington Point (see Whepstead) (BC 1894a). The construction was expected to take six weeks to complete, and included the following:

- Wool shed, 40 by 18 feet (12.2 m × 5.5 m), fronting the road, including eight wool bins, sorting tables and a wool press
- Soaks
- Sweathouse
- Sorting sheds
- Engine shed, including engine, pump and washing machine, supplied by Messrs A. Overend and Co.
- Drying shed, for use in wet weather when drying ground not usable

The fellmongery was supervised by Mr T. Sefton who was experienced in the industry in both England and the colonies; although it appears Alford maintained an active role. Alford approached the Railway Commissioner in late 1894 to request construction of a siding at Ormiston railway station. The Commissioner agreed subject to a range of conditions which Alford chose to decline. Finally deciding to construct the siding at Ormiston in 1895, Alford in the meantime had to cart all the skins and wool from Wellington Point railway station and back again Alford constructed a dam across Hilliards Creek in 1901 in order to improve the control of water, a vital resource for the fellmongery operation.

The fellmongery operation (which also included a wool scour and slaughteryard) operated until the early 1920s. The land was transferred to Jessie Ferguson by 1932, followed by George McLeod Ferguson in 1951. Allotment 4 was subdivided into Lots 1 and 2 in 1969, and the lots resumed by the Redland Shire Council for park and recreation purposes in 1970 and 1975 respectively. The site appears not to have been used for any further industry or development, with Fellmonger Park now being at the location of the site.

== Description ==
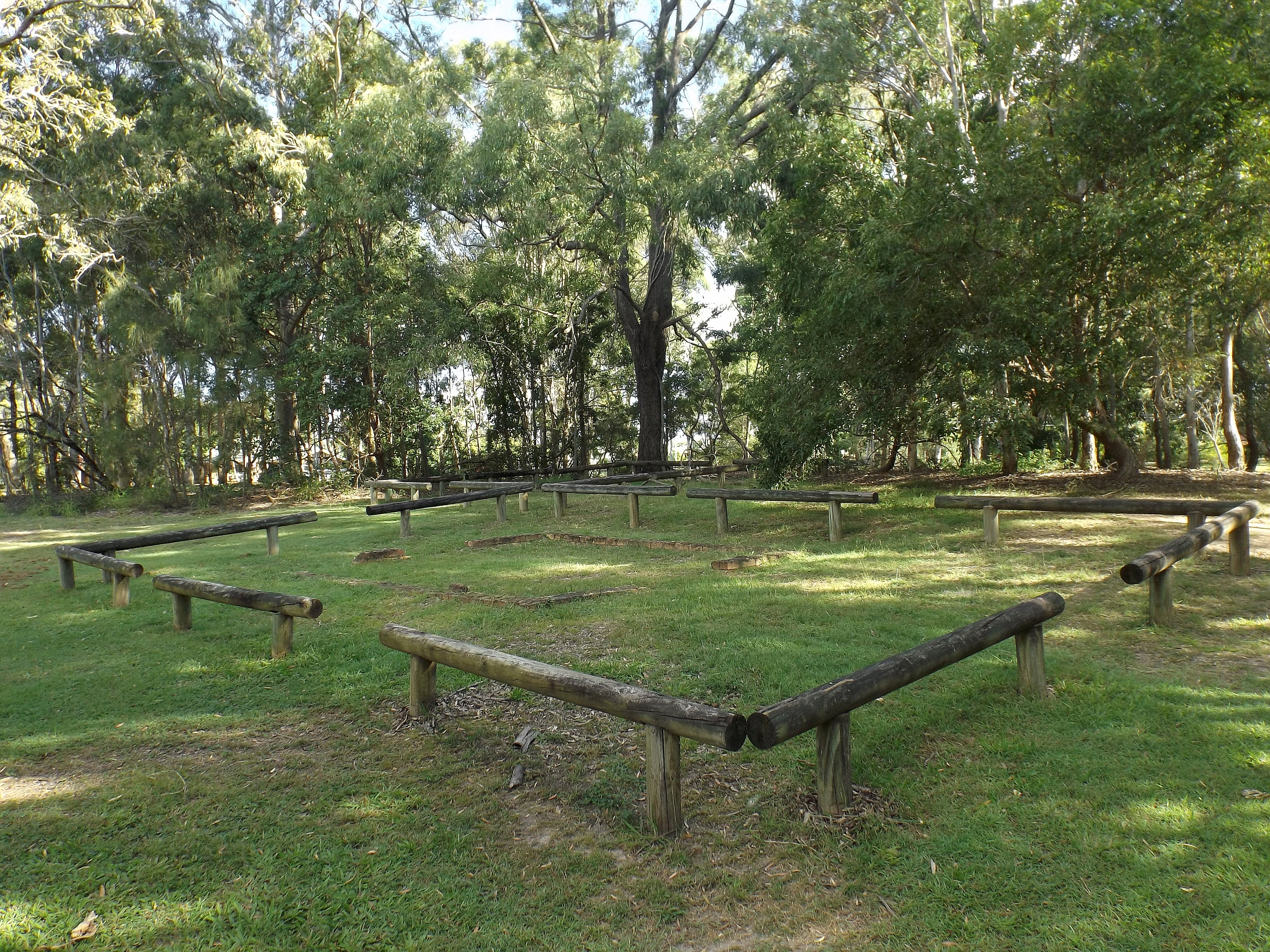
Fenced area in Orminston Park, 2015

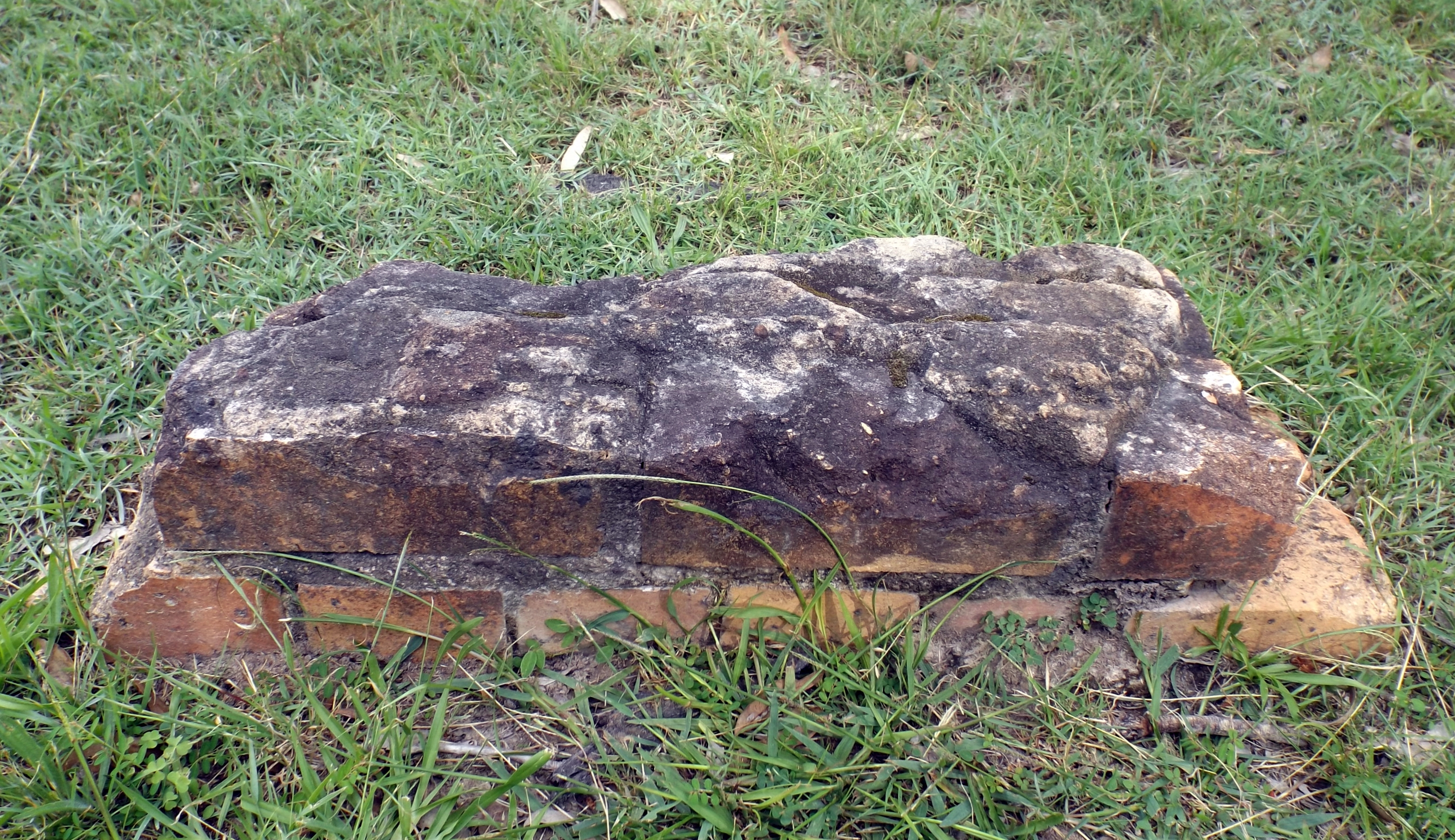
Brick foundation in 2015

The site is situated in Fellmonger Park, which consists of mown grassed areas, and an undulating land surface with several mounded areas with mulched tree plantings on top. The land drops to low-lying flats towards Hilliards Creek which become flooded after heavy and prolonged rain. The park's vegetation includes eucalypts, cassia and other species in planted gardens and as isolated specimens. Melaleuca (ti-tree) occur along the creek banks and on the creek flats.

The obvious physical remains of the fellmongery are surrounded by low treated log fencing. There are two fenced areas. The first contains brick foundations 5.05 by 4.15 metres (16.6 ft × 13.6 ft) with an opening at either end. The foundations are two bricks high above the ground surface in an English Bond pattern. One of the bricks displays a frog with "Campbells Redbank". The foundation continues below the ground surface. A compacted layer, possibly a floor, occurs at approximately 50 centimetres (20 in) below the surface. The foundations are situated on the side of a mounded area about 15 metres (49 ft) from the creek.

The second fenced area is diagonally adjacent to the first. It is grassed on the surface with no obvious surface remains. A subsurface deposit of bricks and brick fragments approximately 5 centimetres (2.0 in) below the surface was revealed through test probing. The deposit appears to occur across the entire fenced area. This deposit occurs at the top of the mounded area.

The remainder of the top of the mounded area consists of leaf litter and mulch and tree species including eucalypts and cassia trees. The mulched area on the top of the mound is likely to conceal further archaeological remains.

A causeway across the creek which forms part of the modern bike/walking track is situated to the west of the brick foundations. The lower levels of the causeway consist of rough stone and rubble and appear of an early construction. The stone has been subsequently overlaid with concrete and bitumen.

== Heritage listing ==
Ormiston Fellmongery was listed on the Queensland Heritage Register on 18 September 2009 having satisfied the following criteria.

The remains of the Ormiston Fellmongery are important in demonstrating the pattern of Queensland's history as remnant evidence of the important secondary industry of wool processing. Physical evidence of wool scouring, fellmongering and tanning is today rare, despite the importance of the wool industry and the processing of wool to Queensland's history. The processing of wool was commonly undertaken in and around Brisbane in locations conveniently situated to fresh water sources and transport networks yet the remains of the Ormiston Fellmongery are the only known surviving elements in the region.

Archaeological evidence of a fellmongery which spanned two time periods at the one location (the 1850s to 1860s and then again between 1894 and the 1920s) provide rare and potentially important comparative information about fellmongery practice in Queensland, including change through time.

The extant structural remains and adjacent subsurface deposits are most likely related to the second phase of operations from 1894 to the 1920s and have the potential to reveal important information about the organisation and layout of a fellmongery operation from this period. The analysis of this archaeological evidence may also provide an insight into the broader trade networks of the region through the presence of materials from other parts of south-east Queensland and further afield.

Additional subsurface archaeological deposits and features may potentially occur across the site, including evidence of the earlier fellmongery operations between the 1850s and 1860s. This period of operations is associated with Thomas Blacket Stephens, an important identity in Queensland's history and former owner of the Moreton Bay Courier and later the second mayor of Brisbane. Stephens was well known for his radical politics and social and moral views that often ran in opposition to popular thinking at the time. Archaeological evidence of his early fellmongery operations may reveal important insights into how Stephens' non-populist views were expressed in the material cultural associated with his work and particularly his fellmongery practices.

The remains of an early causeway across Hilliards Creek are likely to be associated with operations at the fellmongery due to its close proximity and the requirement to access rail transport at Wellington Point on the north side of the creek prior to 1895. Archaeological investigation of the causeway has the potential to provide information on early road construction techniques and may provide more accurate dating of the age of its construction.
