= John Cameron (Queensland politician, born 1834) =

Australian politician

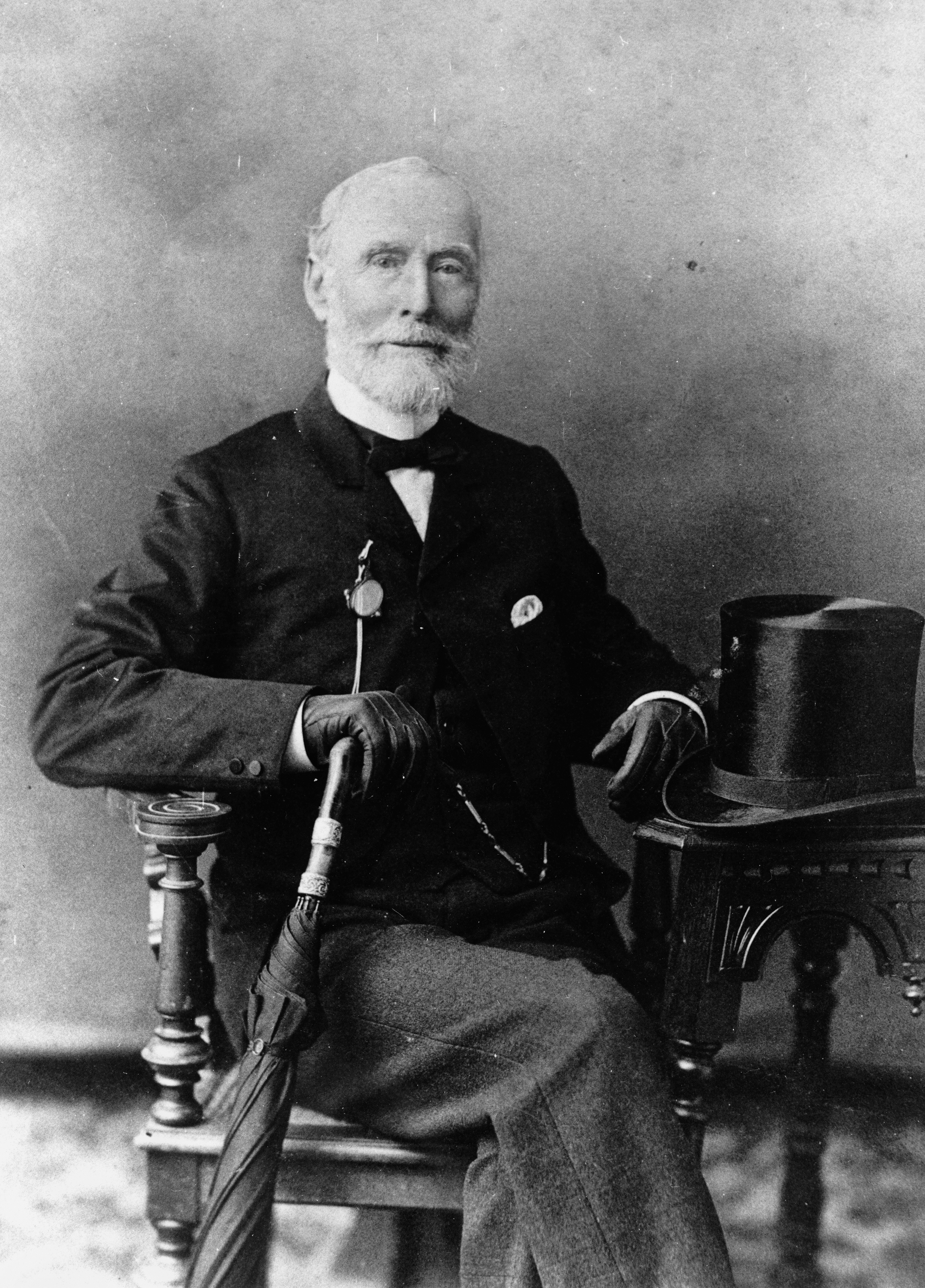
John Cameron, founder of Cameron Brothers

John Cameron (19 October 1834 – 24 March 1902) was a Queensland politician, author, and public figure. A pioneering Brisbane auctioneer, realtor, and principal of Cameron Bros, John Cameron is a key early Queensland public figure and one of the builders of Brisbane.

== Early history ==
Born in Launceston, the son of actors and pioneers of the Australian stage, Samson Cameron and Cordelia Bouchier, John was the eldest of nine children. Cameron moved to Victoria, where he married Frances Spencer Hanger in 1860. Together they produced eight children (five boys, three girls) during the 1860s and 1870s.

== Brisbane Real Estate and Cameron Bros ==
John Cameron arrived in Brisbane, on 8 March 1861, and soon began work as a livestock auctioneer with A Twyman Auctioneering. By the end of July that year, John Cameron had formed an auctioneering partnership with Charles Trundle. This partnership was dissolved in 1864, and Cameron began the real estate firm that would come to be known as Brisbane icon, Cameron Bros. Cameron introduced into Queensland the concept of subdividing large blocks of land into smaller allotments. He was involved in the creation of Brisbane's first estate, the Waverley Estate in Boggo Road.

Cameron's association with infamous Brisbane butcher, Patrick Mayne, began early in his career. Both were nominated as aldermen in 1865, with Mayne being elected to office. Later, Mayne's youngest children employed Cameron Bros to manage the heritage-listed Brisbane Arcade on their behalf.

John Cameron did become an alderman, for the South Brisbane ward, but declined further offers to stand for parliament due to the demands of his business.

== Historic Moreton Bay property ==
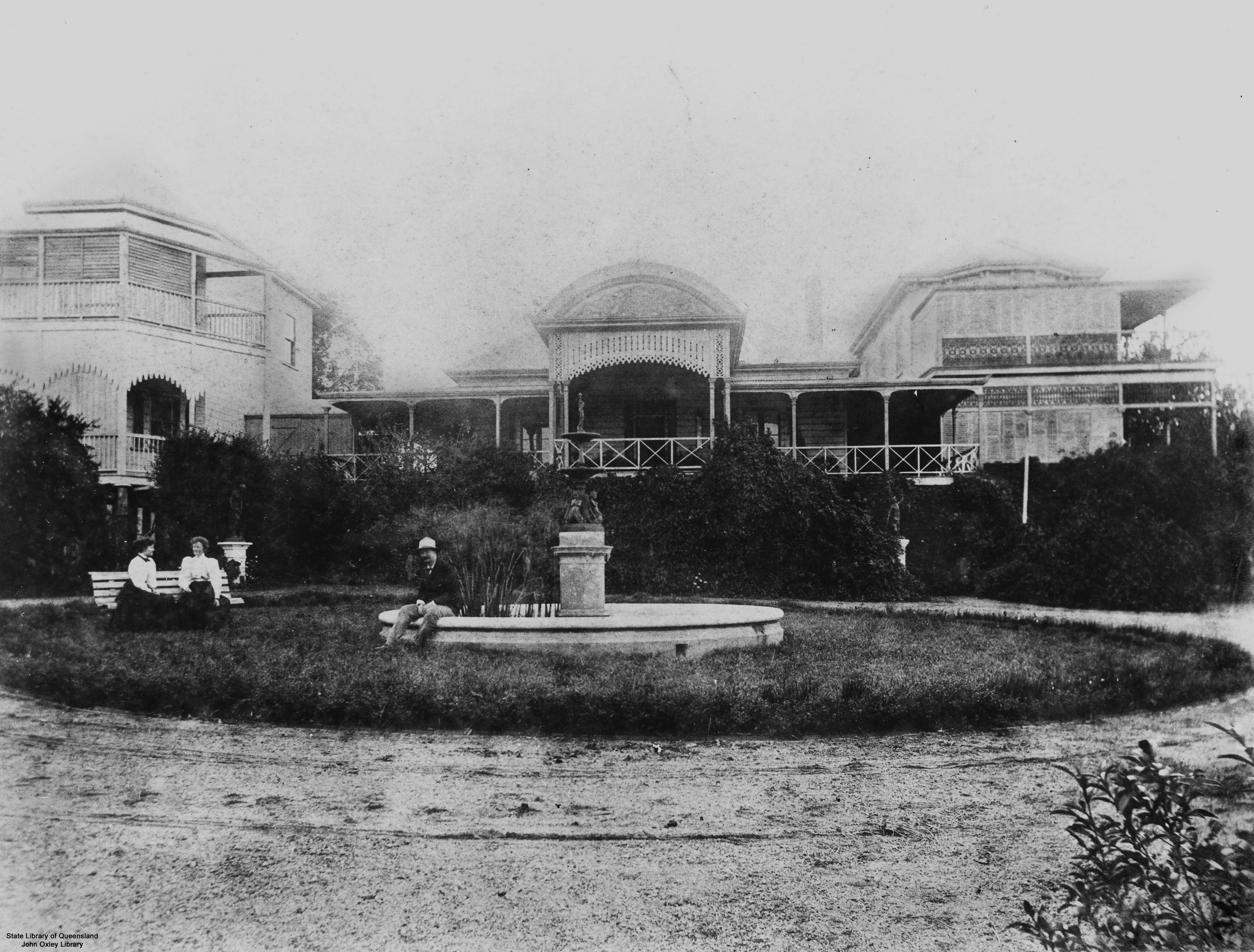
Doobawah, circa 1900

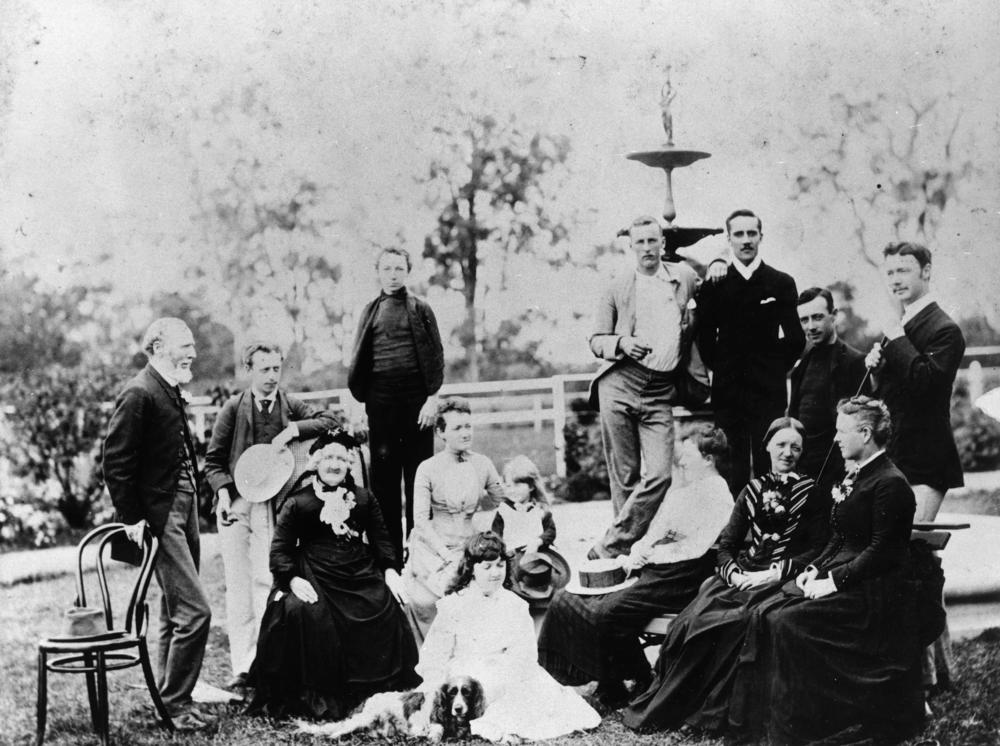
John Cameron and family with friends at Doobawah, circa 1888

In 1884, Cameron built the iconic Doobawah on a 10-acre parcel of Ormiston land adjacent to Moreton Bay and Raby Bay (now located at 26 Empire Vista), with a view to a retirement spent fishing. Doobawah, the Aboriginal name for Raby Bay, also meant "a vast expanse of water". The property, a former cane plantation, was bounded by Wellington and Eckersley Streets, and fringed by Moreton Bay to the east. Large wings were added to the house, and land to the property, about a year later.

== Cameron's published work ==
In 1888, John Cameron wrote "The Fisherman: a guide to the inexperienced: how when and where to catch fish" while living at Doobawah. This was reportedly the first book written in Australia devoted to saltwater fishing.

Cameron also wrote "The fire stick: incidents in the shearers' strike: a tale of Australian bush life" under the pseudonym Wulla Merrii (published 1893). He was a prolific correspondent to local publications in his later years.

== Later years ==
Cameron died on 24 March 1902 at Doobawah, and is buried in the Toowong Cemetery. The Doobawah homestead was broken up and his sons moved the two wings. One wing went to the Holyrood Hospital on Gregory Terrace (later the Country Women's Hostel) and the other became part of St John's College in Kangaroo Point. Doobawah was subsequently sold to the Pike brothers, who used the property site as a poultry farm. In 1993, the remaining section of Doobawah was moved 200 metres from its original position in Eckersley St. It is now surrounded by the Empire Point residential estate.

Cameron's legacy to the development of Southeast Queensland can be found in the pages of the Cameron Bros journals: a large proportion of Brisbane's property has passed through the family's hands since 1864. Perusal of the Cameron Bros ledgers, now held at the University of Queensland's Fryer Library, reveals a realtor's history of a growing state.
