= Ormiston House Estate =

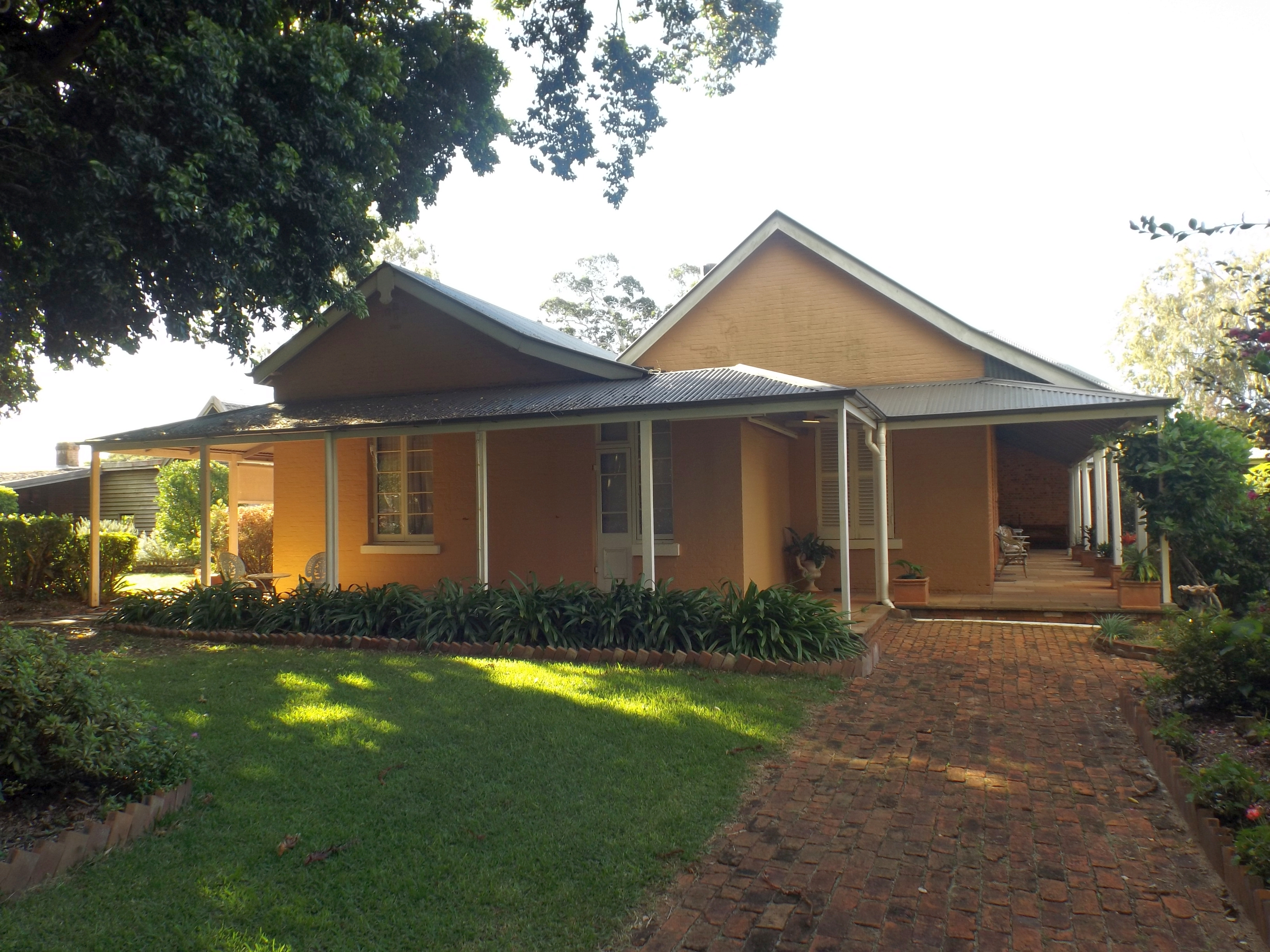
- Building in 2015

- Location within Queensland Location within Australia
- 27.4966°S 153.2579°E
- Location: Wellington Street, Ormiston, City of Redland, Queensland, Australia

History
- Design period: 1840s–1860s (mid-19th century)
- Built: c. 1858–c. 1865

Queensland Heritage Register
- Official name: Ormiston House Estate
- Type: state heritage (built)
- Designated: 21 October 1992
- Reference no.: 600775
- Significant period: 1850s–1860s (fabric) c. 1858–1880s, 1935, 1959 (historical)
- Significant components: tree groups – avenue of, store/s / storeroom / storehouse, garden/grounds, cairn, plantings – exotic, kitchen/kitchen house, laundry / wash house, residential accommodation – main house, objects (movable) – farming, residential accommodation – gatehouse/lodge

Ormiston House Estate is a heritage-listed plantation at Wellington Street, Ormiston, City of Redland, Queensland, Australia. It was built from c. 1858 to c. 1865. It was added to the Queensland Heritage Register on 21 October 1992.

== History ==
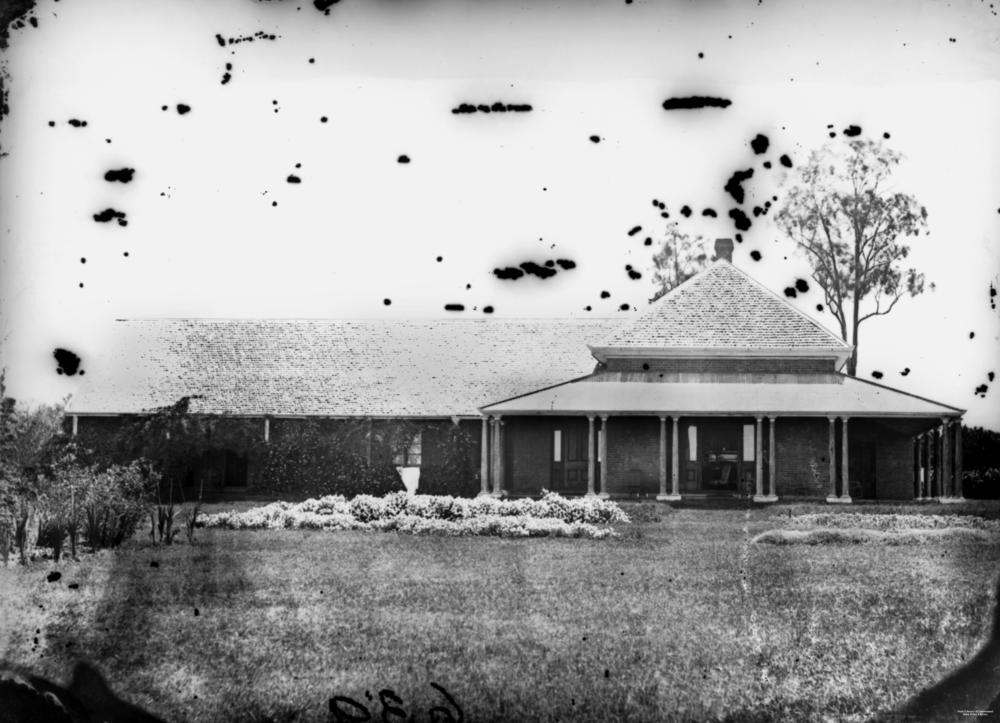
Captain Louis Hope's residence, Ormiston House, Cleveland district, circa 1871

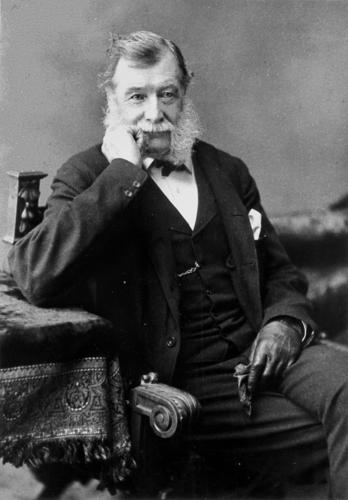
Captain Louis Hope

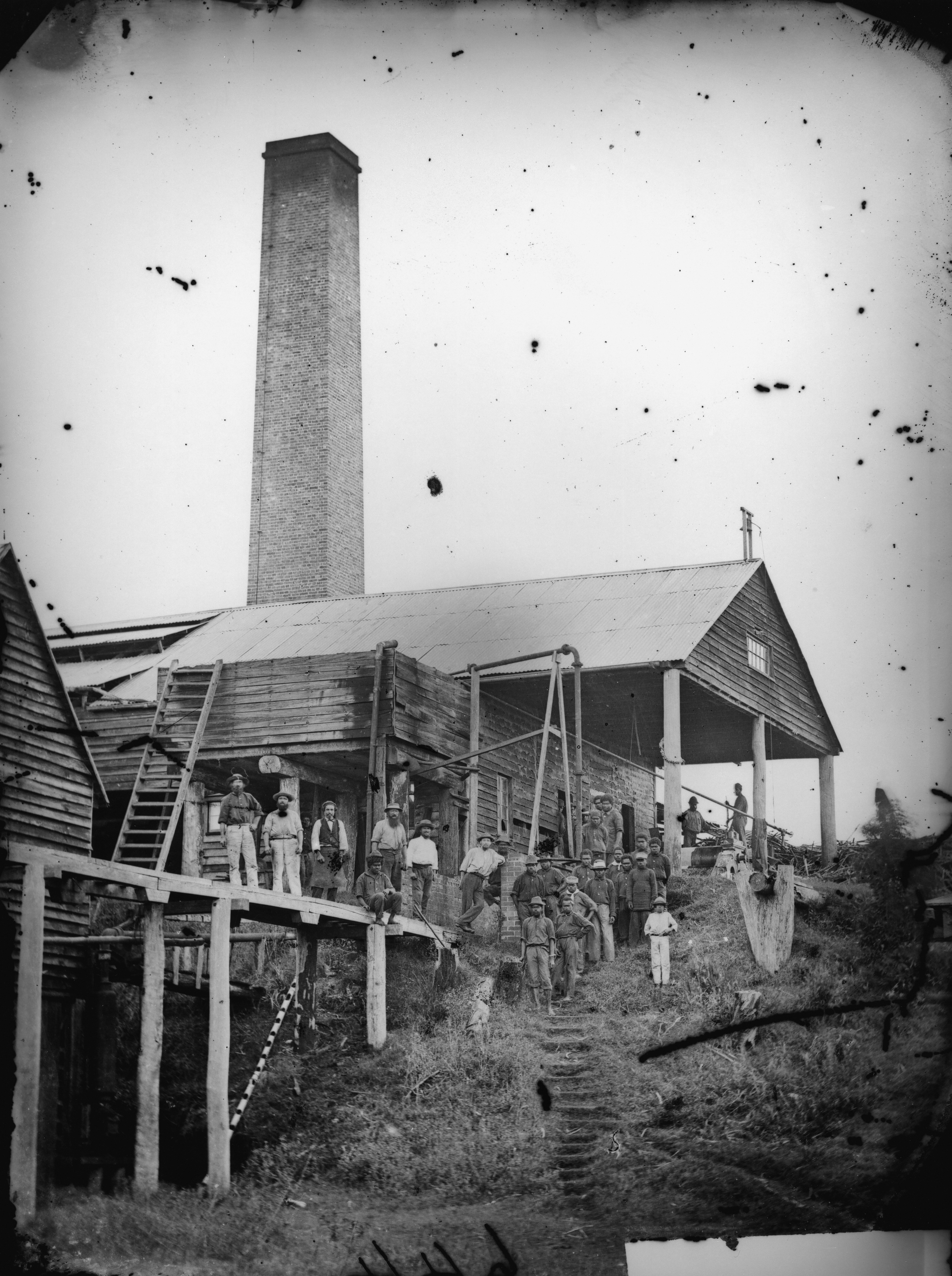
Ormiston Sugar Mill, circa 1871

Ormiston House, a large, single-storeyed brick residence, was erected in stages between c.1858 and 1865 for the Hon. Louis Hope, a Member of the Queensland Legislative Council.

Hope had arrived in New South Wales in 1843, was an active participant in early Queensland economic and political life, and was instrumental in the development of the sugar industry in Queensland. In the 1850s he purchased and/or leased extensive landholdings in the Moreton region, including Kilcoy Station (in partnership with Robert Ramsey) in 1853, Shafston House at Kangaroo Point in 1854, and land in the Cleveland area overlooking Raby Bay, 1852–55.

Ormiston, said to have been named after a Hope ancestral name in Scotland, was farmed from c. 1858, and the slab hut which is now the kitchen wing at Ormiston House appears to date from this period. In the early 1860s Hope experimented first with cotton, then sugar cane.

By late 1862 the estate comprised just under 325 hectares (800 acres) of fenced land. Improvements included an established ornamental garden, 8 hectares (20 acres) under sugarcane, 5.25 hectares (13.0 acres) under corn, saltpans producing up to 4 metric tons (3.9 long tons; 4.4 short tons) of salt per day, a small brick house, a slab hut containing a kitchen, oven and two small rooms, huts for the farm workers, an overseer's house, a barn, stockyard and milking yards. Water was obtained from wells and waterholes on the property. In 1863 Hope acquired extensive adjacent lands from Post-Master General Thomas Lodge Murray-Prior.

In 1864 Hope erected Queensland's first sugar crushing mill, supplied by Cook & Co. of Glasgow, on the banks of Hilliards Creek. The first commercially milled sugar in Queensland was produced there in September that year.

Accompanying the establishment of his sugar plantation and mill, Hope erected on the property a substantial brick residence in 1864–65. The earlier small brick house appears to have been incorporated into the new structure, which featured gas lighting (probably a by-product of sugar manufacture), hot water and cisterns. Reputedly, Hope brought out Scottish workmen to erect the house, and sent cypress pine logs from Ormiston to England to be turned for the tuscan columns along the verandahs. The bricks were made on the property, and the timber was felled and sawn on site. The roof was shingled originally.

In 1865 the sugar plantation at Ormiston was the largest in Queensland. From September 1867 Hope was employing South Pacific islanders in his canefields, and producing 50-60 long tons (61 t) of sugar in a season. Most of this went directly to the station trade rather than to merchants in Brisbane. In 1869 the mill and a distillery were in active operation, with Hope both buying cane from smaller growers and operating the plant as a central crushing mill on the half-produce principle.

Hope continued with sugar crushing at Ormiston until c. 1875 when, following protracted litigation with a neighbour who claimed that Hope had reneged on a promise to crush his cane, the mill machinery was sold. In the same year he leased the bulk of the property west of Hilliards Creek to his former manager Gilbert Burnett, retaining about 80 hectares (200 acres) with the main residence.

In mid-1881 Hope advertised Ormiston House for sale in anticipation of leaving the colony. The house was described as a large brick and stone residence of sixteen rooms, with wide verandahs to three sides, a detached kitchen, servants' quarters, and laundry. A lead-lined cedar tank in the roof supplied water for baths and three cisterns. The house and a four-roomed brick lodge sat in 3.25 hectares (8.0 acres) of ornamental gardens. Ormiston House was not sold at the time, but Burnett purchased from Hope the property he had been leasing since 1875.

In 1882 the Hope family returned to England, leaving Kilcoy and Ormiston under the supervision of manager William Butler, who leased out Ormiston House. Hope died in 1894, but Ormiston House remained in the family until 1912, when it was sold to grazier John Arthur Macartney of Waverley Station.

In 1935 the International Society of Sugar Technologists erected a cairn in the front grounds of Ormiston House to commemorate Hope's pioneering work in the Queensland sugar industry.

In 1959 the house on just under 11 hectares (27 acres) was acquired by the Carmelite Nuns, and subsequently a brick monastery was built in the grounds. With their permission, Ormiston House now functions as a house museum, operated by the Ormiston House Restoration Association, established in the mid-1960s.

== Description ==
Ormiston House Estate consists of a complex of buildings including the main house, a slab kitchen, former store, laundry, lodge and extensive grounds. A large monastery was built to the north. The property overlooks Raby Bay to the east, with the grounds extending to the water's edge with terracing to mangrove wetlands along the foreshore.

The single-storeyed brick house has a T-shaped plan form, encircled by verandahs, and two small rooms on the northwest. The building has a hipped corrugated iron roof, with the south section having two parallel hips with south gables and lower unlined skillion roofs to the verandahs.

Built in stages, the earliest southeast section is of Flemish bond face brick with the later stages, a north wing and western addition, being of English bond face brick. The south wall is painted.

The eastern verandah has brick paving, but elsewhere the verandahs now have sandstone paving. The north wing verandahs have paired, white painted timber, tuscan columns with stone bases; those to the southern wing have square chamfered timber posts with curved timber brackets at the corners and are partially lattice screened to the west.

The northern wing has French doors with large fanlights and timber shutters. The southern wing has casement windows and timber doors with glass panels. The entry hall, in the junction between the two wings, has a panelled cedar door with clear glass fanlight and sidelights at either end.

Internally, the entry hall walls are rendered, and walls elsewhere are rendered and papered, mostly to picture rail height. The principal rooms have ceilings 5 metres (16 ft) high. Most rooms have pressed metal ceilings, with the entry hall ceiling raking down above the west entry door with the fanlight cut into the rake.

The floors are timber and joinery throughout is of cedar with deep skirtings, wide architraves and sills, panelled doors, fireplace surrounds, French doors and casement windows. The water closet contains an early flushing cistern, and gas piping for the light fittings. The present kitchen has pressed metal sheets to the walls with wall mounted gas light fittings.

The split-log slab kitchen, sitting on large timber sleepers, has a corrugated iron gable roof and is situated to the west of the house. It has a brick paved east verandah with a lower pitch roof. Internally, the building has a boarded ceiling, casement windows and the original brick chimney and kitchen oven at the north end.

The former store, now containing toilets, is built of brick and is located to the north of the slab kitchen. The building shares the same roof and verandah as the kitchen.

A single skin timber laundry, attached to the western side of the slab kitchen, has a corrugated iron skillion roof and is open to the north. The laundry has a copper, a brick chimney and an attached timber lean- to the south.

A white painted brick lodge with a steep, corrugated iron gable roof is located to the south. The building has enclosed north and southwest verandahs, a west porch with a gable roof and casement windows.

The grounds include an avenue of Bunya Pines to the southeast, mature exotic trees between the house and the road, large areas of lawn and other remnants of earlier plantings.

To the east stands a 1935 memorial cairn.

A two-storeyed brick monastery lies to the north of the main house, and they are separated by a high fence.

== Heritage listing ==
Ormiston House Estate was listed on the Queensland Heritage Register on 21 October 1992 having satisfied the following criteria.

The place is important in demonstrating the evolution or pattern of Queensland's history.

Ormiston House Estate, established in the late 1850s to early 1860s, is important in demonstrating the evolution and pattern of Queensland's history, being closely associated with the establishment of European settlement at Cleveland and with the establishment of the sugar industry in Queensland.

The place demonstrates rare, uncommon or endangered aspects of Queensland's cultural heritage.

Ormiston House demonstrates a rare aspect of Queensland's history, providing evidence of early and uncommon gas, hot water and water closet facilities.

The place has potential to yield information that will contribute to an understanding of Queensland's history.

Ormiston House Estate has potential to yield information that will contribute to an understanding of Queensland's history, containing the site of early agricultural and industrial activity and extensive 19th century gardens.

The place is important in demonstrating the principal characteristics of a particular class of cultural places.

The place is important in demonstrating the principle characteristics of an 1860s country house and rural estate, and house and grounds make a strong aesthetic contribution to the Ormiston district and to the Raby Bay foreshore, which is valued by the community.

The place is important because of its aesthetic significance.

The place is important in demonstrating the principle characteristics of an 1860s country house and rural estate, and house and grounds make a strong aesthetic contribution to the Ormiston district and to the Raby Bay foreshore, which is valued by the community.

The place has a special association with the life or work of a particular person, group or organisation of importance in Queensland's history.

Ormiston House Estate has a special association with the life and work of Queensland pioneer Hon. Louis Hope, and his contribution to the development of the sugar industry in Queensland.
