= Wellington Point railway station =

Railway station in Queensland, Australia

Wellington Point
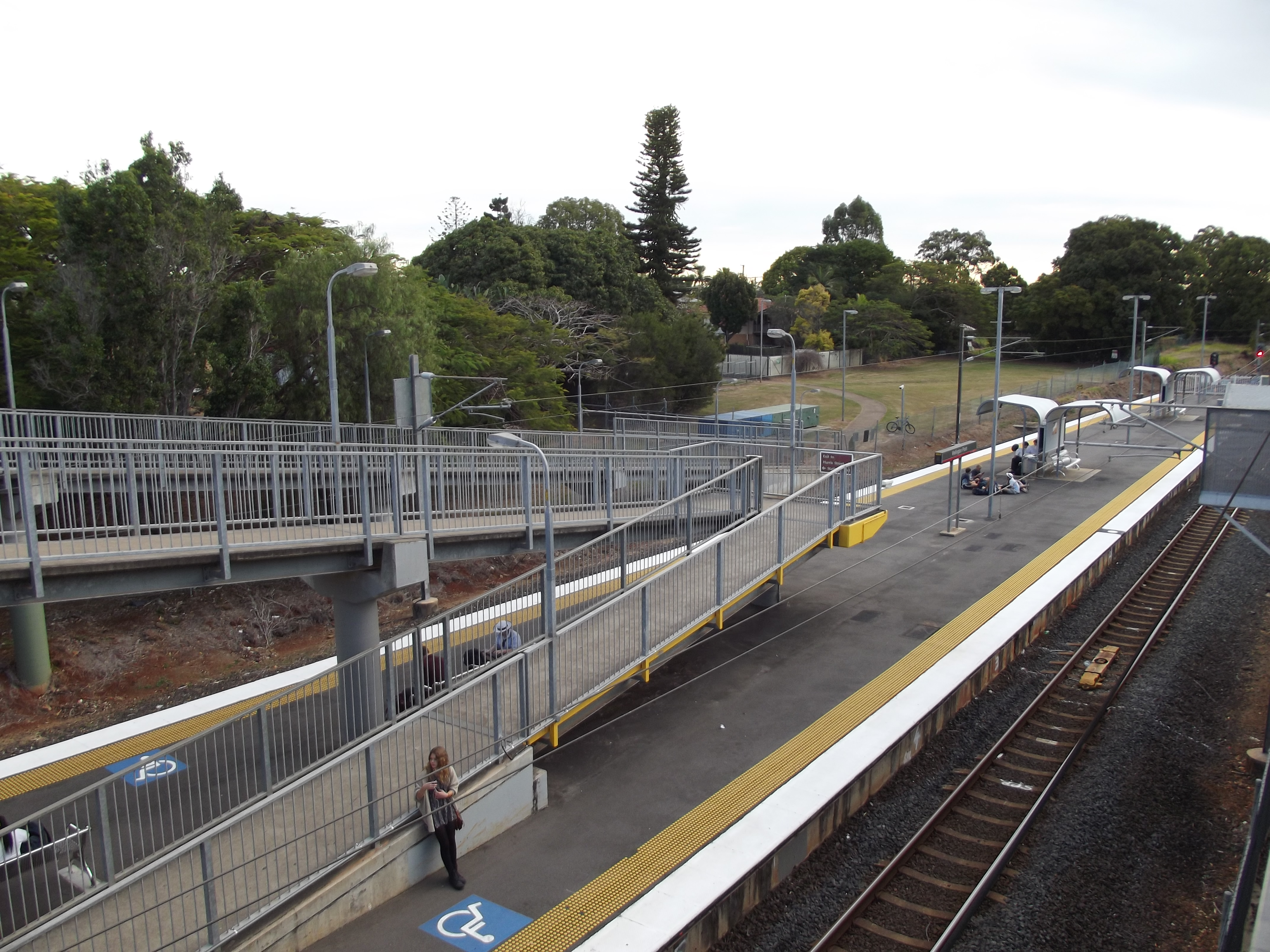
- Westbound view of Platform 2, August 2012

General information
- Location: Station Street, Wellington Point
- Coordinates: 27°29′40″S 153°14′31″E
- Owner: Queensland Rail
- Operator: Queensland Rail
- Line: Cleveland
- Distance: 32.88 kilometres from Central
- Platforms: 2 (1 island)
- Tracks: 2

Construction
- Structure type: Ground
- Parking: 191 bays
- Cycle facilities: Yes
- Accessible: Assisted

Other information
- Station code: 600275 (platform 1); 600274 (platform 2)
- Fare zone: Zone 2/3
- Website: Translink

History
- Opened: 1889
- Rebuilt: 1986

Services
Preceding station	Queensland Rail	Following station
Birkdale towards Shorncliffe via Roma Street	Cleveland line	Ormiston towards Cleveland
Location

Wellington Point is a railway station operated by Queensland Rail on the Cleveland line. It opened in 1889 and serves the Redlands suburb of Wellington Point. It is a ground level station, featuring one island platform with two faces.

== History ==
In 1889, the Cleveland line was extended from Manly to the original Cleveland station.

Wellington Point station opened in 1889 at the same time as the line. On 1 November 1960, the station closed when the line was truncated to Lota. The station reopened on 26 July 1986, and served as an interim terminus as the line was being rebuilt to Cleveland.

== Services ==
Wellington Point is served by Cleveland line services from Shorncliffe, Northgate, Doomben and Bowen Hills to Cleveland.

== Platforms and services ==
Wellington Point platform arrangement
Platform	Line	Destination	Notes
1	Cleveland	Cleveland	
2	Cleveland	Roma Street (to Shorncliffe line)	
