= Louis Hope =

Australian politician

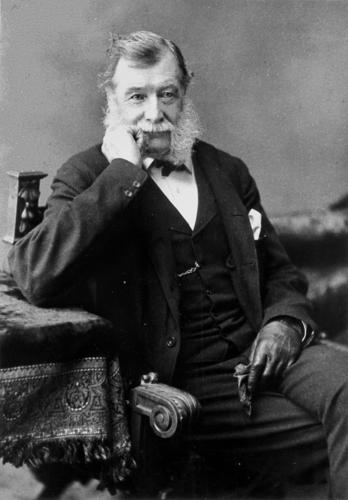

Member of the Queensland Legislative Council
- In office 24 April 1862 – 1 November 1882

Personal details
- Born: Louis Hope; 19 October 1817 Linlithgow, Scotland
- Died: 15 August 1894 (aged 76) Geneva, Switzerland
- Spouse: Susan Frances Sophia Dumaresq (m.1859 d.1901)
- Relations: John Hope, 4th Earl of Hopetoun (father), William Dumaresq (father-in-law)
- Occupation: Pastoralist

Louis Hope (19 October 1817 – 15 August 1894) was a Member of the Queensland Legislative Council.

== Early years ==
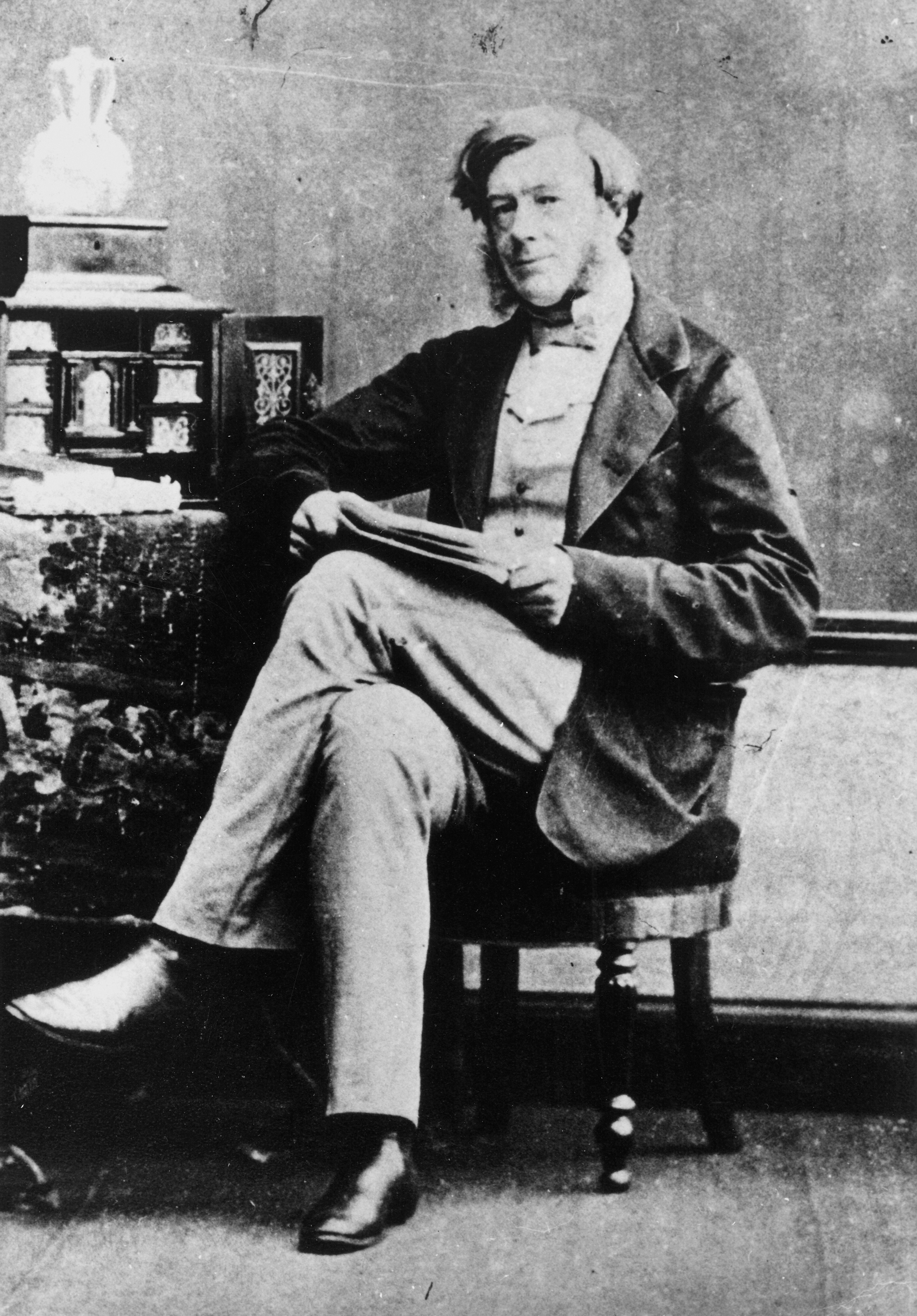
Captain Louis Hope, at a younger age

Hope was born in Linlithgow, Scotland in 1817 to General John Hope, 4th Earl of Hopetoun, and his wife Louisa Dorothea (née Wedderburn). After finishing his education he joined the Coldstream Guards, rising to the rank of Captain.

In 1843 he arrived in New South Wales. Hope moved to Moreton Bay in 1848 and purchased land at Ormiston in 1853 where he established his Ormiston House Estate. In 1854 he purchased land which eventually equaled 364 housing lots at Norman Park. That same year, along with Robert Ramsay, he took up Kilcoy Station, eventually becoming its sole owner in 1863.

Hope applied Melenesian labour to his twenty acres of sugar cane at Ormiston, and later on his farm near the Coomera River, which labourers had been recruited through the practice known as Blackbirding. Hope was also involved in Sugar mills, opening a mill at Ormiston.

== Politics ==
Hope was appointed to the Queensland Legislative Council on 24 April 1862. He served for twenty years until he resigned on 1 November 1882 to return to Scotland.

== Personal life ==
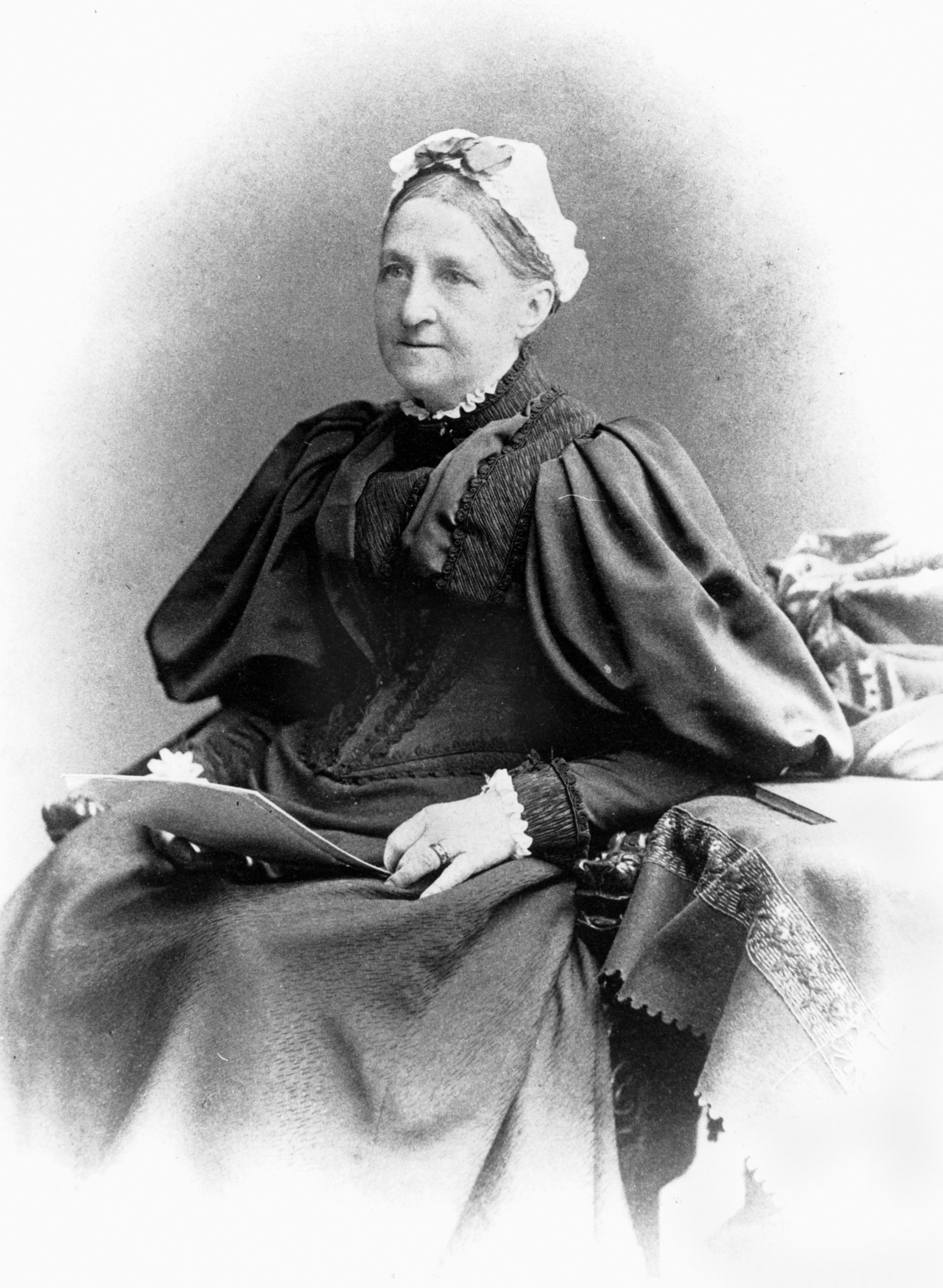
Mrs Susan Frances Sophia Hope, Ormiston House

Hope married Susan Frances Sophia Dumaresq, daughter of William Dumeresq, in Sydney in 1859 and together they had 8 children. He returned to England to live in Hazlewood, Derbyshire and died in Geneva, Switzerland in 1894.

== Legacy ==
His Ormiston House Estate and its St Andrew's Church are both heritage-listed. The grounds of Ormiston House have a cairn commemorating Louis Hope's contribution to the sugar industry.
