= Ormiston railway station =

Railway station in Queensland, Australia

Ormiston
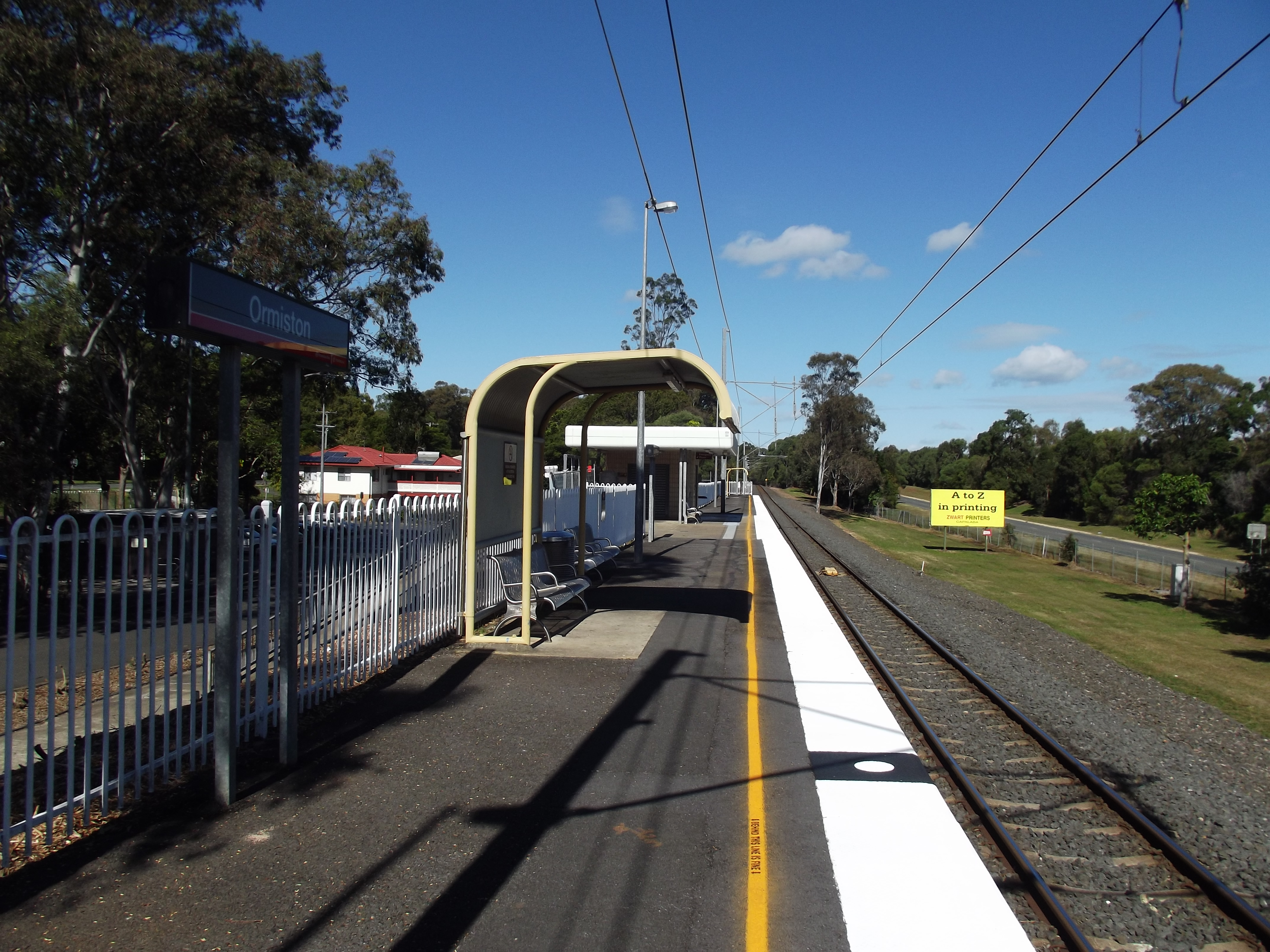
- Eastbound view from the station platform, July 2012

General information
- Location: Wellington Street, Ormiston
- Coordinates: 27°30′53″S 153°15′21″E
- Owner: Queensland Rail
- Operator: Queensland Rail
- Line: Cleveland
- Distance: 35.61 kilometres from Central
- Platforms: 1
- Tracks: 1

Construction
- Structure type: Ground
- Parking: 179 bays
- Cycle facilities: Yes
- Accessible: Assisted

Other information
- Station code: 600276
- Fare zone: Zone 3
- Website: Queensland Rail

History
- Opened: 1889
- Rebuilt: 1987

Services
Preceding station	Queensland Rail	Following station
Wellington Point towards Shorncliffe via Roma Street	Cleveland line	Cleveland Terminus
Location

Ormiston is a railway station operated by Queensland Rail on the Cleveland line. It opened in 1889 and serves the Redlands suburb of Ormiston. It is a ground level station, featuring one side platform.

== History ==
In 1889, the Cleveland line was extended from Manly to the original Cleveland station.

Ormiston station opened in 1889 at the same time as the line. On 1 November 1960, the station closed when the line was truncated to Lota. The station reopened on 24 October 1987 at the same time as the rebuilt line from Wellington Point to Cleveland.

== Services ==
Ormiston is served by Cleveland line services from Shorncliffe, Northgate, Doomben and Bowen Hills to Cleveland.

== Platforms and services ==
Ormiston platform arrangement
Platform	Line	Destination	Notes
1	Cleveland	Cleveland, Roma Street (to Shorncliffe line)	
