= Raby Bay =

Coordinates: 27.5122°S 153.2749°E

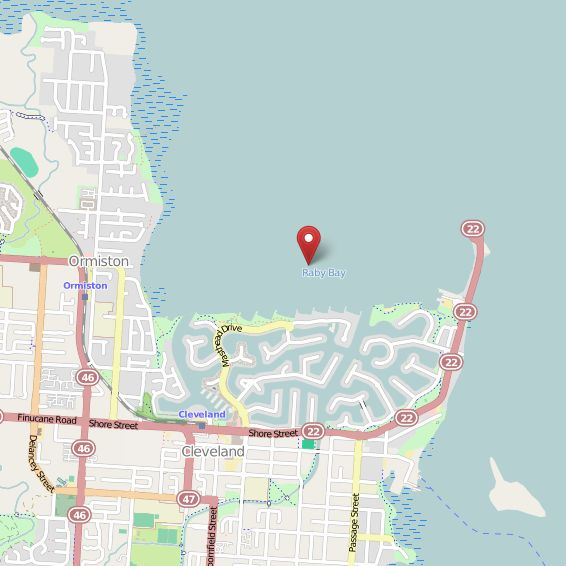
OpenStreetMap - Raby Bay, 2015

Raby Bay is a bay within Moreton Bay, Queensland, Australia, created by the Cleveland Point headland. It forms the coastline of the suburbs of Cleveland and Ormiston in the City of Redland. It is the site of seagrass meadows that support a population of dugongs. Raby Bay is also the name of a neighbourhood (a canal estate development) within Cleveland that borders the bay.

== History ==
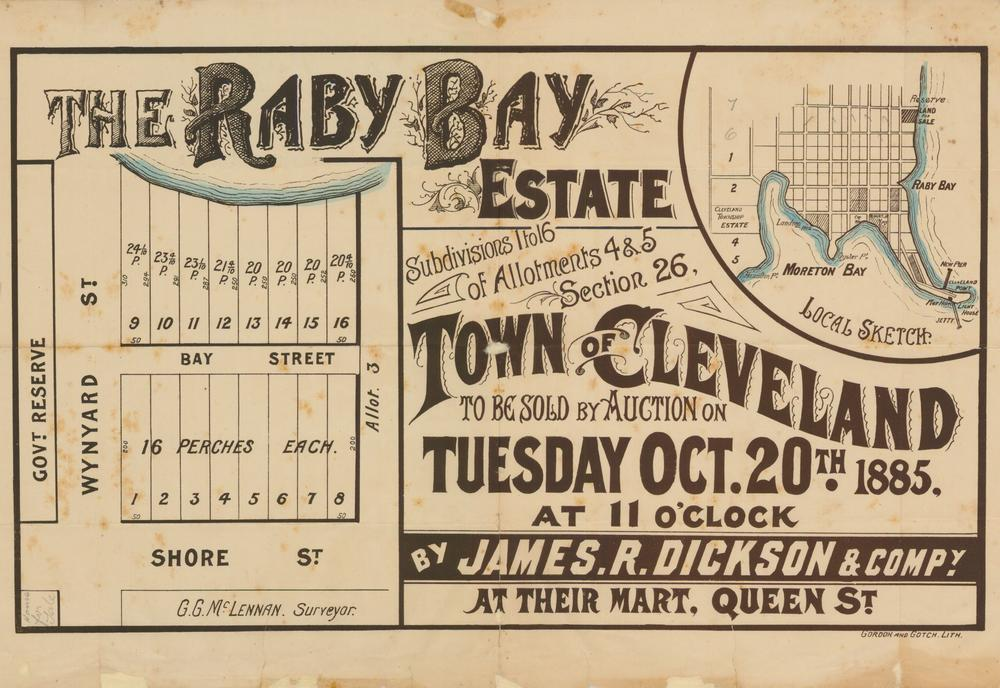
Estate map of Raby Bay Estate, 1885

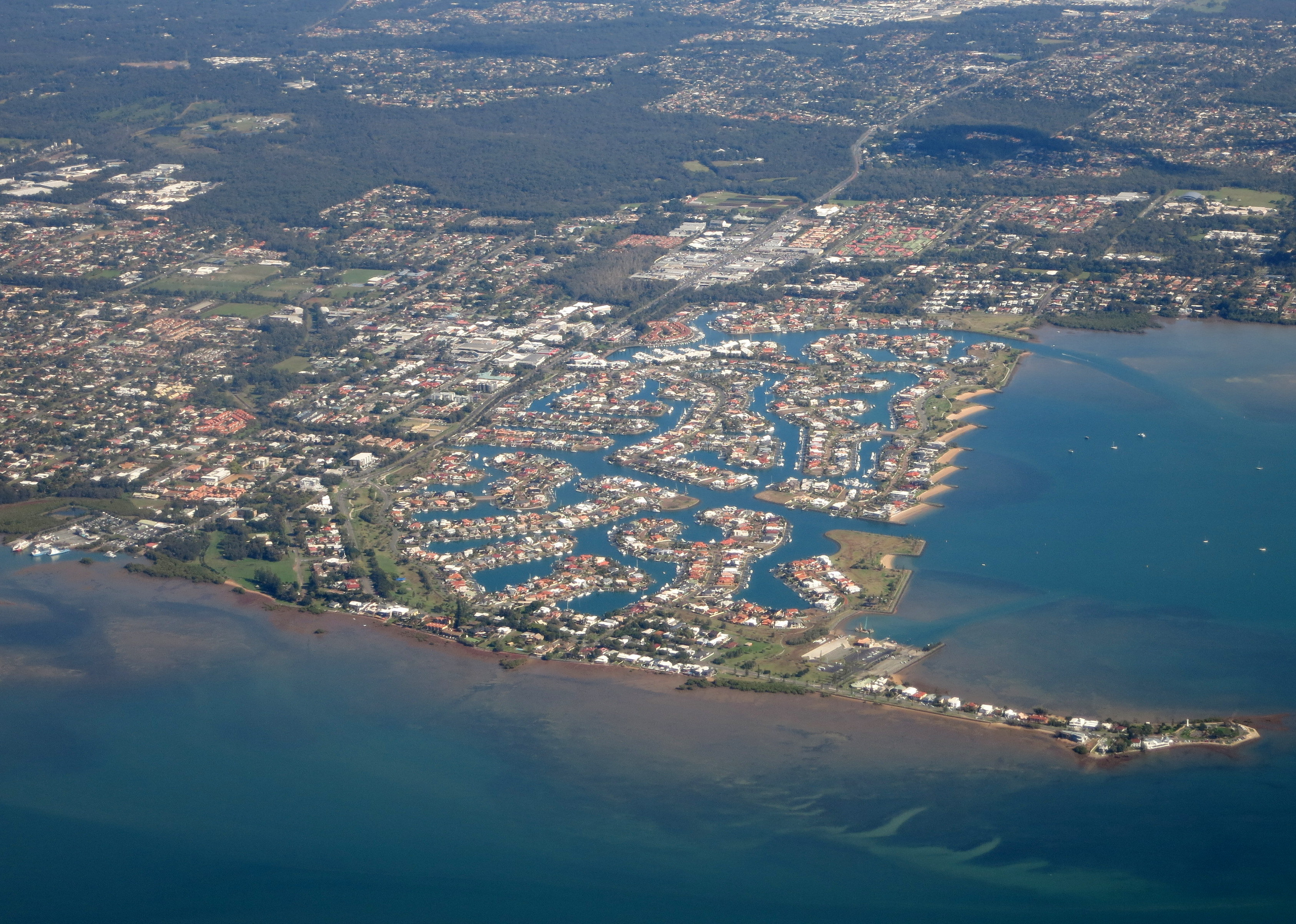
Aerial photography of the Raby Bay canal estate, 2015

The bay was named by the surveyor James Warner on 1 July 1841, after the Duke of Cleveland who was also known as Baron Raby.

In 1864 Queensland's first lighthouse was constructed on Cleveland Point. Now heritage-listed, the Cleveland Point Light remained in use until 1974.

In October 1885, there was a land sale to the south of Raby Bay known as the Raby Bay Estate. 16 subdivided allotments were auctioned by James R. Dickson & Company.

In June 1979 the Queensland Government approved a canal estate development in Raby Bay which would expand the suburb of Cleveland into the bay using land reclamation to create waterfront building sites for prestige residential and commercial purposes with canal access to Raby Bay for recreational boats moored either at the individual properties or in marinas. Construction commenced in 1983 and the first stage was officially opened on 23 November 1984 with 158 blocks to be sold at prices between $53,000 to $96,000 each. The canal estate was marketed under the name Raby Bay and this name is commonly used as a neighbourhood name to distinguish this land from that of the rest of Cleveland (of which it is officially part). As with other canal estates in Queensland, the Redland City Council finds itself under pressure to provide for maintenance of the canals in these canal estates as the original development company no longer exists. In 2014, it was estimated up to 23 kilometres of canal wall were in need of repair. The owners of the properties in the canal estate claim they should not have to pay a levy as the canals are not part of their land and should be maintained by the council in the same way as roads. However, other residents in Redland City do not believe that their rates should be increased to pay for expenses associated with residents who chose to purchase land in a canal estate.

== Environment ==
Raby Bay is known for its seagrass meadows, which support the local dugong population. The canal estate development destroyed seagrass meadows, mangroves and roosting sites for migratory wading birds. However, there are signs the seagrass is recovering in Raby Bay with sightings of the dugongs within the canals. However, larger populations of dugongs can be found in the Ormiston parts of the bay which have not been so affected by development.
