= Ormiston, Queensland =

Ormiston
- Suburb
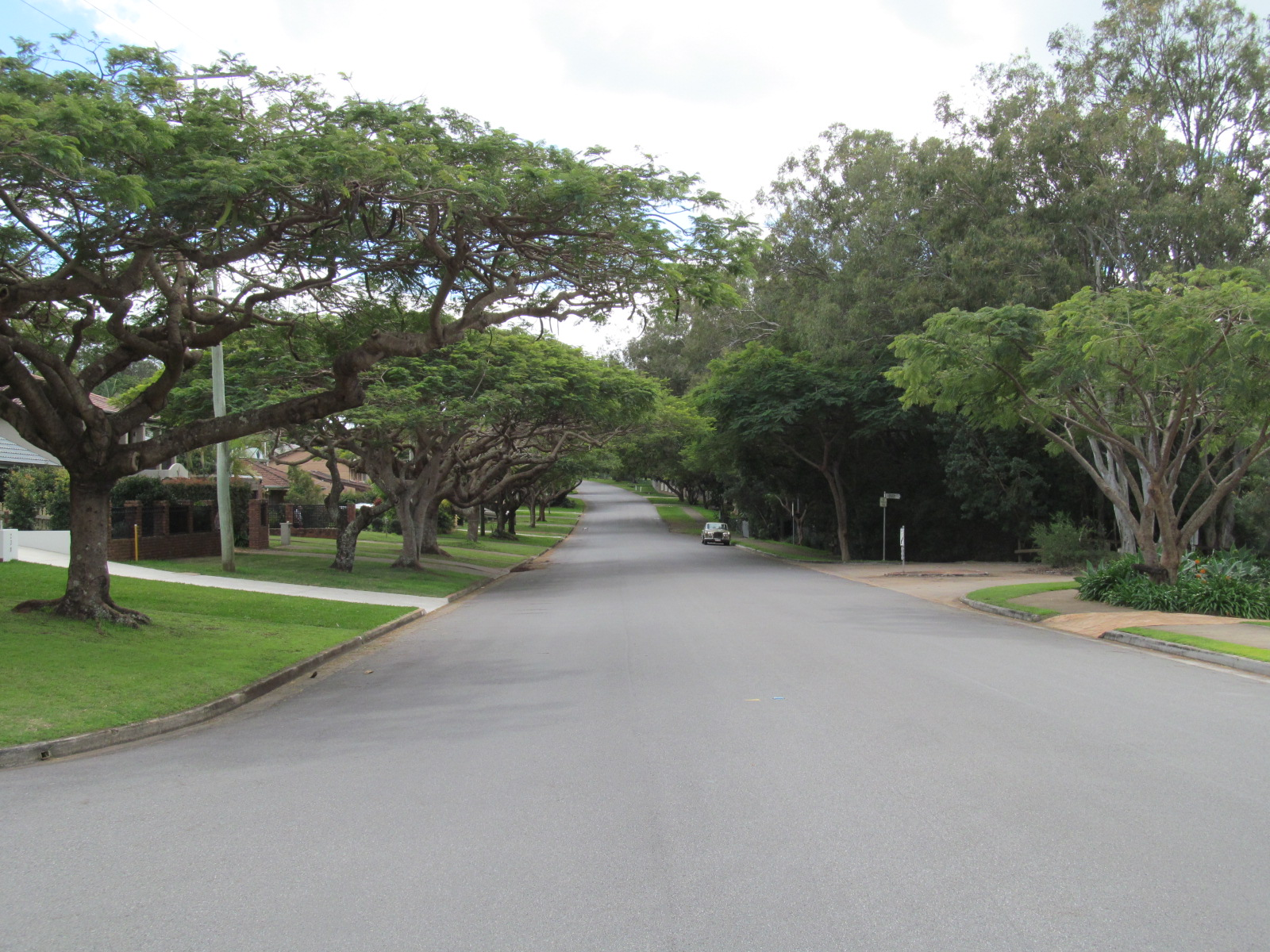
- Wellington Street, 2013

- Interactive map of Ormiston
- Coordinates: 27.5122°S 153.2541°E
- Country: Australia
- State: Queensland
- City: Redland City
- LGA: Redland City
- Location: 3.9 km (2.4 mi) NW of Cleveland; 28.3 km (17.6 mi) ESE of Brisbane CBD

Government
  - State electorate: Oodgeroo
  - Federal division: Bowman

Area
  - Total: 6.1 km^{2} (2.4 sq mi)

Population
  - Total: 6,379 (2021 census)
  - Density: 1,046/km^{2} (2,708/sq mi)
- Time zone: UTC+10:00 (AEST)
- Postcode: 4160
Suburbs around Ormiston
Wellington Point	Moreton Bay	Moreton Bay
Wellington Point	Ormiston	Cleveland
Alexandra Hills	Cleveland	Cleveland

Ormiston is a coastal residential locality in the City of Redland, Queensland, Australia. In the 2021 census, Ormiston had a population of 6,379 people.

== Geography ==
Ormiston is adjacent to the localities of Cleveland and Wellington Point. The southern half is bisected by the Cleveland railway line with the locality served by Ormiston railway station (27.5146°S 153.2558°E).

Empire Point lies on the coast (27.5004°S 153.2630°E) adjacent to Tolston Terrace.

The border in the west roughly aligns with Hillards Creek (27.4918°S 153.2574°E).

== History ==
The Koobenpul lived on the mainland coastal strip stretching from Talwarrapin (Redland Bay) to the mouth of the Mairwar (Brisbane River), including the area now known as Ormiston. Canoe trees and a bora ring from pre-settlement days still remain along Hilliards Creek.

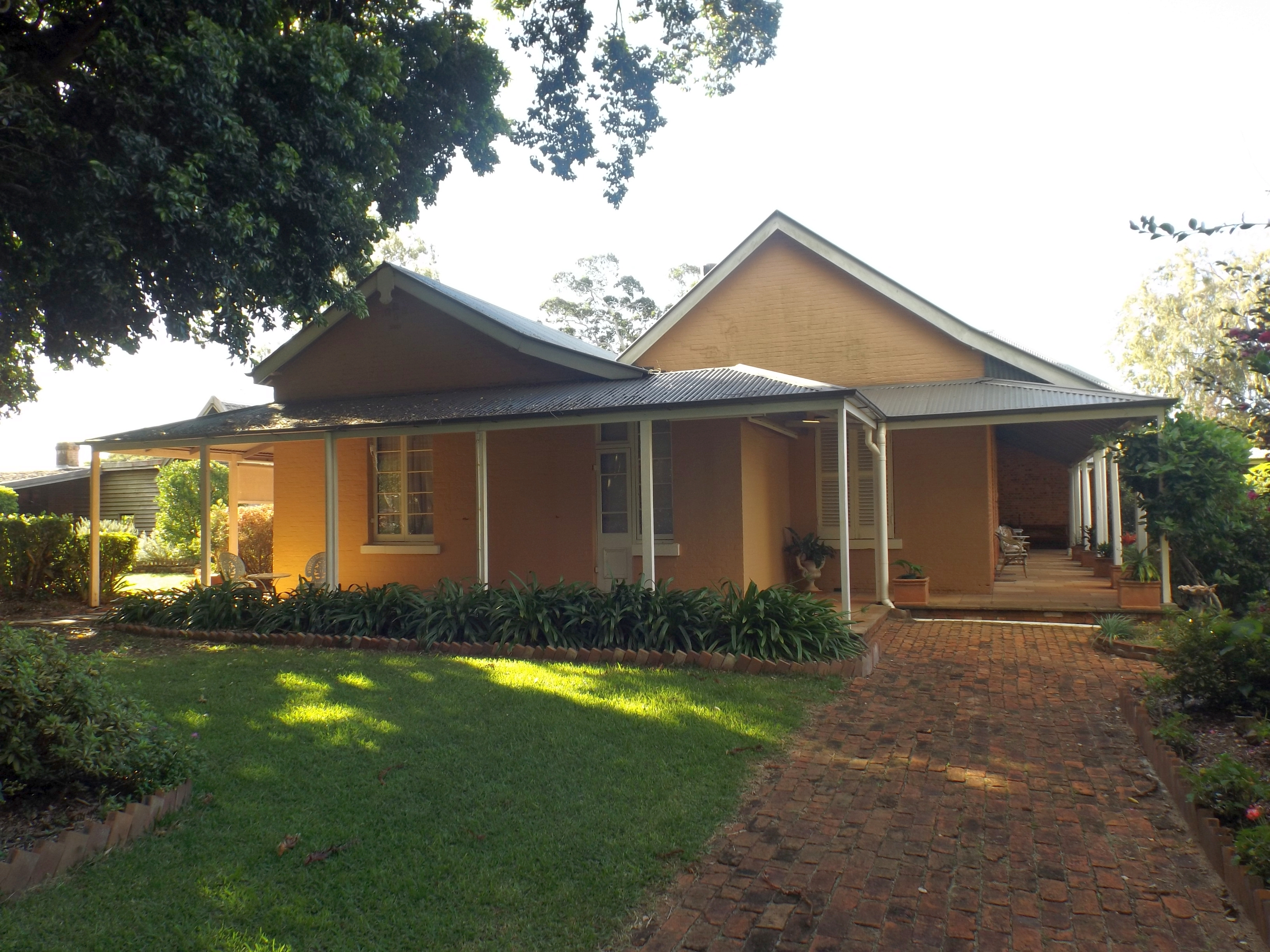
Ormiston House, 2015

Originally part of the township of Cleveland, early industry included a brickworks established by James Maskell on the eastern bank of Hilliards Creek in 1852 and fellmongery (wool scour) owned by a Thomas Blacket Stephens until the early 1860s. Joseph Clark raised cattle in the district from 1855 until he relinquished the lease in 1858.

Land around Ormiston was bought in 1853 by Captain Louis Hope, a Scottish aristocrat and a founder of the Queensland sugar industry. Hope built Ormiston House from 1858 and 1865 as the centre of a 325-acre (1.32 km^{2}) sugar estate. Ormiston House is one of the finest examples of colonial architecture in Queensland.

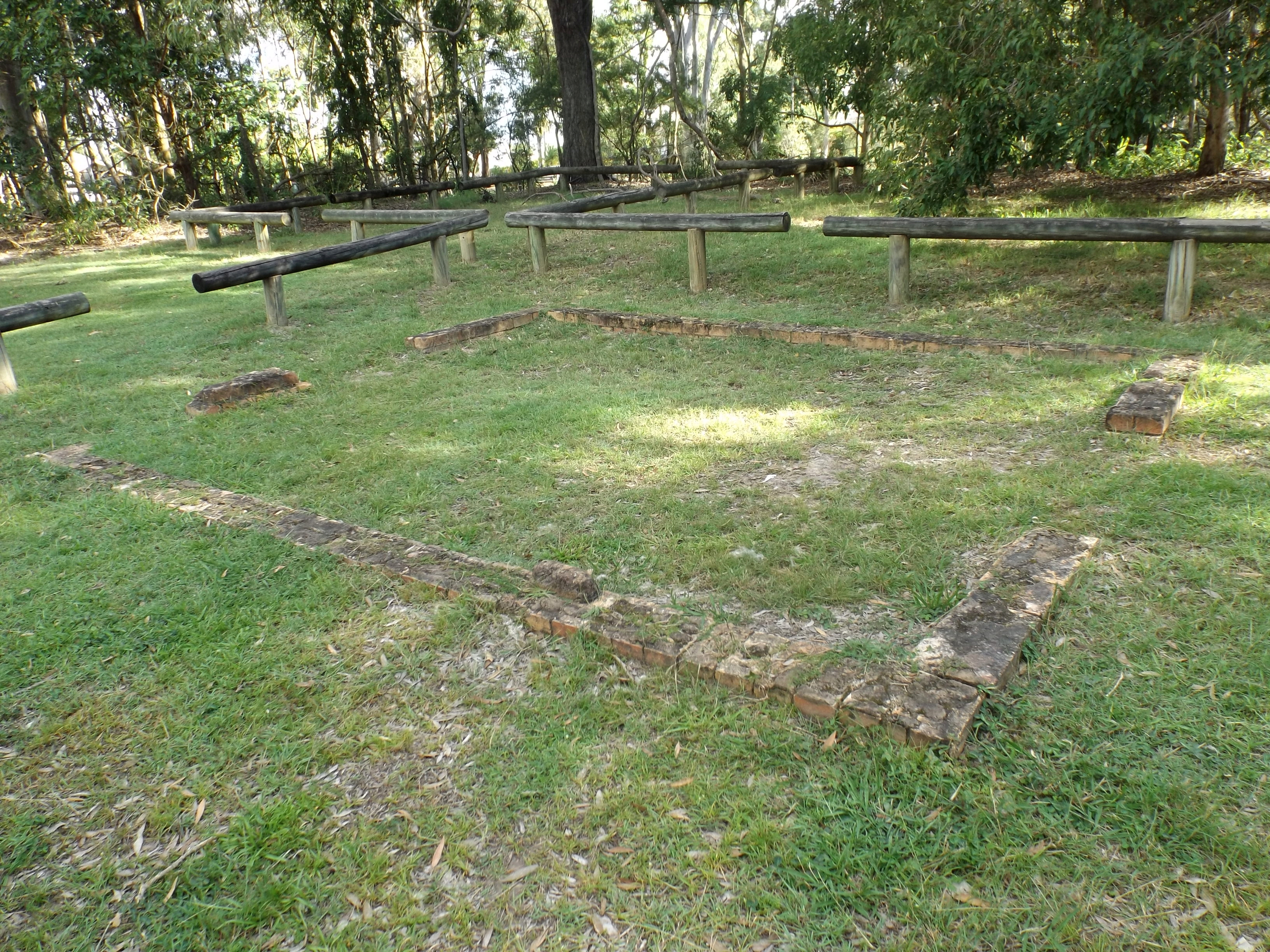
The remains of the Ormiston Fellmongery in 2015

The property was originally called Woojanness, but was renamed Ormiston after the Hope's family ancestral village of Ormiston, Scotland. It has an ornamental garden that dates from the building of the house. Hope continued with his plantation until 1875, until he lost a dispute over access to his sugar mill and decided to dismantle it. Since the 1960s the house has been a museum. Although the house was called Ormiston, the area around it was still known as Cleveland for many years. When the railway came through the area in 1889, the new railway station and the area around it also became known as Ormiston.

Cleveland West State School opened on 13 April 1872. It was renamed Ormiston State School circa 1900.

Ormiston College opened on 27 January 1988.

In July 2020, Brisbane Airport opened its new parallel runway, which caused a significant increase in air traffic over Ormiston residential areas. Depending on wind conditions, Ormiston experiences 110+ flights per day, with a monthly average of 64. This has led to some community anger, led by the federal member for Bowman, Henry Pike.

== Demographics ==
In the 2011 census, Ormiston recorded a population of 5,641 people, 52.4% female and 47.6% male. The median age of the Ormiston population was 44 years, 7 years above the national median of 37. 67.3% of people living in Ormiston were born in Australia. The other top responses for country of birth were England 9.9%, New Zealand 5.5%, South Africa 3.3%, Scotland 1.6%, Germany 0.8%. 90.8% of people spoke only English at home; the next most common languages were 0.7% German, 0.6% Afrikaans, 0.6% Mandarin, 0.5% Italian, 0.3% Greek.

In the 2016 census, Ormiston had a population of 5,793 people.

In the 2021 census, Ormiston had a population of 6,379 people.

== Heritage listings ==
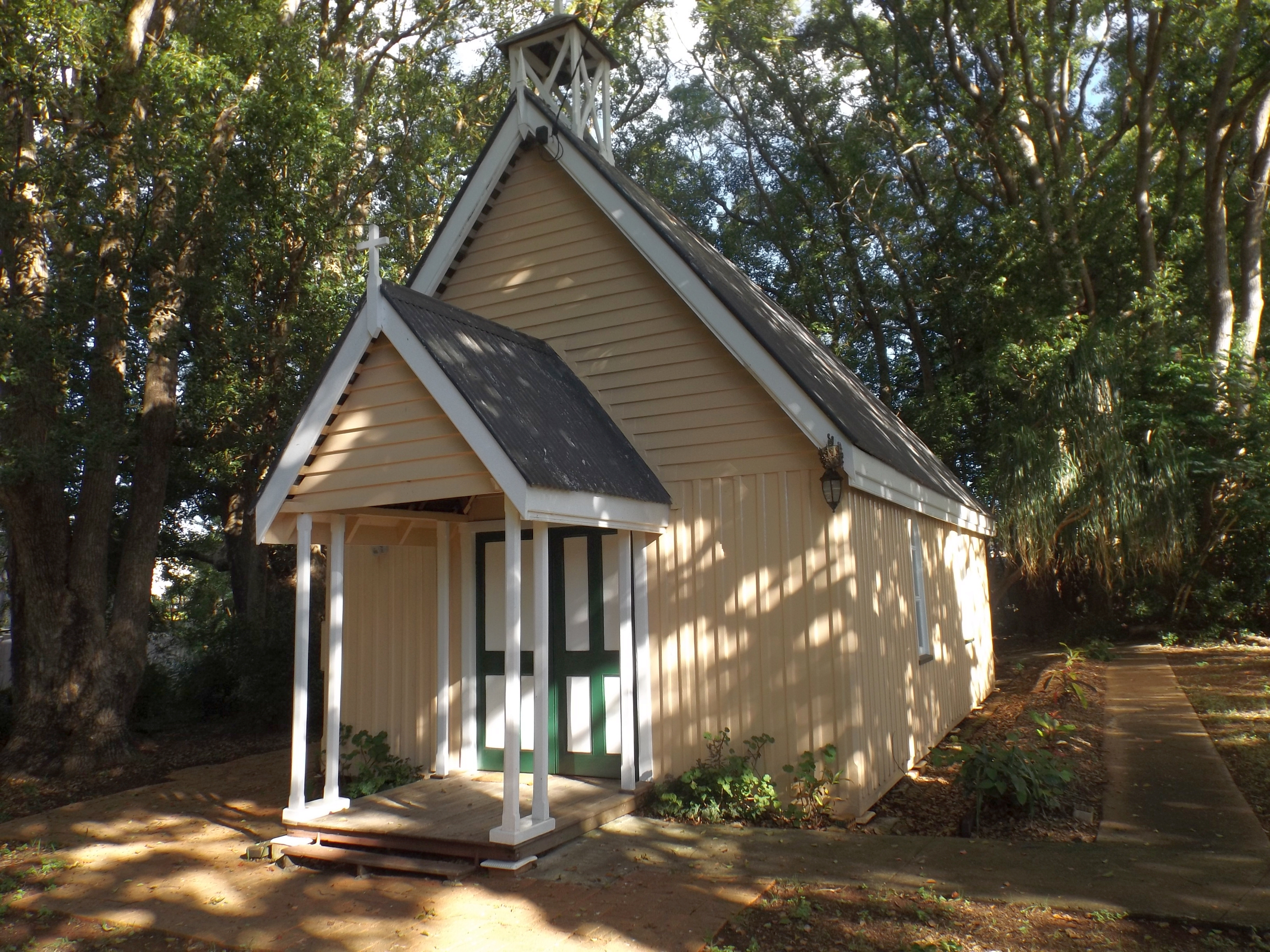
St Andrews Church, 2015

Ormiston has a number of heritage-listed sites, including:

- 11–13 Empire Vistas: Empire Point foreshore
- 56 Hilliard Street: Old Bridge over Hilliards Creek
- Sturgeon Street (27.5109°S 153.2476°E): Ormiston Fellmongery
- 277–295 Wellington Street (27.4966°S 153.2579°E): Ormiston House Estate
- 209–213 Wellington Street (27.5028°S 153.2575°E): St Andrews Church

== Education ==
Ormiston State School is a government primary (Prep–6) school for boys and girls at 82–110 Gordon Street (27.5164°S 153.2585°E). In 2017, the school had an enrolment of 608 students with 45 teachers (38 full-time equivalent) and 23 non-teaching staff (15 full-time equivalent). It includes a special education program.

Ormiston College is a private primary and secondary (Prep–12) school for boys and girls at 97 Dundas Street West (27.5153°S 153.2468°E). In 2017, the school had an enrolment of 1,279 students with 95 teachers (94 full-time equivalent) and 62 non-teaching staff (47 full-time equivalent).

There is no government secondary school in Ormiston. The nearest government secondary school is Cleveland District State High School in neighbouring Cleveland to the south.

== Amenities ==
Ormiston is home to the Redlands Christian Reformed Church.

Ormiston has the Ormiston Redbacks Swim Club (amateur swimming club), the Redlands Softball Association, the Ormiston Crushers (basketball, Red City Roar competition) and the Redlands Boxing Club.

== Attractions ==
Ormiston House is open to visitors with tours and events.

== Transport ==
Ormiston railway station provides access to regular Queensland Rail City network services to Brisbane and Cleveland.

== Notable residents ==
- John Cameron, built and occupied the house Doobawah in Ormiston
- Louis Hope, established the Ormiston Estate
