= Thorneside, Queensland =

Thorneside
- Suburb
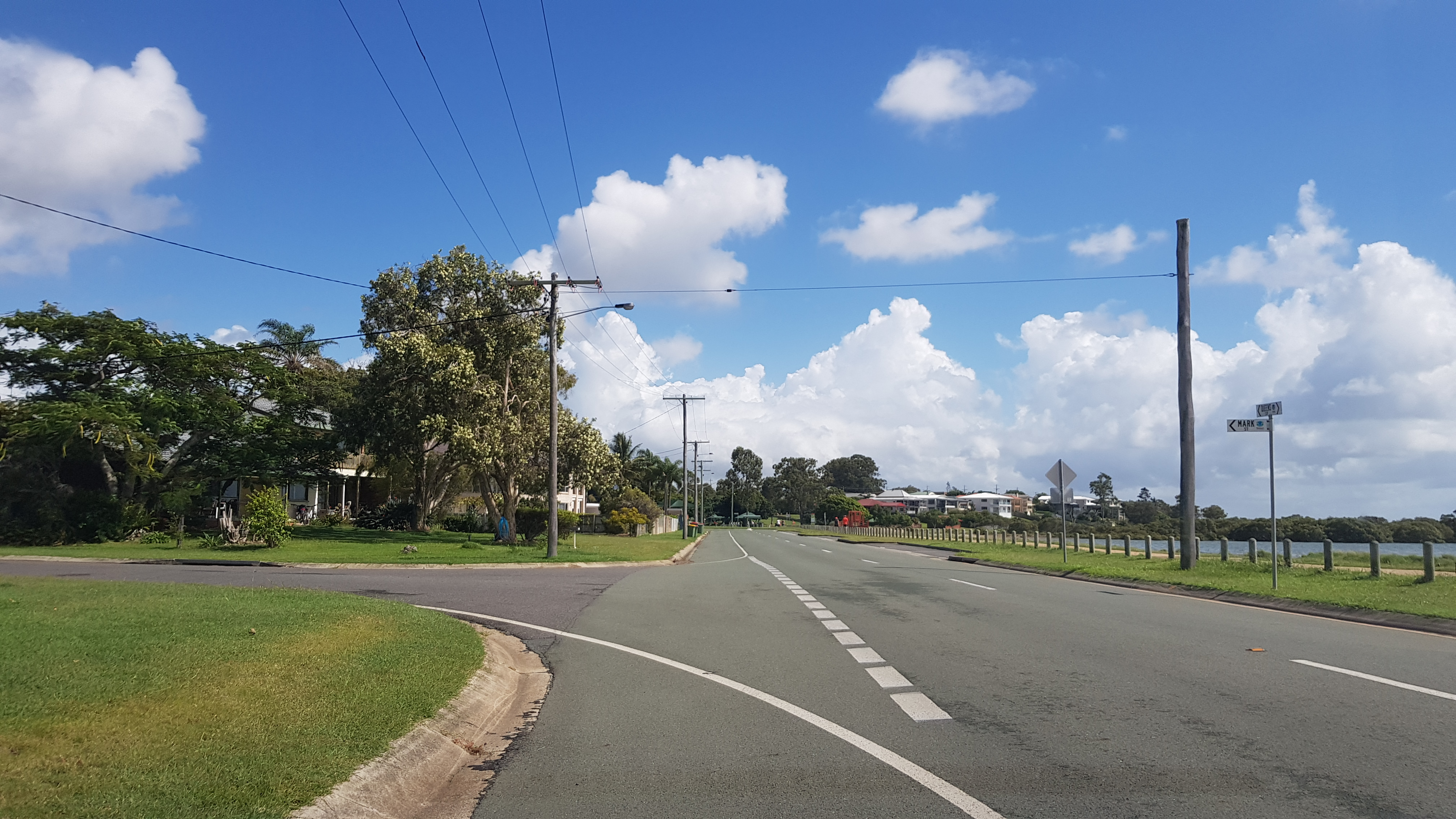
- Queens Esplanade, 2018

- Interactive map of Thorneside
- Coordinates: 27.4872°S 153.1994°E
- Country: Australia
- State: Queensland
- City: Redland City
- LGA: Redland City
- Location: 4.6 km (2.9 mi) W of Wellington Point; 7.6 km (4.7 mi) N of Capalaba; 11.8 km (7.3 mi) NW of Cleveland; 21.7 km (13.5 mi) E of Brisbane CBD

Government
  - State electorate: Capalaba
  - Federal division: Bowman

Area
  - Total: 3.2 km^{2} (1.2 sq mi)

Population
  - Total: 3,877 (2021 census)
  - Density: 1,212/km^{2} (3,140/sq mi)
- Time zone: UTC+10:00 (AEST)
- Postcode: 4158
Suburbs around Thorneside
Lota	Moreton Bay	Moreton Bay
Ransome	Thorneside	Birkdale
Ransome	Birkdale	Birkdale

Thorneside is a coastal urban locality in the City of Redland, Queensland, Australia. In the 2021 census, Thorneside had a population of 3,877 people.

== Geography ==
The locality is bounded to the north-east by Waterloo Bay (27.4759°S 153.2221°E), a part of Moreton Bay. It is bounded to the west by Tingalpa Creek. Mooroondu Point is the northernmost part of the locality at the mouth of the creek, jutting into the bay (27.4730°S 153.2015°E)

The Cleveland railway line enters the locality from the west (Ransome) and exits to the south-east (Birkdale) with the locality served by Thorneside railway station (27.4860°S 153.1928°E).

Residential development in the suburb is predominately housing estates built around Thorneside Road and Mooroondu Road.

== History ==
The locality is named after the Thorneside railway station, originally named Thorne's siding after William Thorne who bought a lot of land around Thorneside when it was originally subdivided in 1913. At that time the land was known as Thorne's estate.

== Demographics ==
In the 2011 census, Thorneside had a population of 3,548 people, 50.1% female and 49.9% male. The median age of the Thorneside population was 38 years, 1 year above the national median of 37. 74.2% of people living in Thorneside were born in Australia. The other top responses for country of birth were New Zealand 6.4%, England 5.7%, Scotland 0.8%, South Africa 0.7%, Ireland 0.7%. 90.6% of people spoke only English at home; the next most common languages were 0.4% Spanish, 0.3% Punjabi, 0.3% Russian, 0.3% French, 0.3% Japanese.

In the 2016 census, Thorneside had a population of 3,761 people.

In the 2021 census, Thorneside had a population of 3,877 people.

== Education ==
South East Brisbane Steiner School is a private primary (Preparatory to Year 6) school for boys and girls at 12 John Street (27.4800°S 153.2014°E). It is affiliated with Steiner Education Australia, a peak body for Steiner education in Australia.

There are no government schools in Thorneside. The nearest government primary school is Birkdale State School in neighbouring Birkdale to the south-east. The nearest government secondary school is Wellington Point State High School in Wellington Point to the east.

== Amenities ==
Thorneside Community Hall is at 200–204 Mooroondu Road; it is operated by the Redland City Council.

The Redland City Council operates a mobile library service which visits Beth Boyd Park and Thorneside Community Hall.

There is a boat ramp on the corner of Queens Esplanade and Helen Street on the south bank of Tingalpa Creek (27.4784°S 153.1980°E). It is managed by the Redland City Council.

=== Parks ===
There are a number of parks in the area:

- Beth Boyd Park, 76–92 Mooroondu Road
- Ferry Road Park (27.4845°S 153.1941°E)
- Frank Street Park (27.4901°S 153.2056°E)
- John Street Park (27.4795°S 153.2028°E)
- Railway Parade Park (27.4842°S 153.1918°E)
- William Taylor Memorial Sportsfield (27.4855°S 153.2054°E)

William Taylor Memorial Sportsfield (also known as Mooroondu Sports field has facilities for soccer, netball, cricket, and tennis.

=== Other amenities ===
Other amenities include:

- Willard Webber Reserve
- Queens Esplanade
- Canoe Club Located beside Tingalpa Creek
