= Birkdale railway station, Brisbane =

Railway station in Queensland, Australia

Birkdale
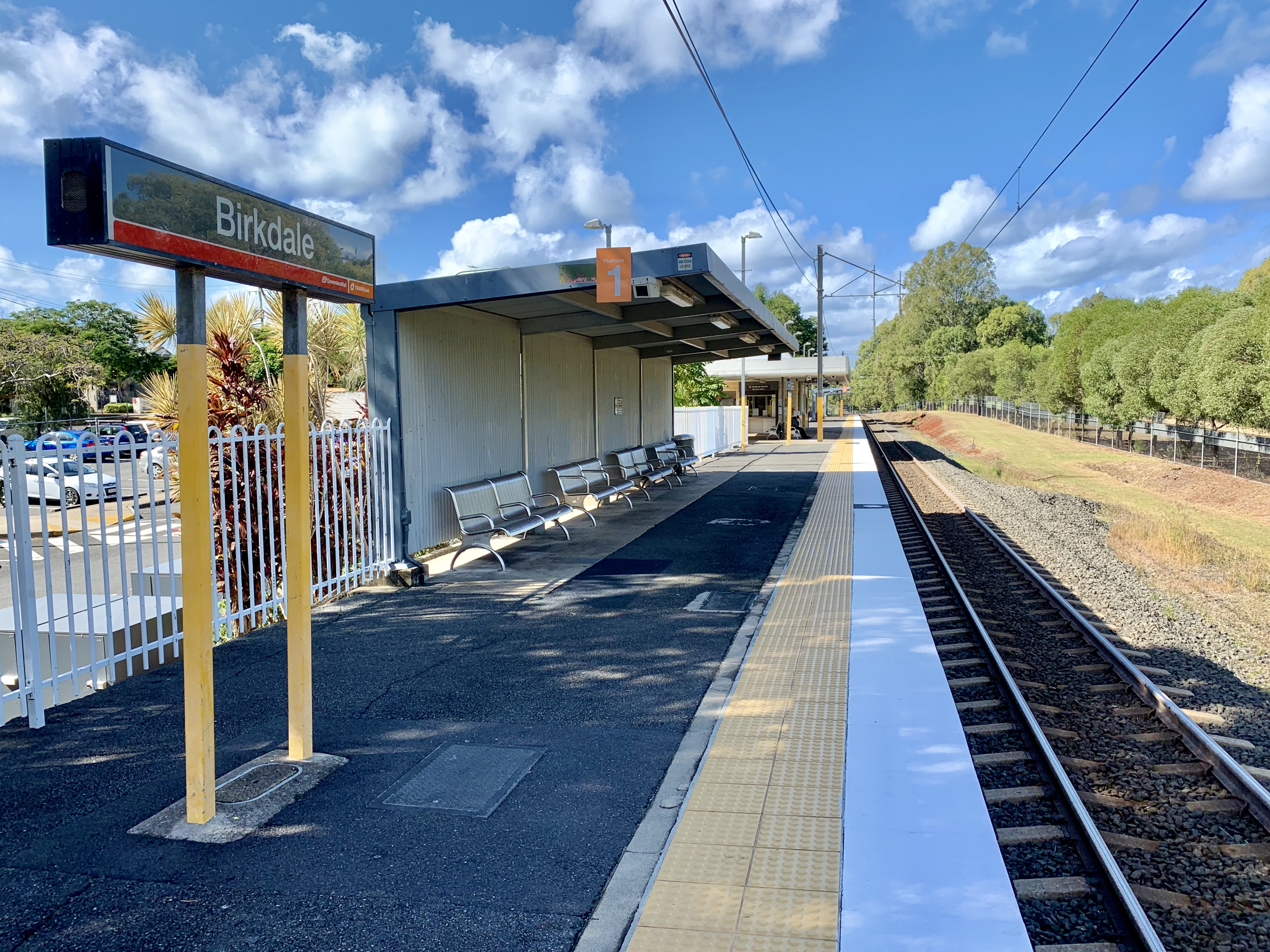
- Eastbound view from the station platform, May 2020

General information
- Location: Napier Street, Birkdale
- Coordinates: 27°29′38″S 153°13′07″E
- Owner: Queensland Rail
- Operator: Queensland Rail
- Line: T4 Cleveland
- Distance: 30.55 kilometres from Central
- Platforms: 1
- Tracks: 1

Construction
- Structure type: Ground
- Parking: 118 bays
- Accessible: Yes

Other information
- Station code: 600273
- Fare zone: Zone 2
- Website: Queensland Rail

History
- Opened: 1889
- Rebuilt: 1986

Services
Preceding station	Queensland Rail	Following station
Thorneside towards Shorncliffe via Roma Street	T4 Cleveland line	Wellington Point towards Cleveland
Location

Birkdale is a railway station operated by Queensland Rail on the Cleveland line. It opened in 1889 and serves the Redlands suburb of Birkdale. It is a ground level station, featuring one side platform.

== History ==
In 1889, the Cleveland line was extended from Manly to the original Cleveland station.

Birkdale station opened in 1889 at the same time as the line. On 1 November 1960, the station closed when the line was truncated to Lota. The station reopened on 26 July 1986 as the line was being rebuilt to Cleveland.

== Services ==
Birkdale is served by Cleveland line services from Shorncliffe, Northgate, Doomben and Bowen Hills to Cleveland.

== Platforms and services ==
Birkdale platform arrangement
Platform	Line	Destination	Notes
1	T4 Cleveland	Cleveland, Roma Street (to Shorncliffe line)	

== Transport links ==
Transdev Queensland operate two bus routes from Birkdale station:

- 254: Capalaba to Wellington Point
- 255: to Cleveland via Wellington Point
