= Birkdale, Queensland =

Birkdale
- Suburb
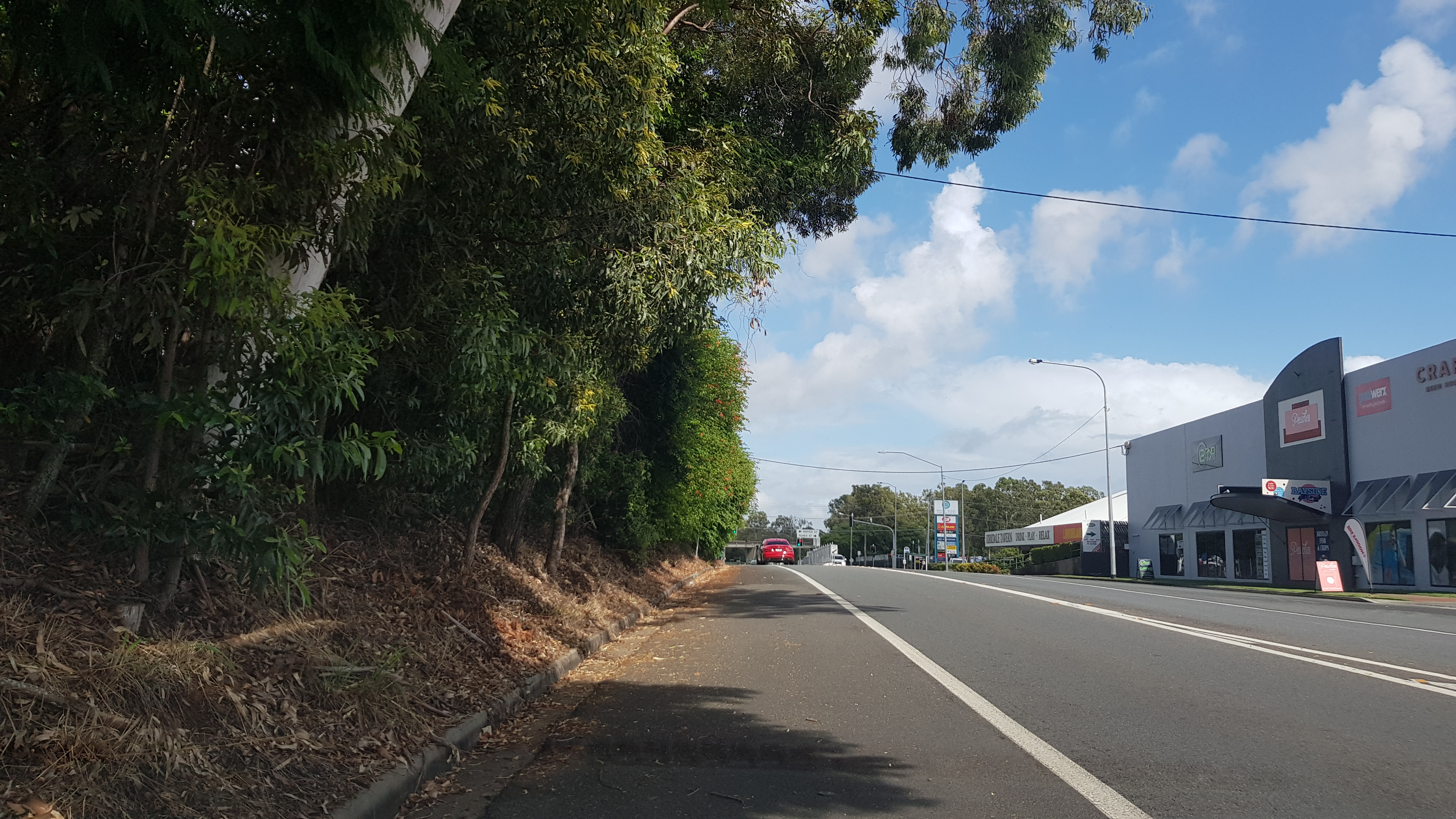
- Birkdale Road, 2018

- Interactive map of Birkdale
- Coordinates: 27.5002°S 153.2111°E
- Country: Australia
- State: Queensland
- City: Redland City
- LGA: City of Redland
- Location: 9.8 km (6.1 mi) NW of Cleveland; 22.9 km (14.2 mi) E of Brisbane CBD

Government
  - State electorates: Capalaba; Oodgeroo
  - Federal division: Bowman

Area
  - Total: 12.0 km^{2} (4.6 sq mi)

Population
  - Total: 14,816 (2021 census)
  - Density: 1,235/km^{2} (3,198/sq mi)
- Time zone: UTC+10:00 (AEST)
- Postcode: 4159
Suburbs around Birkdale
Thorneside	Thorneside	Wellington Point
Ransome	Birkdale	Wellington Point
Chandler	Capalaba	Alexandra Hills

Birkdale is a coastal locality in the City of Redland, Queensland, Australia. In the 2021 census, Birkdale had a population of 14,816 people.

== Geography ==
Birkdale stretches from Tingalpa Creek in the west, the border with Brisbane City, to Wellington Point in the east. Thorneside and Waterloo Bay are to its north, and Capalaba and Alexandra Hills are to its south.

The Cleveland railway line enters the locality from the north-west (Thorneside) and exits to the east (Wellington Point) with the locality being served by the Birkdale railway station (27.4940°S 153.2187°E).

Major features are a canal style housing development known as Aquatic Paradise, a significant shopping precinct located near Aquatic Paradise and a retirement village known as Wellington Manor.

There are two neighbourhoods in the locality:

- Poudalandyalbetser (27.4974°S 153.1908°E).
- Tanganghur (27.4929°S 153.1951°E)

It is also home to one of the Redlands Waste Transfer Stations (27.5089°S 153.2264°E), which (as of July 2012) is provided to the residents of the city free of charge. It encourages residents to recycle such items as green waste, cardboard etc. and helps in the proper disposal of hazardous materials.

The Redland Whitewater Centre is to be built in the Birkdale Community Precinct for use in white-water canoeing events at the 2032 Summer Olympics.

== History ==
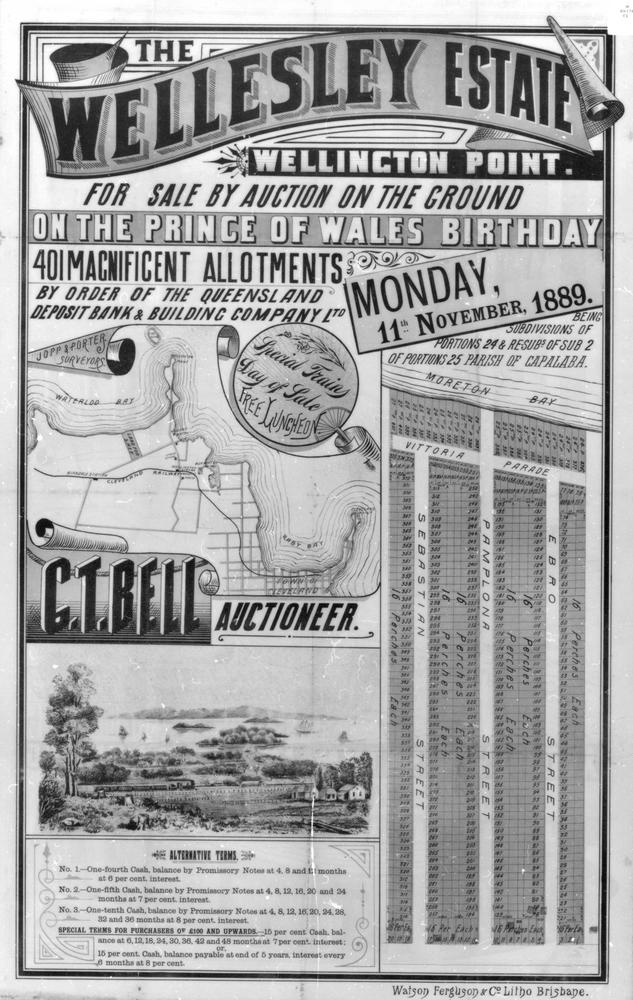
Advertising poster for land sale at Wellington Point (now the area around Bath & Cavell Streets, Birkdale), 1889

The name Birkdale comes from Birkdale House in Roger Street, the home of settler and vigneron James Baron. It was used as the name of the railway station constructed in 1889.

William Thorne was another early local land owner.

Birkdale State School opened on 27 November 1916 with 28 students.

In the 1920s, poultry was a major industry in Birkdale.

Mary MacKillop Catholic Primary School opened on 20 April 1997.

Birkdale South State School opened on 25 January 1982.

== Demographics ==
In the 2016 census, Birkdale recorded a population of 14,497 people, 50.8% female and 49.2% male. The median age of the Birkdale population was 39 years, 2 years above the national median of 37. 75.2% of people living in Birkdale were born in Australia. The other top responses for country of birth were England 5.8%, New Zealand 4.9%, South Africa 1.3%, Netherlands 1.2%, Scotland 0.8%. 90% of people spoke only English at home; the next most common languages were 1.1% Dutch, 0.5% German, 0.5% Mandarin, 0.4% Vietnamese, 0.4% Italian.

In the 2021 census, Birkdale had a population of 14816 people.

== Heritage listings ==
Birkdale has a number of heritage-listed sites, including:

- US Army Radio Receiving Station, 362–388 Old Cleveland Road East (27.5095°S 153.2031°E)
- School of Arts Hall, 101 Birkdale Road (27.4961°S 153.2131°E)

== Education ==
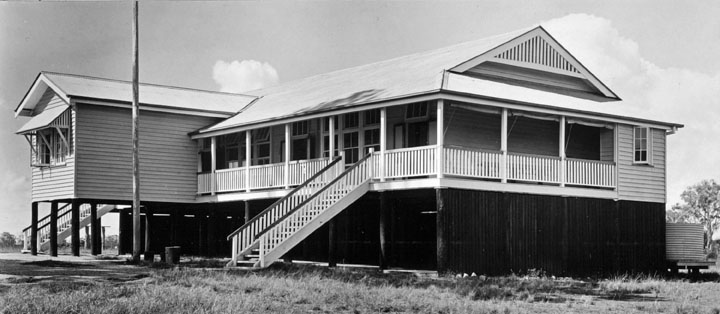
Birkdale State School, April 1951

Birkdale State School is a government primary (Prep–6) school for boys and girls at 74 Agnes Street (corner of Birkdale Road, 27.4912°S 153.2161°E). In 2017, the school had an enrolment of 646 students, predominantly drawn from the suburbs of Thorneside and Birkdale, with 43 teachers (39 full-time equivalent) and 20 non-teaching staff (15 full-time equivalent). In 2018, the school had an enrolment of 629 students with 43 teachers (39 full-time equivalent) and 19 non-teaching staff (15 full-time equivalent). It includes a special education program.

Birkdale South State School is a government primary (Prep–6) school for boys and girls at 451 Old Cleveland Road East (27.5058°S 153.2126°E). In 2017, the school had an enrolment of 583 students with 44 teachers (37 full-time equivalent) and 19 non-teaching staff (14 full-time equivalent). The school's catchment area has transitioned from small crop farms to residential estates. In 2018, the school had an enrolment of 583 students with 46 teachers (39 full-time equivalent) and 25 non-teaching staff (17 full-time equivalent). It includes a special education program.

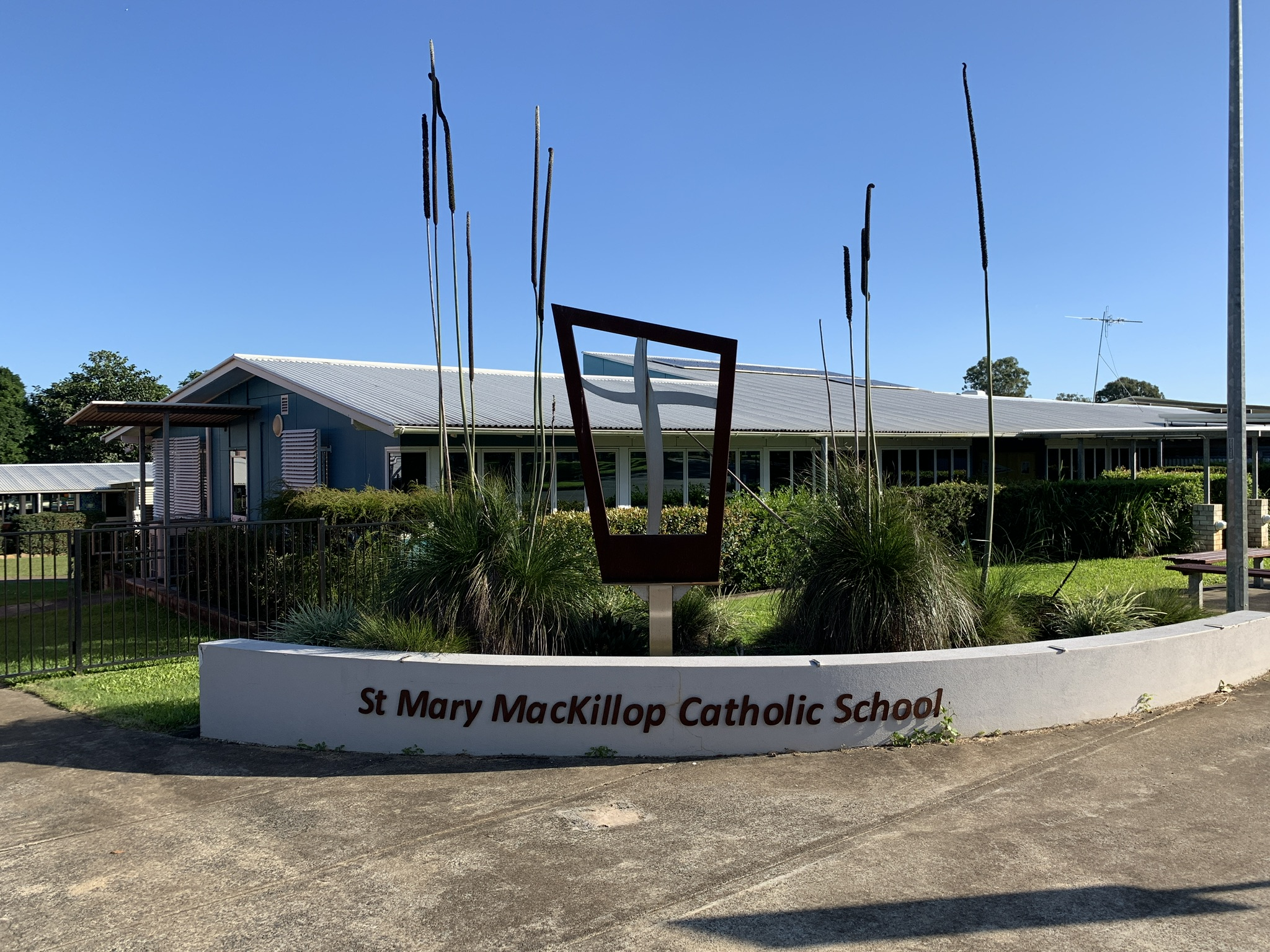
St Mary MacKillop Catholic School, 2022

St Mary MacKillop Primary School is a Catholic primary (Prep–6) school for boys and girls at 10 Hardy Road (27.4983°S 153.2287°E). In 2018, the school had an enrolment of 576 students with 39 teachers (34 full-time equivalent) and 26 non-teaching staff (16 full-time equivalent).

There are no secondary schools in Birkdale. The nearest government secondary schools are Wellington Point State High School in neighbouring Wellington Point to the east (on the boundary with Birkdale) and Alexandra Hills State High School in neighbouring Alexandra Hills to the south-east.

== Transport ==
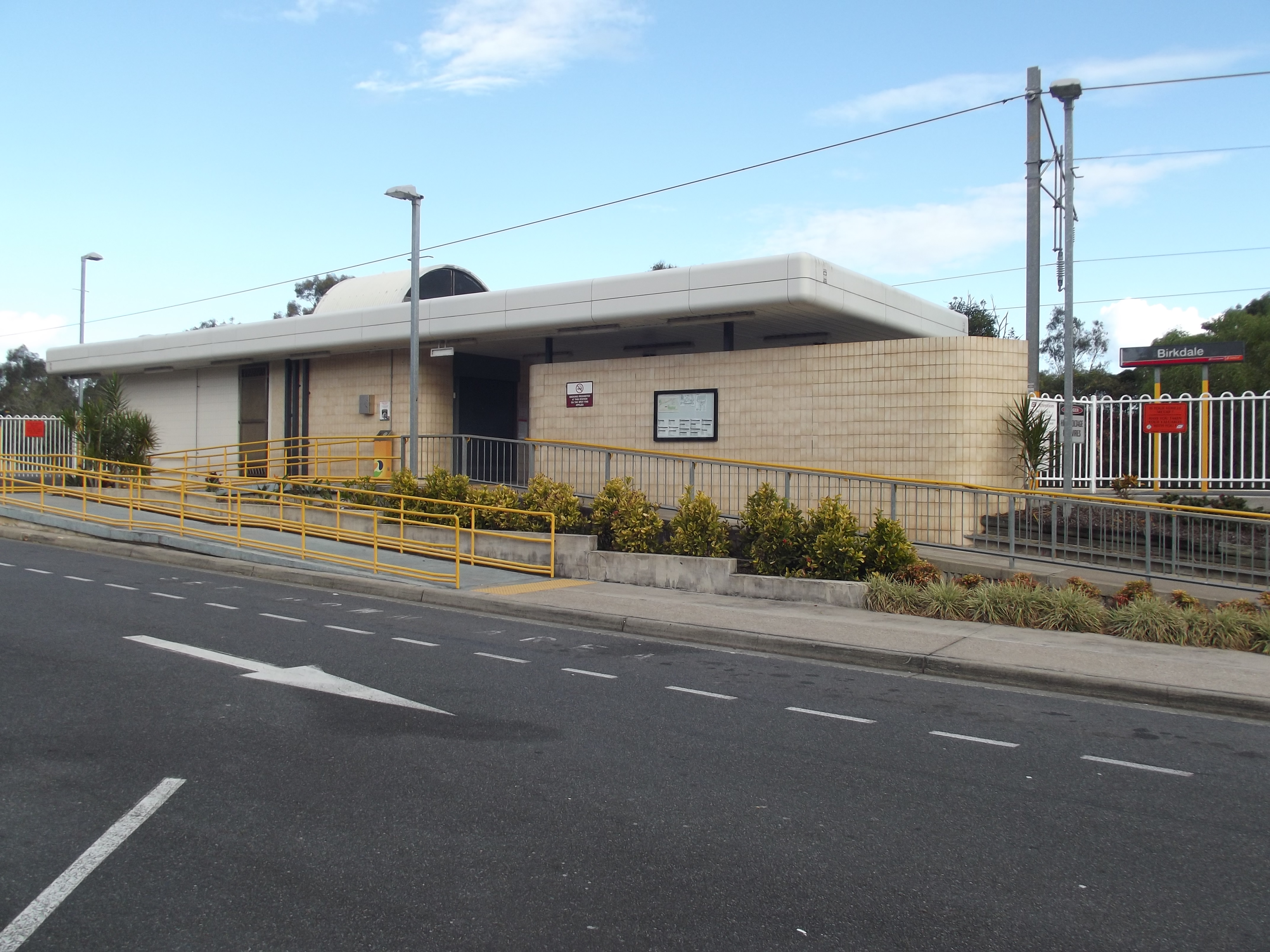
Birkdale Railway Station, 2012

Birkdale railway station provides access to regular Queensland Rail City network services to Brisbane and Cleveland.

== Sporting clubs ==
- Birkdale Mud Crabs Cricket Club
- Bayside Ravens Gridiron Club
- Redlands Rugby Union Club

== Youth organisations ==
- Birkdale Scout Group

== Parks ==
There are a number of parks in the locality:

- Aquatic Paradise Park (27.4821°S 153.2161°E)
- Bailey Road Park (27.5110°S 153.2153°E)
- Birkdale Bushland Refuge (27.5017°S 153.2210°E)
- Birkdale Fodder Forest (27.5030°S 153.2068°E)
- Bynd Road Park (27.4977°S 153.2062°E)
- Byng Road Park (27.4962°S 153.2067°E)
- Creek Road Park (27.5001°S 153.2035°E)
- Howeston Golf Course (27.4981°S 153.1987°E)
- Judy Holt Sportsfield (27.5113°S 153.2223°E)
- Mary Street Park (27.4906°S 153.2151°E)
- Pine Forest Park (27.4850°S 153.2219°E)
- Pitstachio Court Park (27.4949°S 153.2098°E)
- Quarry Road Park (27.4923°S 153.2030°E)
- Tarradarrapin Wetlands (27.5006°S 153.2258°E)
- The Frederick Radunza Reserve (27.5093°S 153.2094°E)
- Three Paddocks Park (27.4858°S 153.2284°E)
- Tingalpa Creek Reserve (27.4924°S 153.1920°E)
- Valantine Park (27.5159°S 153.2107°E)
- William Taylor Park (27.4922°S 153.2146°E)

== Climate ==
Birkdale has a humid subtropical climate (Köppen climate classification Cfa) with hot, humid summers and mild winters. From November through March, thunderstorms are common, with the more severe events accompanied by large damaging hail stones, torrential rain and destructive winds.

Climate data for Redlands
Month	Jan	Feb	Mar	Apr	May	Jun	Jul	Aug	Sep	Oct	Nov	Dec	Year
Record high °C (°F)	37.5 (99.5)	38.2 (100.8)	35.6 (96.1)	32.7 (90.9)	29.3 (84.7)	25.9 (78.6)	27.4 (81.3)	31.6 (88.9)	33.4 (92.1)	35.1 (95.2)	36.6 (97.9)	36.6 (97.9)	38.2 (100.8)
Mean daily maximum °C (°F)	28.9 (84.0)	28.6 (83.5)	27.7 (81.9)	25.9 (78.6)	23.3 (73.9)	21.0 (69.8)	20.5 (68.9)	21.5 (70.7)	23.6 (74.5)	25.3 (77.5)	26.8 (80.2)	28.2 (82.8)	25.1 (77.2)
Mean daily minimum °C (°F)	19.9 (67.8)	20.0 (68.0)	18.6 (65.5)	15.7 (60.3)	12.5 (54.5)	9.7 (49.5)	8.2 (46.8)	8.3 (46.9)	11.0 (51.8)	14.2 (57.6)	16.7 (62.1)	18.7 (65.7)	14.5 (58.1)
Record low °C (°F)	9.5 (49.1)	13.0 (55.4)	10.9 (51.6)	5.0 (41.0)	2.3 (36.1)	1.0 (33.8)	0.0 (32.0)	0.1 (32.2)	2.6 (36.7)	4.2 (39.6)	5.7 (42.3)	9.2 (48.6)	0.0 (32.0)
Average precipitation mm (inches)	154.3 (6.07)	161.5 (6.36)	163.2 (6.43)	105.7 (4.16)	113.2 (4.46)	87.6 (3.45)	61.8 (2.43)	52.4 (2.06)	39.1 (1.54)	84.0 (3.31)	104.5 (4.11)	143.7 (5.66)	1,269.1 (49.96)
Average precipitation days	11.5	12.9	12.8	11.3	10.2	8.1	7.2	6.2	7.0	9.1	10.2	10.7	117.2
Source: Bureau of Meteorology

== Notable citizens ==
- Peter Airley (1865–1950), school teacher, politician and writer
- Wally Lewis (1 December 1959 – ), Rugby League player, sports presenter
- Mirusia Louwerse (29 March 1985 – ), opera singer
- George Randall (1843–1930), confectionery manufacturer, migration officer and orchardist
