= Badgen railway station =

Former railway station in Queensland, Australia

Badgen

General information
- Location: Badgen Road, Wellington Point
- Coordinates: 27.4928°S 153.2299°E
- Line: Cleveland line
- Platforms: 1 total (1 side platform)

History
- Opened: 1916
- Closed: 1960
Location

Badgen Station was a railway station on the Cleveland Line in Wellington Point, Redland City, Queensland, Australia. It opened in 1916 just east of Badgen Road. It closed in 1960 with the closure of the railway beyond Lota and was demolished soon after. It was not rebuilt when the line was reopened in 1987.
