= Thorneside railway station =

Railway station in Queensland, Australia

Thorneside
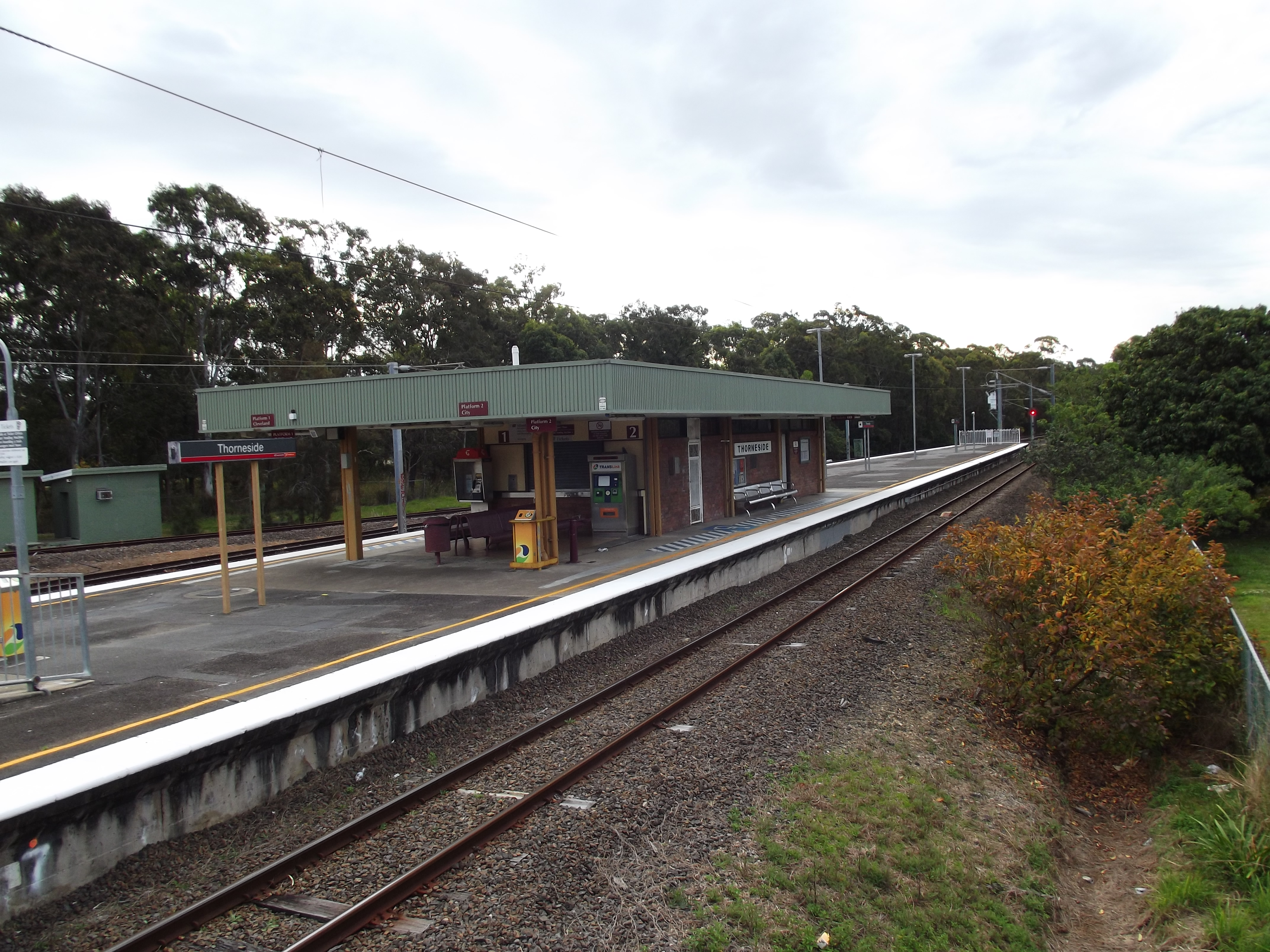
- Westbound view of Platform 2, August 2012

General information
- Location: Railway Parade, Thorneside
- Coordinates: 27°29′10″S 153°11′34″E
- Owner: Queensland Rail
- Operator: Queensland Rail
- Line: T4 Cleveland
- Distance: 27.76 kilometres from Central
- Platforms: 2 (1 island)
- Tracks: 2

Construction
- Structure type: Ground
- Parking: 133 bays

Other information
- Station code: 600271 (platform 1); 600272 (platform 2)
- Fare zone: Zone 2
- Website: Translink

History
- Opened: 1889; 137 years ago
- Rebuilt: 1917; 109 years ago, 1982; 44 years ago
- Former names: Waterloo; Ransome's railway siding

Services
Preceding station	Queensland Rail	Following station
Lota towards Shorncliffe via Roma Street	T4 Cleveland line	Birkdale towards Cleveland
Location

Thorneside is a railway station operated by Queensland Rail on the Cleveland line. It opened in 1889 and serves the Redlands suburb of Thorneside. It is a ground level station, featuring one island platform with two faces.

== History ==
In 1889, the Cleveland line was extended from Manly to the original Cleveland station.

Thorneside station opened in 1889 as Waterloo. It was closed in 1890 and reopened in 1909 as Ransome's railway siding. In 1912, the station closed again when Ransome's railway siding was relocated over Tingalpa Creek. In 1917, the station reopened under the current name of Thorneside.

On 1 November 1960, the station closed when the line was truncated to Lota. The station reopened on 25 September 1982 and served as an interim terminus as the line was being rebuilt to Cleveland. Adjacent to the station lies a turning angle.

== Services ==
Thorneside is served by Cleveland line services from Shorncliffe, Northgate, Doomben and Bowen Hills to Cleveland.

== Platforms and services ==
Thorneside platform arrangement
Platform	Line	Destination	Notes
1	T4 Cleveland	Roma Street (to Shorncliffe line)	
2	T4 Cleveland	Cleveland	

== Transport links ==
Transdev Queensland operate one bus route from Thorneside station:

- 253: to Capalaba
