= Whepstead, Wellington Point =

Historic house in Queensland, Australia

Whepstead
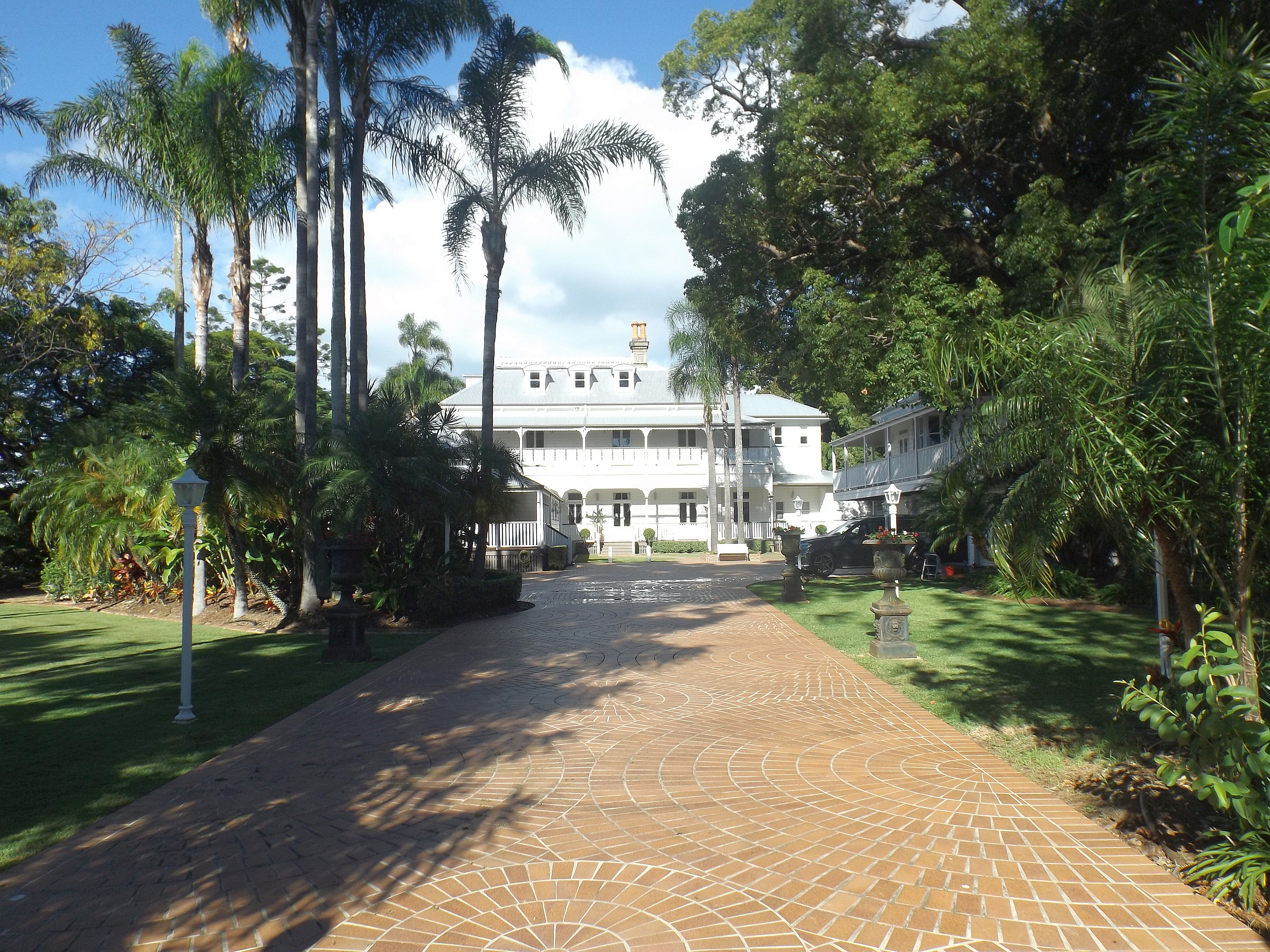
- Front view, 2015

- Location within Queensland Location within Australia
- 27.4978°S 153.24°E
- Location: Main Road, Wellington Point, City of Redland, Queensland, Australia

History
- Design period: 1870s–1890s (late 19th century)
- Built: 1889
- Built for: Gilbert Burnett

Site notes
- Architect: Claude William Chambers

Queensland Heritage Register
- Official name: Whepstead, Bay View Private Hospital, Fernbourne
- Type: state heritage (landscape, archaeological, built)
- Designated: 21 October 1992
- Reference no.: 600776
- Significant period: 1870s–1890s (fabric, historical)
- Significant components: residential accommodation – main house, garden/grounds, views to, views from, service wing, attic
- Builders: Patrick Horisk

Whepstead is a heritage-listed villa at Main Road, Wellington Point, City of Redland, Queensland, Australia. It was designed by architect Claude William Chambers and built in 1889 by Patrick Horisk. It is also known as Bay View Private Hospital and Fernbourne. It was added to the Queensland Heritage Register on 21 October 1992.

== History ==
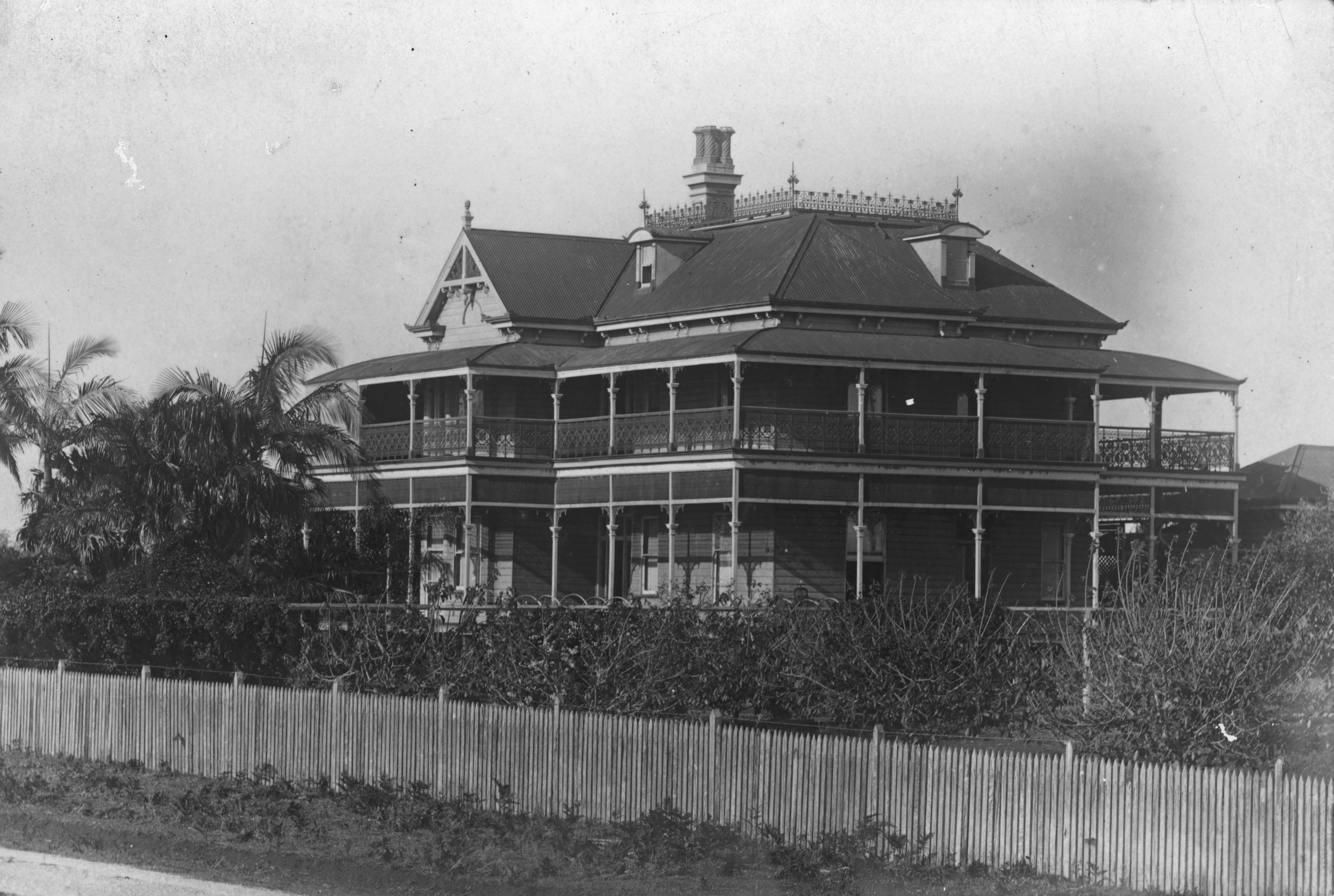
Whepstead, circa 1909

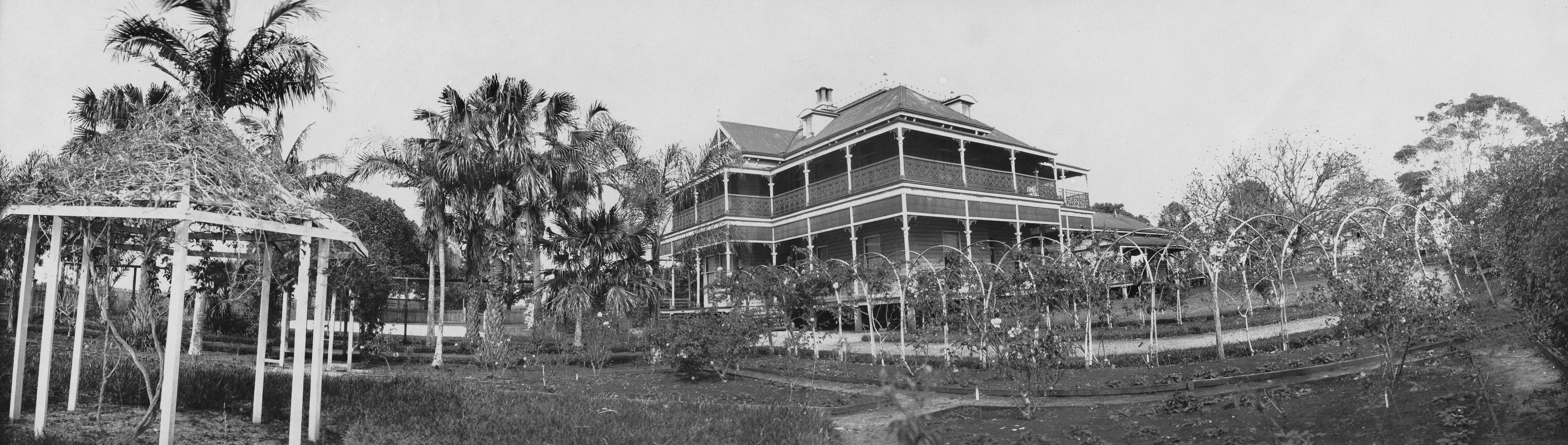
Whepstead House, circa 1920

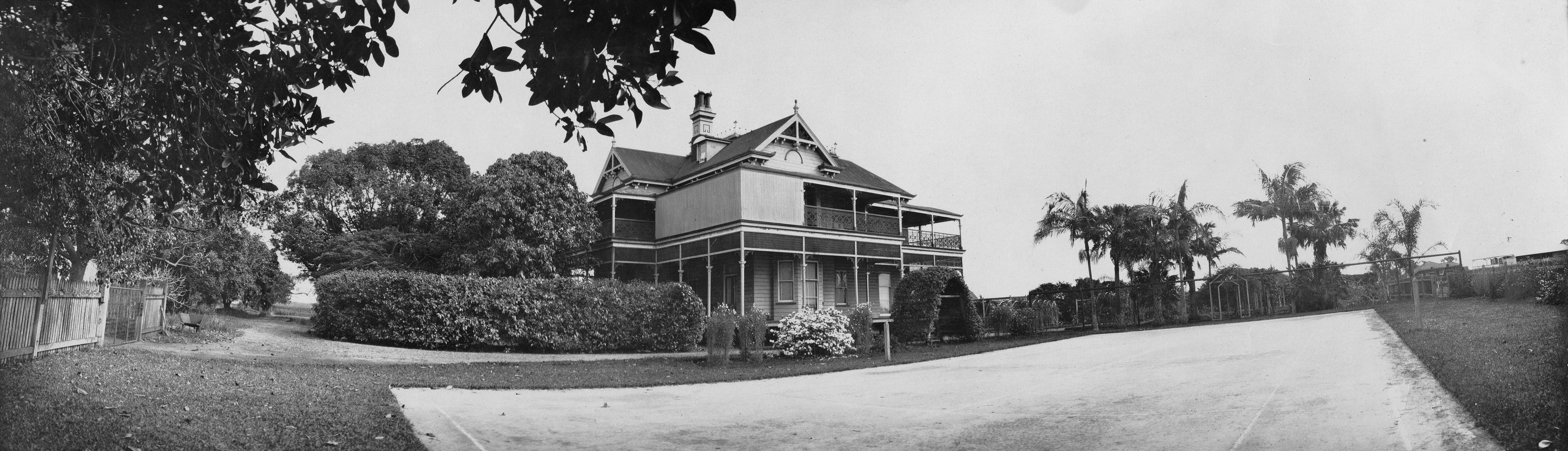
Whepstead House, circa 1920

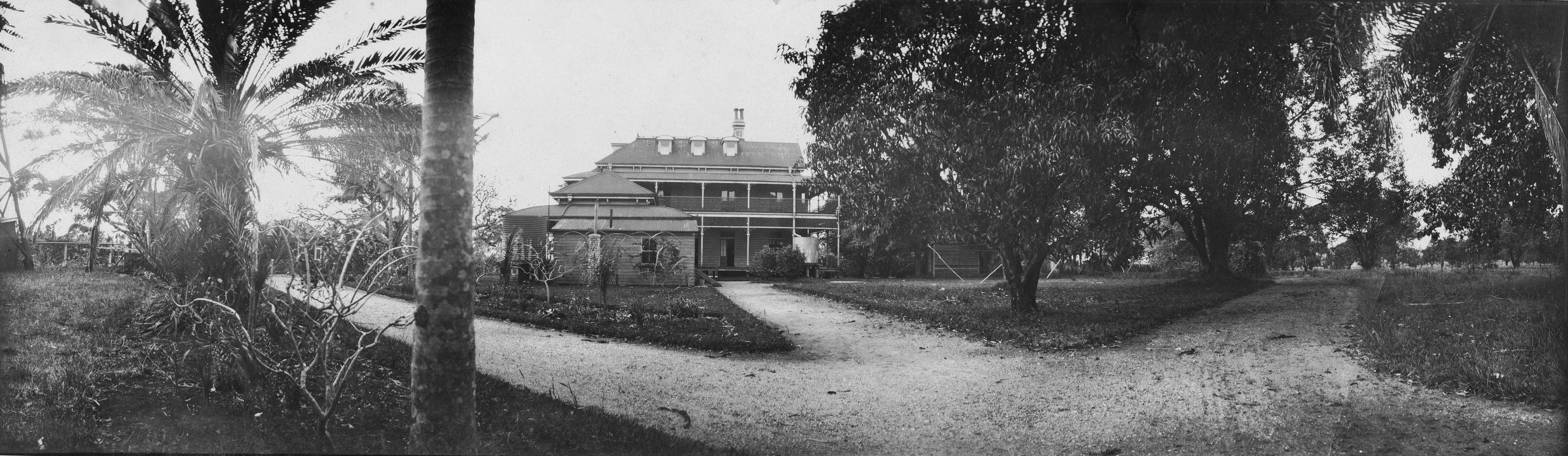
Whepstead House, circa 1920

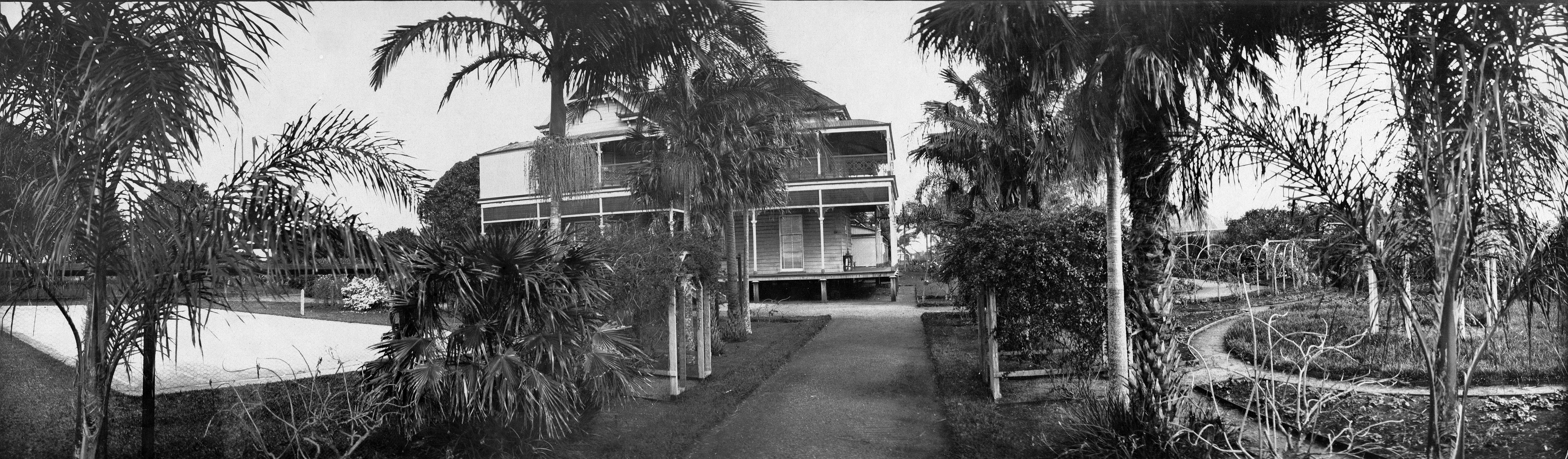
Whepstead House, circa 1920

Whepstead, a large two-storeyed timber residence with a substantial attic, was constructed in 1889 for Gilbert Burnett JP, a Wellington Point landowner, sawmill proprietor, and member of the Cleveland Divisional Board. Originally called Fernbourne, the house was designed by Brisbane architect Claude William Chambers and constructed by Cleveland builder Patrick Horisk. When first erected, it was considered one of the finest houses in the district, with unrivalled views of sea, shore, headland and islands. Set in a very fine, well-established garden, Fernbourne replaced an earlier Burnett family home on the same site.

Burnett had emigrated from England to Queensland in 1866, aged 20 years. He married Martha Ann Dawson in the late 1860s and in the early 1870s first managed his father-in-law's sugar plantation at Tingalpa, then was employed as overseer at Ormiston House Estate, Louis Hope's sugar plantation near Cleveland. In April 1875 he acquired from Hope a seven-year lease, with an option to buy, on the bulk of the Ormiston estate west and north of Hilliards Creek near Wellington Point. This land he purchased from Hope in 1881.

Burnett called his Wellington Point estate Trafalgar Vale, developing it initially as a sugar plantation, dependent on indentured labour from the South Pacific Islands. He purchased Hope's sugar mill machinery and set up his own mill about a quarter of a mile west of Hilliards Creek. By mid-1883, Burnett's cane fields at Trafalgar Vale were well established, and he had operating the sugar mill (using the open-pan system which produced a dark sugar), a sawmill, and a bone-mill, the latter providing fertiliser for the cane. Burnett also was buying up local cane for crushing, and reportedly was considering ordering a large new vacuum pan to produce white sugar, which had proved highly successful in northern mills.

The sawmill at Trafalgar Vale was established initially to cut timber for extensions to Burnett's sugar mill, but local orders for milled hardwood had encouraged him to expand his sawmilling operations. Subsequently, political antipathy toward the indentured labour system and the potential expense of converting his sugar mill to the vacuum pan method, prompted Burnett to turn to sawmilling as his principal enterprise. By November 1884 he had ceased the cultivation and manufacture of sugar at Trafalgar Vale, and had established in its place what he claimed was the largest country sawmill in the colony.

Between mid-1883 and late 1884, planing and dressing machinery to work soft timbers such as pine, cedar and beech were acquired; the Eucalypta, an 85 feet (26 m) long steamer, was built for Burnett to transport cypress pine from the Moreton Bay islands (Amity Point on Stradbroke Island, Coochiemudlo Island and Macleay Island) and hardwood from the Tweed Heads, Nerang, Coomera and Logan River districts to his mill, the timber being unloaded at Hilliards Creek; a wharf with a large overhead travelling crane was erected on the creek about 300 yards below the mill buildings; a tramway was laid to transport logs from the wharf to the mill (in 1885 the tramway was extended about three-quarters of a mile to give direct access to the bay); and an 8-ton boiler was installed to generate the steam to drive the horizontal saw, circular saws, planning machines and lathes, which could produce 40,000 feet (12,000 m) of dressed timber a week. The South Pacific Islanders had gone. In November 1884, Trafalgar Vale sawmill employed about 40 non-indentured workers, most of whom lived in cottages near the mill. By 1889 the number of employees had risen to 50. Several of Burnett's sons also worked in the family business.

In the mid-1880s, Burnett entered into partnership with a number of Brisbane businessmen to subdivide much of the former Trafalgar Vale plantation as the Wellington Point Estate. The estate sold reasonably well, as the railway line was about to be extended to Wellington Point and on to Cleveland. Further subdivision and sales were made by the syndicate in the late 1880s, by which time the railway had arrived.

Gilbert Burnett was an important identity in the local community. He was a major employer of local labour, a Justice of the Peace, a member of the Tingalpa Divisional Board for many years, and first chairman of the Cleveland Divisional Board in 1885. In 1889, he replaced his earlier and more modest home with the large timber house now known as Whepstead, but initially called Fernbourne. Constructed of cypress pine supplied from the Trafalgar Vale sawmill, it was a large and flamboyant house with 14 rooms on three levels, designed to impress. The ground floor comprised drawing room, dining room, breakfast room, study, bathroom, pantries and wide entrance hall. From this hall a substantial timber staircase led to the first floor and the four principal bedrooms, all of which opened off a central hallway and onto wide, encircling verandahs with magnificent views of the surrounding country and out to Waterloo Bay and Moreton Bay beyond. Another staircase led from the first floor hall to two well-ventilated attic bedrooms. It is not clear whether any sections of the earlier house were incorporated into the new structure. In April 1889, architect Claude William Chambers had called tenders for alterations and additions in wood to a villa residence at Cleveland, and this is thought to refer to Fernbourne. Physical evidence suggests that the earlier kitchen wing was retained, but that the main part of the house was completely rebuilt.

In 1889, Fernbourne sat in a substantial garden of approximately 4.5 acres (1.8 hectares), which had been laid out in the mid-1870s in association with the first Burnett residence. The garden contained an established orchard and vineyard, flower beds, kitchen garden, ornamental shrubs and trees, bushhouses with ferns, orchids and palms, and several fountains of stone and rock work. One of the most substantial and aesthetically pleasing in a district renowned for its fine gardens, the Fernbourne garden was watered from a bore 100 feet (30 m) deep, which fed a large tank on a stand 80 feet (24 m) high, creating sufficient pressure to feed the baths and taps in the house and kitchen, as well as to operate the fountains. Within the grounds were the stabling, outhouses and a kitchen, all of which may have dated to pre-1889.

Fernbourne was built during the wave of boom-time investment and speculation which characterised the late 1880s, but in 1891, as the boom burst and the credit squeeze tightened, Burnett was declared insolvent. His fine new house, together with its grounds of just over 4.5 acres, was put up for auction in October 1891. The house, and approximately 4.5 surrounding acres, was sold in 1891 for £2,000.

Title was transferred a month later to Edward Robert Drury, general manager of the Queensland National Bank Ltd. When the Burnett family left Fernbourne c. 1891, they erected a smaller house on the eastern side of the railway line at Wellington Point, still on part of their original Trafalgar Vale estate and near the sawmill. This, their third home in the Wellington Point area, they also named Fernbourne, and it is likely that the first Fernbourne was renamed Whepstead at this time - certainly it had acquired this name by 1909, when the house was up for sale.

Despite the insolvency, the Burnett family continued operation of the Trafalgar Vale sawmill until c. 1899, when fire may have destroyed the mill. From 1899 to 1913, Gilbert Burnett, with his substantial knowledge of timbers and sawmilling, held a government position as a Ranger of Crown Lands in the Brisbane and Ipswich districts. He died at the second Fernbourne in 1925, and his name and those of his children are perpetuated in the names of the streets surrounding Whepstead.

After the Burnett family left the first Fernbourne (now Whepstead), there followed a succession of owners and lessees. In the late 1890s the house was occupied by James Vincent Chataway, Minister for Public Lands and Agriculture 1898–1901. Mrs Emilie O'Connell, widow of Hon. William Henry Bligh O'Connell, Secretary for Public Lands from 1899 until his death in 1903, appears to have occupied Whepstead from c. 1903 until it was purchased by pastoralist Edgar Gustav Parnell in 1911. The Parnell family resided at Whepstead until the mid-1930s, and reportedly made some changes to the grounds.

In 1943 Matron Ethel Dolley purchased the house and converted it into the Bay View Private Hospital. The grounds remained largely unaltered, but the house was sheathed in fibro, with louvre windows along the verandahs. A toilet block was erected post-1945. The property remained a hospital until 1973, when it reverted to a private residence. In 1977 the remaining land around Whepstead was subdivided, and the house on 5050 square metres was sold and refurbished as a restaurant. A number of owners since have maintained Whepstead as a restaurant and function centre.

The smaller c. 1891 Fernbourne was burned down in September 2012.

== Description ==
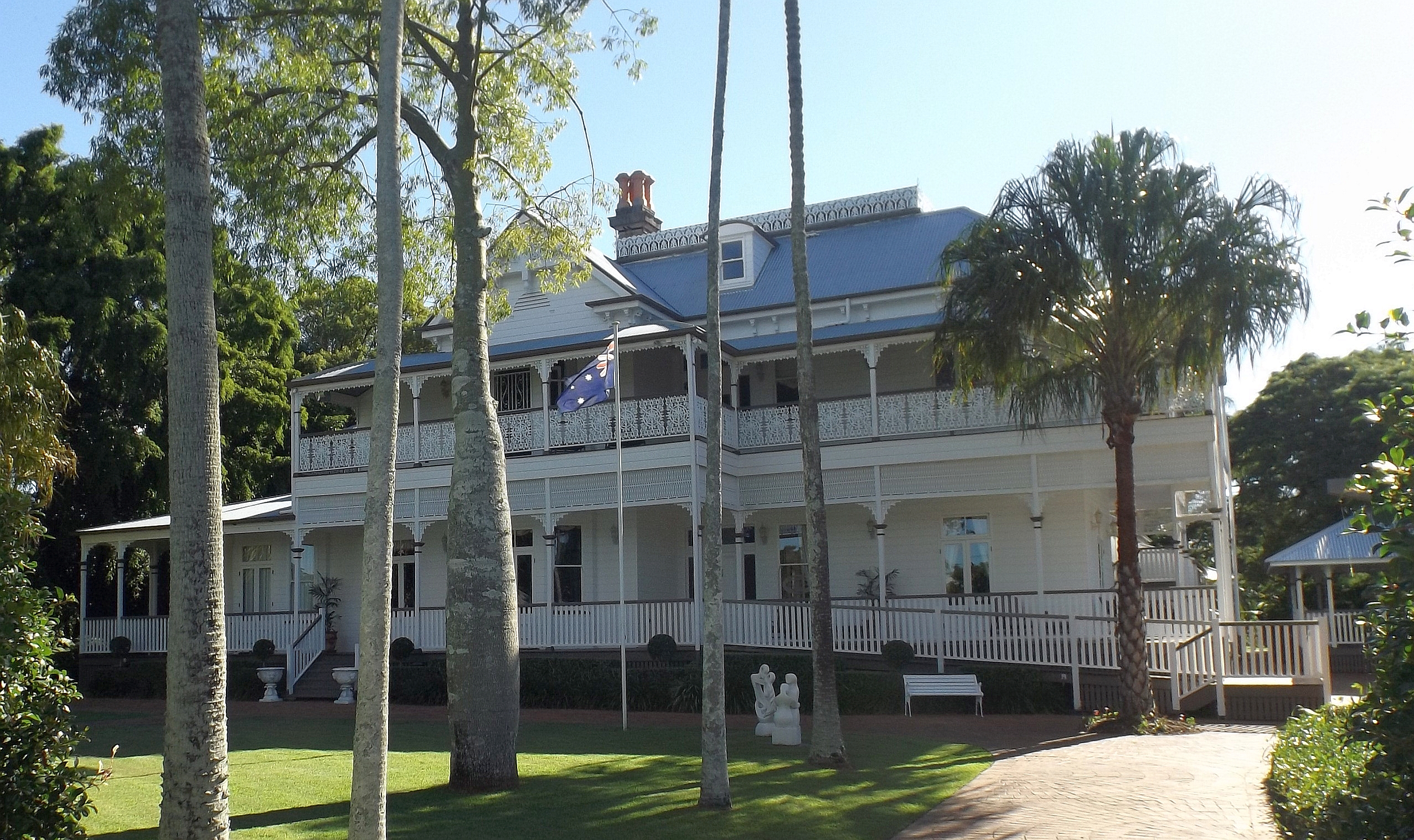
Rear of the building, 2015

Whepstead is a large, two-storey with attic, chamferboard building sited on the crest of a low hill and surrounded by established gardens and mature trees, such as camphor laurels, palms and fig trees – including a large, very old Moreton Bay fig tree on the adjoining property, which spreads over the southeast corner of the present Whepstead grounds, and is an integral element of the garden setting. Whepstead and its surviving grounds is a prominent landmark along the principal road to Wellington Point, and the second level of the house commands fine views of Waterloo Bay and Moreton Bay, and a 360 degree view of the surrounding landscape.

The house has a corrugated iron hipped roof with projecting gables and a central flat section surrounded by cast iron balustrade. The gables surmount bays to the east and south elevations. The building sits on timber stumps and is encircled by verandahs.

The roof has dormer windows with rounded gables and twisted terracotta chimney flues. The gables have cast iron infill panels with decorative timber work, including arched vents and brackets to the eaves. The verandahs have concave corrugated iron roofs, with the first floor having cast iron brackets, valance and balustrade and the ground floor having cast iron brackets, lattice valance panels and timber batten balustrade with sections of the ceiling being boarded and panelled.

The verandahs to the south have been enclosed to form a glassed in function room on the ground floor and access to additions which include toilets and store rooms. The ground floor verandah to the west has been enclosed as a corridor with the southern end featuring leadlight windows and being used as a function room.

A single-storeyed kitchen and service wing is attached to the northwest. This structure has a corrugated iron hipped roof with concave roofed verandahs which have been enclosed or screened for storage space.

French doors with fanlights open onto the verandahs. The foyer has a single panelled door with sidelights and fanlight and a carved timber staircase with turned balustrade. An arch leads to a central hallway with dining rooms and a lounge to either side. The lounge has an elaborate marble and carved timber fireplace, a timber bar has been installed and the walls have been papered. The east dining room has a marble fireplace and the south wall has been removed with the enclosed function room having a lower metal ceiling. Walls are of single skin vertically jointed boards, interior doors have fanlights and floors have been carpeted.

The first floor consists of an east banquet room with a marble fireplace and the rest of the floor has been opened up into one large function space. A steep carved timber staircase leads from the foyer area to the two attic rooms and central corridor. A ladder from this corridor provides access to the flat roof above via a metal hatch.

The grounds include a fenced in-ground concrete swimming pool and children's playground to the north and a timber gazebo with a sheet metal roof to the northeast. Extensive brick paving and landscaping surround the building with timber stages located at the southeast and west and a fountain to the east.

== Heritage listing ==
Whepstead was listed on the Queensland Heritage Register on 21 October 1992 having satisfied the following criteria.

The place is important in demonstrating the evolution or pattern of Queensland's history.

Whepstead, erected in 1889, is important in illustrating the pattern of Queensland's history, being a rare surviving example of 1880s boom era architecture in the Redlands district, and a conscious expression of the confidence and pride in accomplishment engendered during that era.

The place demonstrates rare, uncommon or endangered aspects of Queensland's cultural heritage.

Whepstead, erected in 1889, is important in illustrating the pattern of Queensland's history, being a rare surviving example of 1880s boom era architecture in the Redlands district, and a conscious expression of the confidence and pride in accomplishment engendered during that era.

The place has potential to yield information that will contribute to an understanding of Queensland's history.

The grounds may contain remnant evidence of the original 1870s-1880s layout and plantings, with potential to reveal important information about domestic horticulture and garden layouts at this period.

The place is important in demonstrating the principal characteristics of a particular class of cultural places.

Some first floor internal walls have been removed, but the place remains sufficiently intact to be of importance in illustrating the principal characteristics of a large, ornate, timber residence of three levels [two storeys and a substantial attic]. The house is also a good example of the early work of important Brisbane architect CW Chambers.

The place is important because of its aesthetic significance.

The aesthetically pleasing exterior of Whepstead, in its setting of large, mature trees and garden, makes a strong contribution to the Wellington Point townscape, and internally, the aesthetic quality and craftsmanship of the carved timber stair and joinery are of note. The fine views from and to the place are also of aesthetic importance.

The place has a strong or special association with a particular community or cultural group for social, cultural or spiritual reasons.

The place has had an historical landmark quality in Brisbane's southern bayside suburbs for well over a century, which is valued by the local and Brisbane community as part of a unique heritage.

The place has a special association with the life or work of a particular person, group or organisation of importance in Queensland's history.

Whepstead house [1889] and grounds [established mid-1870s] have a strong association with Gilbert Burnett and his important role in the development of Wellington Point in the last quarter of the 19th century.
