= Wellington Point State High School =

Secondary school in Queensland, Australia

Coordinates: 27°29′29″S 153°13′46.3″E

Information
- Motto: Aim High
- Established: 1988
- Principal: Dr Robyn Burton-Ree
- Enrollment: 857 (2023)
- Mascot: Osprey
- Website: https://wellingtonpointshs.eq.edu.au/

Wellington Point State High School is a public, co-educational, secondary school, located in the Redland City suburb of Wellington Point, in Queensland, Australia. It is administered by the Department of Education, with an enrolment of 857 students and a teaching staff of 74, as of 2023. The school serves students from Year 7 to Year 12.

== History ==
The school had been in development since at least May 1985, with the land being acquired by the Department of Education in November 1985. The school opened on 25 January 1988, along with Redlands College.

Female students were given the option to wear skorts instead of the traditional skirts in 2019, when roughly 40% of Queensland’s state schools still only allowed skirts and dresses to be worn.

Also in 2019, the school officially created a sister school agreement with Suzuka High School, following a proposal made in 2017.

== Facilities ==
Wellington Point State High School has a fully functional theatre (The Osprey Theatre) and a Multi-Purpose Shelter (MPS) for assemblies and sporting activities. The school has developed a number of unique programs to encourage the steady educational development of students. Such a program is 'The Acceleration Program', which allows gifted year 10 students to undertake year 11 subjects, giving the student the option of beginning a tertiary course in their senior year.

== Notable staff ==
- Mikayla Hinkley, Australian cricket player.

== See also ==
- List of Schools in Greater Brisbane
