= Redlands College =

Location
- Wellington Point, Brisbane, Queensland; Australia; 27°29′33″S 153°14′02″E

Information
- Type: Independent co-educational primary and secondary day school
- Motto: Christ Centred Excellence
- Religious affiliation: Churches of Christ in Australia
- Denomination: Non-denominational Christian
- Established: 1988; 38 years ago
- Principal: Andrew Johnson
- Area: 8 hectares (20 acres)
- Colours: Blue, navy, gold
- Affiliations: Metropolitan East School Sport
- Website: www.redlands.qld.edu.au

Redlands College is an independent non-denominational Christian co-educational primary and secondary day school, located in the Redland City suburb of Wellington Point, Queensland, Australia. The college caters for approximately 1,300 students from P to Year 12 and is operated by an association formed by members of the Churches of Christ in Australia.

== History ==
Redlands College first opened in February 1988 with 91 students in Years 1–8, housed in demountable buildings. The college commenced its permanent building program in its first year, with facilities for primary and secondary students and administration.

In 2007 the college was divided into three separate yet integrated schools - the Junior School (Prep to Year 5), the Middle School (Years 6–9) and the Senior School (Years 10–12).

== Principals ==
Allan Todd founded Redlands College in 1988 and faithfully served the college as Headmaster until the end of 2013. In 2014 Mark Bensley was appointed Principal and led the college for three years until the close of 2016. Andrew Johnson was appointed Principal in 2017 and continues to serve in this role.

== Facilities ==
Redlands College is situated on an eight-hectare (twenty-acre) site at Wellington Point. The facilities are architecturally designed for the Queensland climate. The college has a variety of specialised facilities to meet the needs of Junior, Middle and Senior school students. In addition, a number of larger facilities are shared by the whole school community, including a modern sports centre, a 25-metre (82 ft) heated indoor swimming pool, three ovals, a large resource library, a number of computer labs, an expressive arts building, science centre and multi-purpose hall.

== Technology ==
Redlands College was an early adopter of the iPad Program as a teaching and learning tool; launched in 2011. In late 2011 Redlands College became an Apple Distinguished School and in 2017 fulfilled the requirements to become an accredited eSmart School with The Alannah and Madeline Foundation.

== Curriculum ==
From Prep to Grade 12, Redlands College's curriculum includes mandatory religious studies classes.

In Prep to Year 2 the focus is on language and literacy skills and mathematics. In Years 3 to 5, units of work may take a language focus or be developed around a Science or Humanities and Social Science concept or topic. ICT is integrated in Junior School classrooms.

In Middle School Year 6 and 7 students undertake a range of compulsory subjects which enable students to gain grounding in essential areas as well as experiencing the range of elective subjects the college offers. In Years 8 and 9, students can select from a range of specialist elective subjects. This helps them explore the options in preparation for Senior School.

The Senior School (Years 10 to 12) curriculum provides an extensive range of subjects. In Years 11 and 12, students may pursue an academic program or a Vocational Education & Training program.

== Co-curricular ==
Students (aged 14 and over) may choose to participate in The Duke of Edinburgh's Award, Bronze, Silver and Gold Awards.

The Redlands College Performance Music program, serving the Junior, Middle and Senior Schools comprises instrumental and vocal tuition; and instrumental and choral ensembles.

Redlands College is a part of the Bayside District Sports association, which is a member of Metropolitan East School Sport.

== Criticism ==
In 2014, Redlands College was criticised for requesting the transfer of practicum teachers on the basis of them wearing hijabs.

In 2016, a former second grade teacher was jailed as a convicted pedophile; and a senator condemned the school for threatening a parent with a lawsuit, who requested detailed explanations as to why a year two teacher suddenly left the school. The staff member in question had resigned from the college prior to the college being informed of the allegations, which were already in the hands of the police. In 2017 a Report from the Committee of Privileges was entered into Hansard.

== See also ==
- List of schools in Queensland
- Churches of Christ in Australia
