= Lota railway station =

Railway station in Queensland, Australia

Lota
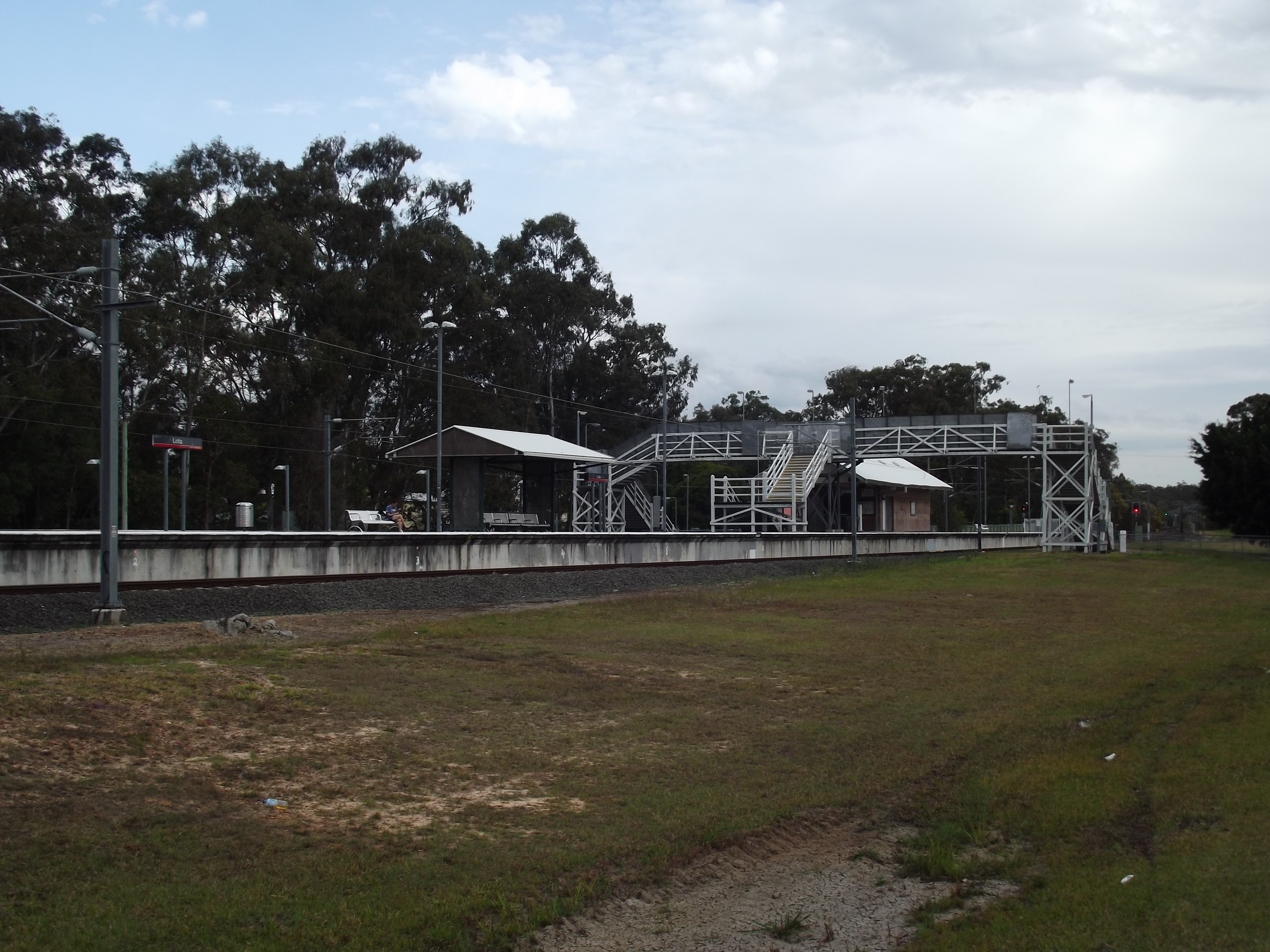
- Southbound view of Platform 2, August 2012

General information
- Location: Railway Terrace, Lota
- Coordinates: 27°28′12″S 153°11′19″E
- Owner: Queensland Rail
- Operator: Queensland Rail
- Line: T4 Cleveland
- Distance: 25.87 kilometres from Central
- Platforms: 2 (1 island)
- Tracks: 2

Construction
- Structure type: Ground
- Parking: 20 bays
- Cycle facilities: Yes
- Accessible: Yes

Other information
- Station code: 600269 (platform 1); 600270 (platform 2)
- Fare zone: Zone 2
- Website: Translink

History
- Opened: 1889
- Rebuilt: 1995

Services
Preceding station	Queensland Rail	Following station
Manly towards Shorncliffe via Roma Street	T4 Cleveland line	Thorneside towards Cleveland
Location

Lota is a railway station operated by Queensland Rail on the Cleveland line. It opened in 1889 and serves the Brisbane suburb of Lota. It is a ground level station, featuring one island platform with two faces.

== History ==
In 1889, the Cleveland line was extended from Manly to the original Cleveland station.

On 1 November 1960, Lota became the terminus of the line when it was curtailed. The line from Lota to Cleveland was rebuilt, and reopened on a new alignment to Thorneside on 25 September 1982 and Cleveland on 24 October 1987.

In 1995, the timber building was replaced by a brick structure and a crossing loop added. In 2006 the wooden rail bridge leading to the station from the north was replaced with a concrete bridge.

== Services ==
Lota is served by Cleveland line services from Shorncliffe, Northgate, Doomben and Bowen Hills to Cleveland.

== Platforms and services ==
Lota platform arrangement
Platform	Line	Destination	Notes
1	T4 Cleveland	Cleveland	Peak hours only
2	T4 Cleveland	Cleveland, Roma Street (to Shorncliffe line)	
