= Wellington Point, Queensland =

Wellington Point
- Suburb
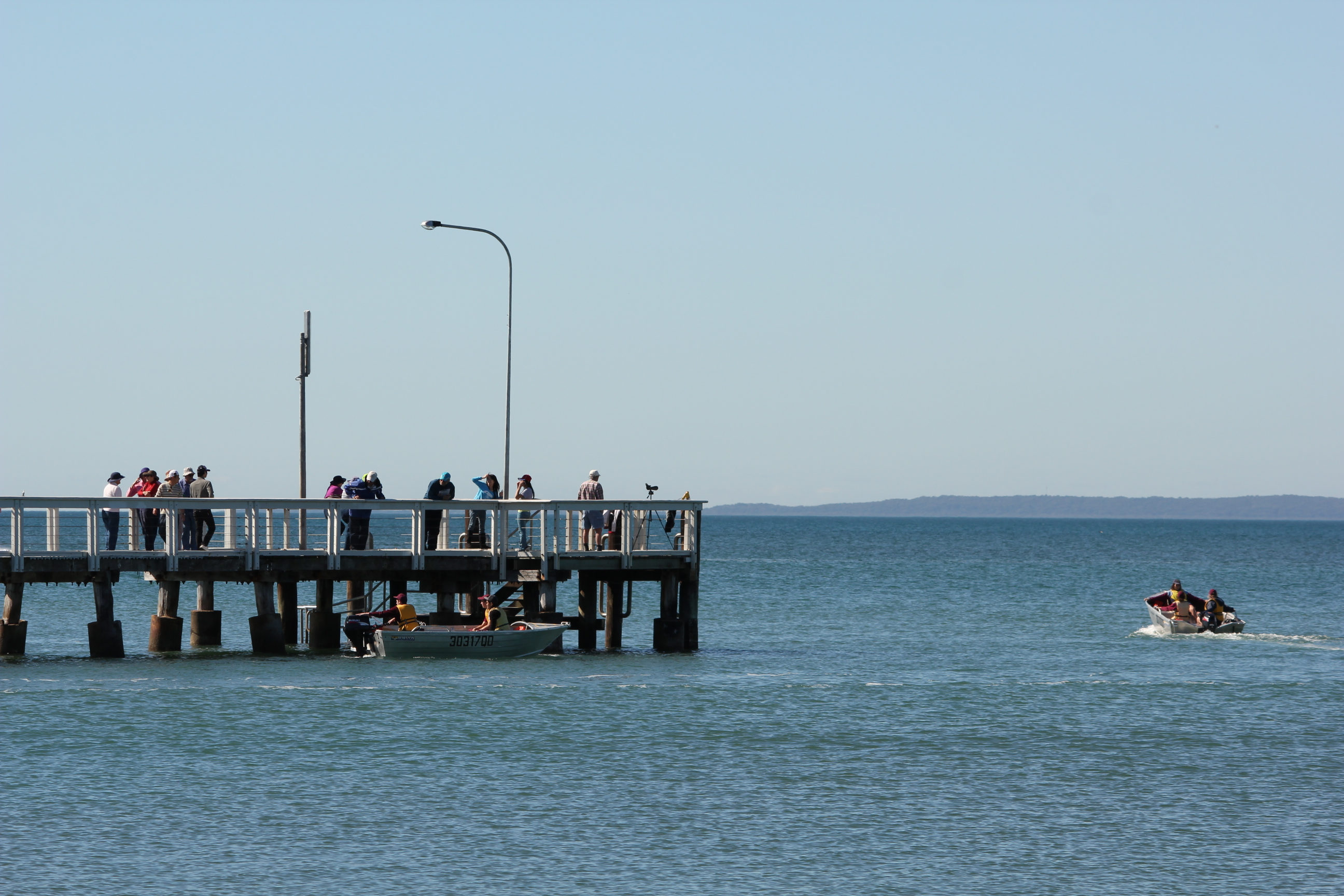
- Wellington Point jetty

- Interactive map of Wellington Point
- Coordinates: 27.4980°S 153.2358°E
- Country: Australia
- State: Queensland
- City: Redland City
- Location: 8.2 km (5.1 mi) NW of Cleveland; 25.5 km (15.8 mi) E of Brisbane CBD

Government
  - State electorate: Oodgeroo
  - Federal division: Bowman

Area
  - Total: 12.7 km^{2} (4.9 sq mi)

Population
  - Total: 12,661 (2021 census)
  - Density: 997/km^{2} (2,582/sq mi)
- Time zone: UTC+10:00 (AEST)
- Postcode: 4160
Suburbs around Wellington Point
Moreton Bay	Moreton Bay	Moreton Bay
Birkdale	Wellington Point	Ormiston
Birkdale	Alexandra Hills	Ormiston

Wellington Point is a residential coastal locality in the City of Redland, Queensland, Australia. It is a popular seaside destination within the Brisbane metropolitan area and is notable for a popular walk along a sandbar to King Island which emerges at low tide. In the 2021 census, Wellington Point had a population of 12,661 people.

== Geography ==
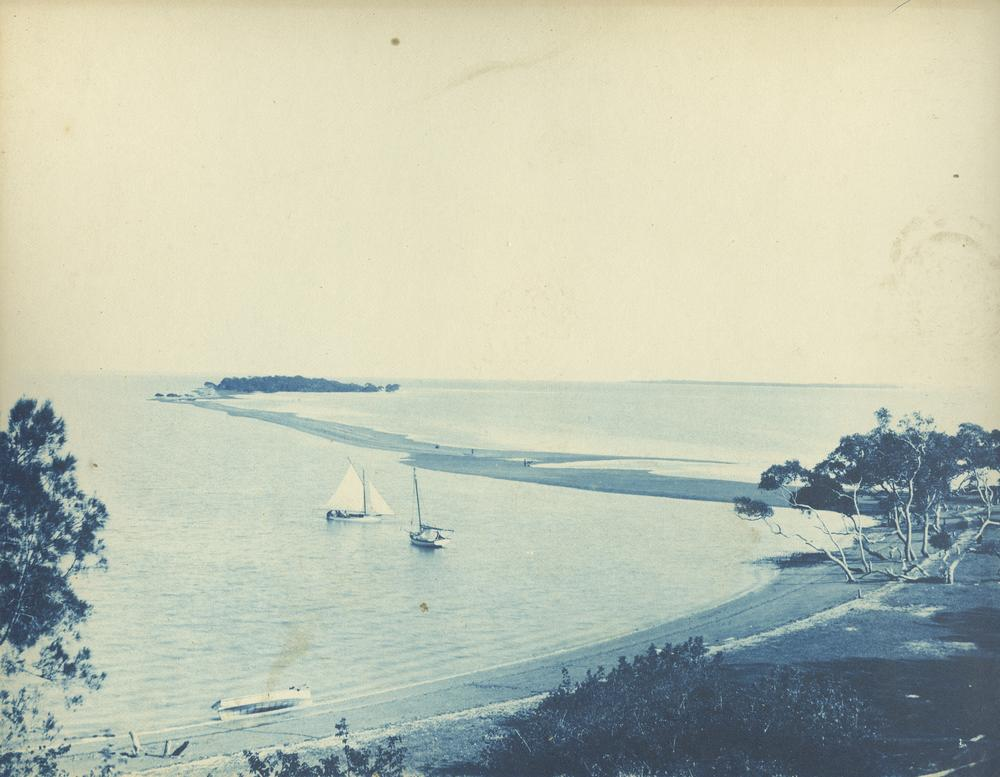
Sandbar walk to King Island at low tide

Wellington Point is 25.5 kilometres (15.8 mi) east of Brisbane, the capital of Queensland.

The locality is bounded to the north-west, north, and north-east by Moreton Bay and to the east and south-east by Hilliards Creek.

The locality has a number of coastal features (clockwise from north-west):

- Waterloo Bay, a side bay of Moreton Bay (27.4759°S 153.2221°E)
- Wellington Point, a headland (27.4658°S 153.2402°E)
- King Island, also known as Erobin, a 2-hectare (4.9-acre) marina island (27.4570°S 153.2338°E) north of the headland

The locality derives its name from the headland called Wellington Point which extends prominently into Moreton Bay.

At low tide, it is possible to walk from the headland to King Island along a sandbar.

== History ==
The people of the Quandamooka lived in the Redlands long before white settlement. Food was plentiful and skillfully hunted, fished and collected. Tribes of the Yuggera language group inhabited the whole area, with the tribe inhabiting the mainland coastal strip stretching from Redland Bay to the mouth of the Brisbane River being called the Koobenpul.

The headland Wellington Point was named by surveyors Robert Dixon and James Warner in 1842 after the Duke of Wellington who led the army of the United Kingdom in the Battle of Waterloo in 1815. The bay formed to the west of Wellington Point was named Waterloo Bay.

The first European settlers arrived in Wellington Point in the mid-1860s after the first land sales of 1864 at which one of the big purchasers was Thomas Lodge Murray-Prior. Another purchaser was Captain Louis Hope, who built Ormiston House and established a major sugar plantation and milling operation in Ormiston.

Around 1869, Gilbert Burnett come to the district, taking over Captain Louis Hope's sugar mill before purchasing land at Wellington Point, where he grew sugarcane and erected a sugar mill. In 1889, he built the two-storey house Fernbourne in Fernbourne Road (the third house he built by this name in the district).

Early industries included growing sugar cane, timber cutting, fruit and vegetable farming and fishing. (Of these the only surviving industry of any significance is fruit and vegetable farming though rapidly increasing urbanisation has reduced this industry to very low levels.)

The first Wellington Point Hotel was built about 1882, but was demolished in 1972 to be rebuilt as a hotel-motel.

In 1887, Gilbert Burnett subdivided more of his Wellington Point holdings, especially around the railway station. Edith, Alice and Matilda Streets were laid out and named after three of Burnett's daughters.

Wellington Point State School opened on 9 May 1887.

The Wellington Point Methodist Church was opened on Easter Sunday (1 April) in 1888.

In April 1888, the headland area was established as recreational reserve known as the Wellington Point Reserve.

Another house called Fernbourne was constructed in 1889, but was renamed Whepstead Manor in 1900.

The Cleveland railway line was built from Brisbane, Queensland to Cleveland, Queensland passing through Wellington Point, which was served by:

- Badgen railway station, now dismantled (27.4928°S 153.2299°E)
- Wellington Point railway station (27.4944°S 153.2420°E)

The line opened on 1 November 1889. This led to greater travel to Wellington Point and the opening up of yet more land. The line was closed in 1960 due to lack of use. On 26 July 1986, the railway line re-opened to Wellington Point with Wellington Point railway station being re-established.

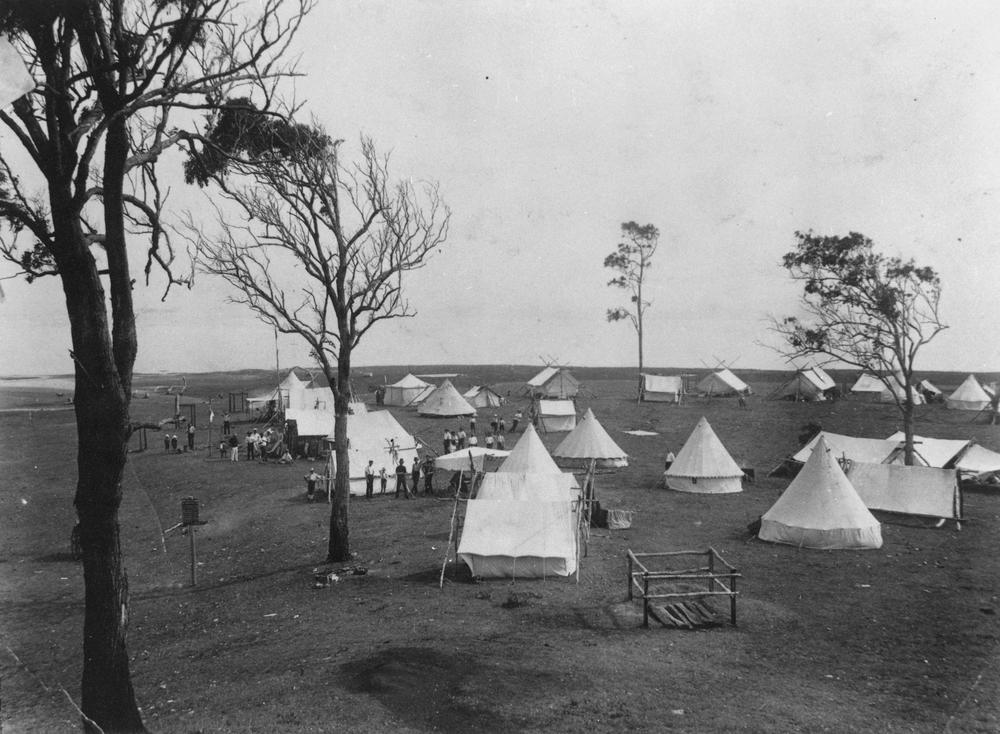
Tents on the foreshore at Wellington Point, around 1911

By 1893, the population of the area was 260 most involved in the primary sector and the service sector and by 1897 the end of Wellington Point was set aside as a recreation reserve.

The Point's popularity continued to grow with special fruit trains run to the area in 1906 to sample the strawberries and to visit the gardens and vineyards and by 1911 retirees and commuters began to move into the area and more housing blocks were set aside.

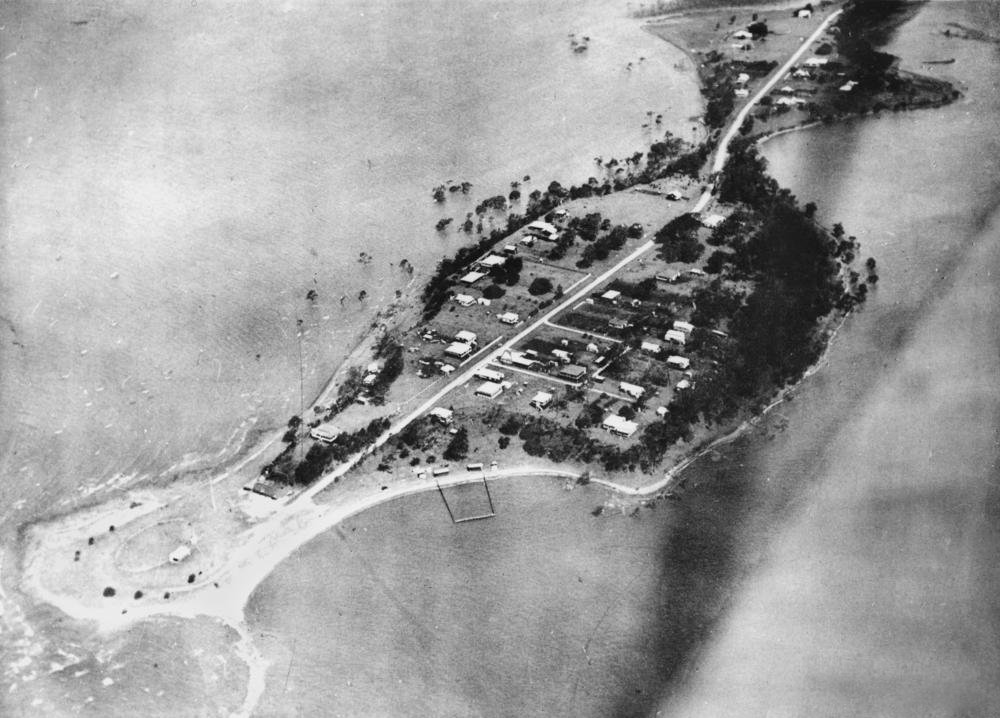
Aerial view of resorts at Wellington Point, 1929

Banyan figs were planted at the point in 1924, by 1925 the first kiosk at the point was established and in 1927 the Moreton Bay figs were planted giving the point many of its most iconic features.

Whilst the Great Depression in the late 20s and 30s was a personal tragedy for many, it was also a time of work creation and the development of infrastructure. An interesting development at the point was the drilling for oil which began in 1931. Electricity was first provided in the area in 1931 and the Wellington Point Jetty was completed in 1937.

The Second World War had a significant effect on Wellington Point and arguably the most obvious consequence was the established United States Naval Anti-Aircraft Training School during 1943 and 1944 when 1500 US forces camped there. The camp was an Anti-Aircraft (A-A) gunnery school and conducted shooting and bombing practice, sometimes using King Island as the target.

After the war, the pace of life slowed but change was coming. In 1959, a chemist, doctor's surgery, butcher, garage and fish shop were set up and with the arrival of reticulated water in 1969, farmland began to be sub-divided for house blocks.

In 1983, the Redland Cricketers Club was opened.

Wellington Point State High School opened on 25 January 1988.

Redlands College was established on 1 February 1988 by an association of members of the Churches of Christ in Australia.

On 4 September 2012, the historic Fernbourne House was destroyed by fire. It was a two-storey building built in 1889 by pioneer Gilbert Burnett. It was the third house he had built with that name; the first being on the site of the present Whepstead Manor.

In July 2020, Brisbane Airport opened its new parallel runway, causing a significant increase in air traffic over Wellington Point. Depending on wind conditions, Wellington Point experiences 110+ flights per day, with a monthly average of 64. This has led to some community anger, led by the federal member for Bowman, Henry Pike.

== Demographics ==
In the 2011 census, Wellington Point recorded a population of 11,787 people, 50.9% female and 49.1% male. The median age of the Wellington Point population was 39 years, 2 years above the national median of 37. 73.1% of people living in Wellington Point were born in Australia. The other top responses for country of birth were England 7.7%, New Zealand 5.1%, South Africa 1.8%, Scotland 1.2%, Netherlands 0.5%. 90.8% of people spoke only English at home; the next most common languages were 0.5% German, 0.5% Italian, 0.4% Afrikaans, 0.4% Punjabi, 0.3% Finnish.

In the 2016 census, Wellington Point had a population of 12,350 people.

In the 2021 census, Wellington Point had a population of 12,661 people.

== Heritage listings ==
Wellington Point has a number of heritage-listed sites, including:

- 2A Main Road: Wellington Point Reserve
- 563 Main Road: Whepstead

== Significant features ==
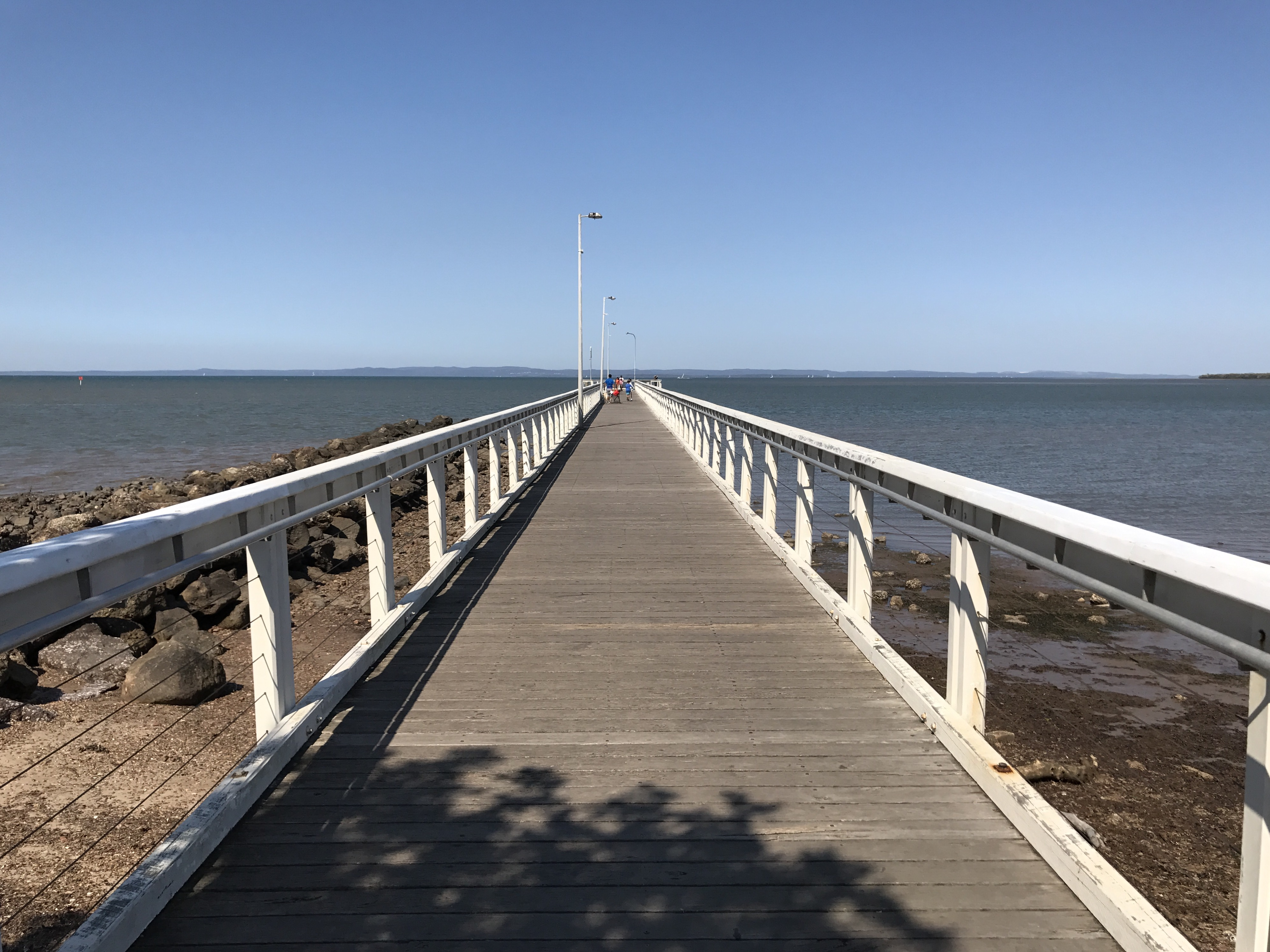
Wellington Point Jetty

Significant features include the point, King Island (which is joined to the point at low tide by a natural sand causeway), Redlands Sporting Club, Sovereign Waters (a lakeside housing development), and Whepstead Manor (a significant historical residence) and a shopping and restaurant precinct which contains the Wellington Point Clock Tower.

== Education ==
Wellington Point State School is a government primary (Prep–6) school for boys and girls at 476 Main Road (27.4910°S 153.2396°E). In 2017, the school had an enrolment of 546 students with 44 teachers (33 full-time equivalent) and 22 non-teaching staff (13 full-time equivalent). It includes a special education program.

Wellington Point State High School is a government secondary (7–12) school for boys and girls at 2-36 Badgen Road (27.4910°S 153.2288°E). In 2017, the school had an enrolment of 914 students with 80 teachers (76 full-time equivalent) and 37 non-teaching staff (24 full-time equivalent). It includes a special education program.

Redlands College is a private primary and secondary (Prep–12) school for boys and girls at 38 Anson Road (27.4926°S 153.2327°E). In 2017, the school had an enrolment of 1,319 students with 109 teachers (99 full-time equivalent) and 82 non-teaching staff (58 full-time equivalent).

== Amenities ==
The Redland City Council operates a mobile library service which visits Main Road.

Wellington Point Jetty is off Main Road on at eastern side of Wellington Point extending into Moreton Bay (27.4661°S 153.2413°E). There are two boat ramps on Main Road, to the north (27.4659°S 153.2413°E) and the south (27.4665°S 153.2412°E) of Wellington Point Jetty providing boating access to Moreton Bay. The jetty and the boat ramps are managed by the Redland City Council.

There is a boat ramp at Bligh St into Hilliards Creek (27.4912°S 153.2488°E). It is managed by the Redlands City.

There are a number of parks in suburb:

- Apex Park (27.5080°S 153.2465°E)
- Ashley Court Park (27.4991°S 153.2347°E)
- Brock Park (27.5040°S 153.2327°E)
- Doug Tiller Reserve (27.5152°S 153.2426°E)
- EGW Wood Sportsfield (27.4888°S 153.2347°E)
- Geoff Skinner Wetlands Reserve (27.4856°S 153.2478°E)
- Hilliards Creek Park (27.4994°S 153.2482°E)
- Laurance Court Park (27.5009°S 153.2424°E)
- Mcdonald Reserve (27.5165°S 153.2382°E)
- Ormiston Manor Park (27.5066°S 153.2529°E)
- Schonrock Street Park (27.5032°S 153.2419°E)
- Tarradarrapin Wetlands (27.5048°S 153.2263°E)
- Three Paddocks Park (27.4858°S 153.2284°E)
- Wellington Point Reserve (27.4669°S 153.2408°E)
- Whepstead Ave Park (27.4950°S 153.2351°E)

== Attractions ==
Harry Atkinson Reef is a 92-hectare (230-acre) artificial reef in the Moreton Bay Marine Park (27.4069°S 153.3083°E).

== Public transport ==
A railway service to Brisbane and other suburbs on the line between Brisbane and Cleveland, Queensland is accessed at the Wellington Point railway station.
