= Electoral results for the district of Warwick =

Queensland, Australia, district election results

This is a list of electoral results for the electoral district of Warwick in Queensland state elections.

== Members for Warwick ==
| Member | Party | Term |
|---|---|---|
| St. George Richard Gore | | 1860–1862 |
| John Gore Jones | | 1862–1863 |
| Arnold Wienholt, Sr. | | 1863–1867 |
| George Clark | | 1867–1868 |
| Edmond Thornton | | 1868–1870 |
| James Morgan | | 1870–1871 |
| Charles Clark | | 1871–1873 |
| James Morgan | | 1873–1878 |
| Jacob Horwitz | Liberal | 1878–1887 |
| Arthur Morgan | Independent | 1887–1890 |
| Opposition | 1890–1896 | |
| Thomas Joseph Byrnes | Ministerial | 1896–1898 |
| Arthur Morgan | Ministerial | 1898–1903 |
| Arthur Morgan | Liberal | 1903–1906 |
| Thomas O'Sullivan | Liberal | 1906–1907 |
| Thomas O'Sullivan | Kidstonites | 1907–1908 |
| George Powell Barnes | Farmers' Rep. | 1908–1909 |
| George Powell Barnes | Liberal | 1909–1917 |
| George Powell Barnes | National | 1917–1922 |
| George Powell Barnes | United | 1922–1925 |
| George Powell Barnes | Country and Progressive National | 1925–1935 |
| John Healy | Labor | 1935–1947 |
| Otto Madsen | Country | 1947–1963 |
| David Cory | Country | 1963–1975 |
| David Cory | National Country | 1975–1977 |
| Des Booth | National Country | 1977–1982 |
| Des Booth | National | 1982–1992 |
| Lawrence Springborg | National | 1992–2001 |

== Election results ==
=== Elections in the 1990s ===
1998 Queensland state election: Warwick
| Party | Candidate | Votes | % | ±% |
|---|---|---|---|---|
| National | Lawrence Springborg | 9,443 | 45.86 | −20.96 |
| One Nation | Joan White | 6,242 | 30.32 | +30.32 |
| Labor | Jeffrey Singleton | 4,091 | 19.87 | −8.02 |
| Greens | Kim Olsen | 814 | 3.95 | −1.34 |
| Total formal votes | | 20,590 | 98.66 | −0.08 |
| Informal votes | | 280 | 1.34 | +0.08 |
| Turnout | | 20,870 | 94.30 | +0.70 |
Two-candidate-preferred result
| National | Lawrence Springborg | 11,628 | 61.85 | −7.73 |
| One Nation | Joan White | 7,172 | 38.15 | +38.15 |
| National hold | | Swing | −7.73 | |

1995 Queensland state election: Warwick
| Party | Candidate | Votes | % | ±% |
|---|---|---|---|---|
| National | Lawrence Springborg | 13,393 | 66.82 | +10.77 |
| Labor | Michael Bathersby | 5,590 | 27.89 | −9.18 |
| Greens | Sarah Moles | 1,061 | 5.29 | +5.29 |
| Total formal votes | | 20,044 | 98.74 | +0.61 |
| Informal votes | | 256 | 1.26 | −0.61 |
| Turnout | | 20,300 | 93.60 | +0.07 |
Two-party-preferred result
| National | Lawrence Springborg | 13,792 | 69.58 | +8.15 |
| Labor | Michael Bathersby | 6,031 | 30.42 | −8.15 |
| National hold | | Swing | +8.15 | |

1992 Queensland state election: Warwick
| Party | Candidate | Votes | % | ±% |
|---|---|---|---|---|
| National | Lawrence Springborg | 11,287 | 56.1 | +15.5 |
| Labor | Michael Bathersby | 7,464 | 37.1 | +6.4 |
| Liberal | Ruth Buchanan | 1,386 | 6.9 | −8.0 |
| Total formal votes | | 20,137 | 98.1 | |
| Informal votes | | 384 | 1.9 | |
| Turnout | | 20,521 | 93.5 | |
Two-party-preferred result
| National | Lawrence Springborg | 12,236 | 61.4 | +0.4 |
| Labor | Michael Bathersby | 7,683 | 38.6 | −0.4 |
| National hold | | Swing | +0.4 | |

=== Elections in the 1980s ===
1989 Queensland state election: Warwick
| Party | Candidate | Votes | % | ±% |
|---|---|---|---|---|
| National | Des Booth | 4,945 | 41.0 | −31.1 |
| Labor | Bev Brennan | 3,399 | 28.2 | +0.3 |
| Liberal | Peter Beatty | 2,032 | 16.9 | +16.9 |
| Independent | Bev Shelley | 1,682 | 13.9 | +13.9 |
| Total formal votes | | 12,058 | 97.9 | −0.3 |
| Informal votes | | 254 | 2.1 | +0.3 |
| Turnout | | 12,312 | 92.6 | −0.9 |
Two-party-preferred result
| National | Des Booth | 7,723 | 64.0 | −8.1 |
| Labor | Bev Brennan | 4,335 | 36.0 | +8.1 |
| National hold | | Swing | −8.1 | |

1986 Queensland state election: Warwick
| Party | Candidate | Votes | % | ±% |
|---|---|---|---|---|
| National | Des Booth | 8,158 | 72.1 | +1.5 |
| Labor | Bev Brennan | 3,151 | 27.9 | −1.5 |
| Total formal votes | | 11,309 | 98.2 | −0.1 |
| Informal votes | | 209 | 1.8 | +0.1 |
| Turnout | | 11,518 | 93.5 | −0.3 |
| National hold | | Swing | +1.5 | |

1983 Queensland state election: Warwick
| Party | Candidate | Votes | % | ±% |
|---|---|---|---|---|
| National | Des Booth | 6,921 | 67.9 | +3.5 |
| Labor | Mary Hill | 3,278 | 32.1 | +3.1 |
| Total formal votes | | 10,199 | 98.3 | −0.7 |
| Informal votes | | 172 | 1.7 | +0.7 |
| Turnout | | 10,371 | 93.8 | +2.1 |
| National hold | | Swing | +0.2 | |

1980 Queensland state election: Warwick
| Party | Candidate | Votes | % | ±% |
|---|---|---|---|---|
| National | Des Booth | 6,199 | 64.4 | +11.5 |
| Labor | Stephen Fazackerley | 2,790 | 29.0 | +0.5 |
| Democrats | Maria Heyboer | 632 | 6.6 | +6.6 |
| Total formal votes | | 9,621 | 99.0 | +0.1 |
| Informal votes | | 93 | 1.0 | −0.1 |
| Turnout | | 9,714 | 91.7 | −1.5 |
Two-party-preferred result
| National | Des Booth | 6,509 | 67.7 | −1.2 |
| Labor | Stephen Fazackerley | 3,112 | 32.3 | +1.2 |
| National hold | | Swing | −1.2 | |

=== Elections in the 1970s ===
1977 Queensland state election: Warwick
| Party | Candidate | Votes | % | ±% |
|---|---|---|---|---|
| National | Des Booth | 5,013 | 52.9 | −21.9 |
| Labor | Graham Dorman | 2,699 | 28.5 | −3.3 |
| Liberal | Raymond McNamara | 1,764 | 18.6 | +18.6 |
| Total formal votes | | 9,476 | 98.9 | |
| Informal votes | | 102 | 1.1 | |
| Turnout | | 9,578 | 93.2 | |
Two-party-preferred result
| National | Des Booth | 6,530 | 68.9 | −5.9 |
| Labor | Graham Dorman | 2,946 | 31.1 | +5.9 |
| National hold | | Swing | −5.9 | |

1974 Queensland state election: Warwick
| Party | Candidate | Votes | % | ±% |
|---|---|---|---|---|
| National | David Cory | 7,052 | 74.8 | +25.5 |
| Labor | Raymond Lyons | 2,374 | 25.2 | −10.2 |
| Total formal votes | | 9,426 | 98.8 | −0.1 |
| Informal votes | | 112 | 1.2 | +0.1 |
| Turnout | | 9,538 | 91.9 | −3.0 |
| National hold | | Swing | +13.3 | |

1972 Queensland state election: Warwick
| Party | Candidate | Votes | % | ±% |
|---|---|---|---|---|
| Country | David Cory | 4,258 | 49.3 | −4.5 |
| Labor | Raymond Lyons | 3,053 | 35.4 | −2.6 |
| Queensland Labor | Daniel Skehan | 679 | 7.9 | −0.3 |
| Independent | Norman Stuart | 641 | 7.4 | +7.4 |
| Total formal votes | | 8,631 | 98.9 | |
| Informal votes | | 98 | 1.1 | |
| Turnout | | 8,729 | 94.9 | |
Two-party-preferred result
| Country | David Cory | 5,305 | 61.5 | +0.2 |
| Labor | Raymond Lyons | 3,326 | 38.5 | −0.2 |
| Country hold | | Swing | +0.2 | |

=== Elections in the 1960s ===
1969 Queensland state election: Warwick
| Party | Candidate | Votes | % | ±% |
|---|---|---|---|---|
| Country | David Cory | 4,276 | 53.8 | −5.1 |
| Labor | Raymond Lyons | 3,014 | 38.0 | +5.0 |
| Queensland Labor | Daniel Skehan | 650 | 8.2 | +0.1 |
| Total formal votes | | 7,940 | 99.1 | +0.2 |
| Informal votes | | 70 | 0.9 | −0.2 |
| Turnout | | 8,010 | 95.4 | −0.5 |
Two-party-preferred result
| Country | David Cory | 4,805 | 60.5 | −5.0 |
| Labor | Raymond Lyons | 3,135 | 39.5 | +5.0 |
| Country hold | | Swing | −5.0 | |

1966 Queensland state election: Warwick
| Party | Candidate | Votes | % | ±% |
|---|---|---|---|---|
| Country | David Cory | 4,816 | 58.9 | −2.5 |
| Labor | Eric Barrett | 2,701 | 33.0 | +9.0 |
| Queensland Labor | Daniel Skehan | 659 | 8.1 | −6.4 |
| Total formal votes | | 8,176 | 98.9 | +0.1 |
| Informal votes | | 90 | 1.1 | −0.1 |
| Turnout | | 8,266 | 95.9 | +0.1 |
Two-party-preferred result
| Country | David Cory | 5,352 | 65.5 | −7.8 |
| Labor | Eric Barrett | 2,824 | 34.5 | +7.8 |
| Country hold | | Swing | −7.8 | |

1963 Queensland state election: Warwick
| Party | Candidate | Votes | % | ±% |
|---|---|---|---|---|
| Country | Otto Madsen | 5,152 | 61.4 | −2.5 |
| Labor | Reggie Wenham | 2,016 | 24.0 | +2.6 |
| Queensland Labor | Daniel Skehan | 1,217 | 14.5 | −0.2 |
| Total formal votes | | 8,385 | 98.8 | +0.1 |
| Informal votes | | 105 | 1.2 | −0.1 |
| Turnout | | 8,490 | 95.8 | +1.2 |
Two-party-preferred result
| Country | Otto Madsen | 6,143 | 73.3 | |
| Labor | Reggie Wenham | 2,242 | 26.7 | |
| Country hold | | Swing | N/A | |

1960 Queensland state election: Warwick
| Party | Candidate | Votes | % | ±% |
|---|---|---|---|---|
| Country | Otto Madsen | 5,437 | 63.9 | |
| Labor | Reggie Wenham | 1,818 | 21.4 | |
| Queensland Labor | George Campbell | 1,254 | 14.7 | |
| Total formal votes | | 8,509 | 98.7 | |
| Informal votes | | 108 | 1.3 | |
| Turnout | | 8,617 | 94.6 | |
| Country hold | | Swing | | |

=== Elections in the 1950s ===
1957 Queensland state election: Warwick
| Party | Candidate | Votes | % | ±% |
|---|---|---|---|---|
| Country | Otto Madsen | 5,695 | 65.3 | +1.7 |
| Queensland Labor | George Wilkinson | 3,026 | 34.7 | +34.7 |
| Total formal votes | | 8,721 | 98.4 | −0.7 |
| Informal votes | | 142 | 1.6 | +0.7 |
| Turnout | | 8,863 | 95.8 | −0.4 |
| Country hold | | Swing | +1.7 | |

1956 Queensland state election: Warwick
| Party | Candidate | Votes | % | ±% |
|---|---|---|---|---|
| Country | Otto Madsen | 5,483 | 63.6 | −1.2 |
| Labor | Frank Drew | 3,137 | 36.4 | +1.2 |
| Total formal votes | | 8,620 | 99.1 | −0.1 |
| Informal votes | | 81 | 0.9 | +0.1 |
| Turnout | | 8,701 | 96.2 | +0.5 |
| Country hold | | Swing | −1.2 | |

1953 Queensland state election: Warwick
| Party | Candidate | Votes | % | ±% |
|---|---|---|---|---|
| Country | Otto Madsen | 5,651 | 64.8 | −3.6 |
| Labor | John O'Brien | 3,069 | 35.2 | +3.6 |
| Total formal votes | | 8,720 | 99.2 | 0.0 |
| Informal votes | | 67 | 0.8 | 0.0 |
| Turnout | | 8,787 | 95.7 | +2.3 |
| Country hold | | Swing | −3.6 | |

1950 Queensland state election: Warwick
| Party | Candidate | Votes | % | ±% |
|---|---|---|---|---|
| Country | Otto Madsen | 5,965 | 68.4 | |
| Labor | Terry Keane | 2,758 | 31.6 | |
| Total formal votes | | 8,723 | 99.2 | |
| Informal votes | | 67 | 0.8 | |
| Turnout | | 8,790 | 93.4 | |
| Country hold | | Swing | | |

=== Elections in the 1940s ===
1947 Queensland state election: Warwick
| Party | Candidate | Votes | % | ±% |
|---|---|---|---|---|
| Country | Otto Madsen | 4,657 | 51.7 | +6.1 |
| Labor | John Healy | 4,347 | 48.3 | −6.1 |
| Total formal votes | | 9,004 | 99.2 | +2.5 |
| Informal votes | | 72 | 0.8 | −2.5 |
| Turnout | | 9,076 | 89.7 | −0.5 |
| Country gain from Labor | | Swing | +6.1 | |

1944 Queensland state election: Warwick
| Party | Candidate | Votes | % | ±% |
|---|---|---|---|---|
| Labor | John Healy | 4,656 | 54.4 | −0.6 |
| People's Party | Richard Matthews | 3,901 | 45.6 | +0.6 |
| Total formal votes | | 8,557 | 96.7 | −2.4 |
| Informal votes | | 296 | 3.3 | +2.4 |
| Turnout | | 8,853 | 90.2 | −1.1 |
| Labor hold | | Swing | −0.6 | |

1941 Queensland state election: Warwick
| Party | Candidate | Votes | % | ±% |
|---|---|---|---|---|
| Labor | John Healy | 4,766 | 55.0 | +2.2 |
| Country | Richard Matthews | 3,899 | 45.0 | −2.2 |
| Total formal votes | | 8,665 | 99.1 | −0.1 |
| Informal votes | | 81 | 0.9 | +0.1 |
| Turnout | | 8,746 | 91.3 | −1.7 |
| Labor hold | | Swing | +2.2 | |

=== Elections in the 1930s ===
1938 Queensland state election: Warwick
| Party | Candidate | Votes | % | ±% |
|---|---|---|---|---|
| Labor | John Healy | 4,693 | 52.8 | +7.0 |
| Country | Edward Costello | 4,196 | 47.2 | +5.5 |
| Total formal votes | | 8,889 | 99.2 | −0.2 |
| Informal votes | | 68 | 0.8 | +0.2 |
| Turnout | | 8,957 | 93.0 | −1.3 |
| Labor hold | | Swing | +2.6 | |

1935 Queensland state election: Warwick
| Party | Candidate | Votes | % | ±% |
|---|---|---|---|---|
| Labor | John Healy | 4,096 | 45.8 | |
| CPNP | Daniel Connolly | 3,736 | 41.7 | |
| Independent | Herbert Dight | 1,119 | 12.5 | |
| Total formal votes | | 8,951 | 99.4 | |
| Informal votes | | 57 | 0.6 | |
| Turnout | | 9,008 | 94.3 | |
Two-party-preferred result
| Labor | John Healy | 4,247 | 50.2 | |
| CPNP | Daniel Connolly | 4,215 | 49.8 | |
| Labor gain from CPNP | | Swing | | |

1932 Queensland state election: Warwick
| Party | Candidate | Votes | % | ±% |
|---|---|---|---|---|
| CPNP | George Barnes | 3,865 | 51.7 | |
| Labor | John Healy | 3,399 | 45.5 | |
| Queensland Party | Alice Chambers | 209 | 2.8 | |
| Total formal votes | | 7,473 | 99.4 | |
| Informal votes | | 43 | 0.6 | |
| Turnout | | 7,516 | 96.1 | |
| CPNP hold | | Swing | | |

- Preferences were not distributed.

=== Elections in the 1920s ===
1929 Queensland state election: Warwick
| Party | Candidate | Votes | % | ±% |
|---|---|---|---|---|
| CPNP | George Barnes | 3,598 | 56.0 | +1.4 |
| Labor | Patrick McMahon | 2,827 | 44.0 | −1.4 |
| Total formal votes | | 6,425 | 99.1 | 0.0 |
| Informal votes | | 59 | 0.9 | 0.0 |
| Turnout | | 6,484 | 92.2 | +2.6 |
| CPNP hold | | Swing | +1.4 | |

1926 Queensland state election: Warwick
| Party | Candidate | Votes | % | ±% |
|---|---|---|---|---|
| CPNP | George Barnes | 3,261 | 54.6 | +0.8 |
| Labor | George James | 2,708 | 45.4 | −0.8 |
| Total formal votes | | 5,969 | 99.1 | −0.2 |
| Informal votes | | 52 | 0.9 | +0.2 |
| Turnout | | 6,021 | 89.6 | +3.3 |
| CPNP hold | | Swing | +0.8 | |

1923 Queensland state election: Warwick
| Party | Candidate | Votes | % | ±% |
|---|---|---|---|---|
| United | George Barnes | 3,128 | 53.8 | −1.2 |
| Labor | George Campbell | 2,685 | 46.2 | +1.2 |
| Total formal votes | | 5,813 | 99.3 | +0.1 |
| Informal votes | | 43 | 0.7 | −0.1 |
| Turnout | | 5,856 | 86.3 | +0.7 |
| United hold | | Swing | −1.2 | |

1920 Queensland state election: Warwick
| Party | Candidate | Votes | % | ±% |
|---|---|---|---|---|
| National | George Barnes | 2,448 | 55.0 | +1.0 |
| Labor | Donald Beatson | 2,006 | 45.0 | −1.0 |
| Total formal votes | | 4,454 | 99.2 | −0.1 |
| Informal votes | | 35 | 0.8 | +0.1 |
| Turnout | | 4,489 | 85.6 | +1.8 |
| National hold | | Swing | +1.0 | |

=== Elections in the 1910s ===
1918 Queensland state election: Warwick
| Party | Candidate | Votes | % | ±% |
|---|---|---|---|---|
| National | George Barnes | 2,319 | 54.0 | +4.7 |
| Labor | David Swiss-Davies | 1,974 | 46.0 | +19.8 |
| Total formal votes | | 4,293 | 99.3 | +0.5 |
| Informal votes | | 32 | 0.7 | −0.5 |
| Turnout | | 4,325 | 83.8 | −8.5 |
| National hold | | Swing | −8.0 | |

1915 Queensland state election: Warwick
| Party | Candidate | Votes | % | ±% |
|---|---|---|---|---|
| Liberal | George Barnes | 1,961 | 49.3 | −10.1 |
| Labor | Paul Bauers | 1,043 | 26.2 | −14.4 |
| Independent | Daniel Connolly | 973 | 24.5 | +24.5 |
| Total formal votes | | 3,977 | 98.8 | 0.0 |
| Informal votes | | 49 | 1.2 | 0.0 |
| Turnout | | 4,026 | 92.3 | +22.0 |
Two-party-preferred result
| Liberal | George Barnes | 1,989 | 62.0 | +2.6 |
| Labor | Paul Bauers | 1,220 | 38.0 | −2.6 |
| Liberal hold | | Swing | +2.6 | |

1912 Queensland state election: Warwick
| Party | Candidate | Votes | % | ±% |
|---|---|---|---|---|
| Liberal | George Barnes | 1,915 | 59.4 | |
| Labor | Angus Sinclair | 1,307 | 40.6 | |
| Total formal votes | | 3,222 | 98.8 | |
| Informal votes | | 38 | 1.2 | |
| Turnout | | 3,260 | 70.3 | |
| Liberal hold | | Swing | | |
