= Bankfoot House =

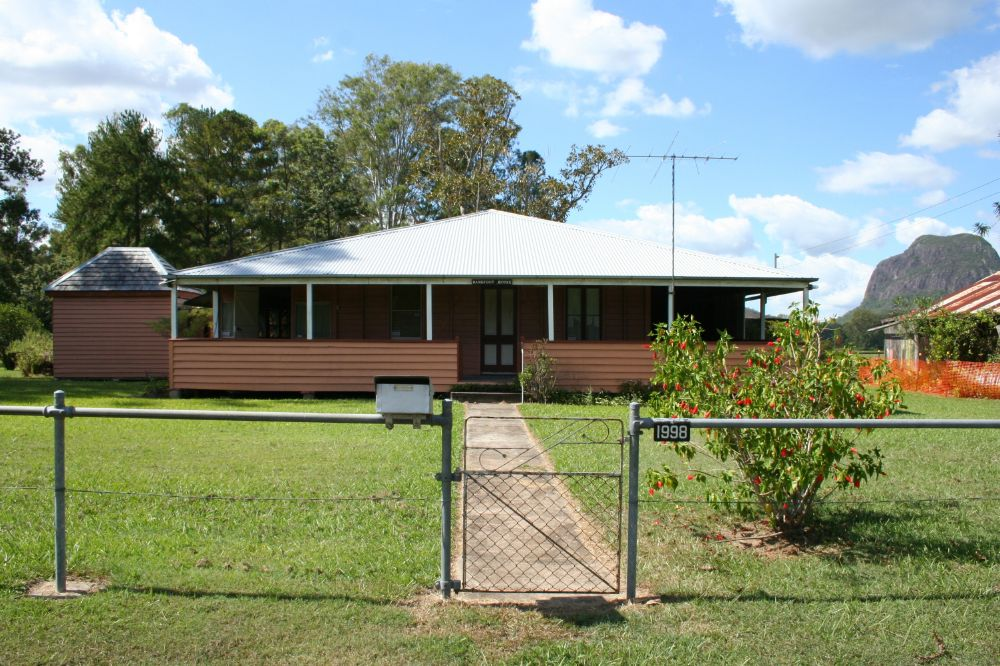
- Bankfoot House, 2007

- Location within Queensland Location within Australia
- 26.9143°S 152.9233°E
- Location: 1998 Old Gympie Road, Glass House Mountains, Sunshine Coast Region, Queensland, Australia

History
- Design period: 1870s–1890s (late 19th century)
- Built: 1878

Queensland Heritage Register
- Official name: Bankfoot House, SEQ-1E 38
- Type: state heritage (built)
- Designated: 11 December 2008
- Reference no.: 602702
- Significant period: 1868–2002
- Significant components: shed/s, ramp, laundry / wash house, garage, cairn, plaque, residential accommodation / farm house, trees/plantings, dairy/creamery

Bankfoot House is a heritage-listed homestead located at 1998 Old Gympie Road, Glass House Mountains, Sunshine Coast Region, Queensland, Australia. Built in 1878, the property was added to the Queensland Heritage Register on 11 December 2008, in recognition of its historical and cultural value.

== History ==
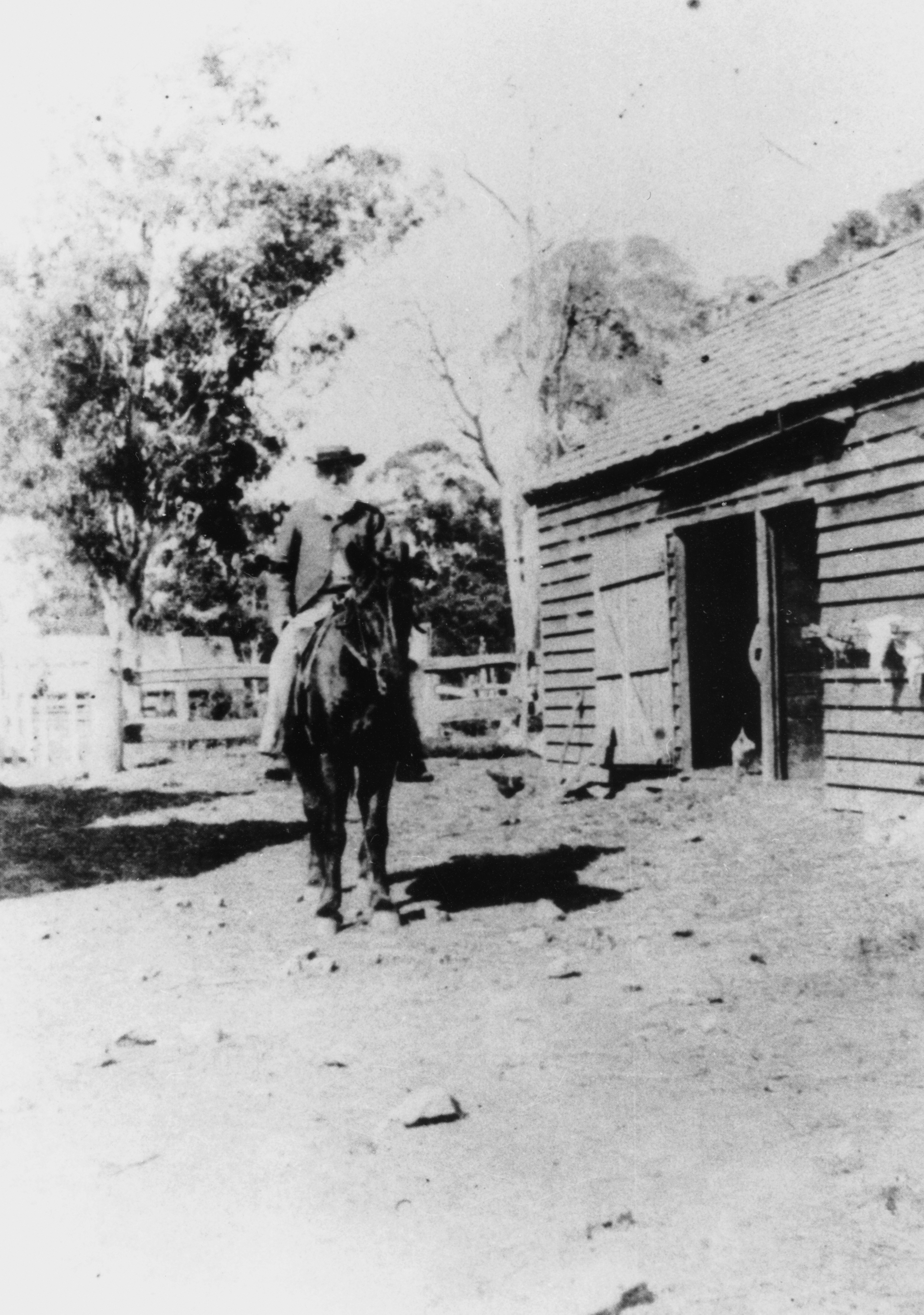
William Grigor of Bankfoot House Glass House Mountains

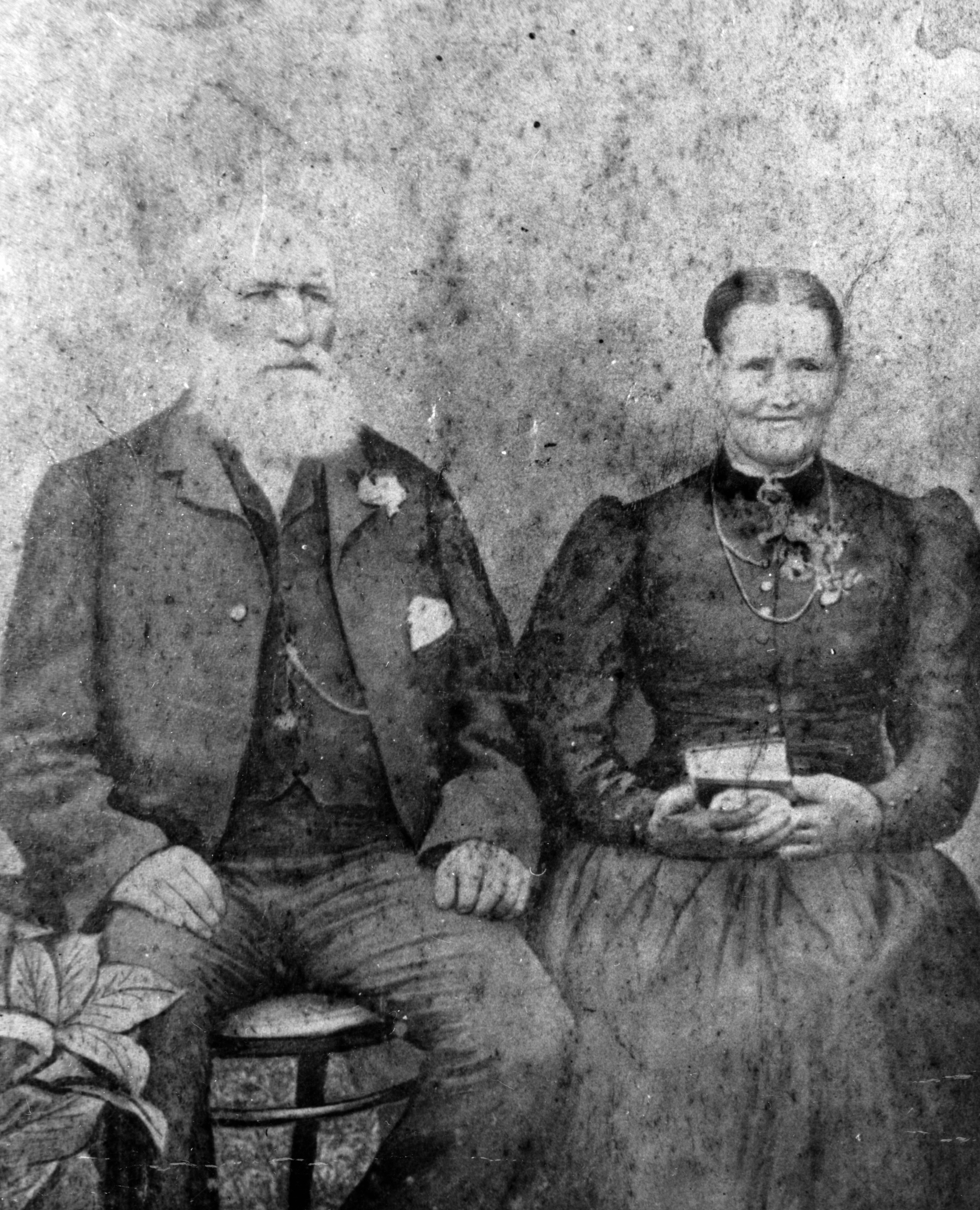
William Grigor and Mary Fenwick Grigor

The core of Bankfoot House, a timber homestead on the Old Gympie Road to the southwest of the township of Glass House Mountains, was built in 1878 by the first European settlers in the area, the Grigor family. The house, probably the oldest surviving building in the Glass House Mountains district, was part of a coach stop first established in 1868 on the first Brisbane-to-Gympie Road, and it was occupied by the Grigors and their descendants until 2002. It is the only surviving coach change station element on the Cobb and Co. Brisbane to Gympie route, and it is aptly located opposite the Australian Teamsters Hall of Fame and Spirit of Cobb and Co. complex.

The Glass House Mountains were named by Captain Cook in 1770, but it was to be another century before Europeans actually settled near the iconic volcanic plugs. The area between the Mooloolah and Maroochy Rivers was closed to settlement prior to 1860 as part of a Reserve proclaimed by New South Wales Governor George Gipps in 1842. The aim of the reserve was to protect the bunya trees that were highly valued as a food source by the Aboriginal people. After the separation of Queensland from New South Wales in 1859, Gipp's proclamation was rescinded by the Crown Lands Alienation Act 1860, which allowed for post-survey selection, and timber-getting licenses. It was this early activity in today's Maroochy Shire, along with the discovery of gold at Gympie in 1867, which led to the first white settlement at the Glasshouse Mountains further south.

William Grigor and Mary Fenwick both arrived at Moreton Bay on 19 January 1855, on the sailing ship William Miles. Mary had been born in Bankfoot, Perthshire, Scotland, in 1834, and had met William, also from Scotland, during her voyage to Australia. She worked as a governess to the children of Captain John Clements Wickham, the Government Resident for the Moreton Bay settlement, at Newstead House, and later as governess to the McConnel children on Durundur station (near Woodford), prior to marrying William in August 1863 at Eagle Farm.

William worked in various timber-related industries after his arrival in Moreton Bay, and became friends with another Scotsman, James Low, at Moggill. It has also been claimed that he worked at Eagle Farm, the Pine River, and Burpengary during these early years. In 1862 or 1863 Grigor and Low formed a partnership with William Pettigrew, who had opened a sawmill on William Street in Brisbane in 1853. Low and Grigor may have been timber getting in the Mooloolah River area as early as 1862. In the first half of 1863 the three partners converted the sailing ship Granite City into a stern paddle steamer named Gneering, which was to transport cut cedar from Pettigrew's depot near the Mooloolah River to his sawmill in Brisbane. Grigor would organise the timber getting, Low would supervise its transport, and Pettigrew would handle the sawmilling. The partnership had dissolved by 1868, and the Gneering was eventually wrecked in 1893.

Grigor and Low moved to the mouth of the Mooloolah River some time in 1863, to operate a store and timber depot. Various histories refer to either 'Low and Grigor's depot' or 'Pettigrew's depot' near the mouth of the Mooloolah River, but they may have been the same place. In 1865 Low and Grigor were timber getting on the Mooloolah River and lower Maroochy River, and Low also operated on the upper Maroochy. Mrs Low was the first white woman in the Maroochy district, arriving at the Mooloolah River several months after her son John was born in Spring Hill in December 1863. The Grigor's first four children were born at Mooloolah between October 1864 and January 1869. Grigor and Low also obtained adjoining allotments in Gloucester Street in Spring Hill in 1867, and built a pair of semi detached stone houses. William Grigor's House (now heritage-listed) stayed in the family until recently, and was rented out for most of their period of ownership.

Grigor and Low had established another timber depot, along with a store and post office (the first post office between Brisbane and Gympie), on the north bank of the Maroochy River opposite Dunethin Rock by 1867. In October 1867 James Nash discovered gold at Gympie, and Low and Grigor promptly cut a track north to Gympie from their Maroochy River depot, providing an alternative route to travelling by steamer from Brisbane to Maryborough, and then travelling overland south to Gympie. Instead, travellers could ship up the Maroochy River to Dunethin Rock before travelling north overland to Gympie. The other main land route to Gympie from Brisbane at this time was a track via Durundur Station, over the mountains to Conondale, then along the Mary River to Gympie.

Although the two men operated the Dunethin Rock depot, the men's families probably continued to reside near the Mooloolah River, as there are references to Grigor and Low moving from Mooloolah in 1868, to take up their selections at Glass House Mountains and Yandina respectively. However, another source claims that Grigor resided at Mount Buderim for a time before he moved to the Glass House Mountains. The men's decision to relocate during 1868 was prompted by the Queensland government's attempts to form a proper road from Brisbane and Gympie, and the two timber getters' realisation that there was a living to be made out of accommodating travellers on this road.

Tom Petrie was contracted by the government to blaze a more direct route from Brisbane after the gold discovery. As Cobb and Co. had announced its intent to run a service when a proper road was completed, Petrie was accompanied by the Cobb and Co. driver Hiram Barnes. The resulting track was sufficient for people walking or riding to Gympie, but in May 1868 the government allocated £2,700 for the construction of a road trafficable by carts and wagons. Work on the road, which followed Petrie's track, progressed slowly due to inclement weather and the defection of employees to the goldfields. A letter from Pettigrew in The Queenslander, 1 August 1868, noted that the section of the road from Gympie from Yandina was complete, and stated that from there to the head of navigation (on the Maroochy River) was 3 miles (4.8 km). If the road was as first rate as reported, the letter continued, Low and Grigor would shift to the head of navigation without delay. Early in October 1868, Cobb & Co.'s representative, Mr Hoyt, accompanied by a government road engineer, Frederick Byerly, took 28 hours travelling time to traverse the new road from Gympie to Brisbane in a two-horse buggy.

The Alienation of Crown Lands Act 1868 allowed for selection of Agricultural, First Class Pastoral, and Second Class Pastoral land (at decreasing prices and increasing acreages respectively), and cheap Homestead leases of 160 acres (65 ha). Low secured a selection near today's Yandina, on the south bank of the Maroochy River at the point where it was forded by the new Gympie road, and moved his depot and post office upstream from Dunethin Rock to this new location. He soon built a hotel, called "Maroochie House". Low later died at Bankfoot House in 1883, after falling sick while travelling.

Grigor in turned selected the 160 acres (65 ha) Homestead Lease where Bankfoot House was built. He selected Portion 1, Parish of Beerwah, on 16 October 1868, for £9/16/0 including the survey fee, and a Deed of Grant was later passed in January 1875. The western boundary of this portion was described in the application to lease as being the east side of "the main road leading from Brisbane to Gympie". Grigor also took out leases on nearby Portions 2, 3, 4, 5 and 7 between 1874 and 1878, with the leases on Portions 2 and 3 being transferred from Edmund Lander in May 1878. Portion 6 was purchased by James H. Pleace in 1884, and was briefly owned by John Grigor from September 1912 to November 1913 before subdivision began in 1914.

The original Bankfoot House, named after the home village of Mary Grigor, was most likely built between 16 October and 12 November 1868, by a ship's carpenter named Mewitt. There has been some speculation that it was built prior to October 1868, possibly even in late 1867, although it would have been bold of Grigor to start building before he had selected the land, or before he was sure that the new Government road would be passing by his doorstep.

The original building sat on the eastern side of the road, and was designed to provide accommodation for travellers. A dressed log foundation was laid on the ground, and local hardwood was pit-sawn for its framing and weatherboards (the site of the sawpit is across the road from the existing Bankfoot House). It was a narrow building about 60 feet (18 m) long, with bedrooms and a hall on the northern end, and a dining room at the southern end. The 9-by-4-foot (2.7 by 1.2 m) red cedar table, seating 16 guests, that was used in this dining room is still stored in the current Bankfoot House. Beech was used for the internal walls and cedar for the doors and windows was obtained from present day Peachester. The shingled roof was gabled with incorporated verandahs, the rear verandah being enclosed. Bankfoot House also acted as a post office and as a lunch stop and horse change station for Cobb and Co. coaches. The timber post office box is still extant and is stored at Bankfoot House. Other buildings at the change station eventually included a butcher's shop; the 1878 family homestead, a dairy/laundry; stables; feed shed; and Cobb and Co.'s Stables.

The site selected by Grigor, on a flat topped rise just north of Coonowrin Creek, was roughly halfway between the Caboolture River and Edmund Lander's homestead on the Mooloolah River (today's town of Mooloolah), both of which also became Cobb and Co. coaching stages. The landmark quality of the nearby Glass House Mountains, the fresh water available from Coonowrin Creek, and the elevated site of the accommodation house were all probably considerations in the siting of Bankfoot, especially the availability of water for horses. The top of the rise was level enough for horse-drawn vehicles to pull up in front of the building, and it had a long enough road frontage to accommodate stables and a feed shed next to the house. There was also a layer of stone about 600 millimetres (24 in) under the soil surface, which might have been useful in preventing wheels bogging below a certain point when the ground was sodden after rain.

When Cobb and Co. commenced its first coach run on 12 November 1868, Bankfoot provided the lunch stop. The coach, driven by Hiram Barnes, had left Brisbane early that morning, and a second coach, driven by Robert Martin, had left Gympie for Brisbane at the same time. The two coaches met at the Maroochy River (Low's depot) on Thursday night, and both successfully completed their journeys on Friday evening, 13 November. Hiram Barnes received a hero's welcome at Gympie. The fare for the journey was £3/10/0, and it had taken two days to complete the distance of about 117.5 miles (189.1 km).

In late November 1868 the change stations between Brisbane and Gympie were: Petrie's (North Pine River); the punt over the Caboolture River; Glass House (Bankfoot); Lander's (Mooloolah); Cobbs Camp (Woombye); Maroochy (Yandina); Wards (en route to Tuchekoi); and Traveston. Approaching Bankfoot, coach drivers would blow a bugle when 0.5 miles (0.80 km) away, so meals would be laid when the coach rolled in. The distance between change stations varied from about 8 to 16 miles (13 to 26 km). Later, a wet weather route travelled from the Maroochy River to Gympie via Yandina Cattle Run, Cooroy, and Six Mile Creek. During 1868 and 1869 the coaches departed Brisbane and Gympie twice weekly. Although the first trip's overnight stop was at Low's depot, Cobbs Camp was soon completed and was also used for overnight accommodation. The coaches would switch passengers and return to their original starting points the following day. Cobb and Co. also held the contract for Mail Service No.7 from 1868 to 1879. The contract then went to McCallum Coaches, who lost it to the railways after the North Coast railway line from Brisbane to Landsborough opened in February 1890.

The road from Brisbane to Gympie became the best known Cobb & Co. route in Queensland, and the most rugged section was from the Maroochy River to Traveston, which is reflected in the greater distance covered from Brisbane to the Maroochy River (76.5 miles (123.1 km)) in the same time that it took to get from Gympie to the Maroochy River (41 miles (66 km)). The road degenerated quickly however, and in 1871 the English novelist Anthony Trollope was warned against travelling by coach because of the terrible state of the Gympie road. He went regardless, and wrote that "There is often no road, and the coach is taken at random through the forest. Not infrequently a fallen tree blocks the track ... But the great miracle is the sudden pinches, looking as though they were almost perpendicular, down which the coach is taken – and then the equally sharp ascents ..." In 1876 Cobb and Co. ended its passenger service, and it eventually sold its mail run as well, since the mail coach could take up to six days to reach Gympie.

By 1874, improvements on Grigor's Portion 1, as noted on a "Certificate of Fulfilment of Conditions by Selector" included: fences, a dwelling house, stables, stockyards and other outbuildings, with seven acres under cultivation, to a total of ?600 value. In March 1878, two months before Portion 2 (on the opposite side of the road to Bankfoot) was transferred from Edmund Lander to William Grigor, it was noted that Lander's improvements included a slab humpy with a bark roof, a five stall stable and a shed. It has been stated that Cobb & Co. had their own stables on Portion 2, and that the groom used to board at Bankfoot House. His tasks included unhooking the horses, hitching up a new team, and leading the old team away to be washed down while the passengers were having lunch. The horse feed was purchased from Grigor, who grew oats on his property.

Apart from being a coach change station, and providing overnight accommodation and stabling for miners and other travellers, the Grigor family also had their own dairy herd, and ran a butcher's shop and store to supply miners on their way to Gympie. Their closest neighbour between 1871 and 1878 was Isaac Burgess at Mellum Creek (later Landsborough). Prices for meals, a bed, and horse feed were each one shilling, so that for five shillings a traveller could get dinner, bed and breakfast, two feeds for one horse, and overnight stabling.

In 1878, business was so good that a new building (the core of the current house) was added behind the original accommodation house. This seems to contradict reports that the road was no longer fit for coach travel by the late 1870s, but there may still have been plenty of travellers on foot or horseback. For example, in 1884 James Whalley and his son walked from Tingalpa to Petrie's Creek, a journey that took three and a half days, with overnight stops at South Pine, Bankfoot, and Cobbs Camp.

The 1878 building provided bedrooms for the expanding Grigor family, and a kitchen for the accommodation house, and was connected to the 1868 building by a covered walkway. It was built on timber stumps, out of pit-sawn timber. The eastern, southern and western external walls used beech, with exposed studs on the east and west sides under the two verandahs. Hardwood weatherboards were used on the north side, which also had an attic window. Beech was also used for the internal walls and ceilings, and cedar was used for the doors and windows. The high-pitched gabled roof was clad in corrugated iron.

As there was no school in the area until 1906, Grigor's sons had to ride down to Morayfield on Monday morning with their sister Clementina. Clementina boarded with the school master while the two boys lived by themselves in a little hut Grigor built on the side of the Caboolture River bank. They used to look after themselves from Monday to Friday. On Friday the boys, with their sister, would ride back to Bankfoot House. A fig tree and pine tree were planted by the boys soon after Bankfoot House was constructed.

The Grigors ran the post office from 1868 until 1907. After the train line arrived, William Grigor (senior) used to take the outgoing mail to the station, and returned to Bankfoot House with mail from the train. William Grigor is listed as the Postmaster at Glass House Mountains in the Queensland Post Office Directory from 1892 to 1907. After he died in 1907 Clementina carried on service to about 1910, when the Post Office agency was transferred to the railway station. Although the railway reduced trade at Bankfoot, its role as a post office kept Bankfoot busy. Accommodation was still available, including for parties who had come to climb the Glass House Mountains. Around 1911 a group climbed Coonowrin after staying at Bankfoot House, and then cycled back to Brisbane that afternoon, reaching home at 10.15am.

Portion 1 was transferred to Clementina in December 1905, although William Grigor continued to live at Bankfoot until he died. Clementina was William's youngest daughter, and she married William Burgess in 1902. The couple continued living in the house after the death of William Grigor. Mary Grigor had died at Albion in 1900. William and Mary Grigor had nine children between 1864 and 1878, but three died young: David died in April 1874 aged 11 months; Margaret (Clementina's twin sister) died in September 1878 age 2 months; and Robert Henry died in October 1879 aged 4 years and two months. The unmarked graves of these three children and of an Aboriginal playmate are located just inside the fence line of a property to the south of Bankfoot House. A plaque was erected in 1988 just outside the fence line.

William and Mary's oldest son, John Grigor, became a Councillor on the Caboolture Shire Council (established 1903) in 1906, and served on the Landsborough Shire Council after 1912. John's brother William and his brother-in law William Burgess were also Landsborough Shire councillors. William Grigor (Junior) developed a sawmill at Maleny, and later moved to Peachester, and the Grigor family has continued its links with the timber industry in Peachester.

The 1868 building's log foundations eventually suffered from termites and rot, although a 1926 article in the Brisbane Courier referred to the "remains" of the old accommodation house, whose walls and ceilings were "in a splendid state of preservation". As the Great Depression reduced the funds available for repairs, in 1930 it was decided to pull down the 1868 dwelling and to use the timber to construct two extra rooms, a bedroom and dining room, at the rear of the 1878 dwelling. Most of the work was work done by William Burgess and a helper. The roof-line was lowered to form a hipped corrugated iron roof, and a new kitchen was added, along with an incorporated verandah on all four sides, complete with a weatherboard clad balustrade. Later, Jack Ferris would construct a bathroom for Clementina on the southeast corner, and in the 1960s he enclosed the northern and eastern verandahs, and added a storeroom to part of the southern verandah. Electricity was connected in 1952, and the roof was replaced in 1982.

Clementina died in 1963, having lived at Bankfoot her entire 85 years. Title of Portion 1 had been transferred to her son William Isaac Burgess in 1952. Clementina's daughter, Mary, and her husband, John (Jack) Ferris, bought the house and two acres from William in December 1964, and became the third generation of the family to live there. Mary, who was born in the house, lived there until her death in 1987. Jack died in 2002 aged 102 years old, and the house and all its contents, representing generations of family history, was purchased by the Caloundra City Council in 2004.

The site is maintained by The Friends of Bankfoot House in conjunction with the Sunshine Coast Council.

== Description ==
Bankfoot House occupies 3.4 acres (1.4 ha) of a flat-topped rise on Old Gympie Road approximately 200 metres (660 ft) south of the intersection with Coonowrin Road and about 4.5 kilometres (2.8 mi) west of the township of Glasshouse Mountains. It is within a short strip of residential properties on the east side of Old Gympie Road extending from Coonowrin Road to Marshs Road and opposite the Australian Teamsters Hall of Fame and camping grounds. The property has commanding views east to the Glasshouse Mountains and generally across surrounding paddocks and bushland.

The property accommodates a number of structures including a house, dairy/laundry, wagon shed, farm shed/garage, vehicle ramp, water tanks and trellis within a grassed yard with trees and scattered plantings. A commemorative cairn with plaque stands in the front yard. The west side of the property and road reserve have mounded areas and evidence of wheel tracks.

A range of equipment, tools, furniture, fittings, pictures and objects are found throughout the site.

=== The House ===
A timber-framed and -clad building supported by low timber and concrete stumps and sheltered by a hipped corrugated galvanised iron sheeted roof, the house faces west onto Old Gympie Road. A decorative iron and wire entrance gate opens from the boundary on Old Gympie Road onto a concrete path that leads to the house. The house has open verandahs to the west and part of the south and enclosed verandahs to the other sides.

The building extends around the 1878 house at its core and incorporates a range of timbers. Marks, joints and cuts in the timber indicate that some timber has been reused from elsewhere and may have come from previous structures on the site. The internal partitions and ceilings are beech and door and window joinery is cedar.

The exterior is clad with weatherboards which infill the balustrading to the west and south verandahs. Part of the south verandah is protected by louvred timber shutters and timber blinds. Verandah ceilings are unlined to the open verandahs and battened and sheeted in the enclosed areas.

The walls are single-skin with exposed studs to the east and west verandahs. The west wall is lined with 140-millimetre (5.5 in) horizontal beaded tongue and groove boards. The south wall is clad to the exterior with rough sawn beaded tongue and groove boards with joins at the junctions of the stud framing and the internal partitions. The north wall is clad with horizontal beaded tongue and groove boards.

The plan is organised around a central corridor with bedrooms opening off to the south and lounge, bedroom and dining to the north. A verandah runs around this core with a kitchen and stove alcove built into the northeast corner and bathroom and storeroom to the southeast. The north verandah is enclosed with hopper windows (casements fitted to open horizontally) and lined with plywood and fibrous sheeting.

The post to the southwest corner of the house has the mortice and tenon joints that were part of the earlier 1878 verandah structure.

The internal partitions are post and rail framed and lined with vertical beaded tongue and groove boards. The ceilings are lined with beaded tongue and groove boards.

French doors open onto the verandahs from the southwest and north bedrooms and from the lounge and dining rooms to the north.

The walls between the north bedroom/dining room and middle/east southern bedrooms have window openings now boarded over, although the sills remain. Two horizontal casement windows have been placed in a high window opening in the north bedroom.

Floor coverings include vinyl and carpet. The house is painted outside and in, but the verandah boards are unpainted. Distinctive vertical stripes are painted into a number of doors.

The house contains equipment, furniture, fittings, pictures, objects, clothing, textiles, crockery and utensils dating from 1800s to the late 20th century. It contains documents and photographs associated with the Grigor families and the occupation of the site as a staging post, guesthouse, residence and farm. Important items include the post office letterbox, lounge room furniture, a pianola, a range of everyday domestic objects (lamps, irons, etc.), a large table and a kitchen dresser. A horse shoe hangs over the front door. A full inventory of the items in the house is being compiled by the Caloundra City Council.

=== Dairy and laundry ===
A short covered walkway connects the dairy and laundry to the north verandah. The dairy is a small rectangular timber-framed weatherboard clad building sheltered by a hipped shingle roof. Supported on low timber stumps, the dairy has a fixed timber louvred window to the north, a timber door opening on the south and a timber floor. The dairy accommodates a range of equipment and objects including dairying equipment and saws.

The corrugated galvanised iron clad skillion-roofed lean-to laundry stands to the east of the dairy building on a concrete slab floor. It has doors opening to the north and south and the remains of a fireplace for the copper stand outside the northern door. The laundry accommodates two concrete tubs and an assortment of equipment and other objects.

=== Wagon shed ===
The open, rectangular wagon shed stands in the northeast corner of the yard. The low-pitched skillion roof, supported on round timber posts with round log roof framing, shelters a bullock wagon and other equipment and objects.

=== Garage/shed ===
A timber framed and clad (weatherboards to the west, south and east and palings to the north) garage/shed stands to the south of the house. It consists of a rectangular hip roofed portion with a skillion roofed lean-to abutting this to the south. The roofs are clad with corrugated galvanised iron. There is a concrete slab at the doors to the west and dirt floors throughout. The shed floor is a step above the garage, reached by a concrete step. An internal partition of vertical boards separates the two sections. Hinged hatches open from the garage side into the shed once accessing chicken nesting areas. A range of timbers has been used to construct the garage/shed. Marks on the timber indicate they have been reused from elsewhere.

=== Other ===
A timber machinery ramp stands to the south of the garage/shed. Two concrete water tanks stand to the south of the house and a septic tank stands to the east.

A variety of timber posts with threaded wire fence the property except for a stretch made of hollow metal pipe with threaded wire to each side of the entrance gate.

The yard accommodates a timber trellis, a Hills hoist clothes line, posts from an earlier clothes line and a memorial cairn and plaque.

There are three prominent bunya pines to the north and two to the south. The yard contains a scattering of other vegetation including a large fig adorned with elkhorns to the east of the house and eucalypts and fruit trees.

The west side of the yard contains a number of mounds and depressions that may indicate locations of previous buildings. The road reserve to the west and northwest edge of the property has a number of depressions that may indicate routes of earlier wagon tracks.

Associated sites (outside the heritage boundary) The remains of a sawpit and rubbish dump that may have been associated with the Grigor families are located in the grounds of the Australian Teamsters Hall of Fame property across the road.

A number of graves lie within the property at 1970 Old Gympie Road where David, Margaret and Robert Grigor and an aboriginal playmate are buried. Locations have not been determined. A plaque on the footpath commemorates these burials.

== Heritage listing ==
Bankfoot House was listed on the Queensland Heritage Register on 11 December 2008 having satisfied the following criteria.

The place is important in demonstrating the evolution or pattern of Queensland's history.

The oldest known surviving building in the Glasshouse Mountains district, Bankfoot House is important in demonstrating the pattern and nature of pioneering settlement in the region, and in demonstrating the pattern of land use and occupancy in rural Queensland during the late 19th century and 20th century. As well as providing a staging post for Cobb and Co between 1868 and 1879, operating a guesthouse for travellers until the 1910s or later, and running the local post office from 1868 to 1907, the Grigor family were also engaged in timber-getting, had their own dairy herd, and ran a butcher's shop and store to supply miners on their way to Gympie. The range of activities conducted on the property as responses by the family to changing markets, industries and opportunities, provides evidence of the economic development of the region.

As a coach change station on the original Brisbane to Gympie road, which was a vital transport link between 1868 and 1891, Bankfoot House was part of the most famous Cobb and Co. run in Queensland. It is important in illustrating the impact of the establishment of transport and communications links between Brisbane and Gympie on the pattern of settlement of the region.

The place demonstrates rare, uncommon or endangered aspects of Queensland's cultural heritage.

Bankfoot House is rare as the only known surviving coach change station on the Brisbane-Gympie coach route. The place is also a rare example of a place owned and occupied by several generations of the one family from 1860s to 2002.

Indications of recycling and reuse of materials on the property provide evidence of the living conditions and demonstrate a way of life based on resourcefulness that was once common and is now rare.

The place has potential to yield information that will contribute to an understanding of Queensland's history.

Documentation (including correspondence, commercial documents, photographs and paintings) associated with the place and physical evidence (including built structures, materials, furniture, fittings and objects) on and beneath the ground have potential to contribute to a greater understanding of the place and the settlement of Queensland.

The place is important in demonstrating the principal characteristics of a particular class of cultural places.

Bankfoot House with its range of elements and structures (including farm house, dairy, sheds and equipment) is an example of a rural property that has adapted and changed over time in response to opportunities and demands - the structures were built using new and recycled materials and extended using timber from previous structures as the family took on new businesses and extended existing enterprises.

The siting of Bankfoot House on a flat ridge easily visible to travellers on the road, and near fresh water, is a good example of a favourable siting for a changing station on a coach route.

The place is important because of its aesthetic significance.

The place is a landmark on Old Gympie Road and stands in a picturesque setting occupying an area of level ground on a rise along the road with views out to the Glasshouse Mountains to the east (particularly Mt Tibrogargan) and surrounding paddocks/bushland generally. Prominent bunya pines in the garden stand as a distinctive element in the landscape.
