= Walter Barnes (politician) =

Australian politician (1858–1933)

The Hon Walter Barnes
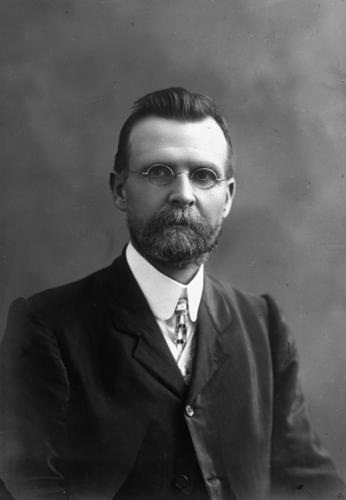

23rd Treasurer of Queensland
- In office 7 February 1911 – 1 June 1915
- Preceded by: Arthur Hawthorn
- Succeeded by: Ted Theodore
- Constituency: Bulimba
- In office 21 May 1929 – 17 June 1932
- Preceded by: William McCormack
- Succeeded by: William Forgan Smith
- Constituency: Wynnum

Member of the Queensland Legislative Assembly for Bulimba
- In office 23 February 1901 – 22 May 1915
- Preceded by: James Dickson
- Succeeded by: Hugh McMinn
- In office 16 March 1918 – 12 May 1923
- Preceded by: Hugh McMinn
- Succeeded by: Albert Wright

Member of the Queensland Legislative Assembly for Wynnum
- In office 11 May 1923 – 19 February 1933
- Preceded by: New seat
- Succeeded by: James Bayley

Personal details
- Born: 7 September 1858 Castlemaine, Victoria, Australia
- Died: 19 February 1933 (aged 74) Brisbane, Queensland
- Resting place: South Brisbane Cemetery
- Party: Ministerialist
- Other political affiliations: Country and Progressive National Party, National
- Spouse: Katherine Florence Edmonds
- Relations: George Powell Barnes (brother), Hiram Barnes (father)
- Occupation: Managing Director

Walter Henry Barnes (7 September 1858 – 19 February 1933) was a longtime member of the Queensland Legislative Assembly.

== Early years ==
Barnes was born in Castlemaine, Colony of Victoria, a son of Hiram Barnes, who took his family to Queensland when he was six years old.

He gained employment in the saddler business, then worked as a driver for Cobb and Co. coaches. He next worked for the Post Office, then in 1884 joined his brother's firm of Barnes and Co. Ltd., produce and general merchants. He held the position of manager of the Roma Street business for very many years, and ultimately became managing director of the company.

== Politics ==
For 25 years he was a member of the Coorparoo Shire Council, of which body he was five times Chairman.

He first entered Parliament in 1901 as member for Bulimba, succeeding Sir James R. Dickson, who left State politics for Federal Parliament. With the exception of a break of three years, Barnes represented Bulimba and, later, Wynnum, in the Queensland Legislative Assembly until his death.

His first office was that of Minister for Lands in the short-lived (19 November 1907 – 18 February 1908) Philp Ministry. Then, in the Kidston coalition Ministry, he served as Minister tor Public Instruction, and had the distinction of piloting the University of Queensland Bill through Parliament. In 1909 Mr. Barnes was allotted the combined portfolios of Public Works and Education, and in 1912 became Treasurer and Minister for Works in the Denham administration, and served as Acting Premier during Denham's absence in Great Britain.

He again served as Treasurer in the Moore Administration.

He was defeated in the contest for Bulimba in 1915, but was again returned at the general election of 1918, and later became the member for Wynnum.

== Later life ==
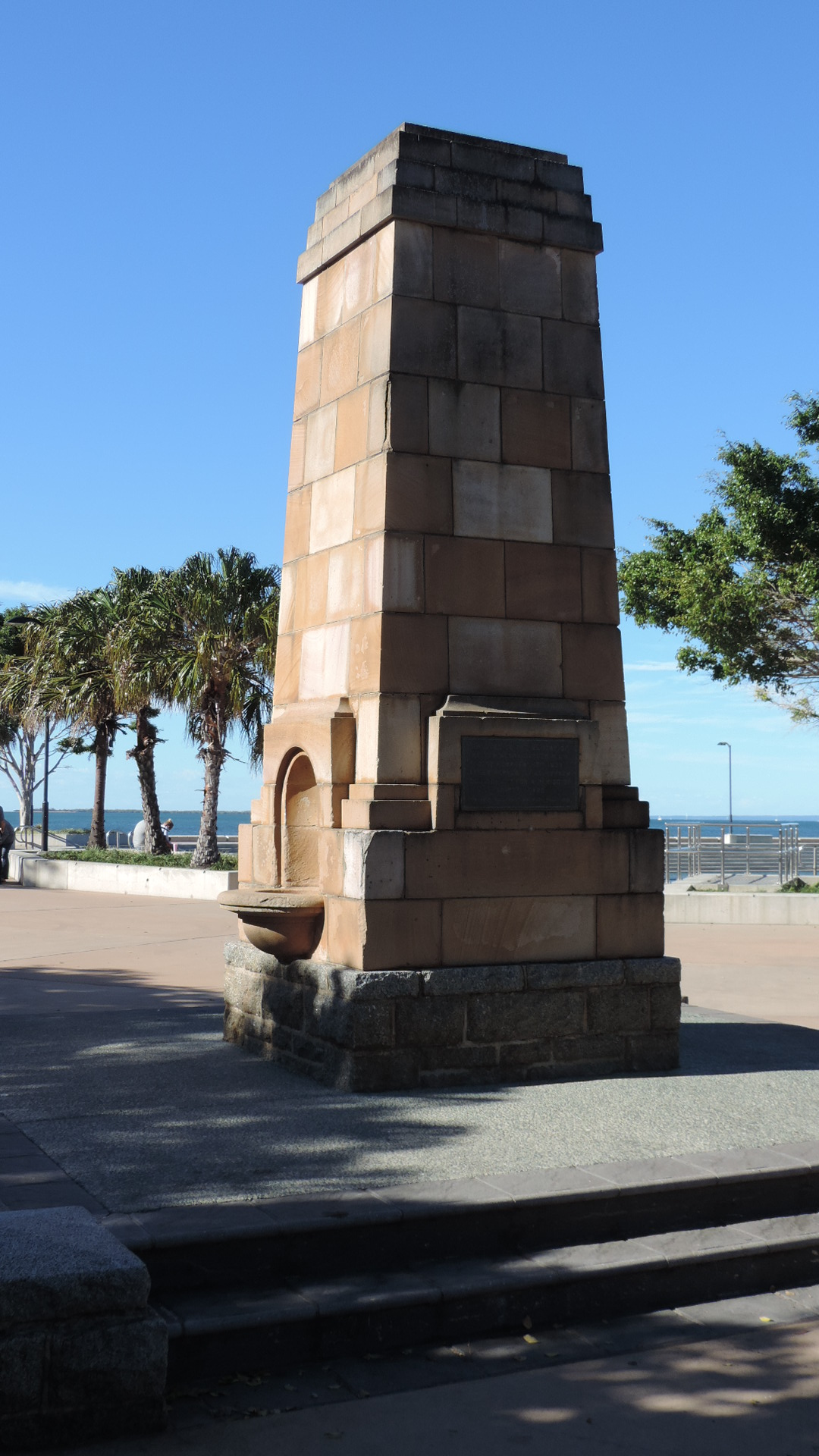
Memorial to Walter Henry Barnes, Wynnum, 2014

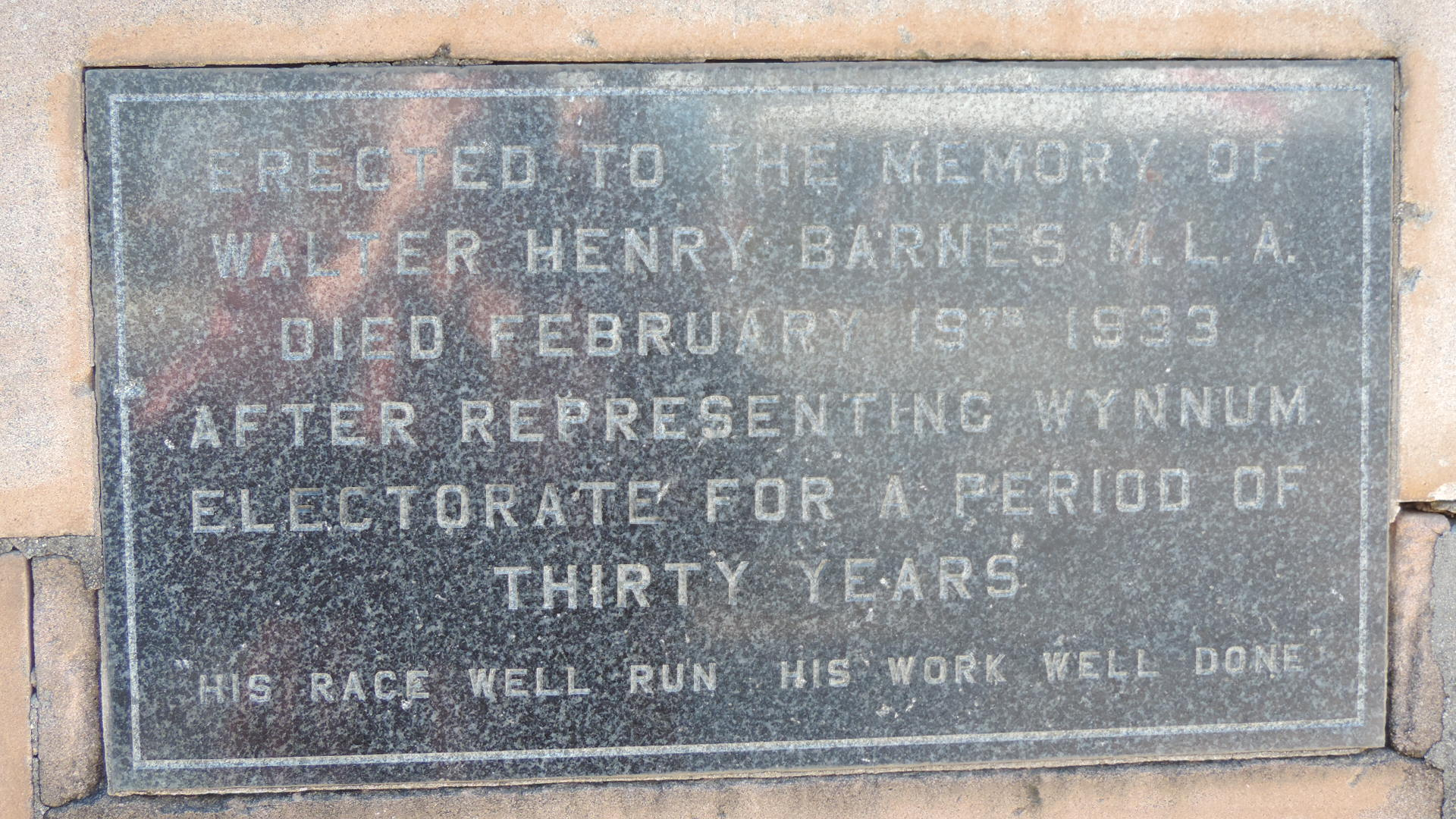
Close-up of memorial

Barnes died at his home in Coorparoo after suffering poor health for several months. He was accorded a State Funeral and buried in South Brisbane Cemetery. A memorial was erected to him on the Wynnum foreshore near the Wynnum Wading Pool.

== Family ==
His brother George Powell Barnes, who founded Barnes and Co., was also in politics, as the member for Warwick.

He was married, and had one son, Cedric Barnes of Brisbane.

Parliament of Queensland
Preceded by James Dickson	Member for Bulimba; 1901–1915	Succeeded by Hugh McMinn
Preceded by Hugh McMinn	Member for Bulimba; 1918–1923	Succeeded by Albert Wright
New district	Member for Wynnum; 1923–1933	Succeeded by James Bayley
