= William Grigor's House =

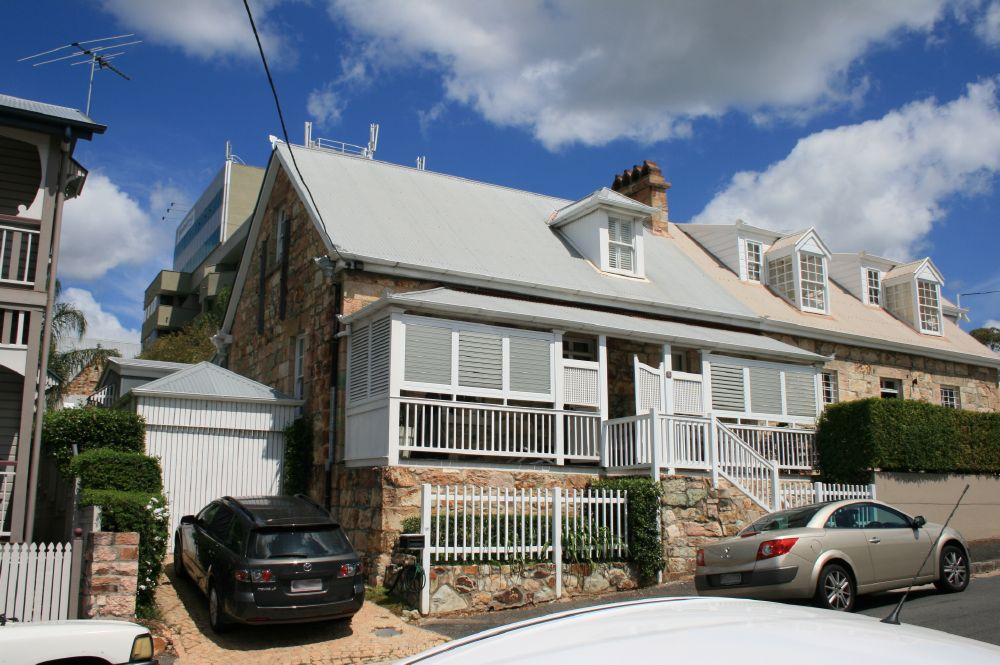
- William Grigor's House, 2008

- Location within Queensland Location within Australia
- 27.4601°S 153.0284°E
- Location: 19 Gloucester Street, Spring Hill, City of Brisbane, Queensland, Australia

History
- Design period: 1840s–1860s (mid-19th century)
- Built: late 1860s

Queensland Heritage Register
- Official name: 19 Gloucester Street
- Type: state heritage (built)
- Designated: 30 July 1993
- Reference no.: 600308
- Significant period: 1860s–1880s (fabric); 1860s (historical)
- Significant components: kitchen/kitchen house, attic, residential accommodation – maisonette/s / duplex

William Grigor's House is a heritage-listed semi-detached house (one of a duplex) at 19 Gloucester Street, Spring Hill, City of Brisbane, Queensland, Australia. It was built in the late 1860s. It was added to the Queensland Heritage Register on 30 July 1993.

== History ==
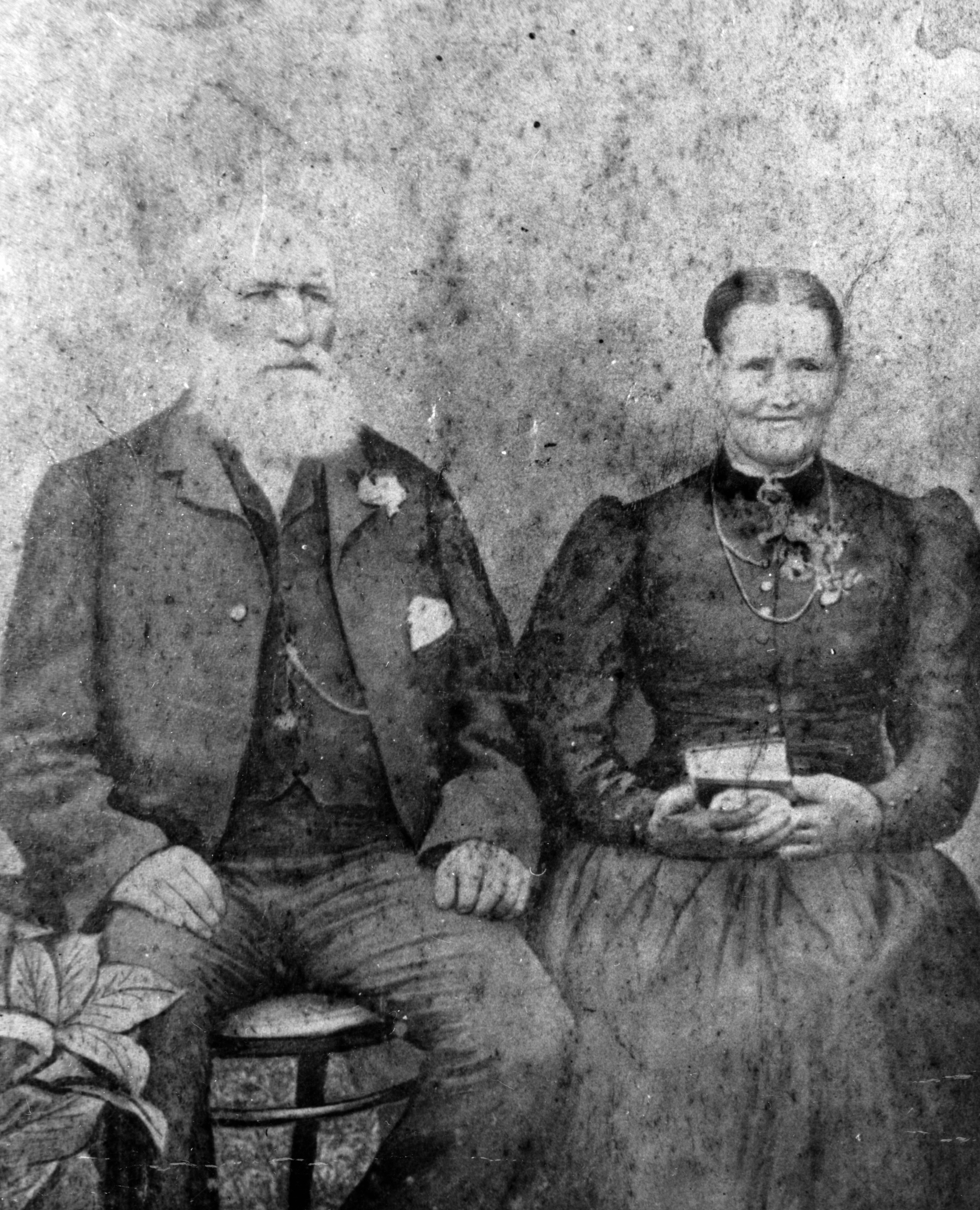
William Grigor and Mary Fenwick Grigor

William Grigor's House is a semi-detached stone house, constructed in the late 1860s during the early growth of Spring Hill as a suburb of Brisbane. The house was built for William Grigor, a Scottish immigrant who had arrived in Moreton Bay in 1855.

Grigor and his friend and business partner, James Low, acquired the adjoining properties in Gloucester Street in 1867 and proceeded to construct the pair of semi-detached stone houses on the two sites.

In 1862 Grigor, Low and William Pettigrew had formed a partnership, and Grigor and Low moved to Mooloolah where they hauled timber and rafted it to Brisbane. In 1863 Grigor married Mary Fenwick and together with the Lows, continued working in the timber industry.

By 1868 it would appear that the partnership was experiencing financial difficulties and was possibly dissolved. Low and his family moved to his selection on the banks of the South Maroochy River (later called Yandina). In October 1868 Grigor selected land in the parish of Beerwah, where he commenced construction of Bankfoot House in anticipation of the forthcoming Cobb and Co coach route between Brisbane and Gympie. When Banksfoot House was completed, Grigor was rejoined by his wife, and they established an accommodation house, which was also a post-office, dinner stage and change of horses for Cobb and Co coaches. It is possible that Mary had stayed at the Spring Hill house while Bankfoot House was being built.

For over one hundred and twenty years the property in Gloucester Street has remained with the Grigors and their descendants, and has been rented during most of that period.

In the 1980s the house was returned to as close to original condition as possible. This included replacement of the verandah fabric and guttering to match existing materials.

== Description ==
William Grigor's House is a cottage made of Brisbane tuff with sandstone dressings, with a two-storeyed brick and stone wing to the rear. Its steeply pitched corrugated iron roof contains an attic storey with a single dormer window, and it has a timber verandah with a corrugated iron skillion roof overlooking Gloucester St. It is one of a pair of cottages which are semi-detached, and sits on an eastward falling slope. The cottage has a simple rectangular plan with four rooms to the ground floor which run off a central corridor, and two rooms above. A timber and corrugated iron room links the cottage to the rear wing, which contains a former kitchen with a single room above.

The verandah sits at half level above Gloucester St, and is accessed via stone stairs. It has timber rectangular columns with timber capitals, and an unpainted timber boarded ceiling. The dormer above has a hipped roof, and the half-round guttering is decorated with cresting at the corners. A sandstone and brick chimney rises above the roofline. The windows are multi-paned timber sliding sash windows, and have textured sandstone lintels, quoins and sills; the doors also have textured sandstone surrounds. The eastern attic window is flanked by two timber rails which may have been a lifting device. The rear wing has a hipped corrugated iron roof which adjoins that of its neighbour. A small brick and corrugated iron outhouse sits to the west of the kitchen.

The walls and ceilings in the cottage are plaster and lath, with modestly detailed timber trim throughout (much of it cedar). The timber work includes deep window reveals, mantelpieces to the two northern ground floor rooms, a louvred timber door to the north-west room, steep stairs to the attic rooms and cupboards in the eastern attic room. The rear wing contains an early stove, and steep stairs with a shutter door above.

William Grigor's House is a rare example of an 1860s inner city residence. The interior is highly intact. The modestly detailed exterior is also intact and contributes to the surrounding turn-of-the-century residential streetscape.

== Heritage listing ==
William Grigor's House was listed on the Queensland Heritage Register on 30 July 1993 having satisfied the following criteria.

The place is important in demonstrating the evolution or pattern of Queensland's history.

The residence is important in demonstrating the pattern of Queensland's history, in particular the settlement of Spring Hill as a suburb of Brisbane.

The place demonstrates rare, uncommon or endangered aspects of Queensland's cultural heritage.

The residence remains as a rare intact example of an 1860s semi-detached stone house in Brisbane.

The place is important in demonstrating the principal characteristics of a particular class of cultural places.

The residence exhibits the principal characteristics of an 1860s stone house in Brisbane and its contribution to the Gloucester St streetscape exhibits aesthetic characteristics valued by the community.

The place is important because of its aesthetic significance.

The residence exhibits the principal characteristics of an 1860s stone house in Brisbane and its contribution to the Gloucester St streetscape exhibits aesthetic characteristics valued by the community.
