= Barnes and Co. Trading Place =

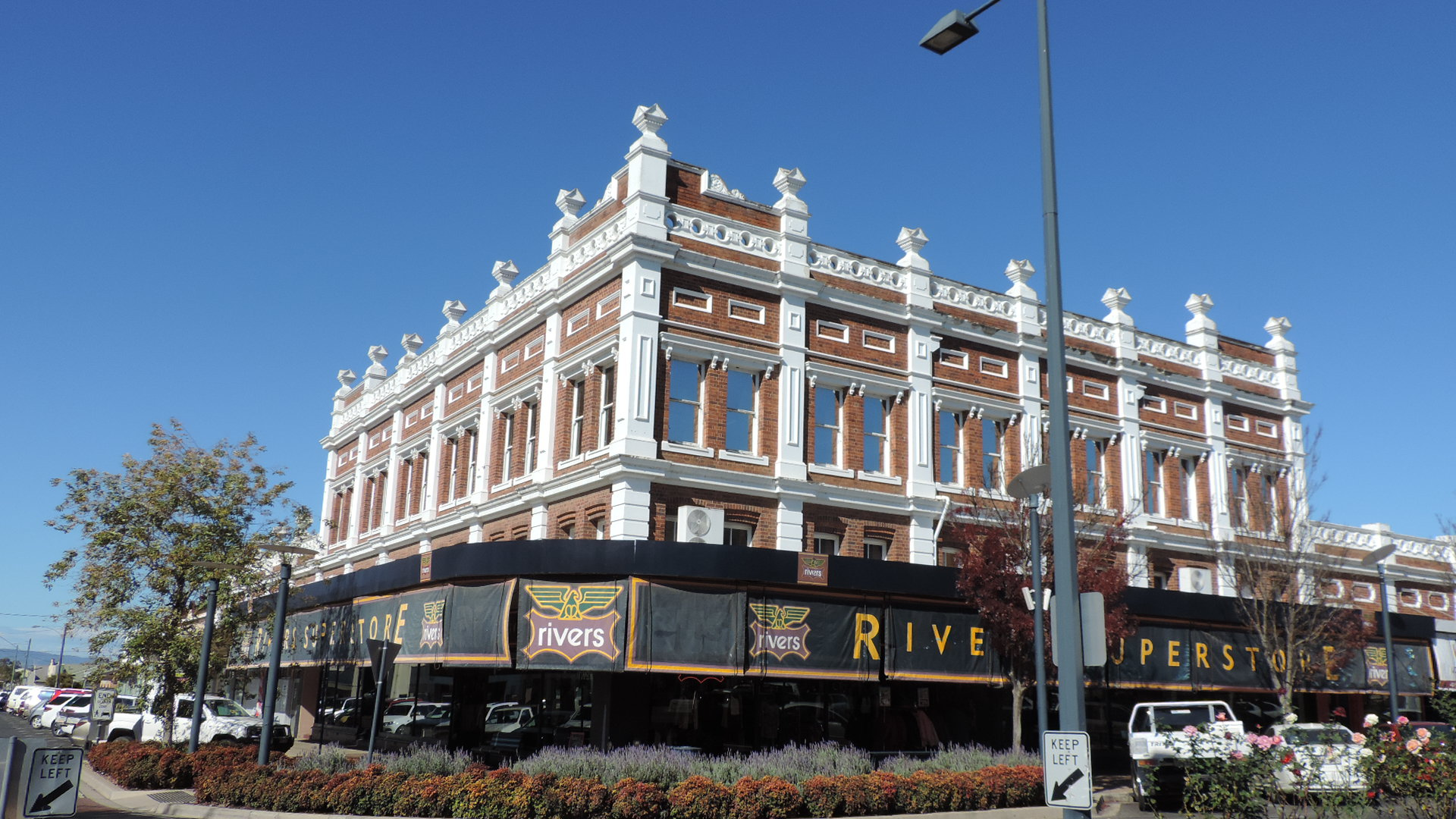
- Smith & Miller Building (formerly Barnes & Co), 2015

- Location within Queensland Location within Australia
- 28.2176°S 152.0327°E
- Location: 118 Palmerin Street, Warwick, Southern Downs Region, Queensland, Australia

History
- Design period: 1900–1914 (early 20th century)
- Built: 1910–1911

Site notes
- Architect: Wallace & Gibson

Queensland Heritage Register
- Official name: Barnes and Co. Trading Place, Smith and Miller Furniture Store
- Type: state heritage (built)
- Designated: 21 October 1992
- Reference no.: 600956
- Significant period: 1910s (fabric); 1911–ongoing (historical retail use)
- Significant components: hoist, safe
- Builders: M Ivory

Barnes and Co. Trading Place is a heritage-listed former department store at 118 Palmerin Street, Warwick, Southern Downs Region, Queensland, Australia. It was designed by Wallace & Gibson and built from 1910 to 1911 by M Ivory. It is also known as Smith & Miller Furniture Store. It was added to the Queensland Heritage Register on 21 October 1992.

== History ==
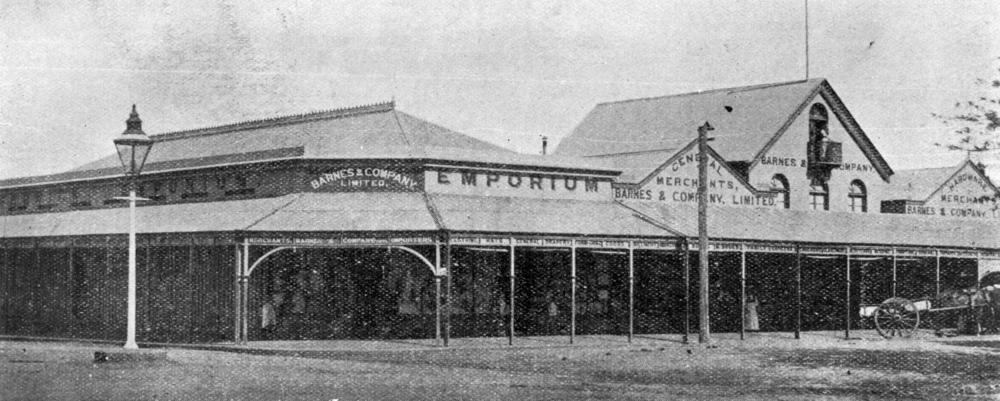
Barnes and Company Limited Emporium Stores, Warwick, 1901

The former Barnes & Co department store, now housing Smith and Miller furniture showroom, situated on the corner of Palmerin and King Streets, Warwick, was constructed in 1910–11 to designs of local Warwick architects, Wallace and Gibson.

The building was described in contemporary reports as a trade palace and was, in fact, a department store. Department stores became popular in England during the mid nineteenth century, assuming the popularity arcades formerly held for would-be purchasers. The new stores were large scale buildings, usually multi-levelled, with impressive architectural edifices raising them to the standards of public monuments. By the First World War the department store flourished as a middle class institution where shoppers were less intimidated and offered a wider variety of goods than were available in traditional exclusive shops.

Barnes & Co in Warwick was typical of many of the early Australian department stores. The company which was known under various names had been merchants in Warwick since 1874 and, in the tradition of many other large stores, considerable expansion and rebuilding occurred resulting in the 1911 building extant today.

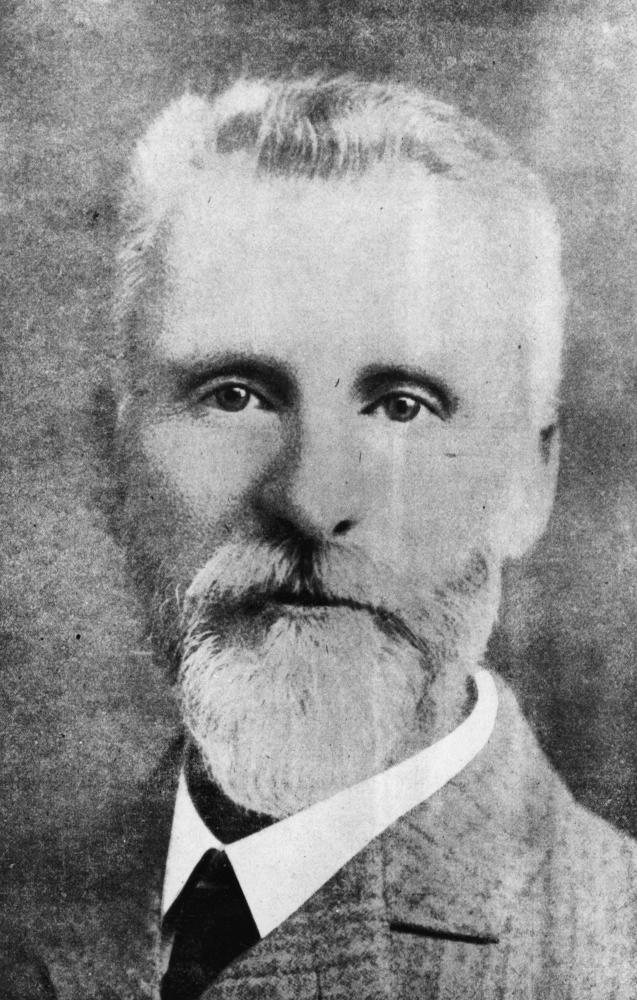
George Powell Barnes, 1907

George Powell Barnes who founded Barnes & Co, was born in 1856 in Castlemaine, Victoria. He was educated in Queensland when his father, a driver employed by Cobb & Co established the Brisbane-Gympie-Maryborough run. George worked as a cashier in various stores in regional Queensland before moving to Warwick in 1878 and opening a store. Early stores on the Darling Downs were a necessity to the farmers; their isolation made contact with potential buyers difficult and stores were able to act as middlemen and ensure the disposal of goods and produce.

A company started in 1880 by George Barnes in association with his brother, Walter Henry Barnes and Mr TF Merry was known as Barnes and Company Limited. Merry was a storekeeper in Toowoomba, with whom George worked earlier and whose daughter, Mary Cecelia was married to George in 1879. Barnes and Co was formed to control businesses in Warwick, Allora, Yangan and Roma Street and Commonwealth Flour Mills at Warwick and South Brisbane.

In 1898 Messrs Wallace & Gibson, local Warwick architects, called tenders for the erection of a business premises located at the corner of Palmerin and Fitzroy streets for Messrs Barnes & Co. This stone building, used as the registered offices of the firm, was constructed on land several blocks to the north of the site of the 1911 Barnes & Co building, and was known as the Emporium. A 1901 description of the business describe Barnes & Co Ltd as general merchants, having departments specially devoted to general drapery, millinery, dressmaking, groceries, crockery, and glassware, furniture, boots and shoes, ironmongery, farmers' produce and agricultural machinery. Another building owned by the firm, in another part of Palmerin Street, was known as the Exchange and was devoted to the selling of agricultural machinery. As before mentioned Barnes & Co were the proprietors of the Commonwealth Flour Mill, located in Wantley Street, Warwick. This was a complex of brick buildings used for the storage of wheat.

The culmination of the Barnes & Co expansion was the opening of their trade palace at the corner of Palmerin and King Streets. The land on which the building stands was acquired by Deed of Grant by William Brown on 23 November 1860 and had many owners until 23 March 1907 when George Powell Barnes bought the site for his new trade palace.

The building was constructed by contractor, Mr M Ivory and cost £9000. When constructed the building was featured in a lengthy report of the Warwick Examiner and Times and described as a distinct and unassailable illustration of the progress and wealth of Warwick and the rich agricultural and grazing belt surrounding it. The store was a large addition to Warwick in 1911, and of not inconsiderable architectural pretension. Externally, well composed facades of tuck pointed brickwork and plaster pilasters and cornices contribute to the quality of the design of the building and this is re-inforced by the internal finishes and detailing including the Wunderlich ceiling, timber joinery and plate glass. A Lamson pneumatic railway system was installed to connect with tubing nineteen points of sale with a cash office at the rear of the store, through which cash and documents could be moved around the building quickly.

Particular attention was given to internal lighting, with Webb & Weston electrical and mechanical engineers consulting on the installation of an electric generator, for lighting and general power. The roof was pierced with several skylights. Internally the plastered walls were kalsomined.

The interior of the former Barnes & Co store seems to have been divided into several smaller departments and a small note in the opening description describes wooden partitions as painted. The ground floor of the shop, with a total of 370 feet (110 m) of plate glass frontage to King and Palmerin Streets, was devoted to various departments, including menswear on the corner of the streets, haberdashery, manchester, furnishing, grocery and crockery and dress departments along the King Street facade and the boot and furniture departments along Palmerin Street. In the upper floor of the store was the ladies' underwear department, the dressmaking and fitting rooms and a staff luncheon room.

The property passed out of the Barnes family in the late 1950s and has been used since that time by various commercial outlets.

== Description ==
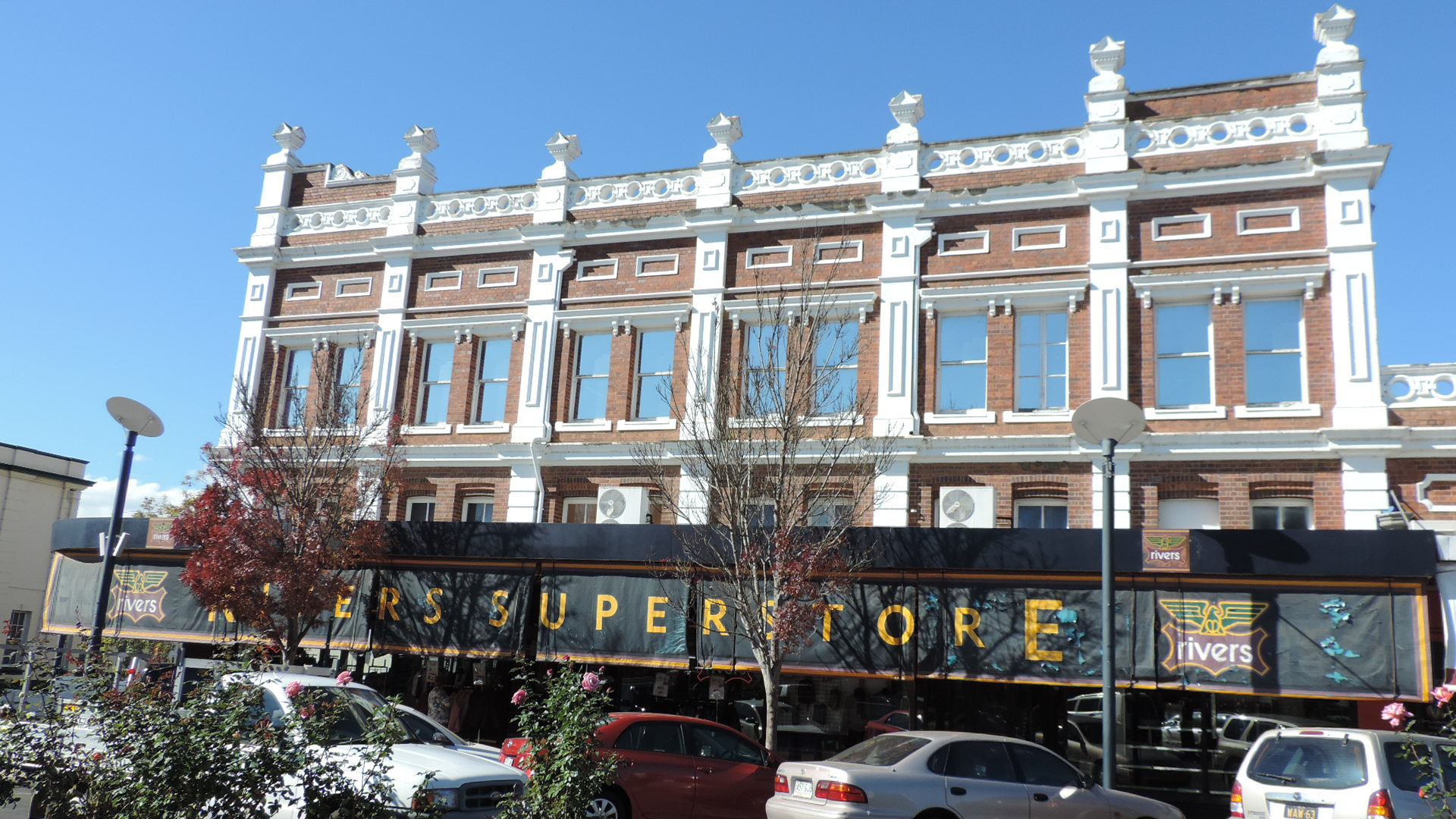
Smith & Miller Building, 2015

The former Barnes & Co. Store is a brick building of one and two storeys situated on the corner of King Street and Palmerin Street, the main street of Warwick. The building has substantial frontages to both streets, with a two-storeyed central corner block which is square in plan, and single-storeyed wings extending both frontages to the east and south. The building is generally of brick, with rendered ornamentation to the street facades, a plate glass shopfront at ground level, a cantilevered awning over and a corrugated iron roof with rooflights. It now houses a furniture and carpet store known as Smith and Miller, and several other retail tenancies.

Each street facade of the two-storeyed corner block is divided into six bays by rendered pilasters. Between is tuck-pointed brickwork and pairs of vertical sliding sash windows with projecting sills and bracketed heads. Above is a projecting cornice, and a parapet with open circular motifs and finials with four-sided triangular pediments, however the finials of the south wing have been removed. The parapet has higher bays in brickwork emphasising the ends and the corner of the two-storey block. The present awning is cantilevered, replacing an earlier posted version, and supports some timber farm relics. Above the awning is a row of small clerestory-like windows with arched brick lintels, which light the ground floor.

The shopfront has large panes of plate glass divided by cast iron column mullions with simple moulded bases and capitals. Behind are circular metal columns supporting the brick facade above. The shopfront is punctuated by a series of truncated recesses leading to the entry doors, which are low-waisted glazed and panelled double doors.

Internally, the ground floor of the central area is a large open space interspersed with columns, apart from a later partitioned office to the south side. It features a high ceiling lined with ornate pressed metal including borders, cornices, roses and beam surrounds, but the volume of the space has been interrupted by the addition of a timber mezzanine level and a steel stair. To the south wall of this central space is a substantial flat-arched opening decorated with a moulded architrave, consoles and a cast-iron column of Corinthian order leading to the adjoining south wing. To the southeast corner is a walk-in safe with a large steel safe door. To the eastern wall is a timber stair with turned balusters and newels. Visible from the interior, at the north western corner of the building is a sandstone column and part walls at the rear of the building, which are believed to be the remnants of a previous building on the site.

The single-storey south wing has been divided by a timber tongue and groove partition wall, separating a retail tenancy. The boarded ceilings have been covered with a later suspended tile ceiling. The east wing is presently under a separate title and was not able to be inspected at the time of writing. It has been divided into retail tenancies with new partitions, ceilings and shopfronts, but above the rooflights and boarded ceilings are still evident.

The first floor of the central area is also an open space with 190-millimetre (7.5 in) stop-chamfered timber posts supporting steel roof beams lined with timber boards. Over the new stair, there is evidence in the tongue and groove ceiling of the former location of the building's lift. To the south-east corner are partitions enclosing the toilets and a caged service hoist. Vertical sliding sash windows continue on those sides not fronting the streets but with less frequency, and from here can be seen the corrugated iron roofs of the single-storey wings. These are a series of parallel hipped structures with gutters between, and rooflights interrupting the ridges. These rooflights are small rectangular pavilions with windows on all four sides, and hipped roofs featuring acroteria to the gutter corners.

The rear of the building, fronting the corner of the laneway, has timber, brick and some stone walls, and a series of lean-to roofs creating some loading areas. From here a timber ramp runs back into the building, past the later partitions of staff toilets and store rooms.

== Heritage listing ==
Barnes and Co. Trading Place was listed on the Queensland Heritage Register on 21 October 1992 having satisfied the following criteria.

The place is important in demonstrating the evolution or pattern of Queensland's history.

The former Barnes & Co store is important is it provides evidence of the growth of Warwick during the early part of the twentieth century. The building demonstrates the development of trading companies and department stores in regional Queensland, and, in particular, the growth in Warwick and district of the prolific firm Barnes & Co.

The place is important in demonstrating the principal characteristics of a particular class of cultural places.

The building is a good example of an early twentieth century regional department store, with evidence of the original layout and previous use of the building with intact shop front and ceilings throughout.

The place is important because of its aesthetic significance.

The building contributes to Palmerin Street which is the principal shopping street in the town and is a substantial well-composed prominent building.

The place has a special association with the life or work of a particular person, group or organisation of importance in Queensland's history.

The building has special associations with a prominent Warwick resident George Barnes.
