= Hiram Barnes =

English-born Australian businessman

Hiram Barnes (19 October 1832 – 24 April 1917) was a Queensland businessman, born in Beckley, Sussex, England noted for his association with Cobb & Co.

== History ==
He came to Australia as a boy with his parents on the Duchess of Northumberland, arriving in Sydney in 1837, attended Staff School, and lived some time in Kissing Point, Sydney then in 1847 moved to Victoria. He joined the gold rush, first to Black Hill, then Forest Creek and Friars Creek, the last of which made him a fortune, and he returned to live with his father in St Kilda. He started a business with three horse teams, carrying between St Kilda, Castlemaine and Bendigo. In 1858 he joined the rush to Rockhampton, Queensland, but was unsuccessful and returned to the carrying business, with Hobby and Hewstead, a competitor to Cobb & Co who shortly took them over. He drove for Cobb & Co, becoming a manager of the Forbes to Orange route, at the time bushranger Ben Hall was active in that region. In 1865 he moved to Queensland, where with partners James Rutherford and John Robertson, he took over the business of John Nolan, who had the mail contract between Brisbane and Ipswich. As an independent branch of Cobb & Co, they took over the businesses of Cook & Fraser, then Mrs Hartley of Jondaryan, so expanding his business out of Toowoomba. Roma and Gympie followed.

Later he was employed by his sons' firm of Barnes and Co. of Brisbane, and lived at Kelvin Grove.

He was a teetotaler member of the Methodist Church and worshipped at the Albert Street Church, and later at the Kelvin Grove Church, where he held responsible official positions. He died in 1917 at the home of his son-in-law, Rev. Robert Kerr, of Toowong, Queensland.

== Literary link ==
One newspaper suggested Barnes as the inspiration for Henry Lawson's depiction of the coach driver "A hundred miles shall see tonight the Lights of Cobb and Co".

== Family ==
His wife predeceased him by a few months. Their children included politicians George Barnes and Walter Barnes.
