= Des Booth =

Australian politician

Member of the Queensland Legislative Assembly for Warwick
- In office 12 November 1977 – 19 September 1992
- Preceded by: David Cory
- Succeeded by: Lawrence Springborg

Personal details
- Born: Desmond James Booth; 20 July 1920 Warwick, Queensland, Australia
- Died: 11 December 1996 (aged 76) Warwick, Queensland, Australia
- Party: National Party
- Spouse: Marie Veronica Brosnan
- Occupation: Dairy farmer

Desmond James Booth (20 July 1920 – 11 December 1996), Australian politician, and dairy farmer and director of a number of agricultural co-operatives and associations prior to election. He was a councillor of the Shire of Glengallan in the Southern Downs region of Queensland, and served with the Australian Imperial Force in New Guinea and the Solomon Islands from 1941 to 1944.

He was elected to the Legislative Assembly of Queensland for Warwick in 1977, representing the National Party, and remained its representative until 1992.

Parliament of Queensland
Preceded by David Cory	Member for Warwick; 1977–1992	Succeeded by Lawrence Springborg
