= David Cory (politician) =

Australian politician (1928–2022)

David Cory AM

Member of the Queensland Legislative Assembly for Warwick
- In office 19 October 1963 – 12 November 1977
- Preceded by: Otto Madsen
- Succeeded by: Des Booth

Personal details
- Born: David Wheatcroft Cory; 3 August 1928 Warwick, Queensland, Australia
- Died: 14 February 2022 (aged 93) Warwick, Queensland, Australia
- Party: Country Party/National Party
- Spouse: Ms Margo Barnes (m.1967)
- Occupation: Farmer

David Wheatcroft Cory AM (3 August 1928 – 14 February 2022) was an Australian politician who was a member of the Queensland Legislative Assembly.

== Biography ==
David Wheatcroft Cory was born in Warwick, Queensland, the son of Fitzroy Cory and his wife Margaret (née Wheatcroft). He was educated at Warwick Central and Intermediate State Schools before attending the Brisbane Grammar School. He became a farmer, working in Swanfels and Warwick.

On 30 June 1967, Cory married Ms. Barnes and together had one son. Cory died in Warwick, Queensland on 14 February 2022, at the age of 93.

== Public life ==
Following the death of Otto Madsen in 1963, Cory won the resulting by-election for the Country Party. He held the seat until the 1977 Queensland state elections when he retired from politics.

Although never a minister during his time in parliament, he held the following roles:

- Member of the Parliamentary Refreshment Room Committee – 1967–1977
- Member of the Government Party Committees on Justice, Primary Industries, Transport, and Lands and Forestry – 1969–1972
- Queensland Delegate to the General Conference of the Commonwealth Parliamentary Association in Canberra – 1970
- Queensland Delegate to the General Conference of the Commonwealth Parliamentary Association in Kuala Lumpur – 1971
- Member of the Government Party Committees on Development and Industrial Affairs, Primary Industries, and Transport – 1972–1974
- Delegate to the Australian Constitutional Convention – 1972 and 1973
- Member of the Queensland Parliamentary Delegation to Japan and South-East Asia – 1973
- Member of the Queensland Trade Delegation to the Middle East – 1975

Cory was also Chairman of the Warwick Branch of the Graziers Association of South-East Queensland from 1961 to 1965.

Cory was made a Member of the Order of Australia (AM) in the 2004 Australia Day Honours for "service to the environment, particularly in the areas of rural lands protection in Queensland, and through animal, weed and pest management".

Parliament of Queensland
Preceded by Otto Madsen	Member for Warwick; 1963–1977	Succeeded by Des Booth
