= Otto Madsen =

Australian politician

The Honourable Otto Madsen

Member of the Queensland Legislative Assembly for Warwick
- In office 3 May 1947 – 3 Aug 1963
- Preceded by: John Healy
- Succeeded by: David Cory

Personal details
- Born: Otto Ottosen Madsen; 8 December 1904 Warwick, Queensland, Australia
- Died: 3 August 1963 (aged 58) Brisbane, Queensland, Australia
- Party: Country Party
- Spouse: Nellie Inis Evans (m.1924 d.1935)
- Relations: Mick Madsen (brother)
- Occupation: Dairy farmer

Otto Ottosen Madsen (8 December 1904 – 3 August 1963) was a member of the Queensland Legislative Assembly.

== Biography ==
Madsen was born in Warwick, Queensland, the son of Mads Madsen and his wife Christine (née Ottosen), both of whom were born in Denmark. His brother, Mick Madsen, played rugby league for Australia. Otto was educated at Tannymorel State School and Warwick State High School before attending the Warwick Technical College. He became a dairy farmer, working in Tannymorel, Killarney, and Yangan.

On 11 September 1924, Madsen married Nellie Inis Evans (died 1935) and together had two sons and two daughters. He died in Brisbane in August 1963 and accorded a state funeral.

== Public life ==
Madsen won the seat of Warwick at the 1947 Queensland state elections, defeating the sitting member, John Healy of the Labor Party. He held the seat until his death in 1963.

During his time in parliament he held the following ministerial portfolios:

- Minister for Agriculture and Stock - 1957–1960
- Minister for Public Lands and Irrigation - 1960
- Minister for Agriculture and Forestry - 1960–1963

Madsen was also a councilor on the Shire of Glengallan in 1942. He was President of the Dairymen's Organisation and Eastern Downs District Council, and Deputy State President and Queensland Representative on the Australian Dairy Farmers Federation.

Parliament of Queensland
Preceded by John Healy	Member for Warwick; 1947–1963	Succeeded by David Cory
