= John Healy (Australian politician) =

Australian politician

Member of the Queensland Legislative Assembly for Warwick
- In office 11 May 1935 – 3 May 1947
- Preceded by: George Barnes
- Succeeded by: Otto Madsen

Personal details
- Born: John Joseph O'Connor Healy; 19 March 1894 Maryborough, Queensland, Australia
- Died: 18 July 1970 (aged 76) Brisbane, Queensland, Australia
- Resting place: South Brisbane Cemetery
- Party: Labor
- Spouse: Florence May Ahern (m.1921)
- Occupation: Clerk

John Joseph O'Connor Healy (19 March 1894 – 18 July 1970) was a member of the Queensland Legislative Assembly in Australia.

== Biography ==
Healy was born in Maryborough, Queensland, the son of John Edward James Healy and his wife Margaret (née O'Connor). He was educated at St Mary's Convent, Yuleba State School, Assumption College in Warwick and Nudgee College in Brisbane. On leaving school he took up work as a clerk with the Queensland Railways in Warwick from 1908 until 1935.

After politics he was a clerk in the Queensland Public Service before being the Private Secretary from 1950–1956 to Paul Hilton, the Minister for Works in the Queensland Government. In 1956 he was once again working as a clerk, this time in the Valuer-General's department. He retired in 1961.

On 5 October 1921, Healy married Florence May Ahern and together had two sons and a daughter. He died in Brisbane in July 1970 and was buried in the South Brisbane Cemetery.

== Public life ==
After unsuccessfully standing for the seat of Warwick at the 1932 Queensland state elections, Healy, a member of the Labor Party, stood again three years later and this time was victorious. He went on to represent the electorate of Warwick for the next 12 years, only to lose to Otto Madsen of the Country Party in 1947.

Healy was recommended by the Queensland Central Executive of the Labor Party to contest the seat of Roma at the 1950 Queensland state elections, but the Labour in Politics Convention opted to endorse opponent J. D. Kane instead.

Parliament of Queensland
Preceded by George Barnes	Member for Warwick; 1935–1947	Succeeded by Otto Madsen
