= George Barnes (Australian politician) =

Australian politician (1856-1949)

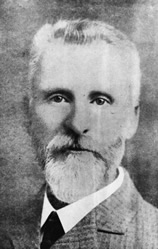

Member of the Queensland Legislative Assembly for Warwick
- In office 5 February 1908 – 11 May 1935
- Preceded by: Thomas O'Sullivan
- Succeeded by: John Healy

Personal details
- Born: George Powell Barnes; 20 September 1856 Castlemaine, Colony of Victoria
- Died: 9 December 1949 (aged 93) Brisbane, Queensland, Australia
- Resting place: Warwick Cemetery
- Party: Ministerialist
- Other political affiliations: Liberal Party, National Party, Country and Progressive National Party
- Spouse: Mary Cecilia Merry (m.1879 d.1942)
- Relations: Hiram Barnes (father), Walter Barnes (brother)
- Occupation: Businessman

George Powell Barnes (20 September 1856 – 9 December 1949), generally referred to by his full name or as "George P. Barnes", (Note: Most likely to distinguish him in newspaper reports from his contemporary, the prominent British parliamentarian George Barnes.) was a Queensland businessman and politician.

== Early life ==
George was a son of Cobb and Co. pioneer Hiram Barnes and a brother of Walter Barnes MLA.

== Business interests ==
George Barnes started the company Barnes and Company Limited in 1880 in association with his brother, Walter Henry Barnes and Mr TF Merry. Merry was a storekeeper in Toowoomba, with whom George worked earlier and whose daughter, Mary Cecelia was married to George in 1879. Barnes and Co was formed to control businesses in Warwick, Allora, Yangan and Roma Street and Commonwealth Flour Mills at Warwick and South Brisbane.

He was a leading figure in the Warwick Methodist Church and the Warwick Ambulance Brigade.

== Politics ==
He was member for Warwick for 27 years, from 1908 to 1935, when he retired.

== Family ==
He married Mary Cecilia Merry (ca.1858 – 3 October 1942) of Bulimba, Queensland in 1879. She was active in the local Methodist Church, Red Cross Society and Benevolent Society; they had a home "Glen Lyn" in Warwick.

A son, Franklin George Barnes (ca.1883 – ) was a mining engineer who devised and patented a method for degaussing British ships to counter the threat of magnetic mines in the early days of World War II.

Another son, Cecil Merry Barnes, lost his life savings when his company, Barnes Ltd. of Fortitude Valley was forced into liquidation. G. P. Barnes felt his son's failure acutely, and personally paid out the company's preference shareholders.

== Legacy ==
The former Barnes and Co. Trading Place in Warwick is listed on the Queensland Heritage Register.

== Notes ==
Parliament of Queensland
Preceded by Thomas O'Sullivan	Member for Warwick; 1908–1935	Succeeded by John Healy
