= Wynnum Wading Pool =

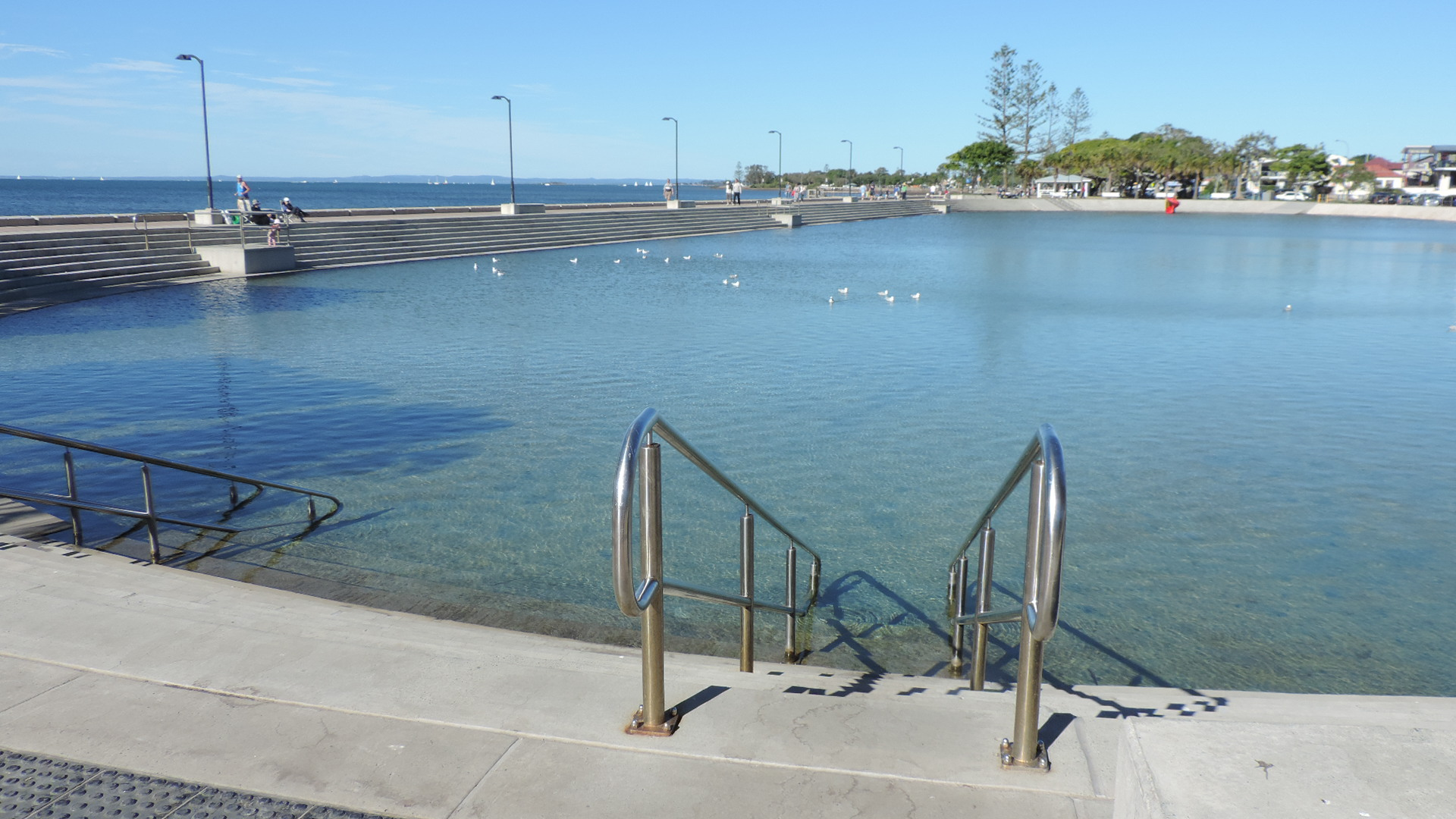
- Wynnum Wading Pool with Moreton Bay beyond, 2014

- Location within Queensland
- 27.4421°S 153.1772°E
- Location: The Esplanade, Wynnum, City of Brisbane, Queensland, Australia

History
- Design period: 1919–1930s (interwar period)
- Built: 1932–1932

Queensland Heritage Register
- Official name: Wynnum Wading Pool Reserve, Manly Wading Pool
- Type: state heritage (built)
- Designated: 5 October 1998
- Reference no.: 602040
- Significant period: 1932 (fabric); 1932–ongoing (social)
- Significant components: trees/plantings, swimming pool, memorial – fountain, jetty/pier

Wynnum Wading Pool is a heritage-listed tidal pool on the foreshore of Moreton Bay at The Esplanade, Wynnum, City of Brisbane, Queensland, Australia. The shallow oval-shaped pool was built in 1932 by relief workers during the Great Depression and opened to the public in 1933. It is also known as Manly Wading Pool and Wynnum Wading Pool Reserve. It was added to the Queensland Heritage Register on 5 October 1998.

== History ==
The Wynnum Wading Pool Reserve was constructed in 1932 by relief workers and is a shallow tidal pool with concrete walls and a sandy bottom.

=== Background ===
The first European settlement of the Wynnum–Manly area of Moreton Bay occurred in the 1860s when two sugar mills, Lota and Wyvernleigh were established. The area soon became popular with holiday makers, and holiday homes were constructed along the bay. In 1882 land sales of the Manly Beach Estate (named after the coastal Sydney suburb) were held, giving the area its present name. The completion of the Cleveland railway line in 1889 provided further impetus for the development of the area as a seaside resort, although the area maintained its connections with the fishing industry. By the late 1920s, access to the area was possible by rail, bus or road, further increasing its popularity as a resort and also as a permanent place of residence for Brisbane businessmen and their families.

Prior to the construction of the wading pool, swimming had taken place in the sea or in the swimming pools which were attached to the various public jetties. The still waters of Moreton Bay were preferred over the exposed beaches with large waves. The fear of shark attacks and being stung by jellyfish remained even in the waters of the bay. Enclosures for safe swimming existed along the Brisbane River and at Sandgate.

In 1922, Alderman J. Patterson presented a scheme that included the building of a bund wall at low water mark using dredgings from Wynnum Creek to reclaim land for use as recreational purposes, including a pool. During the Great Depression, the Government of Queensland established the Bureau of Industry to fund public works and provide unemployment relief. The Queensland Government paid the wages of workers and the council provided the materials. Those on "The Susso" were assigned work based on their family circumstances. A man with a wife and one child would work a three-day week and receive 27/- a week. The Wynnum Wading Pool Reserve was constructed by the Brisbane City Council, as part of the Unemployment Relief System. The Council took advantage of this scheme to complete a number of projects in the Wynnum Manly area, including the Manly Retaining Wall.

=== Construction ===
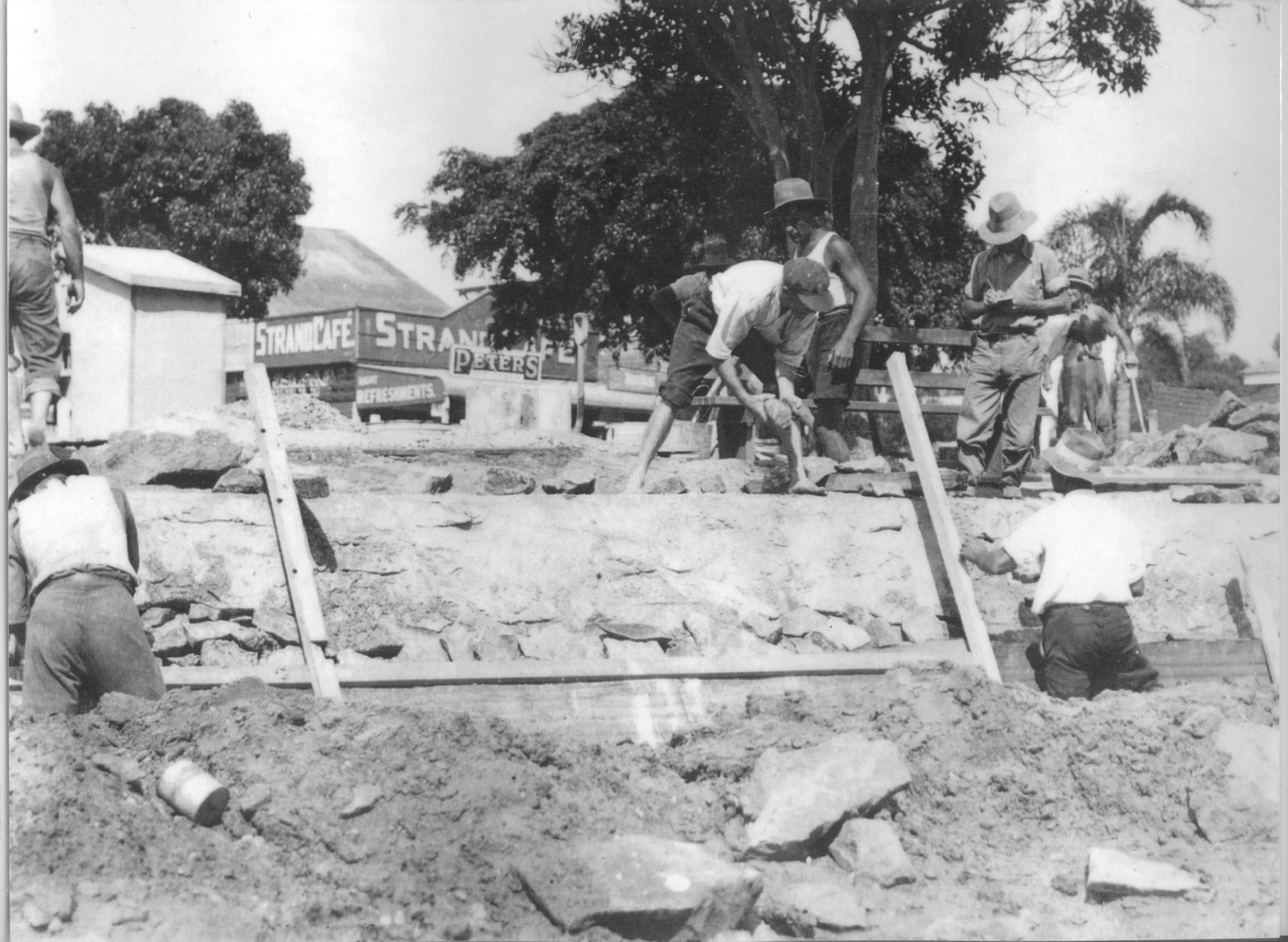
Workers repairing the Wading Pool wall Wynnum, 1935

Construction of the wading pool began in 1932 at a spot where there was a small indentation known as the saltpan. The parkland was reclaimed from the sea, a revetment wall was built and backfilled, and an area left empty to create the tidal pool. The pool was created by the construction of a concrete sea wall beyond the high water mark, with little excavation required. This wall creates a barrier between the pool and Moreton Bay and also provides a promenade along the foreshore of the Bay. Three pipes are located along the length of the wall, through which water flows at high tide. Flood gates are then closed to prevent the water from receding at low tide. This process is carried out fortnightly and the bottom is cleared of any build up of silt at the same time.

The pool is around 128 by 54 metres (420 by 177 ft) with automatic valves to maintain the maximum water depth from the tide at 75 centimetres (30 in). It has a sandy bottom, five shallow steps on three sides, a concrete ramp and a slippery slide. Hundreds of people attended the official opening on 21 January 1933 and witnessed the sailing event of 10 footers arranged for the occasion. The installation of floodlights allowed bathing on hot nights. Installation of flood lighting also occurred before the summer season of 1933, presumably to allow for night time use.

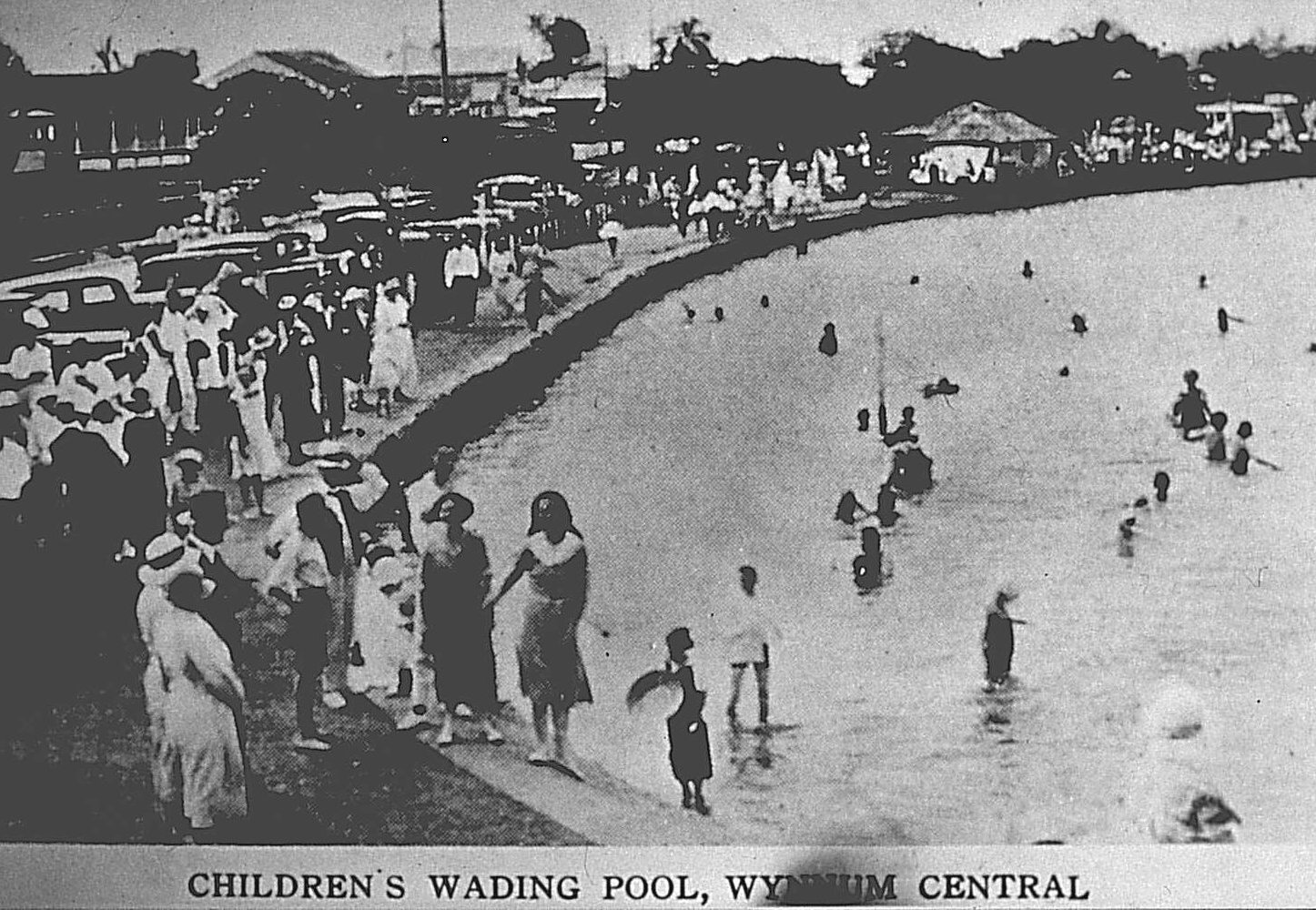
Enjoying the pool

It seems that few alterations have been made to the pool since its original construction, although alterations have recently been carried out on the surrounding area to provide change rooms and a barbecue area, as well as a white sandy beach. The pool has been popular with both locals and visitors since its inception in 1932. It remains in use for most of the year, by swimmers in the summer months and by model boat enthusiasts during winter.

On 13 July 2008, the wading pool was re-opened by Brisbane Lord Mayor Campbell Newman after a A$6.5 million upgrade.

== Description ==
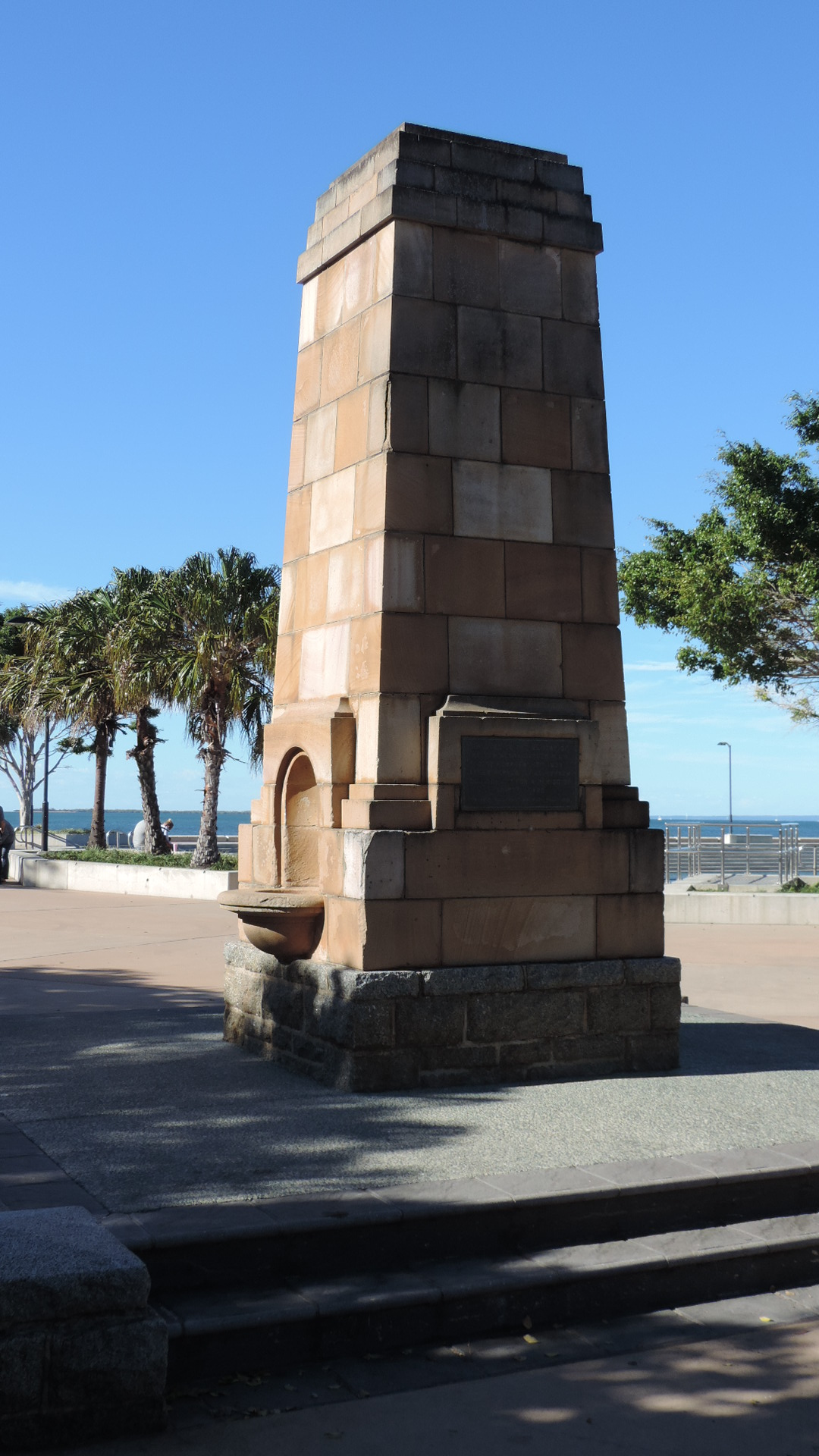
Memorial to Walter Barnes, 2014

The Wynnum Wading Pool Reserve is located in a recreational reserve on the foreshore of Moreton Bay. The Wynnum jetty extends into the bay to the north of the pool and barbecue areas are located at either end of the pool. The area at the northern end has been refurbished to include showers, change rooms, toilets, a play area and a white sandy beach known as Pandanus Beach. Trees are planted along the foreshore and at either end of the pool and include pines, bauhinia and figs. A memorial to Walter Barnes, MLA for Bulimba and Wynnum, in the form of a sandstone drinking fountain is also located at the northern end of the pool.

The pool is a large oval shape measuring 128 by 54 metres (420 ft × 177 ft), with a depth at the centre of approximately 750 millimetres (30 in). Separated from the bay by a narrow concrete path, it is constructed of concrete with a natural compacted clay base which is covered with fresh sand fortnightly. It has five shallow steps surrounding the edges on all sides except that closest to the road. A concrete ramp provides additional access at the south-western corner of the pool and a slippery slide is located in the northern end of the pool. Two depth indicators are located at either end of the pool.

The pool contains salt water which enters the pool through three concrete pipes at high tide when flood gates retain the water. The pipes have mesh across them to prevent sea life entering the pool.

Vegetation in the surrounding park area includes pine, bauhinia and fig trees.

== Heritage listing ==
Wynnum Wading Pool Reserve was listed on the Queensland Heritage Register on 5 October 1998.

The Wynnum Wading Pool Reserve is demonstrative of a government scheme which was implemented to assist the unemployed throughout Queensland. It was constructed in 1932 under the Unemployment Relief Scheme which was implemented in the same year as a means of generating work projects for the unemployed during the Depression of the 1930s.

The Wynnum Wading Pool Reserve is a rare example of early wading pool technology of this type in Queensland.

The Wynnum Wading Pool Reserve is a rare example of early wading pool technology of this type in Queensland.

It is also of aesthetic significance due to the surrounding landscape and its siting adjacent to Moreton Bay.

The Wynnum Wading Pool Reserve is a rare example of early wading pool technology of this type in Queensland.

Well known and utilised by local residents and visitors, the place has strong association with many community groups and is significant as a park complex and for its social history.

== See also ==
- History of Brisbane
