= Herbert Rahmann =

Australian cricketer (1886–1957)

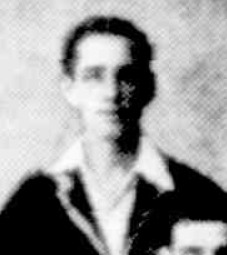

Personal information
- Full name: Herbert William Rahmann
- Born: 23 August 1886; Maryborough, Queensland, Australia
- Died: 12 October 1957 (aged 71); Brisbane, Queensland, Australia
- Batting: Right-handed
- Bowling: Right-arm medium
- Role: All-rounder

Domestic team information
- Years: Team
- 1924/25: Queensland

Career statistics
| Competition | First-class |
|---|---|
| Matches | 1 |
| Runs scored | 19 |
| Batting average | – |
| 100s/50s | 0/0 |
| Top score | 19* |
| Balls bowled | 88 |
| Wickets | 0 |
| Bowling average | – |
| 5 wickets in innings | – |
| 10 wickets in match | – |
| Best bowling | – |
| Catches/stumpings | 0/– |
- Source: Cricinfo, 6 October 2020

Herbert Rahmann (23 August 1886 – 12 October 1957) was an Australian cricketer. He played in one first-class match for Queensland in 1924/25, and played for University in Brisbane Grade Cricket from 1921 to 1926. In his career he was a teacher and went on to train teachers and served as Inspector of Schools for Queensland.

== Education and early career ==
Rahmann attended a School of Arts in Maryborough and in 1899 he won a certificate for academic merit in physics. In 1900 he graduated primary school and received a scholarship to study at any Grammar School in Queensland free of charge, and he enrolled in Maryborough Boys Grammar School, receiving a medal for arithmetic in 1902.

As of 1907 he had graduated and become an assistant teacher working on probation at Irvinebank State School, and in 1911 he was admitted to the Department of Public Instruction as a full teacher. In January 1912 he moved from Irvinebank to Manly State School as an assistant teacher, and in August he moved to Warwick High School as assistant teacher. In 1915 he was promoted from a Class III division 1 teacher to a Class II division 3 teacher, and transferred to Gympie High. In January 1916 Rahmann married Effie Winifred Marquis in Christ Church in Bundaberg and they took the evening train to Gympie after the service.

At some point the Rahmann's moved to Brisbane where they had a daughter, Marjorie, in 1920, and a son, John in 1925, and Rahmann became officer-in-charge of evening classes at the teachers' training college by 1926.

== Cricket career ==
Rahmann had played cricket in Maryborough in his youth and earned a reputation as a good batsman and after moving to Brisbane he joined the club University in Brisbane Grade Cricket in September 1921. In February 1924 he was described as one of university's "destroying angels" with the ball in a match report, and in the 1923–24 season he took 18 wickets at an average of 21.88 which was the most for University.

In December 1924 Rahmann was selected in the Queensland First-class side to travel to the southern states over the New Year holidays and a report on his selection noted he had bowled very long spells for University in the grade season so he was unlikely to break down during a First-class game, and he was noted as having potential to succeed at state level. He played in one First-class game against New South Wales on the tour and while he did not take a wicket he achieved some notice the bat, despite batting at number 11, with a short partnership with Norman Beeston scoring 19 not out. His University teammate and Queensland state player Cecil Thompson noted in a report that Rahmann was a good batsman as well as a bowler and should have played for Queensland earlier.

Rahmann continued playing for University until the end of the 1925–26 season, however it was reported in September 1926 that his future in cricket was uncertain and he did not play in grade cricket again.

== Later education career ==
Rahmann resigned from his position with the Teachers' Training College in Brisbane in 1928 and he was given a warm farewell, and as of March 1929 he was working as a teacher again at Newmarket State School. In 1930 he had a son, William, and returned to the Teachers' Training College in Brisbane to serve on an Institute for Educational Research, and his old position as officer-in-charge of evening classes.

In December 1933 Rahmann was appointed as an acting District Inspector of State Schools for Queensland starting from 1 January 1934. He travelled extensively in the role inspecting Irvinebank, where he had taught twenty years earlier, in March 1934, Aloomba State School in May, and all schools in the Tully District in September. He continued traveling extensively in the role until at least 1937, and served as Inspector of Schools for Queensland until retiring in 1953.
