= Manly Retaining Wall =

Historic embankment in Brisbane, Queensland

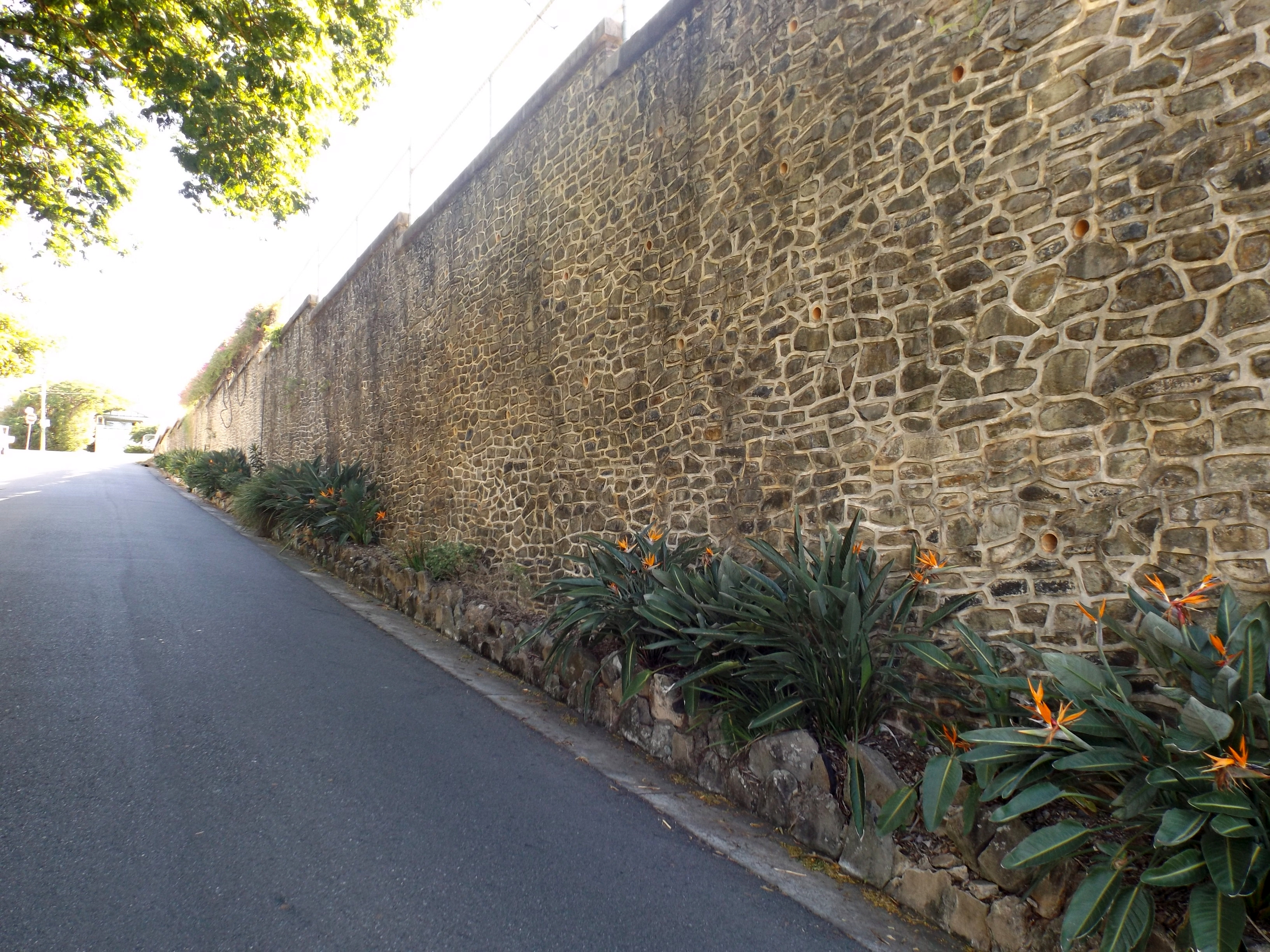
- Structure in 2015

- Location within Queensland Location within Australia
- 27.4583°S 153.1864°E
- Location: Falcon Street, Manly, City of Brisbane, Queensland, Australia

History
- Design period: 1919 - 1930s (interwar period)
- Built: 1933

Site notes
- Architect: Eneas Fraser Gilchrist

Queensland Heritage Register
- Official name: Manly Retaining Wall, The Great Wall of Manly
- Type: state heritage (built)
- Designated: 5 October 1998
- Reference no.: 602039
- Significant period: 1930s (fabric)
- Significant components: steps/stairway, sculpture
- Builders: Relief work

Manly Retaining Wall is a heritage-listed embankment at Falcon Street, Manly, City of Brisbane, Queensland, Australia. It was designed by engineer Eneas Fraser Gilchrist and built in 1933 by relief workers. It is also known as The Great Wall of Manly. It was added to the Queensland Heritage Register on 5 October 1998.

== History ==
The Manly Retaining Wall is located at the corner of Falcon (formerly known as Spring) and Wellington Streets, forming a cutting in the centre of each road. It was constructed in 1933 and comprises irregularly shaped stones which were quarried at Lytton, bedded in concrete.

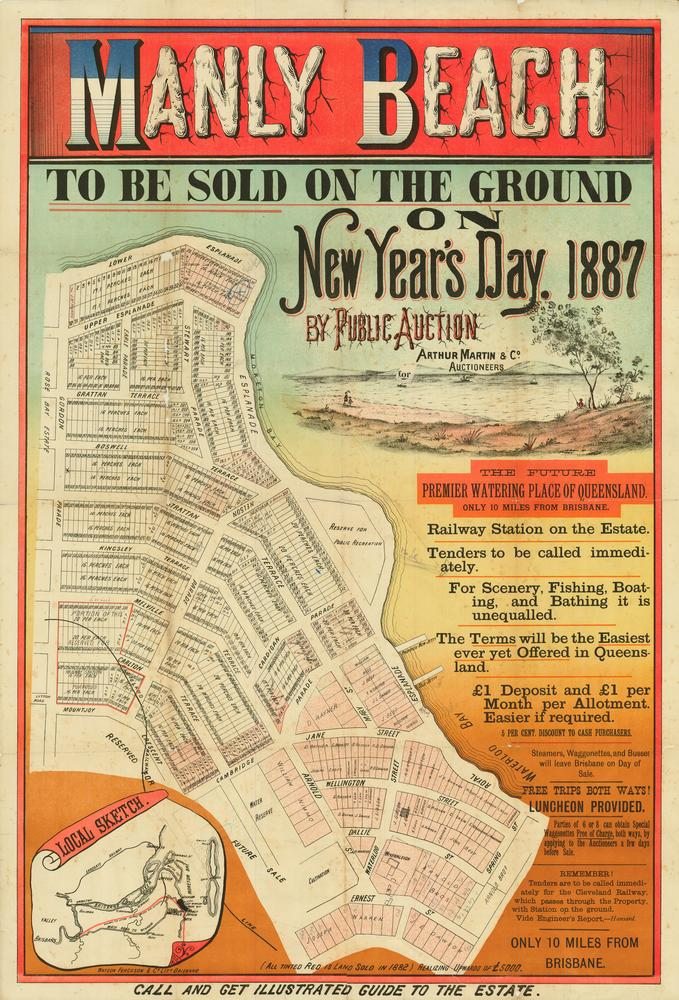
Manly Beach Estate map, 1887

The first European settlement of the Wynnum-Manly area of Moreton Bay occurred in the 1860s when two sugar mills, Lota and Wyvernleigh were established. The area soon became popular with holiday makers, and holiday homes were constructed along the bay. In 1882 land sales of the Manly Beach Estate (named after the coastal Sydney suburb of Manly) were held, giving the area its present name. The completion of the railway in 1889 provided further impetus for the development of the area as a seaside resort, although the area maintained its connections with the fishing industry. By the late 1920s, access to the area was possible by rail, bus or road, further increasing its popularity as a resort and also as a permanent place of residence for Brisbane businessmen and their families.

Street layouts in the area of the retaining wall form a meandering pattern due to the original estate surveys and also the irregular topography. In some places, the slope to the bay was so steep that the road was divided in two to allow access to houses located on either side of the road.

Falcon Street is an example of this. It was originally divided by an embankment which was so high and wide that it restricted access for two way traffic. A retaining wall to replace the embankment was much needed; however the cost of construction would have been more than the surrounding properties were worth. The initiative of the Brisbane City Council District Engineer for Wynnum in applying for relief labour made the wall a financial possibility.

The Unemployment Relief Scheme was introduced by the Queensland Government in 1932 as a means of providing work projects for the unemployed during the Great Depression of the 1930s. The Brisbane City Council took advantage of this scheme to construct the retaining wall, providing tools and materials whilst the Queensland Government provided the labour. Other structures in the area, including similar retaining walls and the Wynnum Wading Pool Reserve were also constructed under the relief scheme.

The wall was an ambitious project. It is approximately 200 metres (660 ft) long and meets foundation pressures ranging from 1.5 long tons (1.5 t) per square foot to 4 long tons (4.1 t) per square foot. Because of the clay formation of the soil, the foundations of the wall were critical. A plan for the wall was produced by the City Engineer's office in February 1933, and is signed by the Designing Engineer and the City Engineer, Eneas Fraser Gilchrist. On site calculations are said to have been made "with the aid of a piece of 4 x 4 placed on end in the clay and loaded with concrete blocks".

Due to the labour being supplied by the relief scheme, a variety of workers were employed on the project, including an unknown artists who formed figures within the concrete plaster pointing. These figures include kangaroos, emus, boomerangs and human heads, one of which is apparently a likeness of the District Engineer in charge of works.

The wall is a locally well-known feature of the area and is included in the Brisbane City Council's heritage walk booklet under the local name of "the Great Wall of Manly".

== Description ==
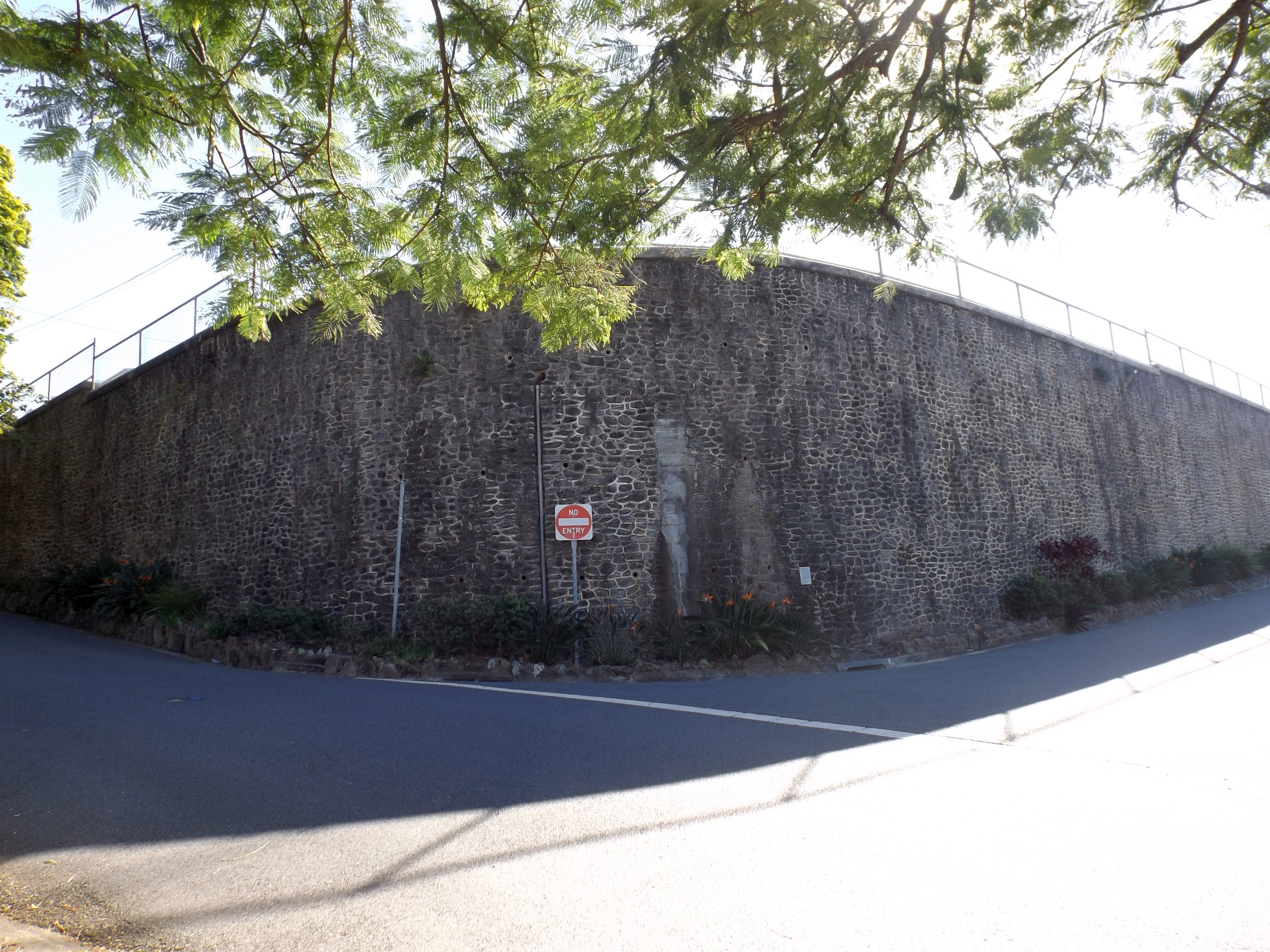
Central corner, 2015

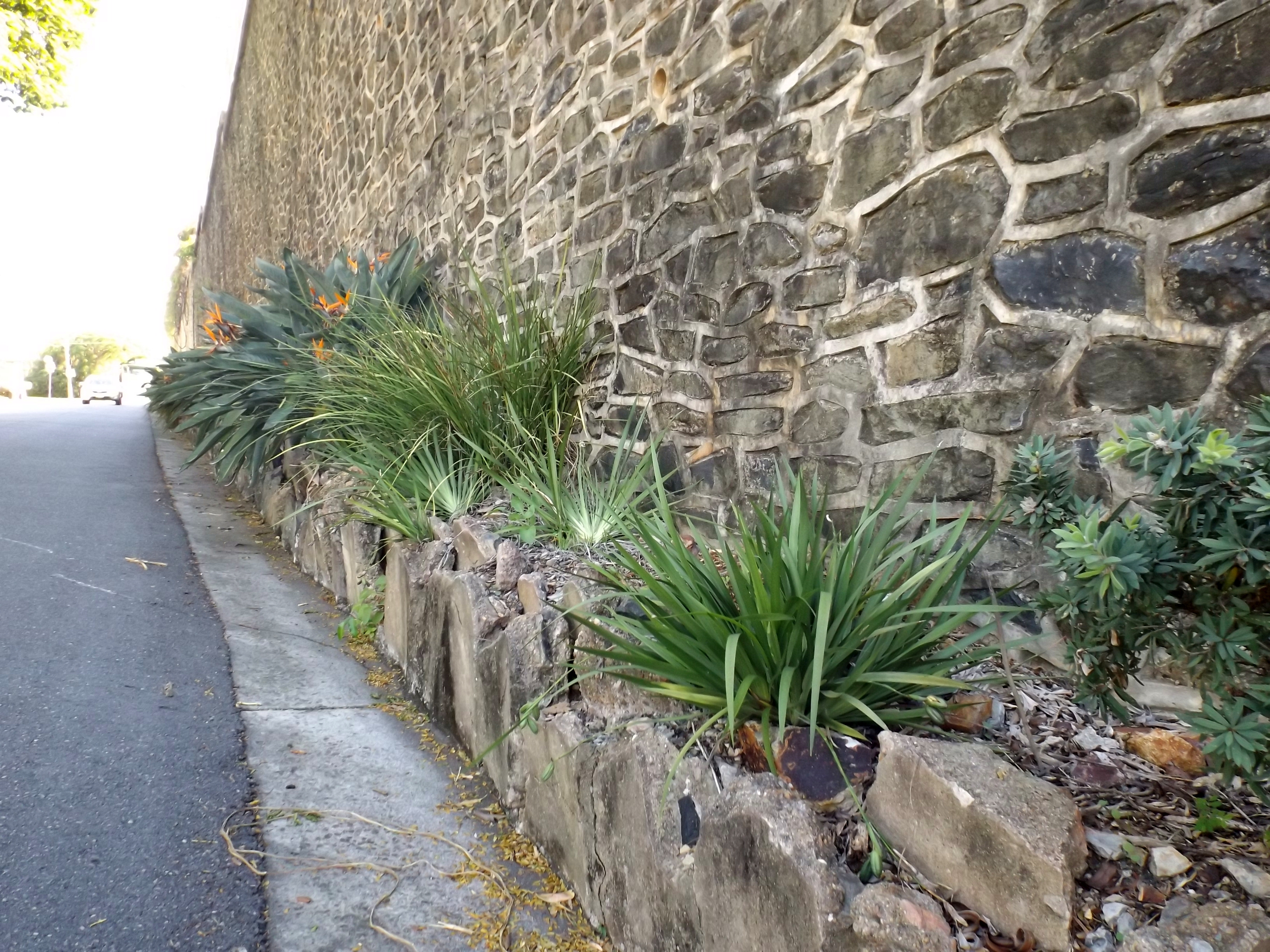
Plantings at the base of the wall, 2015

The Manly Retaining Wall is located at the corner of Wellington and Falcon Streets and divides both streets down the centre, forming two levels of access. At the intersection of the two streets the wall is approximately 7 metres (23 ft) high. It extends approximately 100 metres (330 ft) along both streets, tapering towards the ends to follow the incline of each street. Concrete steps are located at the end of the wall on Wellington Street, providing access to the upper level.

The wall sits on a concrete base, 3 feet (0.91 m) high and is constructed of basalt blue metal stone which was quarried at nearby Lytton. The wall has a backing of 9 inches (230 mm) of dry stone packing behind the rear face (embedded in the cutting) which steps from 8 feet 3 inches (2.51 m) at the widest part of the base to 12 inches (300 mm) at the top. The front face is straight and is capped with a cement coping, 12 inches (300 mm) wide.

The individual stones are irregular in form and size and are laid in a random pattern. Each block is bedded in concrete and the joints are heavily pointed with cement plaster. In various places, the plaster has been formed into shapes depicting Australian native animals, including kangaroos, emus, goannas, and also human heads and boomerangs.

== Heritage listing ==
Manly Retaining Wall was listed on the Queensland Heritage Register on 5 October 1998 having satisfied the following criteria.

The place is important in demonstrating the evolution or pattern of Queensland's history.

The Manly Retaining Wall is demonstrative of a government scheme which was implemented to assist the unemployed throughout Queensland. It was constructed in 1933 under the Unemployment Relief Scheme which was implemented in the previous year as a means of generating work projects for the unemployed during the Depression of the 1930s.

The place is important because of its aesthetic significance.

Due to its size, the Manly Retaining Wall is a prominent landmark in the area. The random pattern of the stonework and the substantial concrete pointing which includes animal figures such as a kangaroo, emu and goanna also contributes to the aesthetic significance of the place.

The place is important in demonstrating a high degree of creative or technical achievement at a particular period.

The Manly Retaining Wall demonstrates technical achievement and is a notable engineering accomplishment incorporating high quality of workmanship.

The place has a strong or special association with a particular community or cultural group for social, cultural or spiritual reasons.

Known locally as "The Great Wall of Manly", and included in the Brisbane City Council's Heritage Trail for Wynnum-Manly, the place has strong associations with the local community.
