= Manly State School =

Public primary school in Queensland, Australia

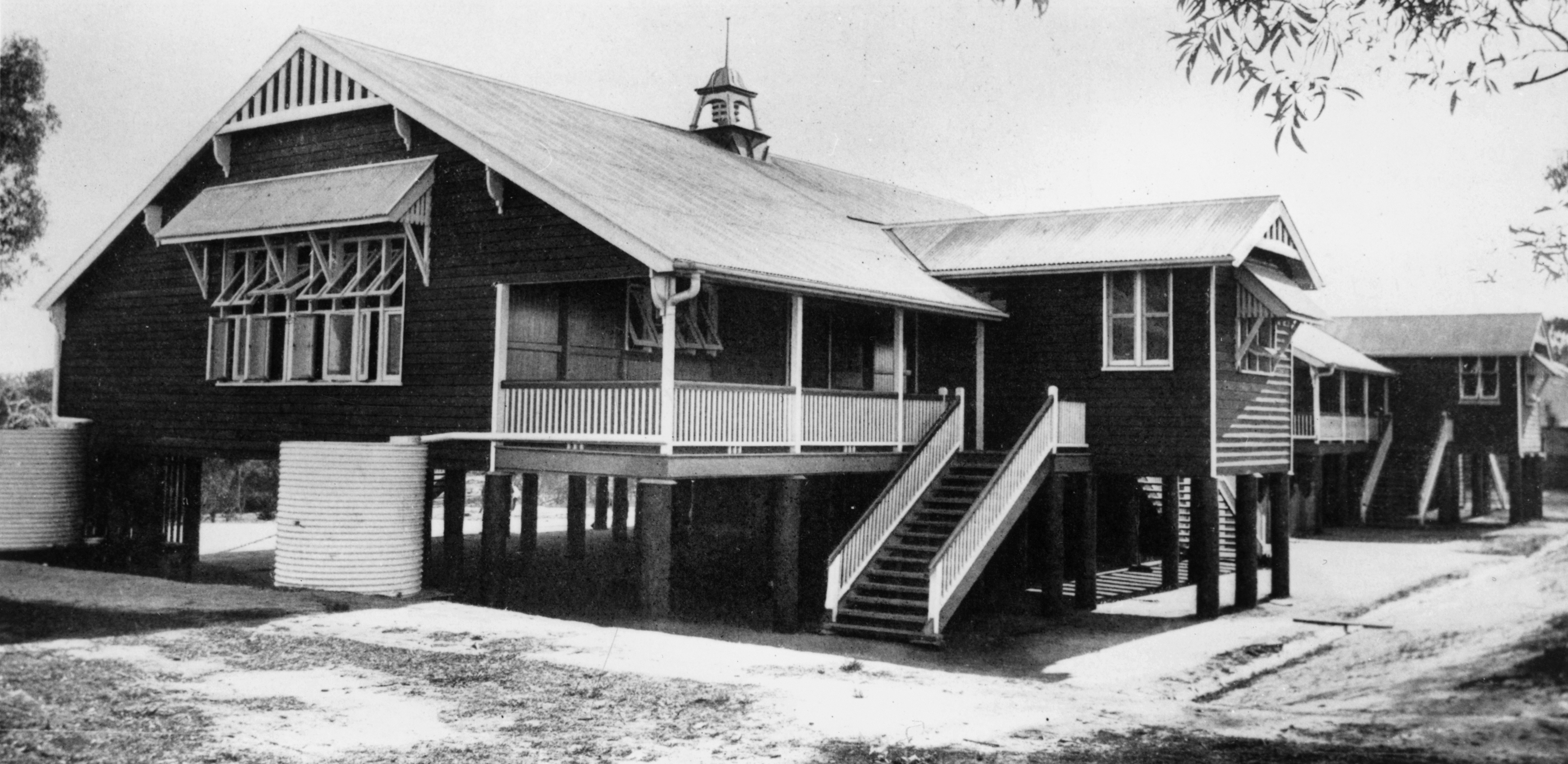
- Manly State School, 1914

Location
- 63 Ernest Street, Manly, Queensland, Australia
- Coordinates: 27.4581°S 153.1813°E

Information
- School type: Public
- Motto: Play the Game
- Established: 1910
- Principal: Clayton Carnes
- Years offered: Prep – Year 6
- Enrollment: 671 (2023)
- Colors: Orange; Dark Blue; White
- Website: Official site

Manly State School is a public co-educational primary school located in the Brisbane suburb of Manly, Queensland, Australia. It is administered by the Queensland Department of Education, with an enrolment of 671 students and a teaching staff of 48, as of 2023. The school serves students from Prep to Year 6. It was placed on the Brisbane Heritage Register as a Local Heritage Place on 1 January 2004 due to providing education to children within the region since the 1910s.

== History ==
The local community began advocating for a school within the region in 1907; the community sought out the deputation of the Minister of Public Instruction (the Education Department), but he was unable to agree to the request, but he did agree to assist in the purchase of the land for the school site. The school was approved and built in 1909, despite protests from the residents of Wynnum, who did not want another school in the area (the Wynnum school had opened in 1894). A picnic was held in January 1909 to help raise funds for the school.

The school opened on 4 July 1910 with 120 students enrolled; approximately 300 people were present at the opening ceremony. By 1913, enrollment had surged to 320, prompting urgent calls for additional accommodations. In response, both the Minister of Works and the Minister for Public Instruction visited the school to evaluate the situation. It was noted that 'it is understood that the matter will be given careful consideration.' In 1914, the capacity had forced the construction of a second classroom. More classrooms were added as the school's enrollment increased due to the suburb of Manly becoming more densely populated.

The school celebrated the coronation of King George V by assembling and unveiling the Union Jack, which was gifted to the school by the Education Department. A flagpole was also donated to the school during this event.

The school was closed for a short period in 1917 due to an outbreak of diphtheria in the Manly district. All 372 students and 13 teachers were tested for the disease. It was stated that the school would not reopen until the results of the test were disclosed. The results of the test identified that 23 students were carrying the disease. The school was reopened on Thursday, 19 April 1917, with the infected students being excluded from school until three successful swabbing tests came back negative. Another outbreak occurred during November 1926, with 22 students carrying the disease, but only one official case. They were quickly isolated to protect the public. One case was fatal.

Additional land for the school was sought out by the school committee in 1926.

In 1929, it was stated that out of the 120 schools within the district at the time, Manly State School was one of the leading. There were 700 students on the school role and electric lighting had been installed in the teacher's room at this time.

In November 1953, the head teacher at the time, William Harris, died suddenly. He was the head teacher from 1945 until June 1953.

Six children were attacked by a savage dog during lunch time in 1956. The dog was shot by police.

The school's centenary occurred in 2010, being celebrated with the opening of more new and refurbished buildings.

In December 2023, the roof of the school hall was blown off during a severe storm.

== Demographics ==
In 2021, the school had a student enrollment of 707 with 48 teachers (43 full-time equivalent) and 28 non-teaching staff (18 full-time equivalent). Female enrollments consisted of 360 students and Male enrollments consisted of 347 students; Indigenous enrollments accounted for a total of 4% and 14% of students had a language background other than English.

In 2022, the school had a student enrollment of 686 with 48 teachers (42.8 full-time equivalent) and 29 non-teaching staff (18.9 full-time equivalent). Female enrollments consisted of 338 students and Male enrollments consisted of 348 students; Indigenous enrollments accounted for a total of 2% and 14% of students had a language background other than English.

In 2023, the school had a student enrollment of 671 with 48 teachers (43.5 full-time equivalent) and 27 non-teaching staff (18.3 full-time equivalent). Female enrollments consisted of 342 students and Male enrollments consisted of 329 students; Indigenous enrollments accounted for a total of 1% and 15% of students had a language background other than English.

== Heritage listing ==
The Brisbane City Council listed the school on the Brisbane Heritage Register as a Local Heritage Place on 1 January 2004, with the citation being created in May 2011. There are no criteria stated as to why the school is listed on the register.

== Notable alumni ==
- Spencer Howson, radio presenter.
- Kyle Sandilands, radio host, shock jock and television personality.

== Notable staff ==
- Herbert Rahmann, cricketer and Inspector of Schools for Queensland.

== See also ==
- List of schools in Greater Brisbane
