= Manly War Memorial =

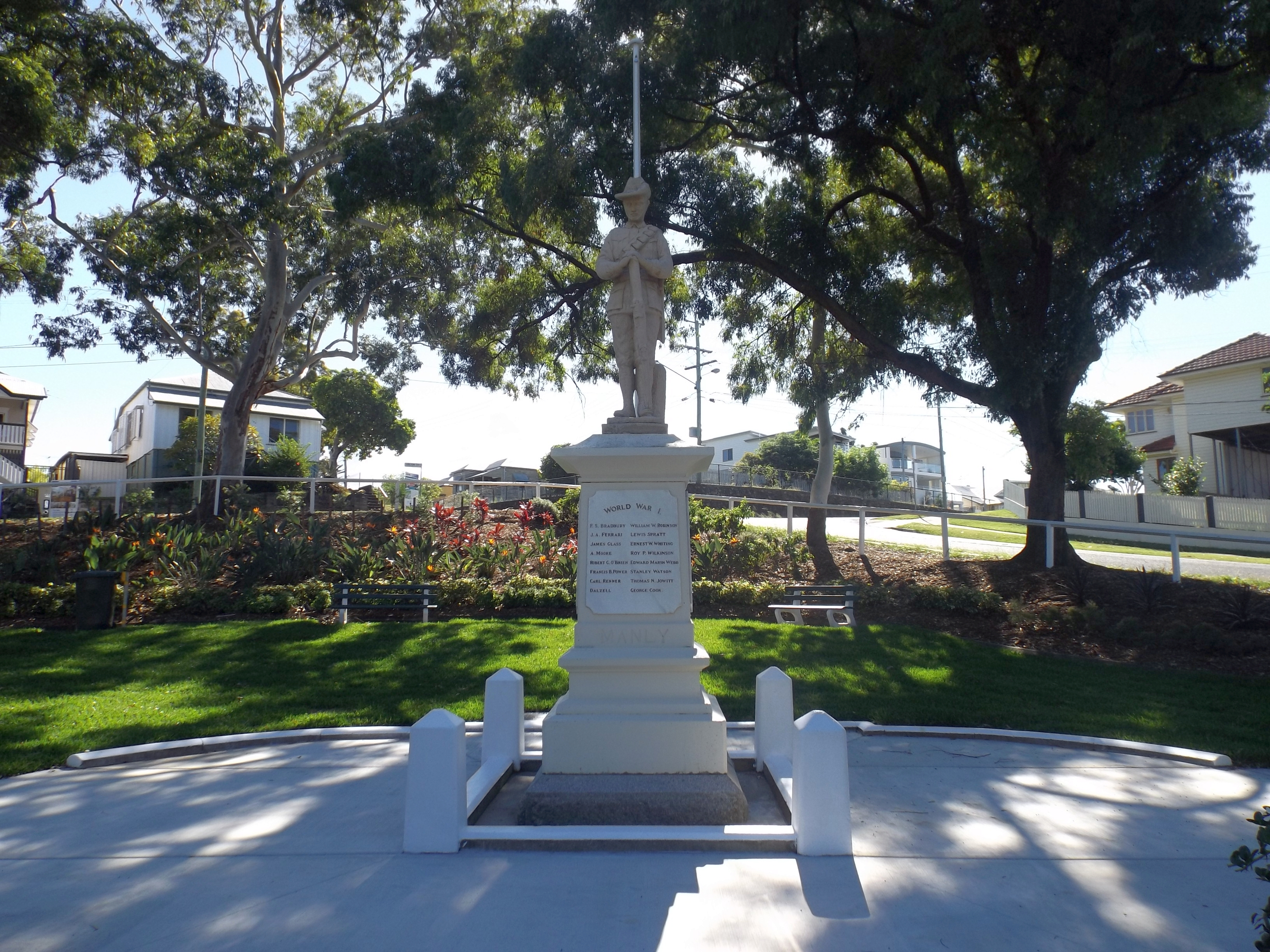
- Memorial in 2015

- Location within Queensland Location within Australia
- 27.4555°S 153.1828°E
- Location: 184 Carlton Terrace, Manly, City of Brisbane, Queensland, Australia

History
- Design period: 1919 – 1930s (interwar period)
- Built: 1920–1921

Queensland Heritage Register
- Official name: Manly War Memorial, Ferguson Street Reserve, Manly Dam, Soldiers Memorial Park
- Type: state heritage (built)
- Designated: 21 August 1992
- Reference no.: 600249
- Significant period: 1920–(social)
- Significant components: trees/plantings, pathway/walkway, garden furniture/seating, flagpole/flagstaff, memorial surrounds/railings, memorial – soldier statue

Manly War Memorial is a heritage-listed memorial at 184 Carlton Terrace, Manly, City of Brisbane, Queensland, Australia. It was built from 1920 to 1921. It is also known as Ferguson Street Reserve, Manly Dam, and Soldiers Memorial Park. It was added to the Queensland Heritage Register on 21 August 1992.

== History ==
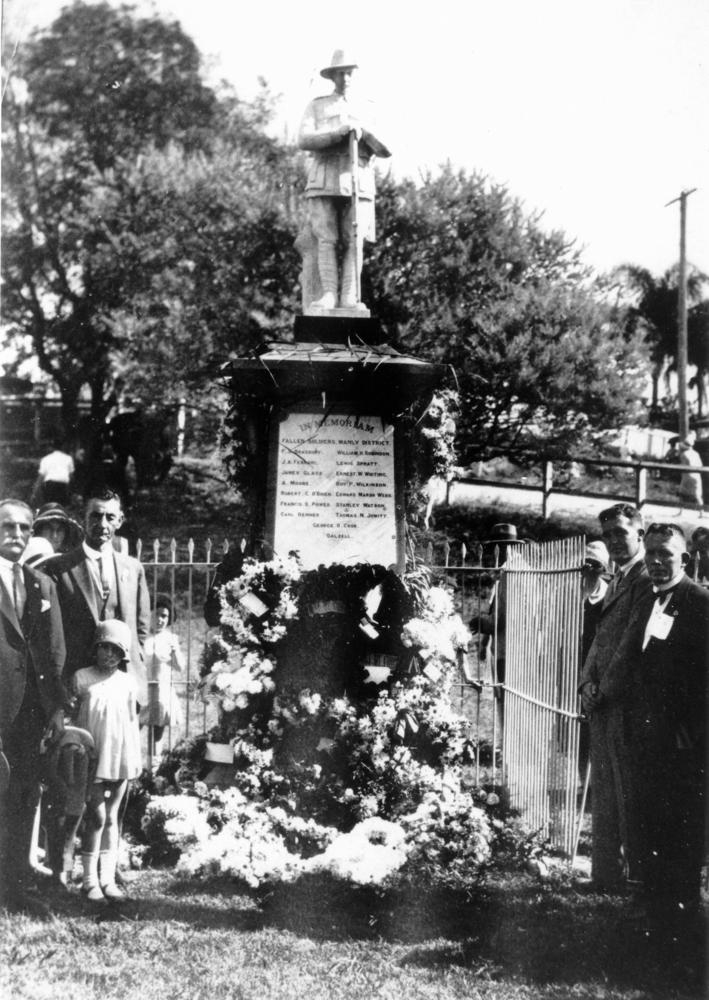
Wreath laying ceremony on Anzac Day at the Manly War Memorial, Brisbane, 1922

The Manly War Memorial was unveiled by Walter Henry Barnes, Member of the Queensland Legislative Assembly, on 5 March 1921. It is not known who designed the memorial, or who the mason was. The memorial, originally of Helidon brown freestone on a base of Enoggera granite, with a statue of Carrara marble, honours the 16 local men who fell during the First World War.

The land on which the park is located was originally part of a 150-acre (61 ha) lot bought by Thomas Jones in 1860. In 1882 the land was sold to the Arnold brothers who sub divided the land for auction. From the late 1890s the area was designated as a water reserve and eventually formed part of the Manly Dam, filled in some time after 1908. The land was never developed and was subsequently divided by a road. The memorial was erected around 1920, however the land, which had always been considered a park, was not officially resumed until 1937.

Previously known as Manly Memorial Park, it was renamed in 1990 after Richard Russell, pioneer Manly citizen and businessman who was elected mayor in 1919.

The Manly digger statue was plagued by acts of vandalism over the years, which culminated in 1992 in the statue being pulled from the pedestal and the head broken off. The statue was replaced with a concrete replica in 2007, but the original Italian marble statue, thought lost, was rediscovered in a Brisbane City Council depot in Lota in 2013.

=== Significance of war memorials in Australia ===
Australia, and Queensland in particular, had few civic monuments before the First World War. The memorials erected in its wake became our first national monuments, recording the devastating impact of the war on a young nation. Australia lost 60,000 from a population of about 4 million, representing one in five of those who served. No previous or subsequent war has made such an impact on the nation.

Even before the end of the war, memorials became a spontaneous and highly visible expression of national grief. To those who erected them, they were as sacred as grave sites, substitute graves for the Australians whose bodies lay in battlefield cemeteries in Europe and the Middle East. British policy decreed that the Empire war dead were to be buried where they fell. The word "cenotaph", commonly applied to war memorials at the time, literally means "empty tomb".

Australian war memorials are distinctive in that they commemorate not only the dead. Australians were proud that their first great national army, unlike other belligerent armies, was composed entirely of volunteers, men worthy of honour whether or not they made the supreme sacrifice. Many memorials honour all who served from a locality, not just the dead, providing valuable evidence of community involvement in the war. Such evidence is not readily obtainable from military records, or from state or national listings, where names are categorised alphabetically or by military unit.

Australian war memorials are also valuable evidence of imperial and national loyalties, at the time, not seen as conflicting; the skills of local stonemasons, metalworkers and architects; and of popular taste. In Queensland, the digger statue was the popular choice of memorial, whereas the obelisk predominated in the southern states, possibly a reflection of Queensland's larger working-class population and a lesser involvement of architects.

Many of the First World War monuments have been updated to record local involvement in later conflicts, and some have fallen victim to unsympathetic re-location and repair.

Although there are many different types of memorials in Queensland, the digger statue is the most common. It was the most popular choice of communities responsible for erecting the memorials, embodying the ANZAC spirit and representing the qualities of the ideal Australian: loyalty, courage, youth, innocence and masculinity. The digger was a phenomenon peculiar to Queensland, perhaps due to the fact that other states had followed Britain's lead and established Advisory Boards made up of architects and artists, prior to the erection of war memorials. The digger statue was not highly regarded by artists and architects who were involved in the design of relatively few Queensland memorials.

Most statues were constructed by local masonry firms, although some were by artists or imported. They varied slightly in design, presumably to suit the needs of the communities who commissioned them.

== Description ==
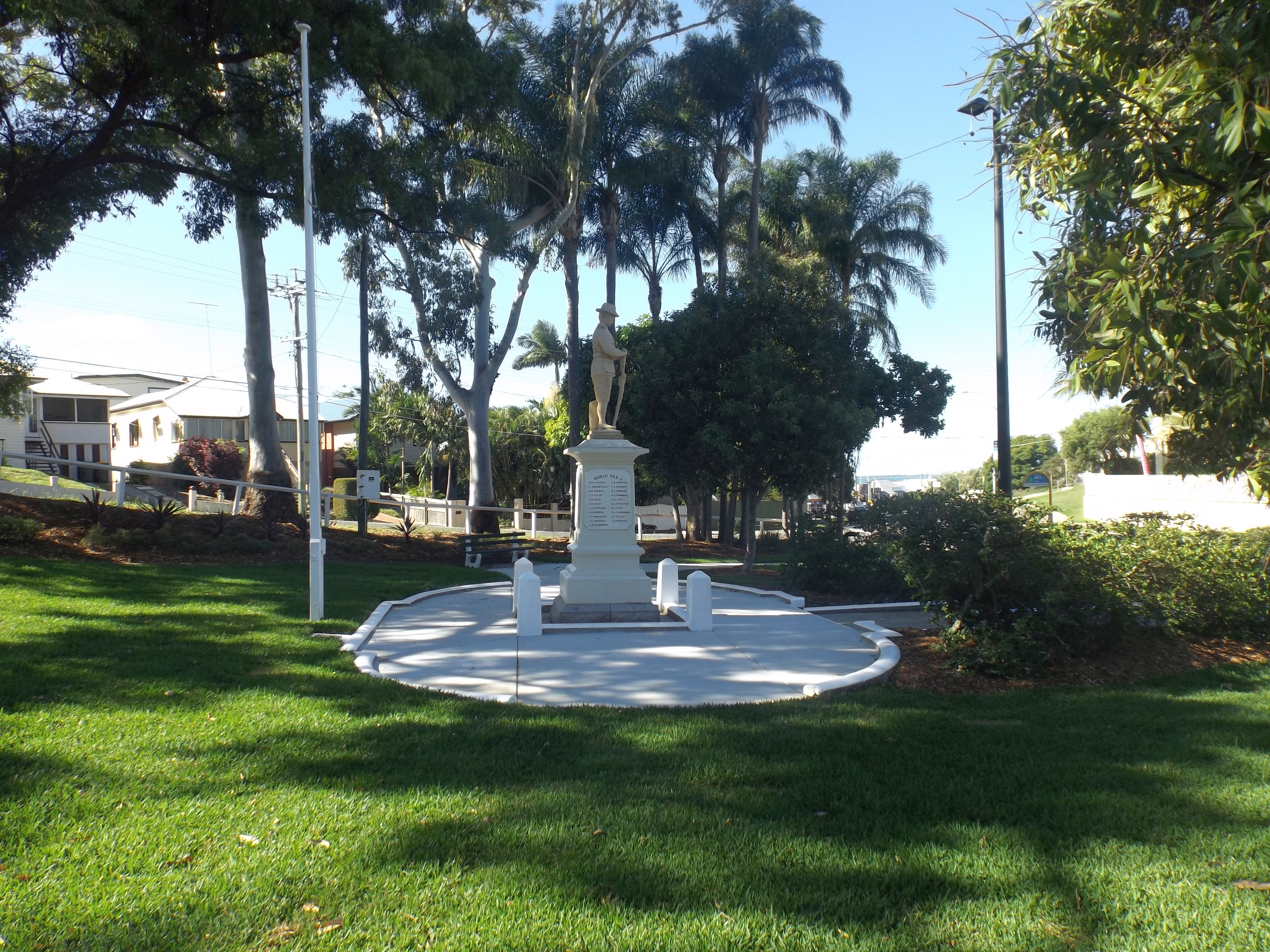
Memorial and park, 2015

The First World War Memorial is situated in a small park at the end of the main shopping street of Manly. It sits in a constructed oval-shaped amphitheatre within the park which comprises a formal arrangement of paths, garden seats, hedges and mature trees.

The memorial is surrounded by kerbing with bollards at each corner which are square in plan with pyramidal apexes. It sits on a circular concrete pad with kerbing to the outside edge.

The pedestal sits on a rock faced granite base with a chamfered top. It is of simple design and constructed of sandstone which has been painted.

The plinth has a smooth faced step surmounted by a simple moulding and another smooth faced step. This is capped by a small cornice. The dado has a small base step and the shaft has slightly tapering sides. The front face displays a marble plaque with the leaded names of the local men who fell in the First World War and the word MANLY is incised on the lower step. The western face also displays a marble plaque with the leaded names of the local men who fell in the Second World War.

The pedestal dado is capped by a simple concave cornice.

== Heritage listing ==
Manly War Memorial was listed on the Queensland Heritage Register on 21 August 1992 having satisfied the following criteria.

The place is important in demonstrating the evolution or pattern of Queensland's history.

War Memorials are important in demonstrating the pattern of Queensland's history as they are representative of a recurrent theme that involved most communities throughout the state. They provide evidence of an era of widespread Australian patriotism and nationalism, particularly during and following the First World War.

The place is important in demonstrating the principal characteristics of a particular class of cultural places.

The monuments manifest a unique documentary record and are demonstrative of popular taste in the inter-war period.

Erected in 1921, the memorial at Manly demonstrates the principal characteristics of a commemorative structure erected as an enduring record of a major historical event. This is achieved through the use of appropriate materials and design elements.

The place is important because of its aesthetic significance.

The memorial and its intact setting are a landmark within Manly and contribute to the aesthetic qualities of the townscape.

The place has a strong or special association with a particular community or cultural group for social, cultural or spiritual reasons.

It has a strong and continuing association with the community as evidence of the impact of a major historic event and as the focal point for the remembrance of that event.
