= Manly, Queensland =

Manly
- Suburb
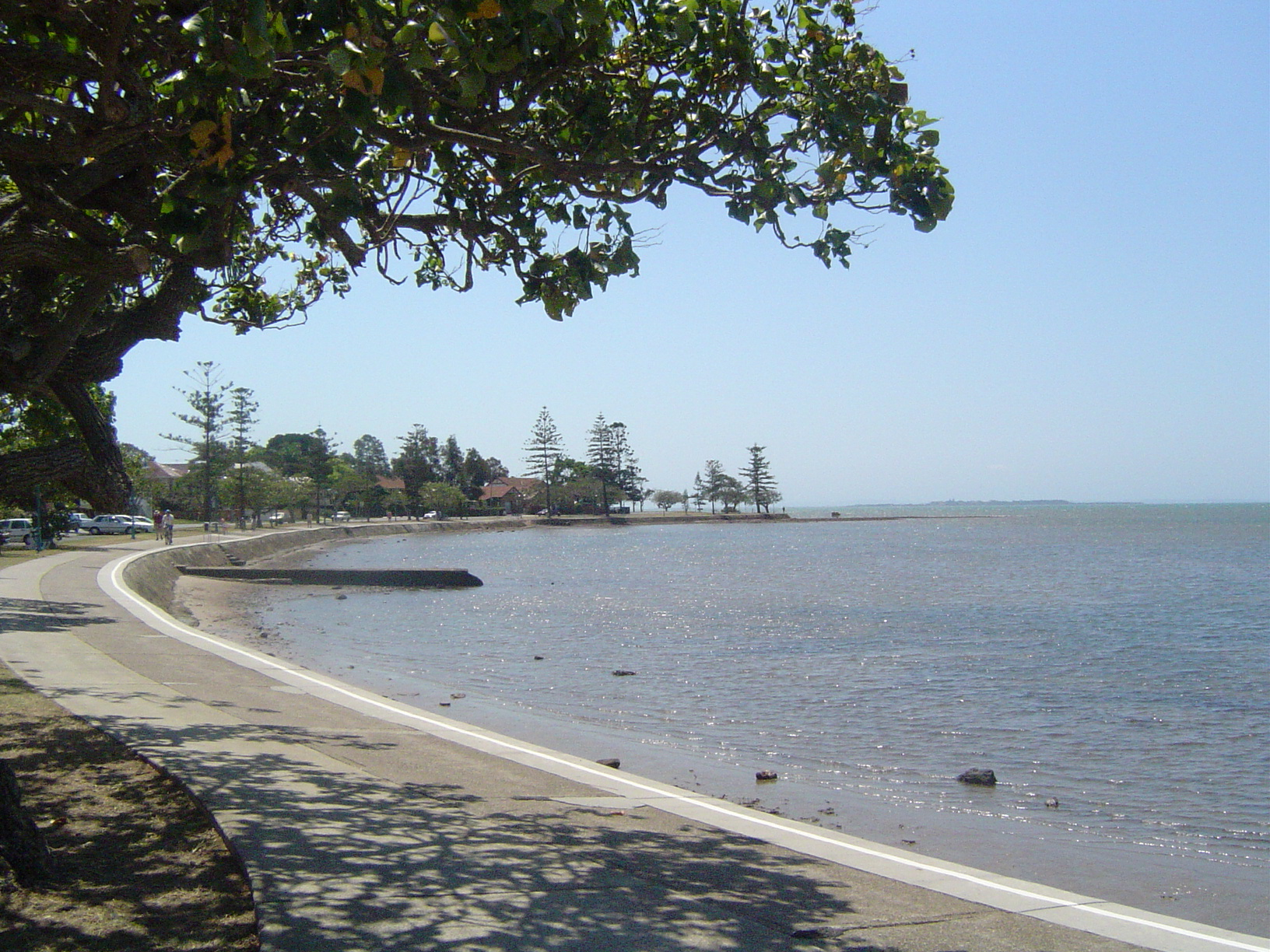
- Calm waters of Moreton Bay in Manly looking northeast to Darling Point

- Interactive map of Manly
- Coordinates: 27.4525°S 153.1872°E
- Country: Australia
- State: Queensland
- City: Brisbane
- LGA: City of Brisbane (Wynnum Manly Ward)
- Location: 19.9 km (12.4 mi) E of Brisbane CBD

Government
  - State electorate: Lytton
  - Federal division: Bonner

Area
  - Total: 2.7 km^{2} (1.0 sq mi)

Population
  - Total: 4,273 (2021 census)
  - Density: 1,583/km^{2} (4,100/sq mi)
- Time zone: UTC+10:00 (AEST)
- Postcode: 4179
Suburbs around Manly
Wynnum	Wynnum	Moreton Bay
Manly West	Manly	Moreton Bay
Manly West	Lota	Moreton Bay

Manly is an eastern bayside suburb in the City of Brisbane, Queensland, Australia. In the 2021 census, Manly had a population of 4,273 people.

== Geography ==
Manly is located 19.9 km (12.4 mi) by road east of the Brisbane GPO. Surrounding suburbs are Wynnum (to the north), Lota (to the south) and Manly West (to the west). To the east lies Moreton Bay (27.4485°S 153.1973°E).

Manly has the following headlands:

- Darling Point (27.4476°S 153.1879°E)
- Norfolk Point (27.4510°S 153.1913°E)

Rose Bay is between Darling Point and Norfolk Point (27.4494°S 153.1883°E). On 9 September 2011, it was named after the historic Rose Bay Estate was a subdivision of land owned by Captain George Poynter Heath in the 1880s. He was Brisbane's first harbour master.

Eastwood Beach is on the shoreline of Rose Bay between the Esplanade and Trafalgar Street (27.4513°S 153.1869°E). On 9 September 2011, it was named after Mr Les Eastwood for creating the beach with the Rotary Club of Wynnum and Manly.

Manly Boat Harbour 41.8-hectare (103-acre) marina to the south of Norfolk Point, in the south-east of the suburb, (27.4536°S 153.1916°E).

Manly train station is on the Cleveland railway line (27.4567°S 153.1802°E). There are two-foot bridges over the line, one at the station (27.4571°S 153.1804°E) and another to the immediate south of the station (27.4562°S 153.1803°E).

== History ==
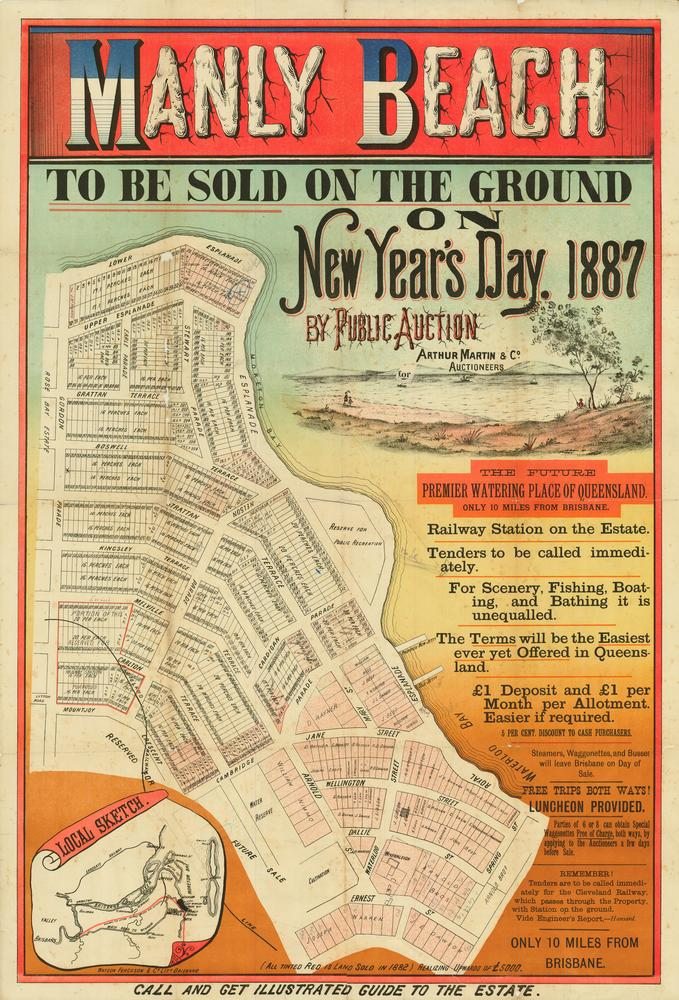
Estate map of Manly Beach, 1887

This part of Moreton Bay was originally occupied by the semi-nomadic Mipirimm subclan of the Quandamooka people. Manly and neighbouring suburb Lota were and continue to be known together as Narlung to the Quandamooka people, likely meaning 'the place of long shadows'.

European settlement of the Manly area first took place from 1859 when the land was surveyed and Thomas Jones obtained a land grant of 200 acres (81 ha). Joseph Lewthwaite built the first house in the area, a stone homestead he called Wyvernleigh at what is now the intersection of Oceana Terrace and Kooralgin Street; it would later also be known as Tingalpa House. What is now Manly was known as Wyvernleigh and managed as part of the Lewthwaite's estate, which included a sugar plantation.

Aboriginal connection to the Manly area continued throughout the colonial period, with town camps recorded in Manly and Wynnum, and local Aboriginal groups running fishing, oyster-catching and turtle-hunting expeditions from the area into the 1920s.

In 1882, the land was sold by auction by James R. Dickson for the Manly Beach Estate, apparently named after Manly, New South Wales beach in Sydney. It comprised 177 allotments of about 20 perches (510 m^{2}) bounded by Arnold Street (the northern part of which is now Cambridge Parade) to the north and north-west, Moreton Bay to the east, Spring Street (now Falcon Street) to the south, and Ernest Street to the south-west. In 1885, James R. Dickson auctioned a further subdivision of 700 lots to the north of the 1882 land sale, bounded to the north-west by Gordon Parade, to the south-west by Mountjoy Crescent, to the south by Cambridge Parade and to east by Moreton Bay. The advertising mentioned the forthcoming railway. However, the 1885 land sale was evidently not successful as 400 blocks in that subdivision were offered in a "continuation sale" in January 1887.

On 1 November 1889 the Cleveland railway line was opened between Albert Station and Cleveland Station. Manly Station was one of the original 13 stations. These stations were Albert (now closed), Logan Road (now Buranda), Coorparoo, Morningside, Mooraree (now Murarrie), Hemmant, Wynnum, Manly, Waterloo (now Thorneside), Birkdale, Wellington (now Wellington Point), Ormiston and Cleveland. For the first two years, the railway line provided a direct service to the Woollongabba, an inner southern suburb of the state capital, Brisbane. With the opening of the Melbourne Street Extension from the South Brisbane Branch Line on 21 December 1891, Cleveland line trains terminated at South Brisbane Railway Station. With the opening of the Merivale Railway Bridge over the Brisbane River in 1978, trains continued from South Brisbane to Roma Street Station and beyond. By the early 1900s the area had become a popular seaside location.

In June 1890, 395 subdivided allotments of the Manly Beach Estate was auctioned by Arthur Martin & Co. This was the third and final section of the estate. A map advertising the auction shows the estate was close to Manly Railway Station and Ernest Street.

In 1904, Anglican church services commenced in a converted cowshed at Wyvernleigh. On 9 March 1912, five parcels of land on Ernest Street were purchased from Harrie Lineker. On 8 August 1914, Archdeacon Henry Le Fanu presided over a stump-capping ceremony for a timber building of 70 by 35 feet (21 by 11 m). Le Fanu returned on 10 November 1914 to open the church and dedicate it to St Paul. On 18 April 1964, Archbishop Philip Strong laid the foundation stone for a new church. On 22 November 1964, the present St Paul's Anglican Church was dedicated by Bishop John Hudson. The 1914 church remains on the site as a hall.

Manly Methodist Church was officially opened at 163 Kingsley Terrace (27.4530°S 153.1841°E) on 1 January 1904. It was extended in the mid 1960s. It became Manly Uniting Church in 1977 when the Methodist Church amalgamated into the Uniting Church in Australia. Its final service was held on 8 July 1990, as the congregation of the Uniting churches had decided to form a combined new church (Bayside Uniting Church). The Kingsley Terrace site was sold and the church is no longer extant.

Manly State School opened on 4 July 1910 or 4 August 1910.

The Manly War Memorial was unveiled in a park at 184 Carlton Street by Walter Henry Barnes, Member of the Queensland Legislative Assembly, on 5 March 1921. The memorial, originally of Helidon brown freestone on a base of Enoggera granite, with a statue of Carrara marble, honours the 16 local men who fell during the First World War.

In June 1925, the homestead Wyvernleigh/Tingalpa House, by then on a site bounded by Oceana Terrace, Kooralgin Street, and Ernest Street, was bought by James Duhig, the Roman Catholic Archbishop of Brisbane to be used for the building of a Roman Catholic church and school. Duhig announced that the church would be named after St John Baptist Vianney. The homestead was used for church services until 1927, after which it was demolished to be replaced by a parish hall. On 20 September 1930 Archbishop Duhig performed the stump capping ceremony on the new church hall; the hall appears to be completed by May 1931. On Easter Sunday 1936, the hall was consecrated as a church. On 22 April 1990, a new brick church was opened, with the old church resuming its role as a hall, until it was replaced with a new hall in 2010–2011.

St Philomina's Catholic School was officially opened on 21 January 1941 by Archbishop James Duhig. The school was operated by the Presentation Sisters and was initially in the grounds of their convent (26 Kooralgin Street), moving across the road to the current site in 1953 where it was renamed St John Vianney Catholic School. It is now full staffed by laity.

The well-sheltered coastal location of Manly has resulted in it becoming a popular location for boating. In 1958 Manly Boat Harbour was built. Large tidal walls were constructed to the north and south with dredging being undertaken to deepen the harbour. The silt that was recovered in this process was brought ashore and used in the construction of the parks and parking areas around the harbour.

Darling Point Opportunity School opened on 24 October 1958. In 1986 it was renamed Darling Point Special School. Its name reflects its location on Darling Point.

Bayside Uniting Church was established in 1990 in Wondall Road, Manly West, combining four Uniting Churches located at:

- Ashton Street, Wynnum, a former Methodist Church
- Kingsley Terrace, Manly, a former Methodist Church
- Preston Road, Manly West, a former Methodist Church
- Yamboyna Street, Manly, a former Congregational Church

Due to earlier or later closures, the Bayside Uniting Church also incorporated congregations from:

- "The Springs" Methodist Church in Manly Road, Manly West
- Lota Methodist Church in Ambool Street, Lota
- Lindum Methodist Church at Sibley Road, Wynnum West
- Hemmant Methodist Church in Hemmant-Tingalpa Road, Hemmant

In 2000, the Queensland Place Names Board named Norfolk Point on reclaimed land in the Manly boat harbour in Moreton Bay after the sloop Norfolk commanded by Matthew Flinders in his exploration of the Moreton Bay. The naming was triggered by a commemorative trip by a replica of the Norfolk. A plaque on the point commemorates the naming.

== Demographics ==
In the 2011 census, Manly had a population of 3,702 people, 50.4% female and 49.6% male. The median age of the Manly population was 42 years of age, 5 years above the Australian median of 37. 73.1% of people living in Manly were born in Australia, compared to the national average of 69.8%; the next most common countries of birth were England 6.7%, New Zealand 5.6%, Scotland 0.8%, United States of America 0.7% and Ireland 0.6%. 90.2% of people spoke only English at home; the next most common languages were 0.5% French, 0.4% Tagalog, 0.3% Dutch, 0.3% Cantonese, 0.3% Thai.

In the 2016 census, Manly had a population of 4,064 people, 50.1% female and 49.9% male. The median age of the Manly population was 44 years of age, 6 years above the Australian median of 38. 72.4% of people living in Manly were born in Australia; the next most common countries of birth were England 7.0%, New Zealand 5.0%, Scotland 0.9%, Ireland 0.8% and the Philippines 0.6%. 88.8% of people spoke only English at home; the next most common languages were 0.6% French, 0.4% Spanish, 0.4% Mandarin, 0.4% Dutch and 0.3% German.

In the 2021 census, Manly had a population of 4,273 people, 49.5% female and 50.5% male. The median age of the Manly population was 46 years of age, 8 years above the Australian median of 38. 72.8% of people living in Manly were born in Australia; the next most common countries of birth were England 8.0%, New Zealand 4.9%, South Africa 0.9%, Scotland 0.8% and Ireland 0.8%. 91.1% of people spoke only English at home; the next most common languages were 0.5% German, 0.5% French, 0.4% Italian, 0.4% Tagalog and 0.4% Spanish.

== Heritage listings ==
Manly has a number of heritage-listed sites, including:

- Cambridge Parade road reserve (27.4551°S 153.1825°E): Stone retaining wall
- 184 Carlton Terrace (27.4555°S 153.1828°E): Manly War Memorial (also known as Soldiers Memorial Park, Manly Dam, Ferguson Street Reserve)
- 89 Ernest Street: Manly State School
- Falcon Street (27.4584°S 153.1867°E): Manly Retaining Wall (also known as The Great Wall of Manly)
- 150 Kingsley Terrace (27.4522°S 153.1845°E): Michael Gannon residence
- 26 Kooralgin Street (27.4573°S 153.1851°E): Sisters of Presentation Convent (also known as Culterfel)
- 184 Melville Terrace (27.4544°S 153.1840°E): Manly-Lota RSL Sub-Branch Hall
- Royal Esplanade (27.4554°S 153.1864°E): Wall & Gardens
- 551 Royal Esplanade (27.4596°S 153.1871°E): Spanish Mission style house

== Education ==
Manly State School is a government primary (Prep–6) school for boys and girls at 63 Ernest Street (27.4580°S 153.1813°E). In 2018, the school had an enrolment of 656 students with 44 teachers (39 full-time equivalent) and 31 non-teaching staff (18 full-time equivalent). It includes a special education program.

St John Vianney's Primary School is a Catholic primary (Prep–6) school for boys and girls at 15 Oceana Terrace (27.4576°S 153.1844°E). In 2018, the school had an enrolment of 436 students with 31 teachers (25 full-time equivalent) and 20 non-teaching staff (11 full-time equivalent).

Darling Point Special School is a primary and secondary (Prep–12) school for boys and girls at 368 Upper Esplanade (27.4478°S 153.1868°E). It provides only special education. In 2018, the school had an enrolment of 123 students with 35 teachers (30 full-time equivalent) and 53 non-teaching staff (32 full-time equivalent).

There is no secondary school in Manly. The nearest government secondary school is Wynnum State High School on the boundary with neighbouring Wynnum to the north-west.

== Boating ==
A number of boating clubs are based in Manly including:

- the Royal Queensland Yacht Squadron (27.4529°S 153.1887°E)
- the Wynnum Manly Yacht Club
- the Moreton Bay Trailer Boat Club
- Darling Point Sailing Squadron, the Multi-Hull Club of Australia, and the charity for disability people known as Sailability, which share facilities

Royal Queensland Yacht Squadron, Wynnum Manly Yacht Club and Moreton Bay Trailer Boat club have floating marinas, dry boat storage facilities and boat maintenance yards for use by members. There is one commercial marina in the harbour, East Coast Marina, also offering floating berths, undercover boat storage and a boat maintenance yard.

There is breakwater on the south side of the Manly Boat Harbour (27.4519°S 153.1925°E). There is a boat ramp, floating walkway and pontoon at the north end of Manly Boat Harbour near Fairlead Crescent (27.4526°S 153.1890°E). There is another a boat ramp, floating walkway and pontoon at south end of Manly Boat Harbour (27.4602°S 153.1896°E). These are all managed by the Department of Transport and Main Roads.

The Sporting Pontoon is off Trafalgar Street (27.4519°S 153.1903°E). It is managed by the Darling Point Sailing Club.

Brisbane Coast Guard (a flotilla of the Australian Volunteer Coast Guard) also has its base in Manly Boat Harbour, at 40 Trafalgar Street, near the harbour entrance (27.4521°S 153.1897°E). This flotilla, the largest in Australia, has the Lord Mayor of Brisbane as its patron, a tradition which began with mayor Campbell Newman during the 2011 Brisbane floods. It was formed in 1972.

== Amenities ==
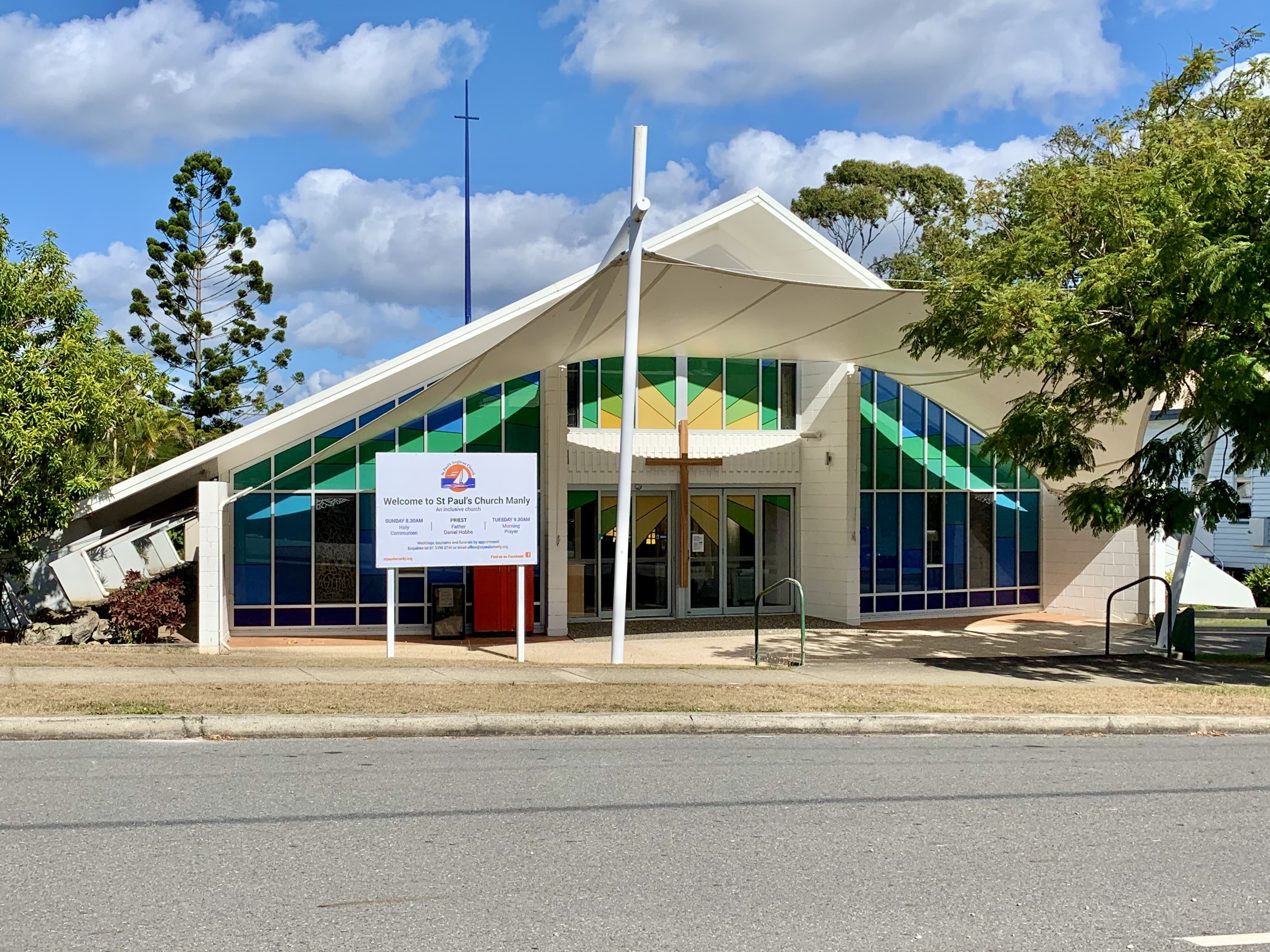
St Paul's Anglican Church, 2020

Retail facilities in Manly include:

- Manly Harbour Village, 50 Cambridge Street (27.4546°S 153.1858°E)
- Manly Post Office, on the Stratton Terrace side of Manly Harbour Village (27.4544°S 153.1860°E)

Churches in Manly include:

- St Pauls Anglican Church, 99 Ernest Street (27.4583°S 153.1828°E)
- St John Vianney Catholic Church, eastern corner of Ernest Street and Kooralgin Street, (27.4581°S 153.1838°E)

== Attractions ==
Wynnum Manly Tourism & Visitor Information Centre is a tourist information centre (27.4541°S 153.1851°E).

== Transport ==
Manly railway station provides access to regular Queensland Rail City network services to Brisbane and Cleveland.

A number of local bus services operate between Manly and surrounding suburbs, with connections to Brisbane City services in Wynnum.
