= Wynnum =

- Suburb
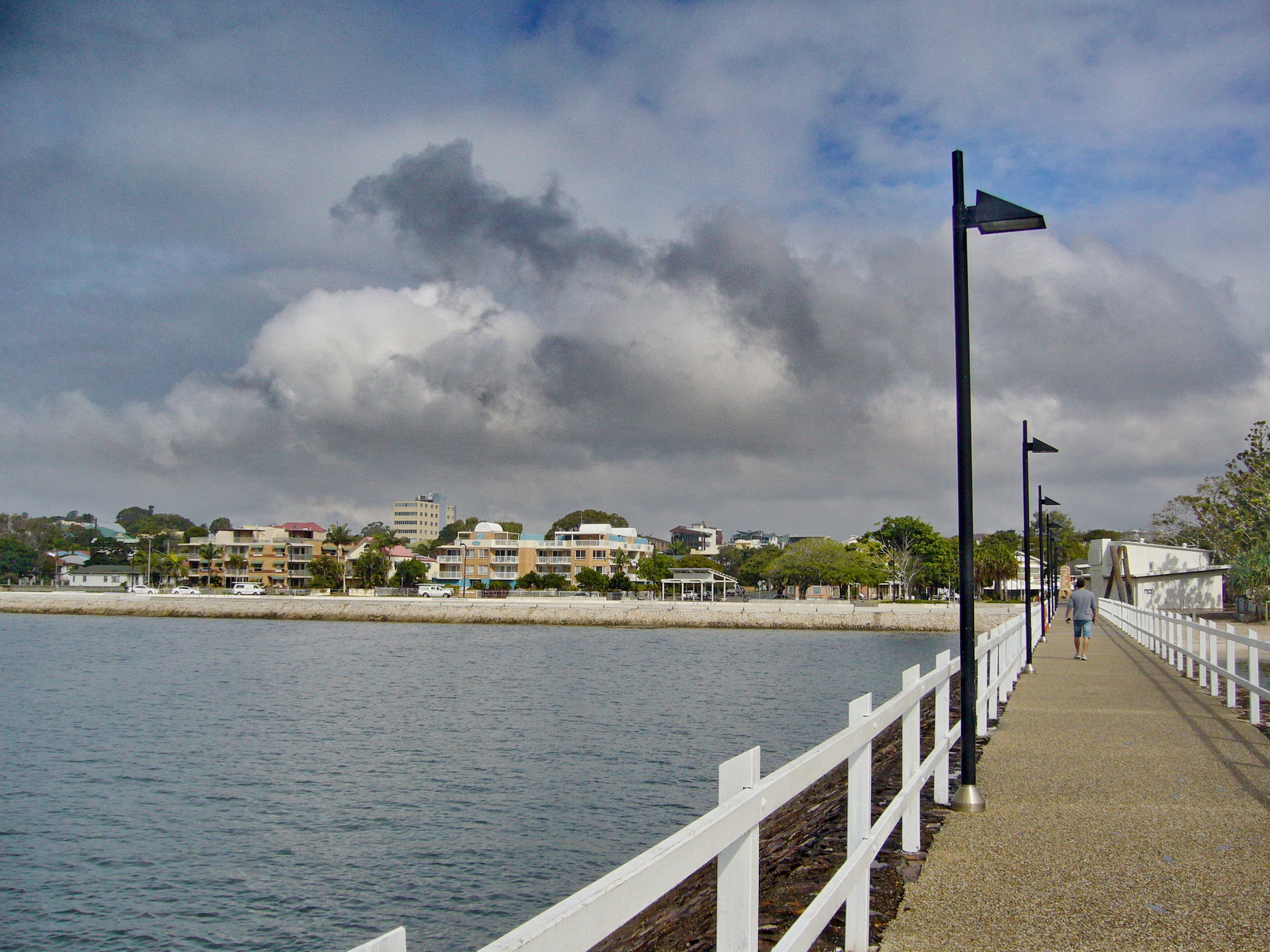
- Wynnum foreshore from Wynnum jetty

- Interactive map of Wynnum
- Coordinates: 27.4358°S 153.1691°E
- Country: Australia
- State: Queensland
- City: Brisbane
- LGA: City of Brisbane (Wynnum Manly Ward)
- Location: 19.6 km (12.2 mi) E of Brisbane CBD

Government
  - State electorate: Lytton
  - Federal division: Bonner

Area
  - Total: 7.9 km^{2} (3.1 sq mi)

Population
  - Total: 14,036 (2021 census)
  - Density: 1,777/km^{2} (4,602/sq mi)
- Time zone: UTC+10:00 (AEST)
- Postcode: 4178
Suburbs around Wynnum
Lytton	Port of Brisbane	Moreton Bay
Wynnum West	Wynnum	Moreton Bay
Wynnum West	Manly West	Manly

Wynnum is a coastal suburb in the City of Brisbane, Queensland, Australia. The suburb is a popular destination in Brisbane due to its coastline, jetty and tidal wading pool. In the 2021 census, Wynnum had a population of 14,036 people. Wynnum and the adjoining suburb Manly were once known as twin towns.

== Geography ==
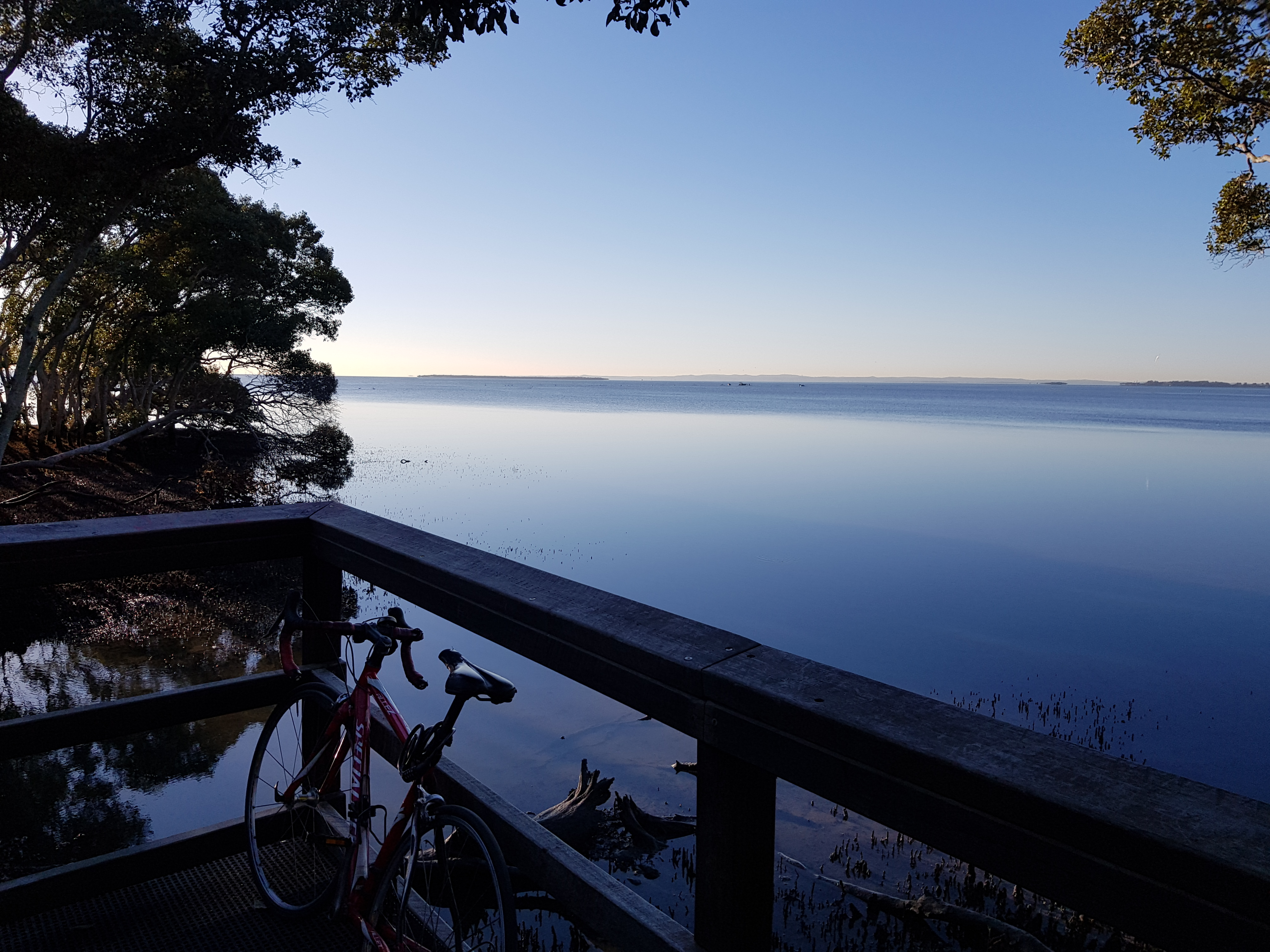
Moreton Bay, North Stradbroke Island and mangroves from Wynnum

Wynnum is on the shores of Moreton Bay in Brisbane, Australia, about 19.6 kilometres (12.2 mi) by road east of the Brisbane GPO.

== Toponymy ==
The name Wynnum is believed to be the corruption of winnam, which is the Kabi language word for the pandanus palm (aka 'breadfruit'), although the suburb is not located in a former Kabi speaking area.

== History ==
Aboriginal history of Quandamooka (Moreton Bay) stretches back over 25,000 years and Aboriginal connection to the Wynnum area (Originally Winnam) has remained strong throughout European colonisation. Thomas Petrie, a visitor in the 1840s, described Wynnum as a large Aboriginal camp (centred on what is now Elanora Park 27.433°S 153.172°E, referred to as Black's Camp as late as the 1980s) for launching expeditions to hunt turtle, dugong and flying fox on the neighbouring islands. European settlement first appeared at North Wynnum (around the mouth of Wynnum Creek) at the fringe of Black's Camp.

Aboriginal men from Black's Camp helped build the original Wynnum jetty in the 1850s, and in 1886, three local Aboriginal men, 'Johnny Murray, Tommy Nuggin and Sam', saved three European women from drowning in Wynnum Creek. Local Aboriginal people also ran fishing, oyster-catching and turtle hunting enterprises from Wynnum into the early 1900s, with these tours advertised in Brisbane's newspapers. There were some tensions with the European newcomers, including an unprovoked attack by local ruffians on the Aboriginal camp in Wynnum in 1884. Well known Jagera chief 'King Sandy' Kerwalli (aka Gairballie) died at Black's Camp in 1900.

The area remained sparsely settled by Europeans until the arrival of the railway in the late 1880s, but then grew fairly rapidly. On Saturday 22 November 1890, 95 subdivided allotments of Wynnum Station Estate were auctioned by R. J. Cottell. A map advertising the auction show them to be near Bridge Street and close to Wynnum Railway Station.

On 20 August 1890, a Wesleyan Methodist church was opened in Wilde Street, the first church built at Wynnum. It was 30 by 20 feet (9.1 by 6.1 m) and built by John Iley Green of Thompson Estate. Having become too small for the congregation, another church was built at 24 Ashton Street (27.4395°S 153.1695°E), which was officially opened on Wednesday 2 April 1902 with the first service being conducted on Sunday 6 April 1902. It was also built by John Iley Green in the Carpenter Gothic style. A Sunday School hall was added in February 1929. In early 1958 the church was closed while it was extended by a further 25 feet (7.6 m) with services being held temporarily in the hall. The church officially re-opened on Sunday 11 April 1958. In June 1977 it became part of the Uniting Church of Australia. Following the amalgamation of a number of local congregations to form the Bayside Uniting Church, the church was closed with a final service on 8 July 1990. It was sold in November 1990 into private ownership for $112,000 and was converted into a residence. On 1 January 2004 the 1902 church building was listed on the Brisbane Heritage Register.

In October 1892 the adherents of the Church of England in Wynnum decided to buy half an acre of land in Charlotte Street (now 77 Charlotte Street, 27.4435°S 153.1718°E) for £50 to erect a church. After some years of fund raising, on Saturday 8 October 1896 the foundation stone was laid in the presence of the Bishop of Brisbane William Webber and the Premier of Queensland James Dickson. St Peter's Anglican Church was officially opened and dedicated on Thursday 9 March 1899.

Wynnum State School opened on 24 February 1896. In 1910 it was renamed Wynnum Central State School. It was at 105 Florence Street (27.4442°S 153.1724°E). It closed on 31 December 2010 as it was amalgamated with Lindum State School and Wynnum North State School in Prospect Street to create a new Wynnum State School on the site for the former Wynnum North State High School (which relocated to Wynnum West, reopening as Brisbane Bayside State College). Wynnum Central State School's website was archived.

The former Wynnum Shire Council was created in 1902, and twelve years later Wynnum became a municipality with its own town council and the right to elect a mayor. Black's Camp was disbanded in 1908, and the area was redeveloped into Elanora Park in the 1930s. The Wynnum Town Council was absorbed into the enlarged City of Brisbane in 1925.

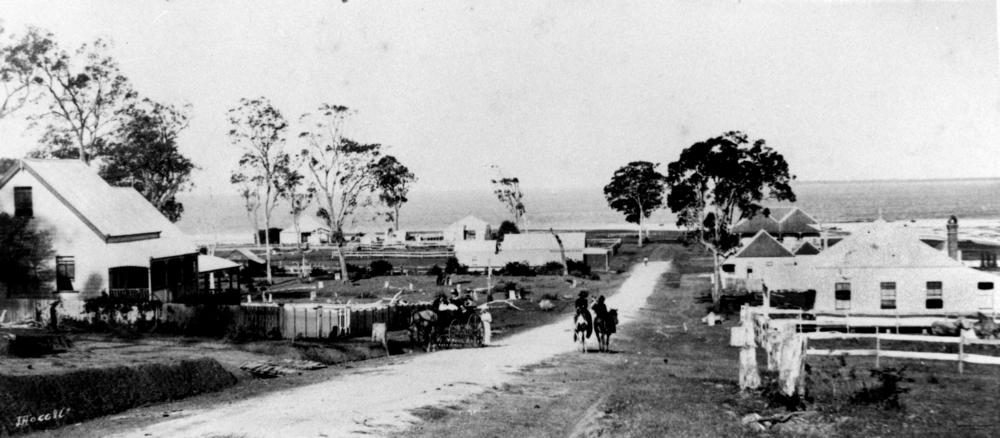
Street in Wynnum, c. 1889.

Wynnum North State School was established in 1911. The school originally opened in 1882 as Lytton State School but in 1911 the buildings were relocated from Lytton to Wynnum North on the corner of Tingal Road and Prospect Street (27.4339°S 153.1656°E) and the school renamed Wynnum North State School in 1911. It closed on 31 December 2010 as it was amalgamated with Lindum State School and Wynnum Central State School to create a new Wynnum State School. Wynnum North State School's website was archived.

In 1912, a Baptist church opened in Wynnum. Prior to the opening of the church, Baptist services were held in the Wynnum Shire Hall. Having purchased 3 allotments in Edith Street, a stump-capping ceremony was held on Sunday 13 October 1912. The dedication ceremony for the completed church was held on Saturday 21 December 1912. As the congregation grew, the need to enlarge the church resulted in a decision in 1930 to relocate the church building to 168 Bay Terrace on land donated by couple Edward Robert and Catherine Harriet Humphreys (members of the congregation). The building is still extant and listed on the Brisbane Heritage Register, but no longer in use as a church.

Guardian Angels Catholic Primary School was officially opened by Archbishop James Duhig on Sunday 4 October 1914. It was operated by the Sisters of Mercy. The first principal was Sister Mary Winifred who commenced lessons on Monday 5 October 1914. By the end of 1914, the school had an enrolment of 73 students. In 2004, the school expanded to a second campus, formerly occupied by Mount Carmel Catholic Secondary School (which relocated to Thornlands).

In November 1914, the Wynnum Sports Ground Estate was advertised as being available for sale on the ground by Cameron Bros. In July 1921, Wavell's Vineyard Estate was advertised as being available for sale by public auction on the ground by Isles, Love & Co.

A congregation of the Church of Christ began meeting in the home of Mr and Mrs A. Hinrichsen in Bride Street, who then donated land in Mary Street (now 55 Berrima Street, 27.4410°S 153.1719°E) for a chapel. On Saturday 12 December 1925, the congregation built most of the chapel in a day with the assistance of members of other congregations (about 60 men were involved). The opening service was held on Sunday 20 December 1925. In March 1930, a hall was built adjoining the chapel, doubling the floor area. The interior of the chapel was refurbished in 1972. Due to declining attendances and rising costs, the chapel held its final service on Sunday 29 September 2013.

St John's Anglican Church was dedicated circa 1929. It was at 54 Randall Road (approx 27.4551°S 153.1584°E). It closed circa 1995.

On 9 January 1932, a stump-capping ceremony was held for a new Presbyterian Church in Tingal Road. The 1918 church was demolished so it might be remodelled as the new church.

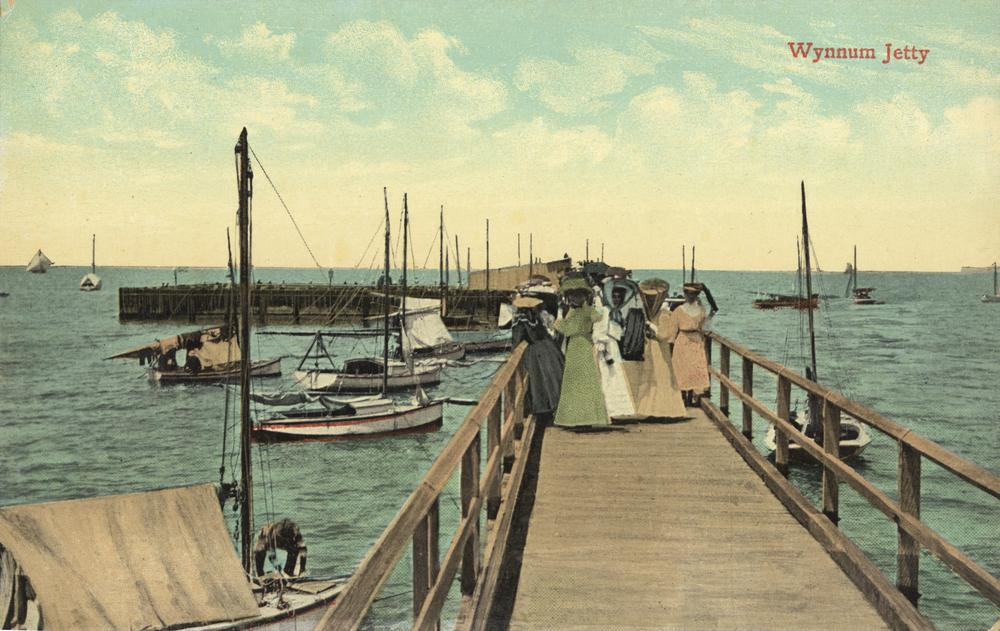
Wynnum jetty in 1907

The Wynnum Seventh-day Adventist Church was established in late 1937 with the first minister being Pastor Septimus Wilfred Carr. Initially they met in private homes and then held at Wynnum RSL Hall and then at the Wynnum St Peters Church of England Hall. In 1947, a block of land was purchased at the corner of Sunflower and Carnation Street, Wynnum and in 1948 the Mitchelton Methodist Hall was purchased and moved to the site as the congregations' first church.

On 21 August 1941, the Minister for Works and Education, Harry Bruce, laid the foundation stone for Wynnum State High School. The school was to occupy part of Russell Park (now Memorial Park) which had belonged to the Brisbane City Council. In return for giving up part of the park, the Queensland Government gave the council the land which is Primose Park today. Wynnum State High School was completed in time to open in February 1942, but, due to fears of a Japanese invasion, the Queensland Government delayed the re-opening of schools that year. The school finally opened on 2 March 1942, but it was not until Saturday 3 July 1943 that the school was officially opened by the Minister for Education, Arthur Jones.

In 1956, Anglicans in Wynnum constructed a Sunday school at Primrose Parade (Sibley Road end, approx 27.4409°S 153.1552°E). In 1964 they constructed a church hall, which was dedicated on 3 May 1964 by Coadjutor Bishop John Hudson as St Margaret's Anglican Church Hall. In 1984 the new St Peter's Anglican Church opened at 77 Charlotte Street and this led to the closure of St Margaret's Church Hall on 11 August 1985, after which St Margaret's was relocated to Murarrie to become St Clare's Anglican Church and the Primrose Parade site was sold for residential development.

Mount Carmel Catholic Secondary School College opened in 1957. It closed on 31 December 1992, when it relocated to Thornlands, re-opening as Carmel College.

St Oswald's Anglican Church in Wynnum North was dedicated circa 1957. It was in Prospect Street. In 1967, this church established the first Meals on Wheels service in Wynnum. The church closed circa 1981.

Wynnum North State High School opened on 28 January 1964. It was at 2287 Wynnum Road (27.4407°S 153.1614°E). It relocated at the start of 2010, reopening as Brisbane Bayside State College in Wynnum West. Its original site on Wynnum Road was then redeveloped for the new Wynnum State School.

In 1987, Pandanus Beach was constructed by bringing sand from North Stradbroke Island and building rock groynes to try to prevent the sand from being eroded by the action of the waves in the bay. On 26 September 1987 Pandanus Beach was officially opened by Tom Burns, the Member of the Queensland Legislative Assembly for Lytton and resident of Wynnum.

Bayside Uniting Church was established in 1990 in Wondall Road, Manly West, combining four Uniting Churches located at:

- 24 Ashton Street, Wynnum, a former Methodist Church
- Kingsley Terrace, Manly, a former Methodist Church
- Preston Road, Manly West, a former Methodist Church
- Yamboyna Street, Manly, a former Congregational Church

Due to earlier or later closures, the Bayside Uniting Church also incorporated congregations from:

- "The Springs" Methodist Church in Manly Road, Manly West
- Lota Methodist Church in Ambool Street, Lota
- Lindum Methodist Church at Sibley Road, Wynnum West, opened 1963, last service on 7 September 2013, demolished 2016 to build an aged care facility
- Hemmant Methodist Church in Hemmant-Tingalpa Road, Hemmant

== Demographics ==
Census date	Population
Wynnum
1891	0683
1911	2320
1921	8357
1933	12,905
1954	18,479
Wynnum and Lota
1961	22,007
1971	24,064

In the 2011 census, Wynnum had a population of 12,229 people, 51.1% female and 48.9% male. The median age of the Wynnum population was 40 years, 3 years above the Australian median. 73.7% of people living in Wynnum were born in Australia, compared to the national average of 69.8%; the next most common countries of birth were New Zealand 6.2%, England 5.3%, Philippines 0.9%, Scotland 0.8%, South Africa 0.5%. 88.9% of people spoke only English at home; the next most common languages were 0.5% Tagalog, 0.4% German, 0.4% Vietnamese, 0.3% Filipino, 0.3% Spanish.

In the 2016 census, Wynnum had a population of 12,915 people.

In the 2021 census, Wynnum had a population of 14,036 people.

== Heritage listings ==
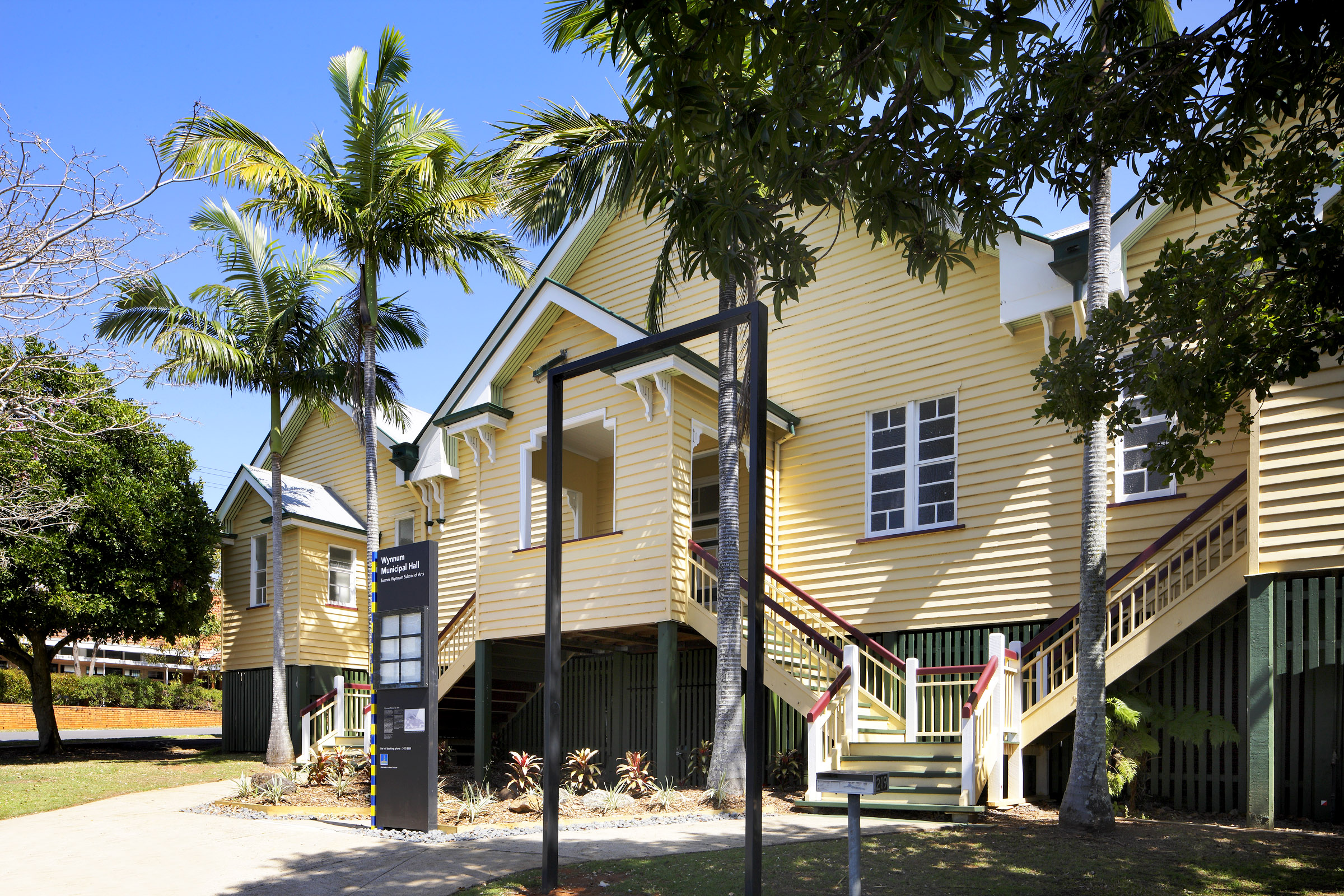
Wynnum Hall

Wynnum has a number of heritage-listed sites on the Queensland Heritage Register and Brisbane Heritage Register, including:

- Wilnecote, 84 Alkoomie Street
- Christadelphian Ecclesia of Wynnum Central, 82 Andrew Street
- former Wynnum Methodist Church, 24 Ashton Street
- former Wynnum Post Office, 155 Bay Terrace
- Wynnum Baptist Church, 168 Bay Terrace
- Guardian Angels Catholic Church, 198 Bay Terrace
- Mount Carmel Convent, 199 Bay Terrace
- Wynnum Community Centre (former Wynnum School of Arts), 219 Bay Terrace
- former Wynnum Presbyterian Church, 238 Bay Terrace
- Cranleigh Lodge, 249 Bay Terrace
- Church of Christ, 55 Berrima Street
- Waterloo Bay Hotel, 75 Berrima Street
- Kitchener Park, 20 Bridge Street:
- Wynnum Memorial Park, 105 Buderim Street
- Anzac Cottage No. 48 (also known as Hart), 128 Dibar Street
- Wynnum Central State School (also known as Wynnum State School), 105 Florence Street
- Fox Street Bridge, Fox Street (27.4377°S 153.1731°E)
- 67 Glenora Street, Wynnum, 67 Glenora Street
- Tower House, 17 Kingsley Terrace
- former Wynnum Fire Station, 39 Mountjoy Terrace
- Tingalpa (also known as Stratford Villa), 56 Mountjoy Terrace
- Wynnum State High School Block A, corner of Peel Street and Buderim Street (27.4543°S 153.1763°E)
- Moreton House, 101 Petersen Street
- Wynnum Golf Course, 38 Stradbroke Avenue
- Adventist Church, 25 Sunflower Street
- Kitchener Memorial, Tingal Road (27.4432°S 153.1689°E)
- Wynnum Masonic Hall, 3 Tingal Road
- former Wynnum Ambulance Station, 33 Tingal Road
- Shire Clerk's Cottage, 229 Tingal Road
- Pamphlett Memorial, 245 Tingal Road (27.44126°S 153.16873°E)
- Wynnum North State School, 400 Tingal Road
- Bus Shelter, 416 Tingal Road (27.4332°S 153.1657°E)
- Anzac Cottage No. 34, 45 Wassell Street
- Interwar-era house, 66 Wassell Street
- Britannia, 75 Waterloo Esplanade
- Wynnum Wading Pool (also known as Manly Wading Pool), Wynnum Esplanade (27.4425°S 153.1771°E)
- Cooroona, 2311 Wynnum Road
- Woodlands, 2333 Wynnum Road
- Brierley, 271 Wynnum North Road
- Nazareth House, 272 Wynnum North Road

== Education ==
Wynnum State School is a government primary (Early Childhood to Year 6) school for boys and girls at 81 Boxgrove Avenue (27.4416°S 153.1602°E). In 2018, the school had an enrolment of 754 students with 57 teachers (51 full-time equivalent) and 36 non-teaching staff (22 full-time equivalent). It includes a special education program.

Guardian Angels' Primary School is a Catholic primary (Prep–6) school for boys and girls at 188 Bay Terrace (27.4458°S 153.1758°E). In 2018, the school had an enrolment of 546 students with 40 teachers (34 full-time equivalent) and 25 non-teaching staff (15 full-time equivalent).

Wynnum State High School is a government secondary (7–12) school for boys and girls at Peel Street (27.4549°S 153.1766°E). In 2018, the school had an enrolment of 875 students with 78 teachers (75 full-time equivalent) and 30 non-teaching staff (24 full-time equivalent). It includes a special education program.

Moreton Bay Environmental Education Centre is a special purpose school facility at 162 Stradbroke Avenue (27.4411°S 153.1635°E). The centre provides environmental and cultural experiences for school students both on-site and at 10 other significant locations in the bayside area.

== Amenities ==
The Brisbane City Council operates a public library located at 145 Florence Street. The library opened in 1946 with a major refurbishment in 2016 and offers publicly accessible Wi-Fi.

The Bay Belles branch of the Queensland Country Women's Association meets at the Wynnum RSL at 174 Tingal Road (27.4438°S 153.1694°E).

The Bayside Parklands provide public access to 16 kilometres (9.9 mi) of shoreline including mangroves, mudflats and wetlands. Many migratory shorebirds can be seen from the parklands as Moreton Bay is a Ramsar site. Next to the Wynnum Wading Pool which has a playground and water park and the Wynnum Jetty, there is a man-made beach called Pandanus Beach.

== Sports and recreational activities ==
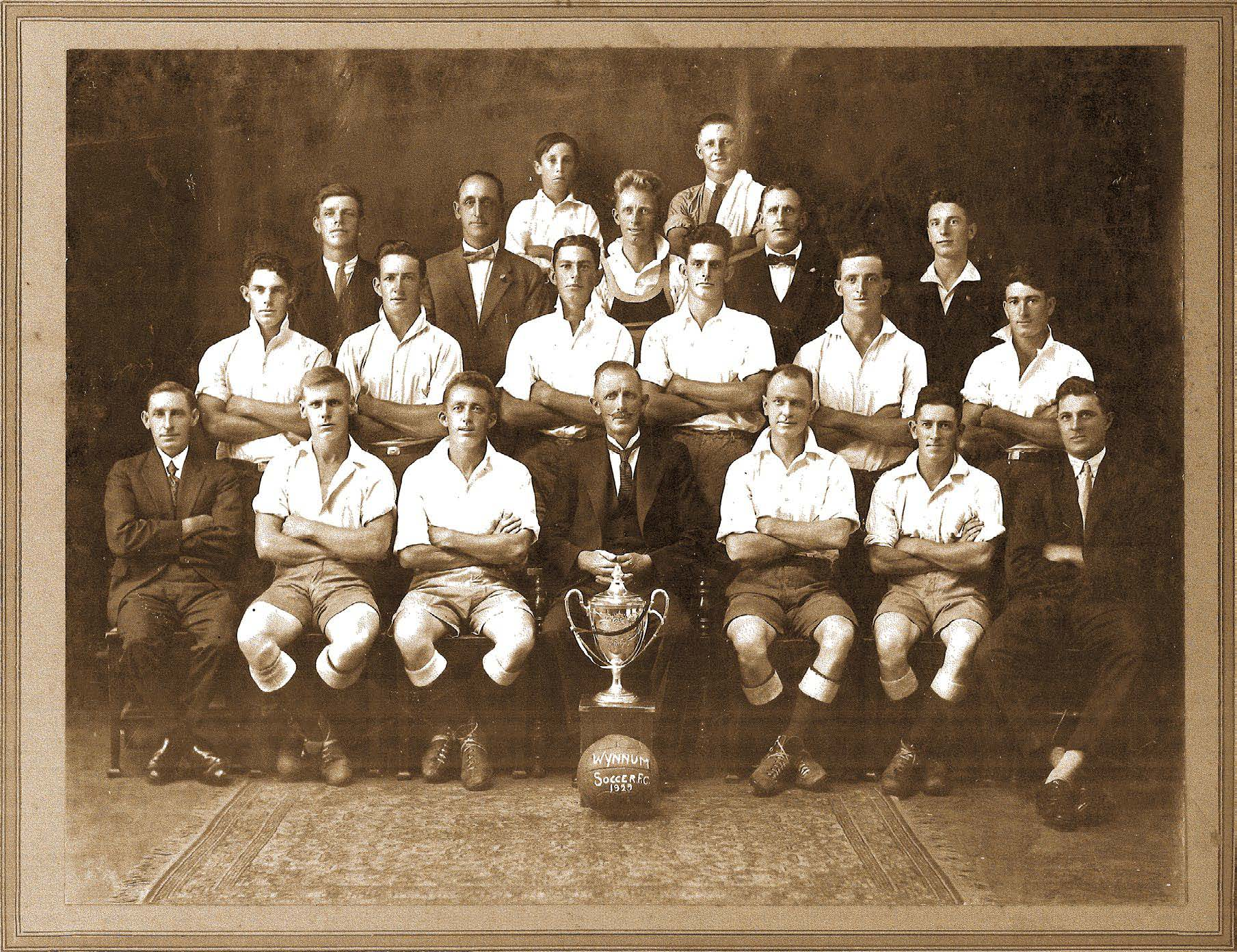
Wynnum Soccer Football Club 1929

Wynnum has a number of long-established sporting clubs, such as Wynnum Seagulls Rugby League Club, Wynnum Golf Club, Wynnum District SC (Wolves FC Soccer Club - since 1921), Wynnum Manly District Cricket Club, Wynnum Bugs Rugby Union Club, Bayside United Soccer Club and Wynnum Vikings Australian Rules Football Club.

The Queensland Women's Cricket Association was founded in the 1920s, but only began formally in 1929 with the Wynnum Women's Cricket team. In this team Edna Newfong and Mabel Crouch were chosen as players, the first Aboriginal women to represent Australia in any sport. It was a major achievement in the 1930s as Aboriginal women had to face both racist and sexist disadvantages, all the while being under the control of the Aboriginals Protection and Restriction of the Sale of Opium Act 1897, which legally restricted civil rights to Aboriginal people.

Wynnum Esplanade hosts Wynnum parkrun every Saturday – a free weekly 5 kilometres (3.1 mi) walk/run which attracts many participants. Recreational clubs include the Wynnum Manly Leagues Club and the RSL. The Wynnum foreshore is a popular swimming and picnic spot for Brisbane families especially at weekends.

== Transport ==
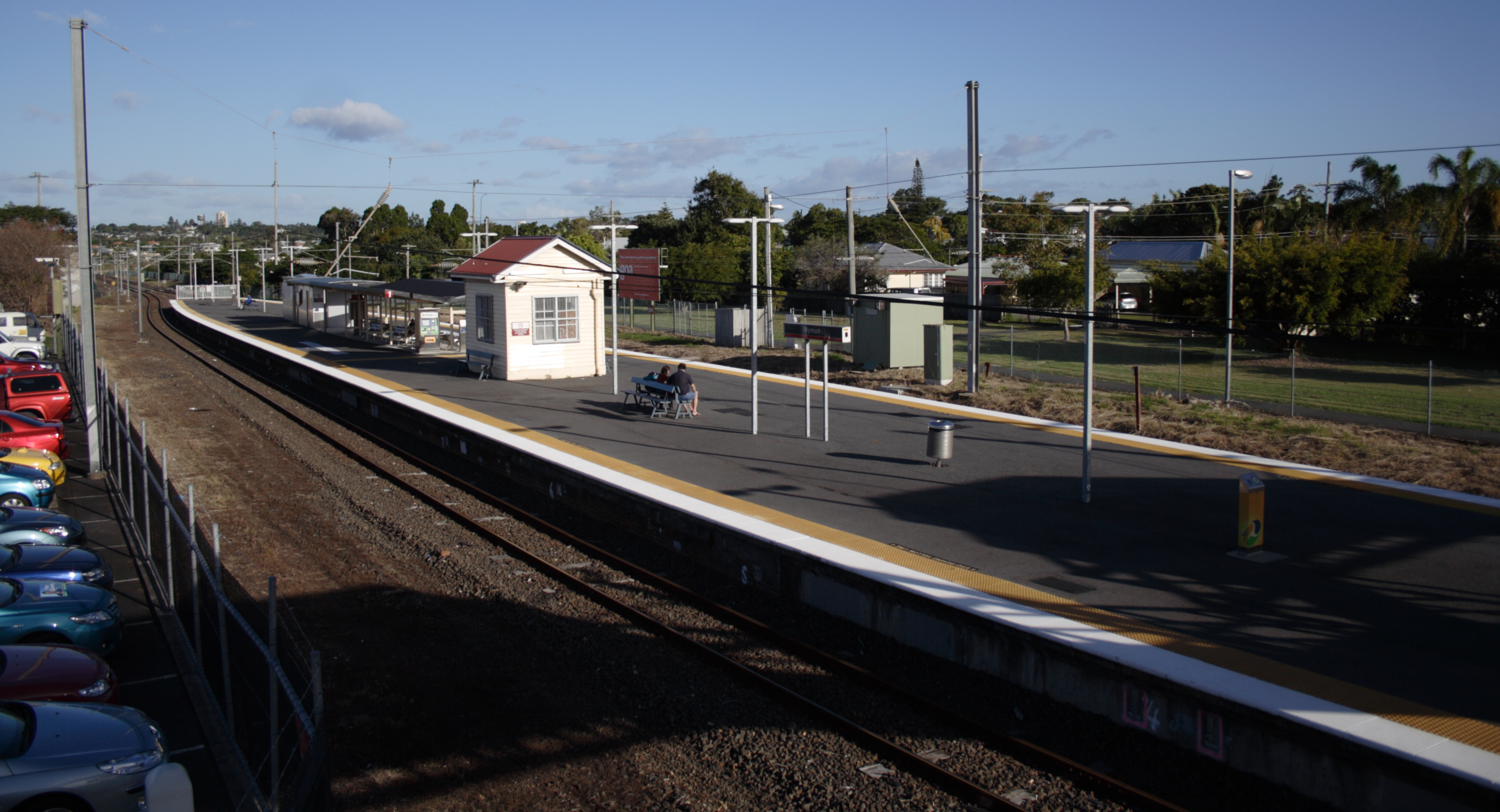
Wynnum railway station

Wynnum is served by three stations on the Cleveland railway line. Wynnum North railway station, Wynnum railway station and Wynnum Central railway station provide access to regular Queensland Rail City network services to Brisbane and Cleveland.

== Notable residents ==
The following were either born or have lived at some time in Wynnum:

- Joe Andon – CEO of Vuly Play
- Warner Batchelor – boxer
- Paul Bishop – actor and politician
- Quentin Bryce – former Governor General of Australia
- Matthew Cameron – paralympian
- Kay Danes – human rights activist, memoirist
- Paul Green – rugby league player and coach
- Dorothy Hewett – author
- Bradley Mark – paralympic shooter
- Hamar Midgley – zoologist
- John Newfong – journalist and writer
- Wayne Perske – golfer
- Arthur Postle – athlete
- 'King Sandy' / Kerwalli – Elder of the Jagera People
- Kyle Sandilands – radio host
- Hugh Scott – architect
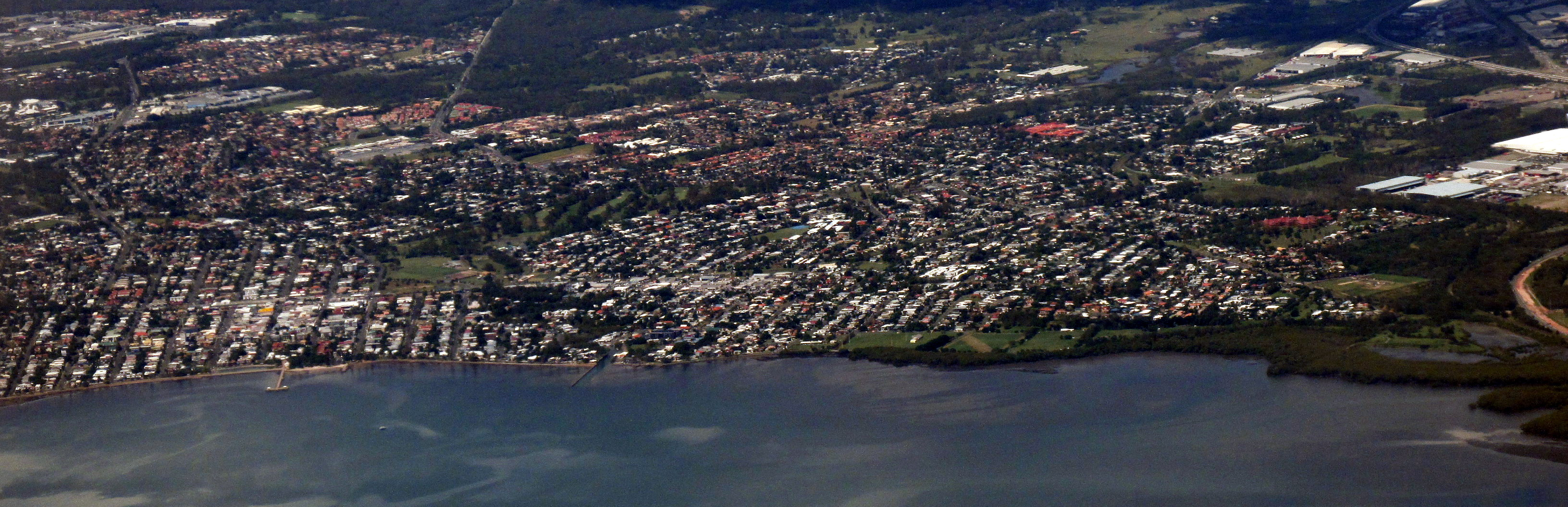
The suburb of Wynnum from Moreton Bay
