= Wynnum Ambulance Station =

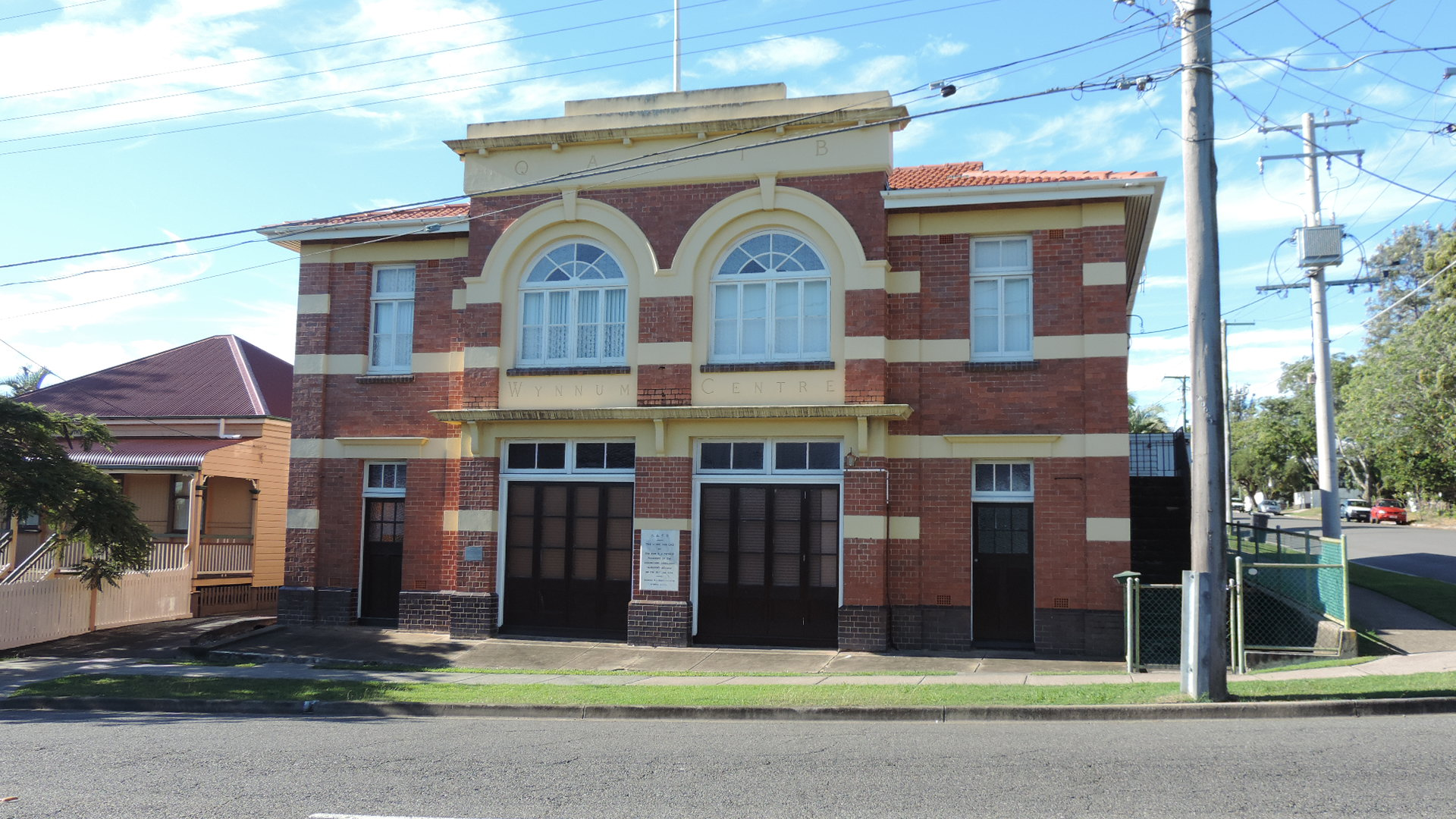
- Wynnum Ambulance Station, 2014

- Location within Queensland Location within Australia
- 27.4486°S 153.1745°E
- Location: 33 Tingal Road, Wynnum, City of Brisbane, Queensland, Australia

History
- Design period: 1919–1930s (interwar period)
- Built: 1926–27

Queensland Heritage Register
- Official name: Wynnum Ambulance Station (former), QATB Station
- Type: state heritage (built)
- Designated: 26 March 1999
- Reference no.: 601778
- Significant period: 1926–27 (fabric); 1920s–1990s (historical)
- Significant components: residential accommodation – superintendent's house/quarters, ambulance bay, residential accommodation – housing, garage

Wynnum Ambulance Station is a heritage-listed museum and former ambulance station at 33 Tingal Road, Wynnum, City of Brisbane, Queensland, Australia. It was built from 1926 to 1927. It is also known as the Queensland Ambulance Museum and the QATB Station. It was added to the Queensland Heritage Register on 26 March 1999. It is open by appointment.

== History ==
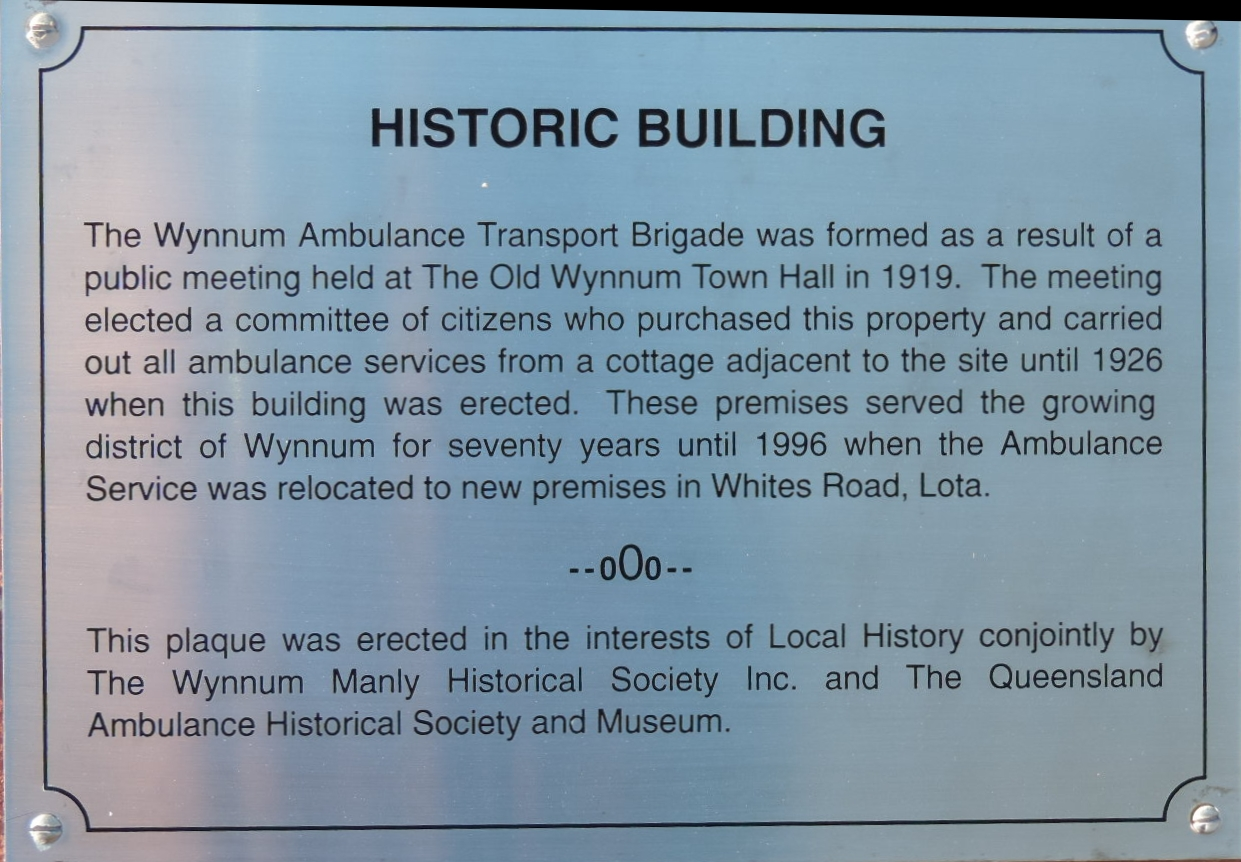
Plaque, Wynnum Ambulance Station, 2014

A landmark building within the streetscape of Wynnum, the former Wynnum Ambulance Centre is a testament to the considerable community support for the ambulance service. The building is tangible evidence of the reliance of the ambulance service on community goodwill, community financial support, volunteer labour and dedication of ambulance service employees.

During the early days of settlement in Brisbane the police assumed responsibility for treating accident victims and from 1884 the Defence Ambulance Corps of the Moreton Regiment shared some of this responsibility.

The City Ambulance Transport Brigade (CATB) was formed at a meeting of concerned citizens in September 1892 following the unsatisfactory management of an accident at a horse racing meeting. It was established that the principal object of the Brigade was to render first aid to the wounded and transport the sick and injured to hospital. Headquarters were established in the Courier Building (cnr Queen and Edward Streets, Brisbane). This was the first ambulance service in the world to employ paid staff.

Public use of the ambulance service steadily increased and voluntary subscriptions proved insufficient to meet associated outlays. In 1895 the CATB secured supplementary funding with the Queensland State Government agreeing to provide a 1:1 subsidy against subscriptions.

The first purpose-built ambulance building for Queensland was constructed in 1897 in Wharf Street, Brisbane. This building established the precedent for subsequent ambulance station designs. The design incorporated a two-storeyed building housing plant and staff facilities at ground level and a residence on the upper level. Large ground floor openings with bi-fold doors allowed ready access directly to the street for quick exit of horse and sulky.

During the late 1890s and early 1900s the ambulance service expanded establishing a number of centres throughout Queensland including Charters Towers (1900), Townsville (1900), Rockhampton (1901), Warwick (1901), Ipswich (1901), Toowoomba (1902), Mackay (1903), the heritage-listed Ravenswood Ambulance Station (1904), Cairns (1904) and Bundaberg (1907).

In 1902 the Brigade was restructured to better manage the rapidly expanding operations and to recognise the importance and contribution of regional ambulance centres. The reorganised entity became known as the Queensland Ambulance Transport Brigade (QATB). New headquarters were established in Ann Street, Brisbane in 1910.

By 1921, the earlier 1897 ambulance station model had developed and refined to become formally accepted as the preferred planning strategy for residential ambulance stations. Station buildings were to be two-storeyed with facilities for garaging, casualty treatment, first aid, sleeping quarters for ambulance bearers and a committee meeting room at ground level; superintendent's accommodation was provided at the upper level. This two level arrangement was preferred because it allowed the superintendent direct access to his work and as it housed the operations and the residence in one building under one roof it was considered to be more economical than constructing two separate buildings. In larger centres recreational facilities were also provided as well as accommodation for additional staff who slept on the premises. Ambulance stations of substantial scale and street presence were constructed throughout Queensland as a consequence of this policy.

Government assistance to QATB continued through direct subsidy and the Department of Public Works was responsible for the design and construction of the ambulance station buildings. From 1927 there were a number of legislative changes culminating in 1991 when the QATB was disbanded and the Queensland Transport Ambulance Service (QAS) was established as a division of the Bureau of Emergency Services.

This comment appearing in the Telegraph newspaper in 1902 offers an indication of the community perception of the ambulance service at the time and it may be argued still holds true today: "There are certain established associations working for the benefit of humanity at large. Of such associations the Ambulance Brigade has now become probably one of the most familiar and important. We can scarcely bring ourselves to believe that it has not existed forever. When any association holds this position in the mind, it may be ranked amongst the permanent institutions of society".

The ambulance service in Wynnum In the south-east of Brisbane, Wynnum is part of a foreshore along Moreton Bay. From the 1840s, this area became a popular fishing location and many early non-indigenous settlers established farms in the area. The first land sales were conducted in 1860 at Lytton and around Waterloo Bay. The railway link to Cleveland via Wynnum in 1888 was a major impetus to closer settlement with large areas of land being taken up soon after. The district expanded rapidly over the next twenty years until in 1913 the Town Council of Wynnum was constituted. The area became known as a seaside resort and the Wynnum and Manly foreshore area became increasingly popular with day visitors and holiday-makers.

Wynnum was perceived to be a "healthy" place to live with its sea breezes, protected beaches, vistas to Moreton Bay, fishing and availability of fresh local produce. The district continued to expand as the number of permanent residents increased; services and infrastructure were introduced; building activity expanded; and civic and community associations were established.

The Wynnum ambulance service was an important civic and community association to emerge in response to the expansion of the district. It had it beginnings in 1915 when a first aid post was established in a tent on the beach at Wynnum to serve holiday makers visiting the area during Easter and Christmas holidays.

As the catchment area serviced by the Ann Street Ambulance Station of the QATB expanded, sub-branches were established in satellite areas and adjoining municipalities. These were strategically located to link with existing rail infrastructure to provide connections to major hospitals in the Brisbane centre. Wynnum was a suitable location for establishing an ambulance station being the centre of a thriving district and on the rail link to Brisbane. The Wynnum sub-branch was formed in 1919 at a public meeting took temporary accommodation in a cottage at 92 or 95 Tingal Road, Wynnum. The Wynnum Ambulance Station covers the area from Lytton to Redland Bay bordered by Doughboy Creek. Sub-committees were formed for areas within the district: Hemmant, Lindum and Tingalpa; Wynnum and Wynnum South; Manly; Birkdale; Wellington Point; Victoria Point; Redland Bay; Ormiston and Cleveland.

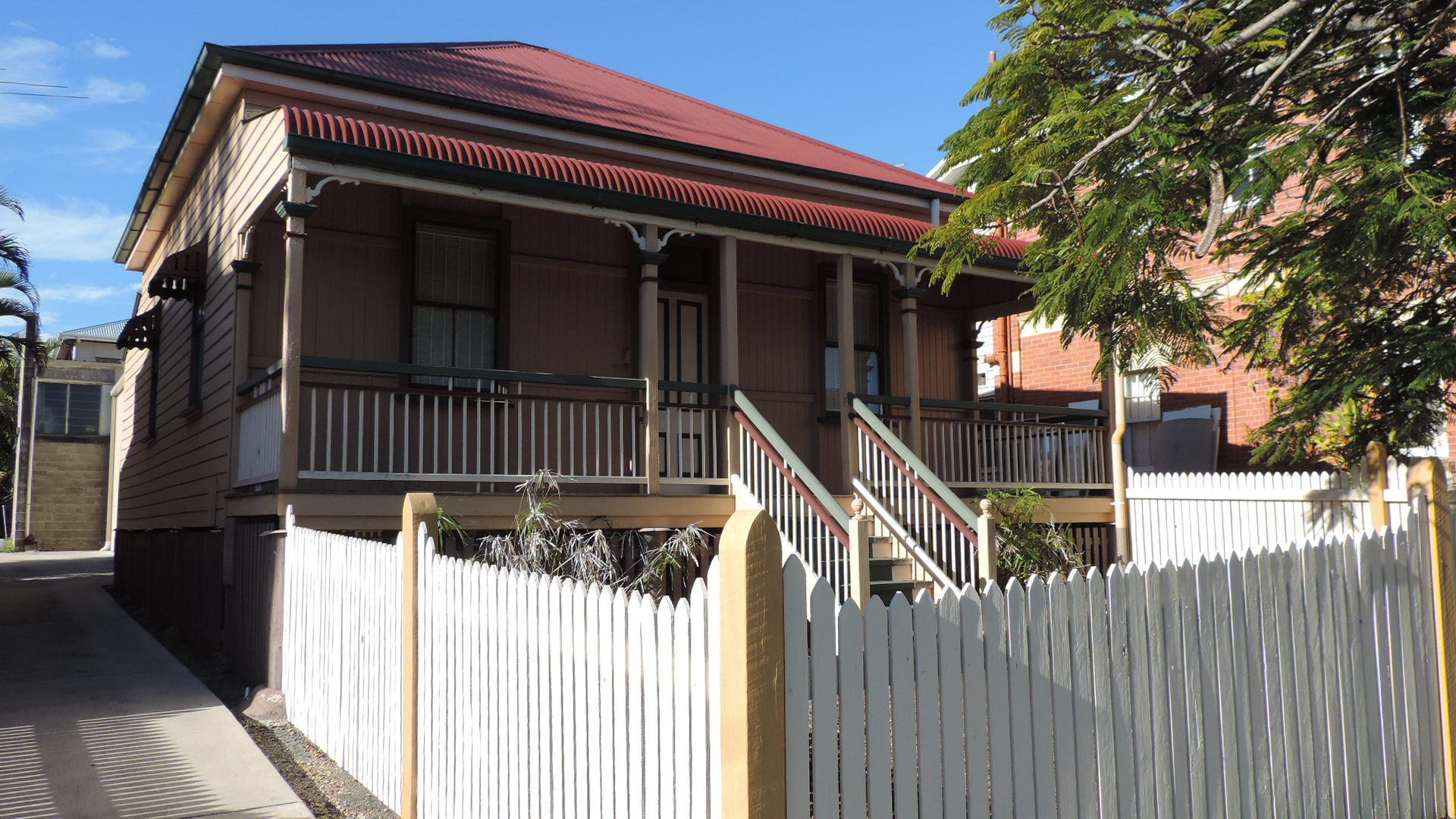
Cottage at 35 Tingal Road, used as ambulance station from 1922 to 1927

In 1920 the Wynnum Ambulance Committee acquired lots 248 and 249 on the corner of Tingal Road and Cedar Street, Wynnum. This site was well located; close to the railway, on the main road and close to the service district of Wynnum. This was to become the site for the 1927 ambulance station. By 1921 Wynnum was gazetted as a self-governing ambulance centre. Lot 247 was acquired in 1922 and ambulance operations and superintendent's accommodation transferred to the cottage at 35 Tingal Road, Wynnum. The front verandah functioned as a storage area and casualty room for the fledgling ambulance service until the new purpose-built station opened in 1927. A garage for the ambulance vehicle was constructed at the rear of Lots 248 and 249.

In the early days many ambulance volunteers were school teachers. Stretchers were housed at Wynnum Central School and calls for ambulance assistance were directed to the school. The teacher/teachers would place the patient on a train that was met by Brisbane Ambulance bearers at South Brisbane Station

Wynnum was a rapidly growing district and accommodation and equipment for the ambulance service soon proved to be inadequate in the face of this expansion. During 1923, the Wynnum community began fundraising for a new purpose-built Wynnum Ambulance Station to be located on the Tingal Road/Cedar Street corner. The enthusiasm of the local community for the new building and the work of the ambulance brigade was evident in the parade of floats, processions and carnival led by mounted police and the South Brisbane Scottish Pipe Band on the day of the laying of the foundation stone. Community support was evident also in their fundraising efforts for the building. By day of the laying of the foundation stone the community had raised £1384/4/5 towards the estimated £4200 construction cost of the proposed building.

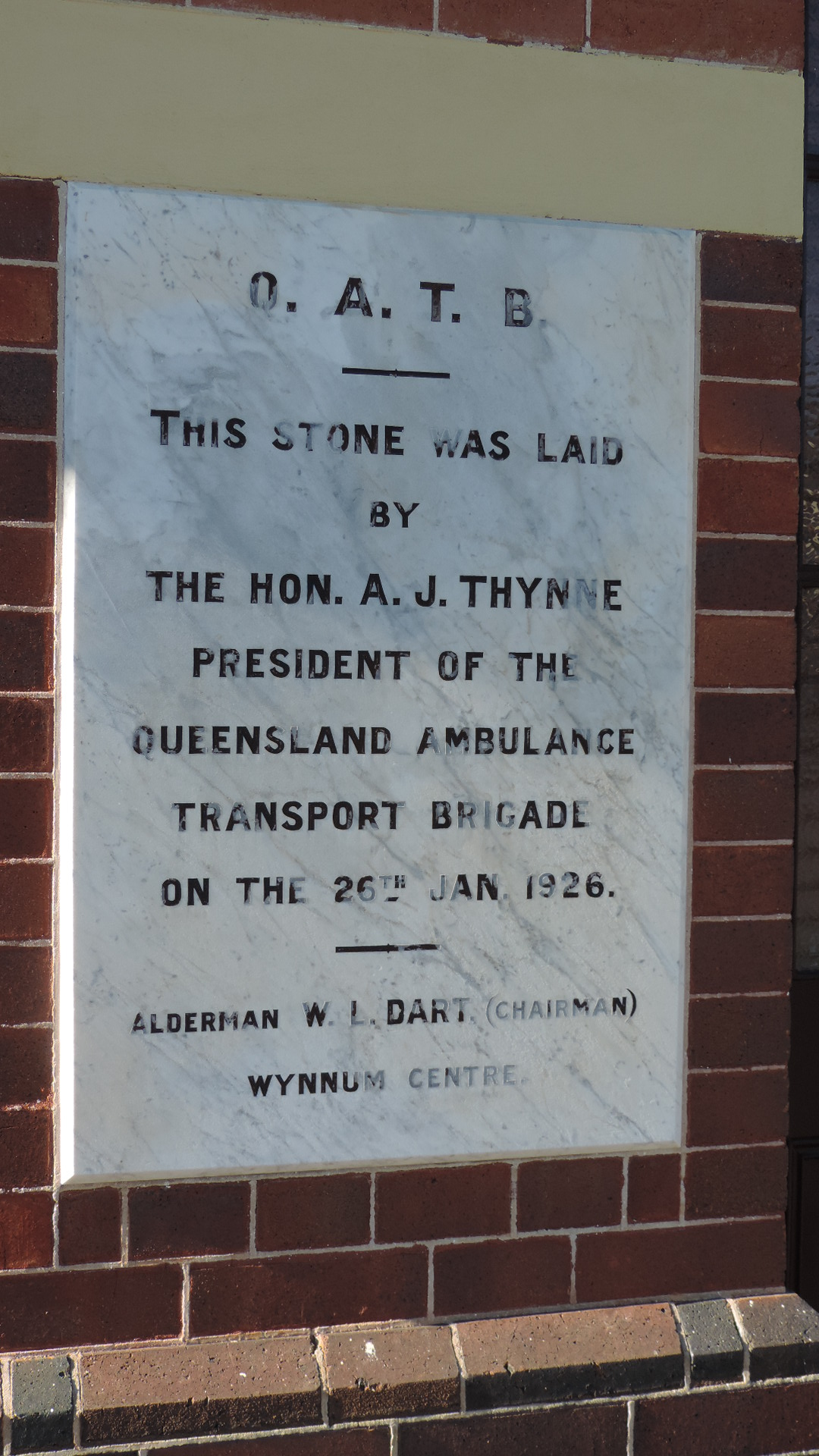
Foundation stone, Wynnum Ambulance Station, 2014

The foundation stone was laid on 26 January 1926 by Christina Jane Thynne, standing in for her ill husband, Colonel Andrew Joseph Thynne (first President of the QATB Central Executive). At this ceremony she relayed her husband's message that "an ambulance has now become an indisputable part of every town in Queensland. That is a peculiarly Queensland characteristic, and the people are proud of the efficient service... The establishment of a centre is beneficial to any district, not only because of its evidence of one of the highest forms of civic spirit in making provision for the quick and efficient first aid to the sick and injured. It is an effort towards fulfilling one of the noblest principles of Christianity, the love of one's neighbour."

On this occasion the Hon. Walter Henry Barnes, Member of the Queensland Legislative Assembly for Wynnum for the district observed that "if any one wants to find practical Christianity he could find it among those doing ambulance work. The new, up-to-date premises would be a splendid advertisement for the growing district."

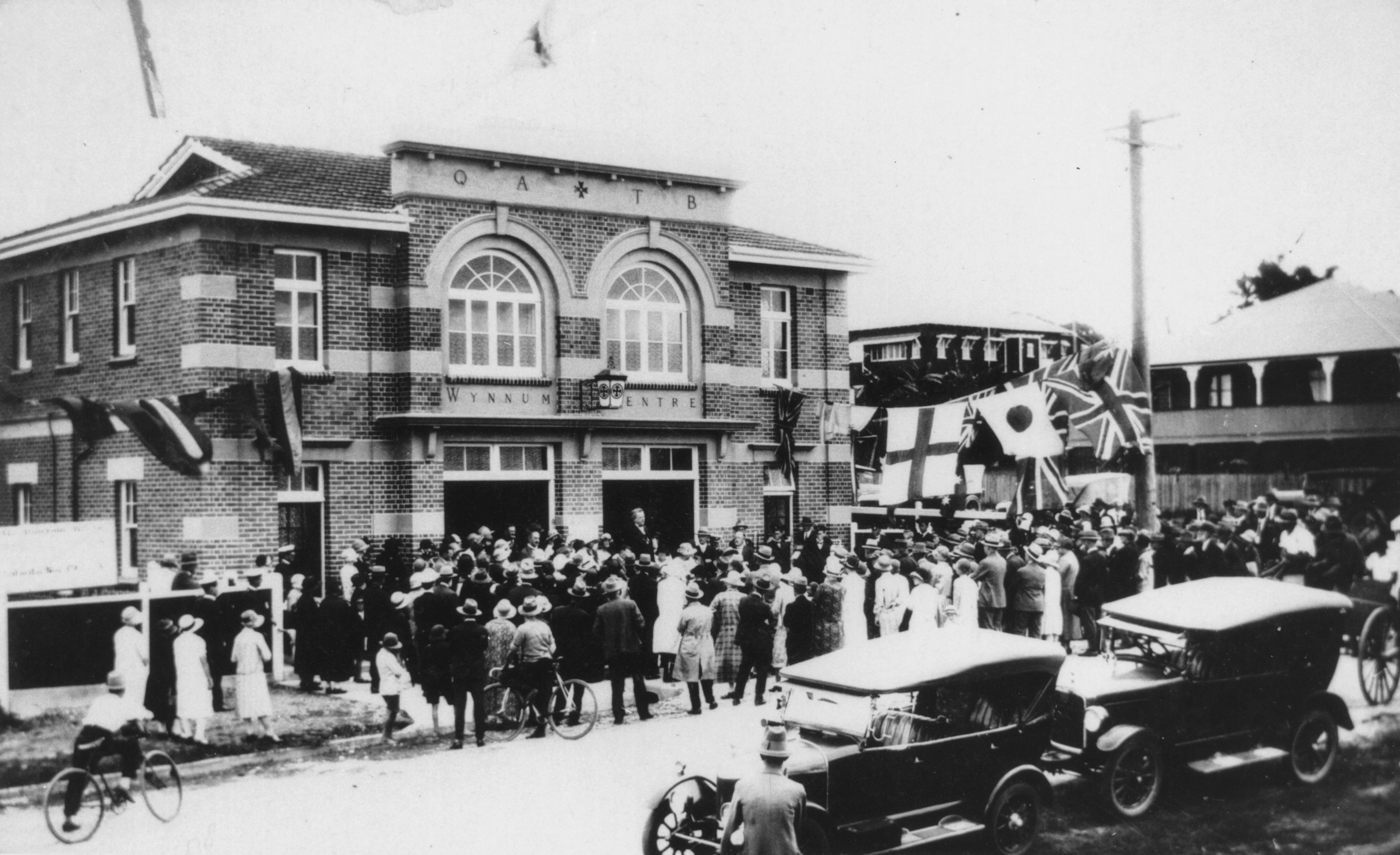
Opening day at the Wynnum Ambulance Centre, 19 November 1926

The new ambulance station, constructed at a cost of £3284/19/1, was opened on 19 November 1927. The Department of Public Works contributed £750 towards the construction costs with the balance being raised by the Wynnum community. The Architectural and Building Journal of Queensland commented that the Wynnum Ambulance Brigade opened its "commodious premises" on Tingal Road and that "the design is pleasing in effect and marks a valuable step in the march of progress in the Wynnum District." The drawings were prepared by the Department of Public Works and the design is attributed to Leonard Kempster. The contractor was Mr C.R. Schriver.

Leonard James Kempster was employed as an architect in the War Office and in private practice in London in 1890s to 1911. From 1911 to 1946 he was employed in the architectural office of the Department of Public Works (Queensland). Kempster's other ambulance work includes the design and documentation of the Childers QATB station in 1924. The Wynnum Ambulance Station building design reflected contemporary thinking for ambulance stations in regional centres. It is a two-storeyed building with the superintendent's residence occupying the upper level connected by rear stairs to the lower level. Accommodation for the superintendent was provided upstairs to give the superintendent a better opportunity to attend to the work of the station. The lower-level houses the ambulance plant room, office, committee room, bearers' dayroom and bedroom, casualty room and bathroom.

A QATB subcentre was established in Cleveland in 1946. As this and other subcentres were established the demand on the Wynnum Ambulance Station eased.

From 1940 to 1995 various alterations and additions were made to the sheds, garages and cottages on the property. In the 1940s a garage (2 cars), workshop and store were constructed to the rear of the station on the boundary. In 1995 the superintendent vacated the upper level of the Ambulance Station building. The Tingal Road Ambulance Station ceased operation in 1996 when it was replaced by a new ambulance centre adjacent to Wynnum Hospital at Whites Road, Wynnum.

The upper level of the former Wynnum Ambulance Station is presently occupied by the Community Education Unit for the Greater Brisbane Region of the QAS and the lower-level houses the Queensland Ambulance Service Historical Society (QASHS) and the Wynnum Historical Society. The QASHS operates the Queensland Ambulance Museum from the premises. Its collection includes several historic ambulances, including a 1926 Arrol Johnson ambulance. The museum is only open by appointment.

== Description ==
A two-storeyed red face brick building, the former Wynnum Ambulance Station occupies a prominent site on the corner of Tingal Road and Cedar Street, Wynnum with the main elevation to Tingal Road. The building is positioned to the front of the allotment and is highly visible in the streetscape.

Sitting on a plinth of blue bricks, the building is symmetrical about a parapeted projecting breakfront. The breakfront has two wide doorways with bifold doors for vehicle access at ground level and two large recessed arched windows at the upper level. The bifold doors to the right hand side doorway have been replaced with aluminium framed glass sliding doors. Prominent cream rendered banding wraps the building and gives emphasis to the corners and the breakfront. The double doorway main entrance is defined by a plain projecting cornice sitting on three heavy brackets. Plain rendered arches with prominent keystones frame the central upper-level windows. The letters QATB sit at the top of the parapet below an entablature composed of a plain cornice and chunky dentils. The spandrels below the arched windows contain the words Wynnum Centre. The breakfront is flanked by bays framed by pilasters. At ground level each bay has a single doorway defined by a small plain projecting canopy. The building is crowned by a gambrel tiled roof. A flagpole rises above the parapet.

The elevation to Cedar Street is less grand than the main elevation to Tingal Road. As the residential entrance to the superintendent's living quarters it is of a domestic scale appropriate to the streetscape. Corner pilasters emphasised by vertical rendered banding define the brick portion of this elevation. A timber framed annexe attaches to the right hand side and is clad with weatherboards. An external concrete stair, parallel to the elevation, arrives at the central entrance to the living quarters on the upper level. This entrance has a bifold timber door and is marked by a small bracketed overhang.

The rear elevation is obscured by four garage bays each enclosed by a tilt-up door. The corner bays of the Station building are clad with weather boards. The timber upper-level verandah has been enclosed with casement windows at a later date.

The elevation to the north has corner pilasters emphasised by vertical rendered banding. At ground level the elevation is divided into two equal bays by a pilaster which finishes in a plain cornice separating the upper and lower levels of the elevation. Each lower bay has a sash window.

The operational areas of the Station are housed at ground level and the living quarters for the superintendent occupy the upper level. At the ground floor the large entry doorways open into a drive through plant room surrounded by subsidiary spaces including a committee room, office, bathroom, bearers' bedroom, bearers' dayroom and casualty room. The minor front entrances open into the committee room to the left and the casualty room to the right. A timber platform has been built over the concrete floor to the plant room. The loggia to the rear of the building accommodating a car washing space and laundry has been enclosed with weatherboards and the former rear door to the plant room relocated to the centre of this outer wall. The garages constructed immediately to the rear on a raised concrete plinth have blocked the drive through route of the plant room. Internal stairs in the laundry connect to the residence in the upper level.

The residence on the upper level is arranged about a north–south corridor with three bedrooms and dining room fronting Tingal Road and kitchen, sitting room and a bedroom opening to a verandah facing north-east. Rear stairs adjacent to the kitchen give direct access to the ground floor laundry and provide a rear door for the residence. Entrance is gained from Cedar Street via an external concrete staircase arriving at the central organising corridor. A number of partitions and door leaves have been removed. The rear verandah has been enclosed with casement windows. A toilet and laundry and associated rooftop drying area have been added off the north-east corner of the verandah.

A garage which was constructed to the rear of the site off Cedar Street has been demolished. Additional vehicle accommodation and workshop space has been constructed to the rear of the Station. Parallel to Cedar Street six bays of garages and workshops in brick and timber stretch from the rear of the Station building to the rear boundary. Four bays lie adjacent and parallel to the rear of the Station.

The adjacent timber-framed cottage is clad with chamferboards, sits on short timber stumps and is covered by a pyramid roof. The cottage has four rooms organised off a central corridor, an attached kitchen wing and front and rear verandahs. The front steps have been removed and the front verandah balustrades sheeted with fibro. The rear verandah is enclosed and accommodates a small porch and toilet. Within the cottage, several partitions have been removed and new openings made. Some stumps have been replaced with steel columns.

== Heritage listing ==
The former Wynnum Ambulance Station was listed on the Queensland Heritage Register on 26 March 1999 having satisfied the following criteria.

The place is important in demonstrating the evolution or pattern of Queensland's history.

With the associated cottage and garages/workshops, the former Ambulance Station demonstrates the evolution of the site and the development of ambulance services in the Wynnum district in response to changes in technology and increased demand for the services. As the earlier ambulance station, the adjacent cottage is important as part of the complex showing the progress of the ambulance service from temporary accommodation to a purpose-built building. The location of the Station demonstrates the importance of the railway link to Wynnum which facilitated the transfer of patients to the hospitals in Brisbane City. The Wynnum ambulance service was an important civic and community association that emerged in response to the expansion of the Wynnum district during the early decades of the twentieth century.

The place demonstrates rare, uncommon or endangered aspects of Queensland's cultural heritage.

The former Wynnum Ambulance Station survives as the only known example of an early masonry residential ambulance station for Queensland.

The place is important in demonstrating the principal characteristics of a particular class of cultural places.

The former Wynnum Ambulance Station is an important example of the early design for residential ambulance stations in Queensland, a two-storeyed building incorporating ambulance service facilities at ground level and living quarters at the upper level, developed and refined from the first purpose-built headquarters in Wharf Street, Brisbane (1897). The building is substantially intact and is important for demonstrating the principal characteristics of early residential ambulance stations.

The place is important because of its aesthetic significance.

The former Wynnum Ambulance Station makes a substantial contribution to the streetscape. This building belongs within the tradition of well composed civic buildings, including police stations, courthouses and schools, designed by the Department of Public Works prior to World War II.

The place has a special association with the life or work of a particular person, group or organisation of importance in Queensland's history.

The former Wynnum Ambulance Station building is important for its association with the Queensland Ambulance Service (formerly QATB) during its phase of expansion into outer Brisbane and Queensland regional areas.
