= Wynnum railway station =

Railway station in Queensland, Australia

Wynnum
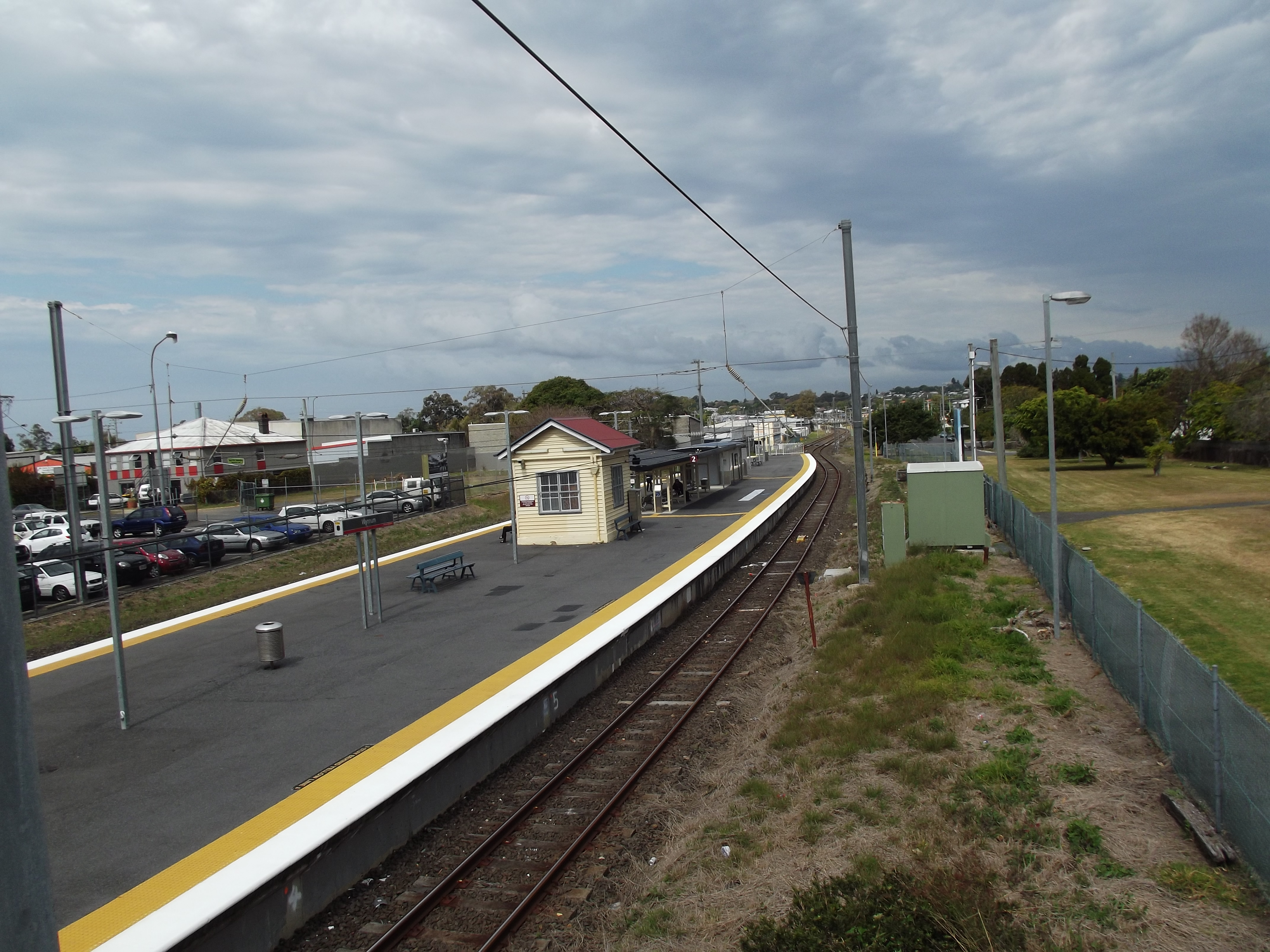
- Southbound view of Platform 2, August 2012

General information
- Location: Thorn Street, Wynnum
- Coordinates: 27°26′23″S 153°09′58″E
- Owner: Queensland Rail
- Operator: Queensland Rail
- Line: T4 Cleveland
- Distance: 21.68 kilometres from Central
- Platforms: 2 (1 island)
- Tracks: 2

Construction
- Structure type: Ground
- Parking: 37 bays
- Cycle facilities: Yes
- Accessible: No

Other information
- Station code: 600266 (platform 1); 600267 (platform 2)
- Fare zone: Zone 2
- Website: Translink

Services
Preceding station	Queensland Rail	Following station
Wynnum North towards Shorncliffe via Roma Street	T4 Cleveland line	Wynnum Central towards Cleveland
Location

Wynnum is a railway station operated by Queensland Rail on the Cleveland line. It opened in 1889 and serves the Brisbane suburb of Wynnum. It is a ground level station, featuring one island platform with two faces.

== Services ==
Wynnum is served by Cleveland line services from Shorncliffe, Northgate, Doomben and Bowen Hills to Manly & Cleveland.

== Platforms and services ==
Wynnum platform arrangement
Platform	Line	Destination	Notes
1	T4 Cleveland	Cleveland	
2	T4 Cleveland	Roma Street (to Shorncliffe line)	
