= Wynnum State High School Block A =

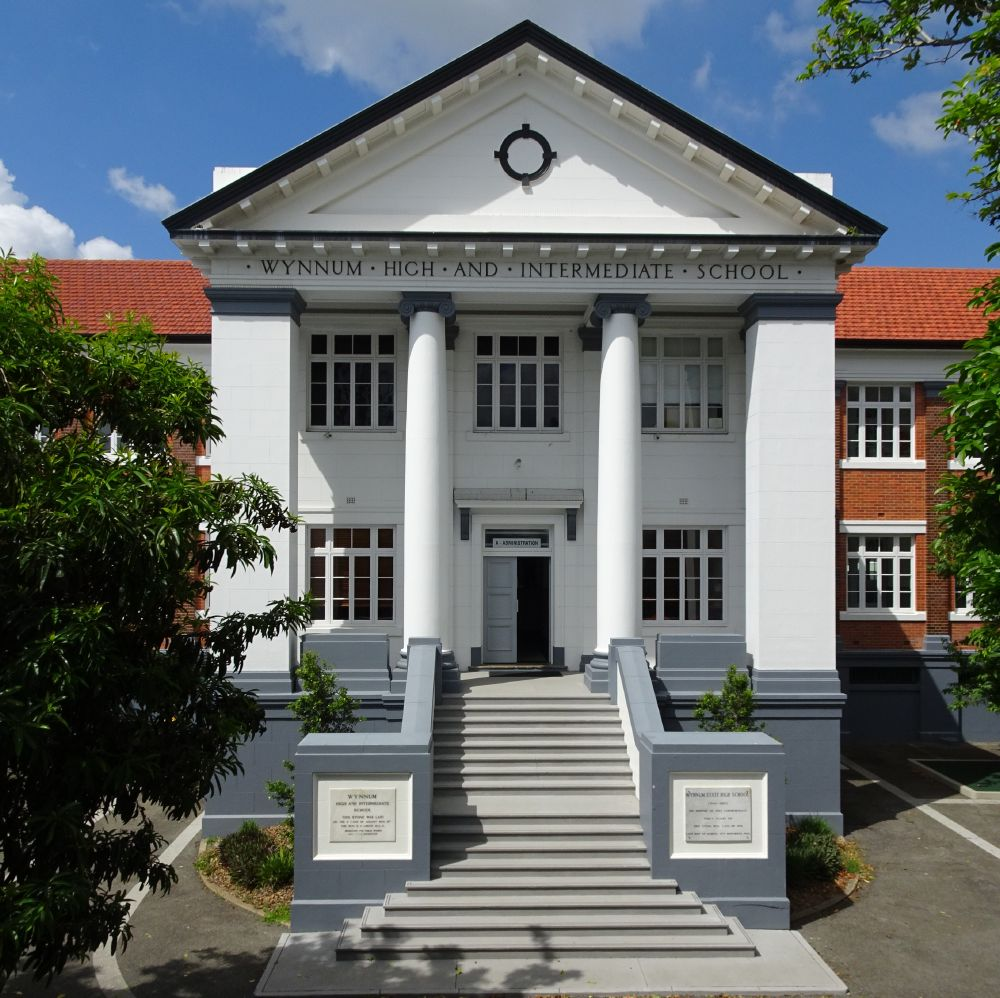
- Wynnum State High School Block A, 2018

- Location within Queensland
- 27.4543°S 153.1763°E
- Location: Peel Street, Wynnum, City of Brisbane, Queensland, Australia

History
- Design period: 1919–1930s (Interwar period)
- Built: 1919, 1943, 1953, 1955

Site notes
- Architectural style: Classicism

Queensland Heritage Register
- Official name: Wynnum State High School; Wynnum State High and Intermediate School; Wynnum High and Intermediate School; Wynnum High School
- Type: state heritage
- Designated: 28 June 2018
- Reference no.: 650059
- Type: Education, Research, Scientific Facility: School – state (high)
- Theme: Creating social and cultural institutions: Commemorating significant events; Educating Queenslanders: Providing secondary education

Wynnum State High School Block A is a heritage-listed building at Wynnum State High School, Peel Street, Wynnum, City of Brisbane, Queensland, Australia. It was built in 1943. It was added to the Queensland Heritage Register on 28 June 2018.

== History ==
Located approximately 15 km east of the Brisbane central business district (CBD), Wynnum State High School (SHS) was established in 1942 as Wynnum State High and Intermediate School. It retains a suburban brick school building (Block A, built in 1943), set within landscaped grounds including a stone retaining wall (built in 1955), mature trees, and a World War I (WWI) Memorial Avenue (built in 1919). The school has a strong and ongoing association with its surrounding community.

Originally part of the lands of the Turrbal people, British settlement of the Wynnum-Manly district occurred in the 1860s when two sugar mills, called Lota and Wyvernleigh, were established. Agriculture became the principal occupation of the district, while the Wynnum foreshore became popular with holiday makers and holiday homes were constructed along the bay.

The site of the future Wynnum SHS was sold as the 98-acre (40 ha) Portion 77 in 1864. Its subdivision into housing allotments quickly followed the construction of the Cleveland railway line, which reached Wynnum and Manly in 1888 (and reached Cleveland in November 1889) and provided a major impetus to closer settlement. In 1889, local government for the area became centred on Wynnum when Kianawah Division was excised from Bulimba Division. The district expanded rapidly over the next 20 years, leading to the establishment of the Town of Wynnum in 1913. The area became known as a seaside resort and the Wynnum and Manly foreshore area became increasingly popular with day visitors and holiday-makers. It was incorporated into Greater Brisbane in 1925.

Wynnum Memorial Park, originally a 21-acre (8.5 ha) reserve located between Wynnum and Manly, was set aside for showgrounds in 1918. First known as Russell Park after the then mayor, Richard Russell, it was renamed Memorial Park when the memorial avenue, accessed from Peel Street, was planted in 1919. Sir Hamilton John Goold-Adams, Governor of Queensland, opened the Memorial Avenue and planted its first tree on 27 July 1919. Around 60 trees were planted by the families of soldiers who died in the war. The Wynnum Town Council purchased the park land in 1923, and the reserve was used as a showground, sportsground and recreation area for residents in the Wynnum-Manly area.

Primary schools were established in the growing district: at Wynnum North (1882), Wynnum Central (1896), Manly (1910), and Wynnum West (1922), but the Queensland Government was slow to establish state secondary education, considering secondary education to be of little relevance to Queensland's economy which was based on agriculture, forestry and mining. The Grammar Schools Act 1860 provided scholarships for high-achieving students to attend elite grammar schools, although few were awarded. It was not until 1912 that the government instituted a high school system, whereby separate high schools were established in major towns or, where the student population was too small, a primary school was expanded to include a "high top". High tops were an economical measure that provided essentially the same education while utilising already established facilities.

In Wynnum, a high top, called Wynnum SHS, operated at the Wynnum Central School between 1918 and 1921, drawing students from a wide catchment. The first qualifying examination for entrance to the high school, which entitled the successful scholars to two years' free higher education, were held in 1917. Wynnum State High School students sat the University of Queensland's Junior Public Examination in 1919 and 1920. However, the high top closed in June 1921 due to insufficient enrolments, forcing students to travel to Brisbane State High School.

Community advocacy for a high school in the Wynnum-Manly area continued. Land was purchased in 1929 for an intermediate school, for which a building was designed by 1933, but construction did not proceed. Finally, in March 1938 the Minister for Public Instruction (Frank Cooper) announced an Intermediate School would be built at Wynnum as soon as a suitable site was obtained. It was to be followed by a high school.

The idea of creating an intermediate level of schooling emerged in Queensland during the late 1920s. This was intended to be a transition between primary and secondary schooling. Intermediate schools catered for years 6 and 7, and offered vocational subjects: manual training for boys and domestic science for girls. The first intermediate schools were established within existing school facilities at Warwick, Charters Towers, Mount Morgan and South Brisbane from 1928. By 1937 there were 11 intermediate schools in Queensland, most were accommodated through re-use or remodeling of existing buildings. Intermediate schools included: Brisbane South Girls and Infants School (1929), Mount Morgan State High School (1929), Roma (1929), Charters Towers (1929), Gatton (1933), Gympie (1933), Bundaberg (1933), Mackay Central State School (1933), Brisbane North (Kelvin Grove) (1935), Maryborough State High School (1936), and Ayr State High School (1936).

In 1939, the Department of Public Instruction (DPI) completed negotiations with the Brisbane City Council (BCC) to exchange Primrose Park for a portion of Wynnum Memorial Park as the site of the new school. One of the deciding factors in the choice of location was the memorial park's proximity to the Manly railway station. For many years, the Memorial Park had been used by the Wynnum Horticultural and Industrial Society, but more recently had been used exclusively as a sports venue.

Between the announcement of the intermediate school in 1938 and its plans being drawn in April 1939, the government decided that both intermediate and high school functions would proceed together. The school would be Brisbane's first suburban state high and intermediate school.

Although not constructed as part of the Depression-era program, the Wynnum Intermediate and High School's suburban brick school building reflected the design influences of many of the buildings from that program. Most were designed in a classical idiom to project the sense of stability and optimism which the government sought to convey through the architecture of its public buildings. Frequently, they were two storeys above an open understorey and built to accommodate up to 1.000 students. They adopted a symmetrical plan form and often exhibited a prominent central entry. The plan arrangement was similar to that of timber buildings, being only one classroom deep and accessed by a long straight verandah or corridor. Classrooms were commonly divided by folding timber partitions and the understorey was used for covered play space, storage, ablutions and other functions.

By the end of 1939, preparations were in place for the construction of Wynnum State High and Intermediate School on a site of just over 2 acres (0.81 ha) excised from the Wynnum Memorial Park, which included most of the memorial avenue. The remainder of the site continued as Wynnum Memorial Park, providing a reserve, play facilities and sporting grounds for the local community. The Wynnum High and Intermediate School building was to be sited at the east end of the Memorial Park. The school's narrow road frontage to Peel Street meant the school building could not face the street, which was the standard position for a suburban brick school building. Instead, the Wynnum building spanned the widest part of its allotment and faced the Memorial Park, enabling unobstructed views of the impressive, classically inspired building from the park, and vice versa.

The Queensland Department of Public Works (DPW) was responsible for the design of high school buildings from their introduction in 1912. The first high schools were established within existing technical colleges, utilising their buildings. Purpose-built high school buildings were constructed from 1917 and were large elaborate buildings, which were variations of a standard design introduced in 1914, as well as vocational buildings built to standard designs. Queensland high schools also included purpose-built science laboratories, domestic science buildings, workshops for woodwork and metal work, libraries, and gymnasiums.

Wynnum's planned two-storey brick and concrete building, with understorey, had a colonnaded entrance portico forming a central feature and a Marseille tile roof, finished with a fleche. It was designed for 626 pupils. Within the building were 13 classrooms for general tuition, accommodating 516 pupils. In the understorey was accommodation for a manual training workshop for woodworking and sheet metal classes for approximately 20 pupils. The understorey also housed lavatories and store rooms, with the remainder utilised as play area. The first floor accommodated a domestic science section for approximately 20 pupils, with rooms for cooking, dressmaking and laundry work, plus a fitting room and small dining room. On the second floor were two rooms for commercial subjects, a science laboratory, balance room and a lecture room for approximately 70 pupils. The first and second floors also housed the head teacher's room, two teachers' rooms and four hat-and-cloak rooms. Folding partitions were fitted in first and second floor classrooms and a stage was included at the western end of the first floor. The grounds around the building were excavated, levelled and graded as required, and necessary surface drains formed.

On 23 January 1941, the Minister for Public Works and Public Instruction (Harry Bruce) announced that the government had approved expenditure for the erection of a High and Intermediate School at Wynnum by the DPW. By the end of June 1941, construction of the school building had commenced. The corner stone for the Wynnum SHS building was laid on 21 August 1941 by the Minister for Works and Education (Harry Bruce), in the presence of Bill Dart, the Member of the Queensland Legislative Assembly for Wynnum.

The entry of Japan into World War II and the commencement of the Pacific theatre of war with its feared invasion of Australia, meant construction projects in Brisbane, including Wynnum High and Intermediate School, were reviewed to determine whether they should proceed. Work on the Wynnum High and Intermediate School did continue and in February 1942, the completion of the high school portion of the building was announced. Intending pupils were advised to enrol, but the Queensland Government closed all coastal state schools in January 1942 due to invasion fears. However, most Queensland schools reopened on 2 March 1942.

When high school pupils commenced at Wynnum SHS on 2 March 1942, the roof was still under construction and there were a few usable first-floor rooms, but none were completed. Water had been connected and the septic system installed, but there was no power. There was no equipment for classwork or recreation. Domestic science and manual training students had to go to Wynnum Central State School for those subjects. As at other Queensland state schools, slit trenches were dug to protect students from air raids. At Wynnum SHS, male pupils dug these trenches in the area occupied by the swimming pool (as at 2018). Air-raid drills were conducted and windows were taped.

Work on the school building (Block A) was completed before intermediate school pupils joined the high school pupils at the Wynnum High and Intermediate School in 1943. The school was officially opened by the Minister for Education, Arthur Jones, on Saturday 17 July 1943. A newspaper report of the event recorded:

"The school has supplied a long felt want in the district, and has obviated pupils having to travel to Brisbane. It is probably one of the best situated schools in the State. [It is b]uilt on rising park land with a ready-made sports oval and grandstand..."

Community involvement and school fundraising were important factors in the development of the school. Fancy dress balls became a popular annual event from their commencement in May 1945, while school fetes were regular and important fund-raising events for the school from 1950.

An important component of Queensland state schools was their grounds. The early and continuing commitment to play-based education, particularly in primary school, resulted in the provision of outdoor play space and sporting facilities, such as ovals and tennis courts. Trees and gardens were planted to shade and beautify schools. In 1925 the Brisbane City Council took over the management of the Brisbane City Botanic Gardens from the Queensland Government. The donation of trees from the gardens to schools waned considerably, when the Queensland Government reduced its subsidy for tree planting in schools. From 1931 the number of trees circulated to schools dropped to less than 200 trees down from thousands in the 1890s. In 1947, the Wynnum State High and Intermediate School's Parents and Citizens Committee (P&C) outlined its plans for improving the school grounds. These included:

- acquisition of more land including the adjacent Commonwealth drill shed
- a parade ground
- a retaining wall behind Block A to curb erosion
- properly-made roads within the school area
- planting of 60 trees.

Once the war-time slit trenches had been filled and levelled, with the assistance of a government subsidy, the immediate provision of tennis courts on that area became a priority and were completed in 1951.

The addition of land to the school grounds came to fruition in 1949 and 1950. In July 1949, 0.45 hectares (1.1 acres) adjoining the school along the railway alignment was added. The school absorbed a further 1.68 hectares (4.2 acres) from the east end of the Wynnum Memorial Park in 1950 for its school sports oval. The remaining 5.63 hectares (13.9 acres) of Wynnum Memorial Park continued as a reserve, providing play and sporting facilities for the local community and the school.

Work on the school grounds was a priority throughout the 1950s. Serious consideration was given to the lawns and gardens in front of Block A, to ensure the natural advantages of the setting overlooking Memorial Park were retained. Subsequently, a number of shade trees were planted and pergolas erected in front of Block A by the school's P&C. The area to the east and south of the main building was bituminised c. 1953 for use as a parade ground. Erosion of the embankment formed behind Block A when the site was levelled for the school building, led to the construction of a stone-pitched wall and a new set of concrete stairs in 1955. Approval for the school's sports oval was given in May 1955 and it was reported that its formation was approaching completion in 1957, as was the part-stone facing of the bank to the oval. However, a year later the oval was still incomplete and students could not take part in organised sport.

The DPI was largely unprepared for the enormous demand for state education between the late 1940s and the 1960s. This was a nation-wide occurrence resulting from immigration and the unprecedented population growth now termed the "baby boom". Queensland schools were overcrowded and, to cope, many new buildings were constructed and existing buildings were extended. At Wynnum High and Intermediate School, increased student numbers led to overcrowding and a shortage of classrooms. To alleviate this, the school used the Manly Drill Hall (located on Commonwealth land, southeast of Block A) from 1 August 1949 until 19 February 1951. In the early 1950s, a two-storey timber block of classrooms (Block B) was erected to the east of Block A. In December 1953, it was announced that four additional classrooms were to be built.

The school population continued to grow, reaching 1,000 by the school's 20th anniversary in 1962; however, the opening of a second high school for the bayside district at Wynnum North in 1964 eased the population pressure.

Further buildings were added to the site during the 1960s and 1970s. In 1960, there were three classroom buildings to the northeast of Block A. During the 1962–63 financial year, a manual training building was added to the northeast of the site. A senior science block was added during the 1966–67 financial year. The school assembly hall, designed by Conrad and Gargett, was opened on 13 March 1971 by the Hon Max Hodges. It was located on the site of the drill hall, which had been purchased c. 1967, and cleared soon after April 1969. During the 1970s, Block F was extended, and Block G was built, a Machine Annexe was completed and a Music and Science Block (Block I) erected. A new library was officially opened on 3 April 1976. By July 1976, the school comprised the suburban brick school building (Block A) and Blocks D-I, plus an assembly hall, and a modular machine annex. Blocks J, M and N and a school pool on the former tennis court site were subsequently added to the school grounds.

Alterations and repairs have been made to Block A since its completion. Repointing of brickwork took place in 1955. Repairs to the school's front door, and to ceiling joists, wall plate, roof rafters and battens, cover strips and cornice, and fibro ceiling in the chemistry laboratory were undertaken after a fire in November 1958. Alterations included: infilling under Block A to create an Oslo Lunch tuckshop in 1960, conversion of a hat-and=bag room on the second floor into a staff room in 1964; creation of a senior mistresses room on the first floor and a girls rest room on the second floor, to the north of the south staircase, in 1967. In the same year, the roof fleche was removed because of dry rot. Enclosure of the middle section of the understorey had occurred by the 1970s.

Between 1972 and 1992, the P&C focused on extensions to the school oval and cricket practice wickets, and solving drainage problems. Raising money for the construction of a half-size Olympic swimming pool and new basketball courts, and associated landscaping were the focus during the 1970s and 1980s, with funds raised through "walkathons". To celebrate the school's 50th anniversary in 1992, a school history was written.

Over time, the north extent of the Memorial Avenue has been disturbed and the views between Block A and the Wynnum Memorial Park have been diminished by the addition of buildings and landscape elements. By 1976, No 1 and No 2 buildings were sited over the north extent of the Memorial Avenue and a site plan for Wynnum SHS from 1998 showed a demountable and a multi-purpose shelter over that area. In 2018, a single storey toilet block (Block C), a single-storey office building (Block J), and a two-storey multi-purpose building (Block M) disturb the north extent of the Memorial Avenue. Views between Block A and the Memorial Park are diminished by the location, size and form of Blocks C, I, J and M and mature trees.

In 2018, the school continues to operate from its original site. It retains its suburban brick school building, set in landscaped grounds with a Memorial Avenue, sporting facilities, assembly and playing areas, and mature shade trees. Wynnum SHS is important to the Wynnum-Manly district as a key social focus for the community, as generations of students have been taught there and many social events held in the school's grounds and buildings since its establishment.

== Description ==
Wynnum State High School occupies a large 3.74-hectare (9.2-acre) site in Wynnum; a suburb approximately 15 kilometres (9.3 mi) east of Brisbane CBD. Originally facing Wynnum Memorial Park to the north-west, the site is bounded on other sides by a railway line (northeast), Peel Street (southeast) and Buderim Street (southwest). Primary access to the site is from Peel Street via a tree-lined Memorial Avenue (1919), which runs north through the centre of the site, past a playing field and to a suburban brick school building (Block A, 1943). Block A, the oldest and most notable building within the school complex, faces north-west away from Peel Street and to Wynnum Memorial Park (although this visual connection is now somewhat obscured by later buildings). The grounds are well-established and include a former parade ground (c. 1953) and mature trees. Timber honour boards dating to the school's opening year (1943) are featured in Block A.

=== Suburban brick school building (Block A) ===
Block A is a highly-intact, long, narrow, masonry teaching building of two storeys, with an understorey. It is approximately rectangular in plan, with its long sides facing northwest (front) and southeast (rear), and has a terracotta tiled hip roof. A projecting portico in the centre of the front elevation frames the main entrance, and reinforces the symmetrical and balanced aesthetic of the building. The building is accessed via a central concrete stair with heavy stucco balustrades.

The building is elegantly composed with classical detailing. Constructed from load-bearing brick walls, it has stucco decorative elements to the first and second floors, and stucco walls and piers to the understorey scored to resemble ashlar coursing. The face brick walls of the first and second floors are relieved by darker face brick pilasters and stucco lintels, sills, string courses, and pilaster capitals and bases.

The stucco portico has a pediment supported by tall square pillars and giant-order Ionic columns. Raised lettering on the entablature reads "WYNNUM HIGH AND INTERMEDIATE SCHOOL" and the pediment features heavy stucco accents and dentil detailing. The front and rear elevations have regularly spaced banks of windows, separated into bays by pilasters. Two stairwell bays project from the rear elevation and have large pediments with stucco details.

The interior layout is generally repeated on the first and second floors, with access between the three levels provided by a stairwell toward either end of the building. Primary circulation from these stairs and through the upper two floors is via a long corridor that runs along the northwest side of the building. Originally enclosed at the northeast end (for first floor domestic science storage rooms, and a second floor balance room), the corridors now extend the full length of the building, with the former enclosures generally identifiable through bulkheads and wall nibs. The northeast end wall of the corridor has also been cut through to allow access to a recent elevator. With the exception of the front entrance bay (containing a first floor foyer with flanking administration spaces, and a second floor classroom and teachers room), the classrooms and stairwells are on the southeast side of the corridor. A first floor classroom has a raised floor (designed for use as a stage) and is accessed via a separate small concrete stair with timber and metal balustrade, adjacent the southwest stairwell. Most classrooms and offices have timber-framed floors and the corridors have concrete floors.

The understorey retains its long, enclosed classroom (former workshop) and adjacent store room at the northeast end of the building. The open play areas in the centre and at the southwest end have been enclosed for classrooms and stores. Most toilets (formerly adjacent to stairwells) have been removed, reconfigured or replaced with offices divided by recent lightweight partitions. The floors are concrete.

=== Grounds and landscape features ===
The school grounds are well established with a variety of mature trees. Of particular prominence is the Memorial Avenue (1919), consisting of mature hoop pines (Araucaria cunninghamii) to either side of an entrance drive. The Memorial Avenue runs from Peel Street into the school allotment. It has been shortened from its original configuration (the avenue formerly extended into the northeast side of the Memorial Park) and is now partially obscured by recent school buildings. Some mature trees survive disconnected from the original avenue (in Lot 378 RP226441 and in the adjacent park).

Other mature shade trees on the site include a fig tree (Ficus sp.) to the west of Block A, and a weeping fig (Ficus Benjamina), pine tree (Pinus sp.) and camphor laurel (Cinnamomum camphora) to the north of the Music and Science Block (Block I).

The former Parade Ground (c. 1953) on the southeast side of Block A allows important views to be obtained of the building. It is an open space, defined by its bitumen surface, and has a low stone retaining wall (1955) along its southeast edge.

Views to, from, and between Block A, the Memorial Park and Buderim Street are of importance to the school's prominence, planning and setting. As at 2018, most of these views are obscured by recent school buildings, but a small view corridor west of Block A (to / from the Memorial Park and Buderim Street) has been retained.

== Heritage listing ==
Wynnum State High School was listed on the Queensland Heritage Register on 28 June 2018 having satisfied the following criteria.

The place is important in demonstrating the evolution or pattern of Queensland's history.

Wynnum State High School (established 1942 as Wynnum State High and Intermediate School) is important in demonstrating the evolution of state education and its associated architecture in Queensland. The place retains an excellent example of a government designed suburban brick school building (1943), which was an architectural response to prevailing government educational philosophies; set in landscaped grounds with the provision of assembly and play areas, sporting facilities and mature trees.

The World War I (WWI) Memorial Avenue (1919) is important in demonstrating the community's involvement in a major world event. War memorials are a tribute from the community to those who served, and those who died. They are an important element of Queensland's towns and cities and are also important in demonstrating a common pattern of commemoration across Queensland and Australia.

The place is important in demonstrating the principal characteristics of a particular class of cultural places.

Wynnum State High School is important in demonstrating the principal characteristics of a Queensland state school. The school comprises a suburban brick school building constructed to a government design. This element is set within a generous, landscaped site that retains mature trees, assembly and sporting facilities including a playing field.

The substantial suburban brick school building is a good, intact example of its type and retains a high degree of integrity. The building demonstrates the principal characteristics of its type, including: its two- storey form, with an understorey; symmetrical, high-quality design that features classical detailing; loadbearing face brick construction; and hipped roof. The building has a linear layout, with rooms accessed by corridors; banks of south-facing windows in classrooms, providing light and ventilation; and an understorey formerly used as an open play space. Typical of this building type, the suburban brick school building was located in a growing suburban area at the time of its construction.

The place is important because of its aesthetic significance.

Through its elegant external and internal composition of formal and decorative elements, substantial size, face brick exterior and high quality materials, early timber joinery and decorative metal work, the intact suburban brick school building at Wynnum State High School has aesthetic significance due to its expressive attributes, by which the Department of Public Works (DPW) sought to convey the concepts of progress and permanence.

The building's classically-influenced symmetrical design and impressive portico featuring giant-order columns contribute to its beautiful attributes. Standing in an open setting overlooking Wynnum Memorial Park and framed by mature trees, it is an attractive feature of the area. Views to and from the building are an important aspect of its aesthetic significance.

The WWI Memorial Avenue of hoop pine trees (Araucaria cunninghamii), running from Peel Street through the grounds of Wynnum State High School to the Wynnum Memorial Park, is a landmark in the streetscapes of Peranga, Peel and Buderim Streets and visible from high ground in the vicinity.

The place has a strong or special association with a particular community or cultural group for social, cultural or spiritual reasons.

Schools have always played an important part in Queensland communities. They typically retain significant and enduring connections with former pupils, parents, and teachers; provide a venue for social interaction and volunteer work; and are a source of pride, symbolising local progress and aspirations.

Wynnum State High School has a strong and ongoing association with its large surrounding district. Established in 1942, generations of pupils have been taught there. The place is important for its contribution to the educational development of the community and is a prominent community focal point and gathering place for social and commemorative events with widespread community support.

The Memorial Avenue is endured by the community as a memorial since 1919 to those from the district who served in WWI.
