= Wynnum North railway station =

Railway station in Queensland, Australia

Wynnum North
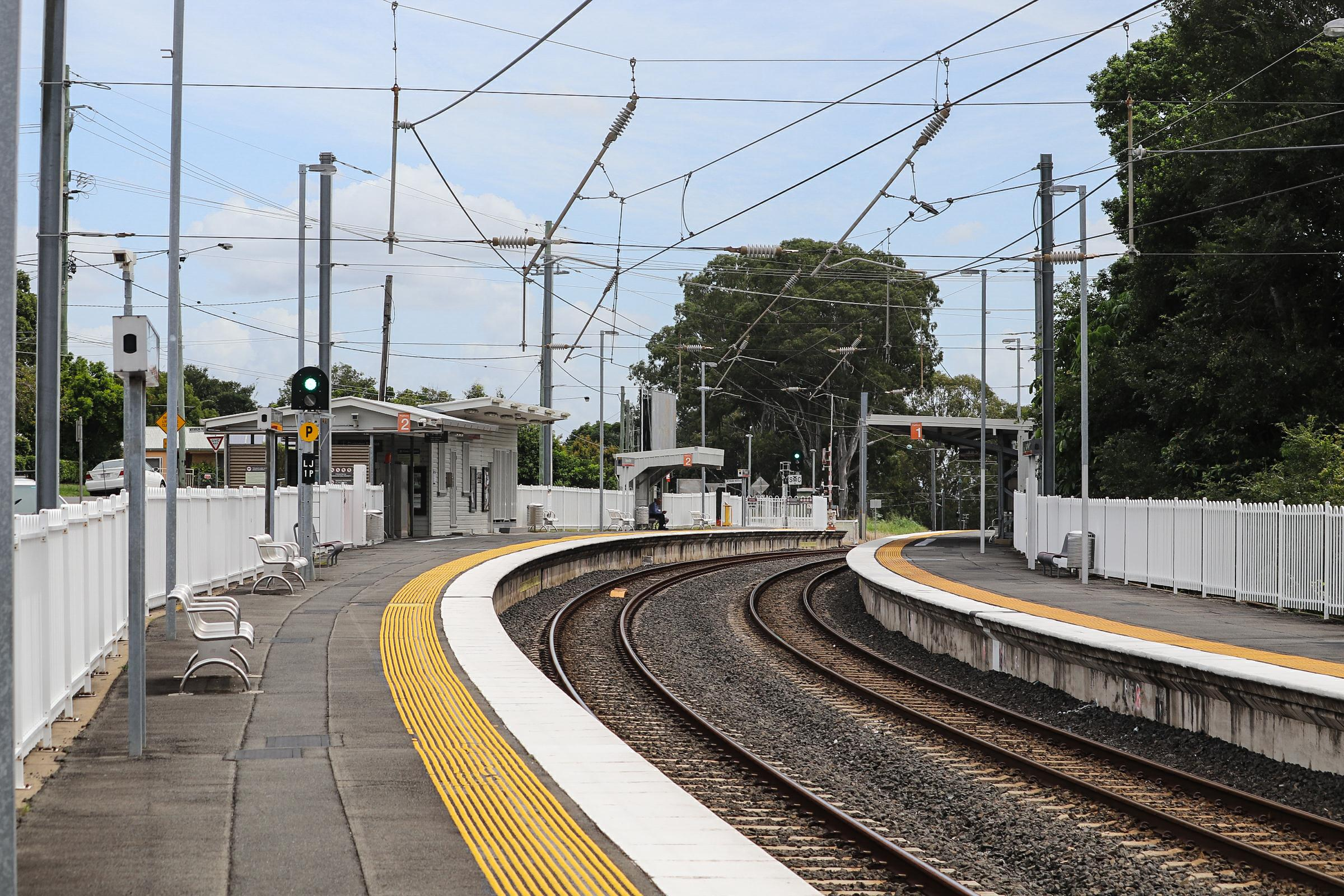
- Westbound view from Platform 1, March 2018

General information
- Location: Cameron Parade, Wynnum
- Coordinates: 27°26′14″S 153°09′31″E
- Owner: Queensland Rail
- Operator: Queensland Rail
- Line: T4 Cleveland
- Distance: 20.83 kilometres from Central
- Platforms: 2 side
- Tracks: 2

Construction
- Structure type: Ground
- Parking: 32 bays
- Cycle facilities: Yes
- Accessible: Yes

Other information
- Station code: 600265 (platform 1); 600264 (platform 2)
- Fare zone: Zone 2
- Website: Translink

Services
Preceding station	Queensland Rail	Following station
Lindum towards Shorncliffe via Roma Street	T4 Cleveland line	Wynnum towards Cleveland
Location

Wynnum North is a railway station operated by Queensland Rail on the Cleveland line. It opened in 1889 and serves the Brisbane suburb of Wynnum. It is a ground level station, featuring two side platforms.

== Services ==
Wynnum North is served by Cleveland line services from Shorncliffe, Northgate, Doomben and Bowen Hills to Manly & Cleveland.

== Platforms and services ==
Wynnum North platform arrangement
Platform	Line	Destination	Notes
1	T4 Cleveland	Cleveland	
2	T4 Cleveland	Roma Street (to Shorncliffe line)	
