= Waterloo Bay Hotel =

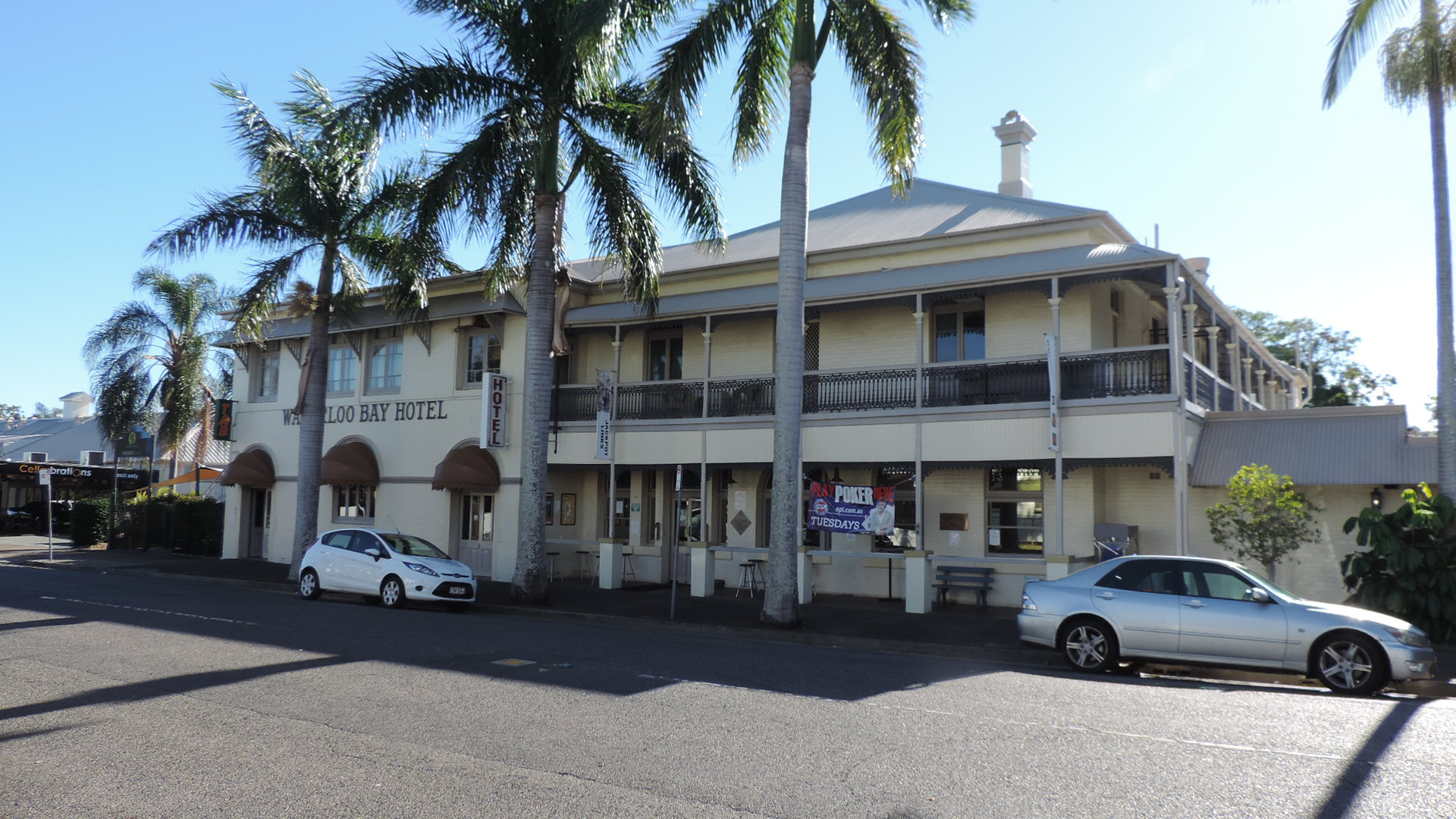
- Waterloo Bay Hotel, 2014

- Location within Queensland Location within Australia
- 27.4419°S 153.1709°E
- Location: 75 Berrima Street, Wynnum, City of Brisbane, Queensland, Australia

History
- Design period: 1870s–1890s (late 19th century)
- Built: 1889, extended 1918

Site notes
- Architect: George Henry Male Addison

Queensland Heritage Register
- Official name: Waterloo Bay Hotel
- Type: state heritage (built)
- Designated: 28 July 2000
- Reference no.: 601729
- Significant period: 1880s, 1910s (fabric); 1889–ongoing (historical use)
- Significant components: lead light/s, tree
- Builders: George Gibbs

Waterloo Bay Hotel is a heritage-listed hotel at 75 Berrima Street, Wynnum, City of Brisbane, Queensland, Australia. It was built in 1889 by George Gibbs and extended in 1918 to a design by George Henry Male Addison. It was added to the Queensland Heritage Register on 28 July 2000.

== History ==
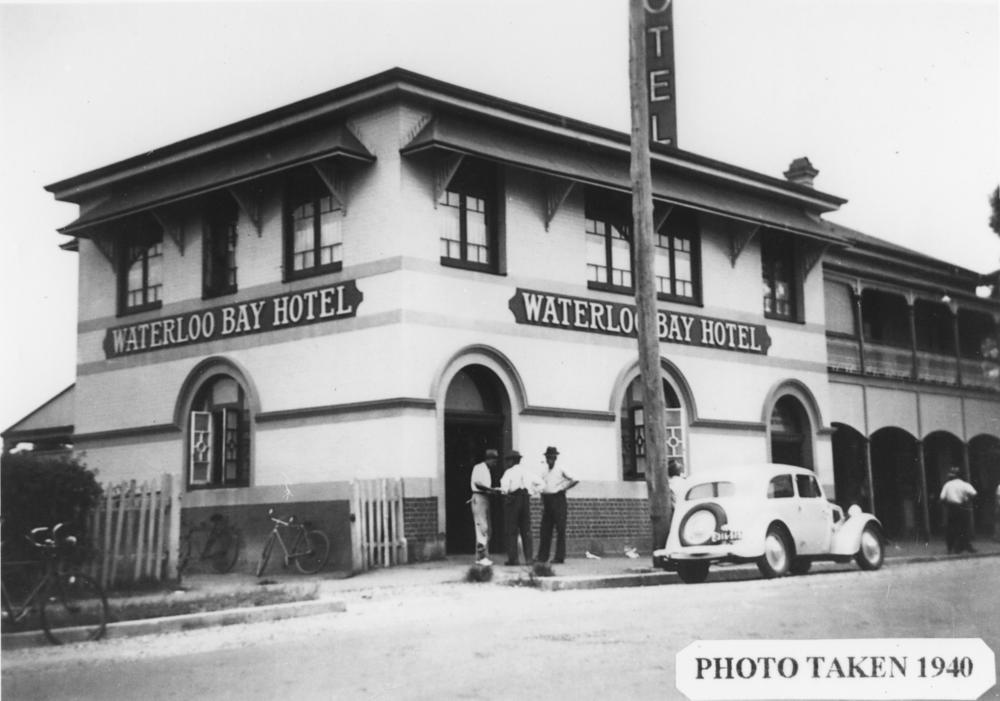
Waterloo Bay Hotel in the Brisbane suburb of Wynnum, 1940

The original section of the Waterloo Bay Hotel was constructed in 1889 by George Gibbs. The hotel was extended in 1918, when work was undertaken by Brisbane architect, GHM Addison. Major refurbishments were also undertaken in the 1980s and in the late 1990s.

The bayside suburbs of Wynnum and Manly were known as Oyster Point and Wyvernleigh, after the first house in the area. The first land sales in the area took place in 1860 at Lytton and around the Waterloo Bay. In 1882, Manly Beach Estate was auctioned. Wynnum and Manly were the only bayside stations opened with the Cleveland railway line on 1 November 1889. The completion of the railway led to a surge of growth in the district, and by the early years of the 20th century, it had become a popular seaside resort town, with many people travelling from Brisbane by train on the weekend. Wynnum had a siding, loading bank and goods shed by 1891 and it was the terminus for extra Sunday trains from 1889 and weekday services from 1 March 1892.

The Waterloo Bay Hotel was constructed by George Gibbs, a local stonemason, in 1889. Gibbs was born in Cornwall and sailed for Australia on board the Fiery Star in 1863 with his wife and infant. After the birth of his second child and the death of his first, the Gibbs' returned to Cornwall. Two more children were born then his first wife died. In 1875, with a new wife and four children, Gibbs again left Cornwall for Australia on board the Great Queensland, landing at Maryborough and later residing in Gibbs Street, Kelvin Grove. Gibbs purchased land in Mary (later Berrima) Street in May 1889, and commenced construction of a hotel. He applied for, and was granted, a licence through the South Brisbane Licensing Courts. The Brisbane Courier reported on 7 November that "...the house was complete and ready for occupation." The Waterloo Bay Hotel opened for business on 6 November 1889 - just five days after the opening of the Cleveland railway line.

Gibbs owned the hotel until 1892 when, due to ill health, it was sold and the family moved to Gibbs Street, Wynnum. The hotel was sold to Sarah Jane King in March 1892. Title passed to William Morris in 1895 and later to Helen Rankin Turner from August 1896.

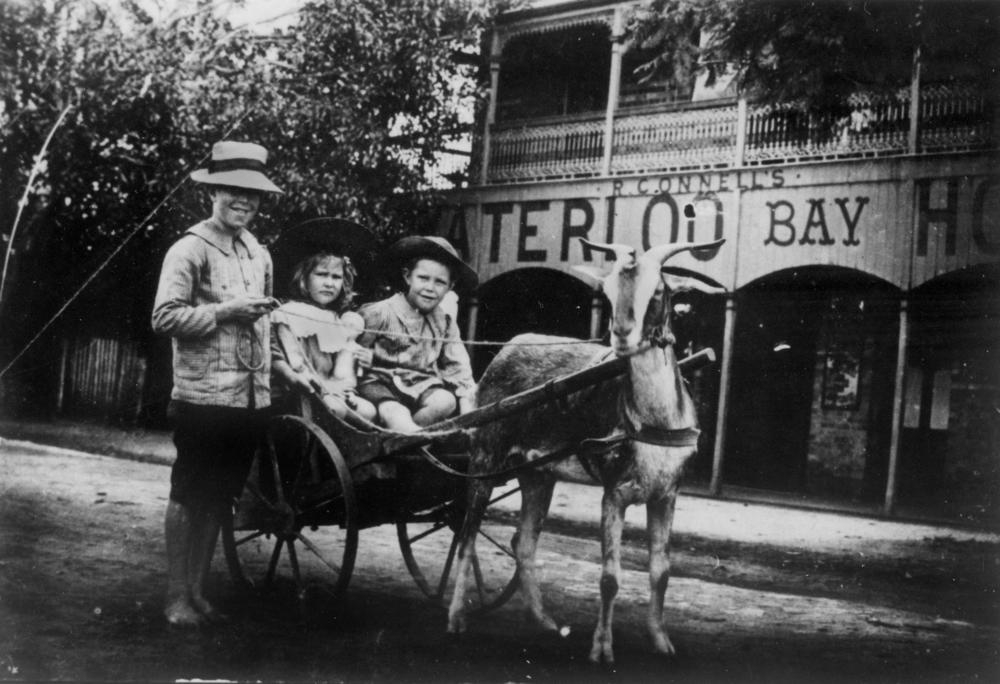
Children with a goat outside the Waterloo hotel, c. 1915

The hotel was purchased by William Denis O'Connor in August 1898. He remained the owner until he died on 14 January 1950. O'Connor was the licensee from the date of purchase until October 1901 when he leased the building to Bernard Kennedy for ten years. In August 1907, Kennedy transferred the balance of the lease to Augustus Marshall who held it til May 1908.

Sarah Baird took up the lease of the hotel in May 1908. Initially, her husband, Robert, was the licensee, however, following his death in June 1910, Sarah took over as licensee. In January 1911, Baird made an application to the Licensing Court to have music at the hotel every Saturday. A new application had to be made every week. The South Brisbane Licence Register indicates that the Waterloo Bay Hotel was one of the first hotels on the south side of the river to have music each week. In October 1911, Amelia Connell took out a new lease, with her husband Robert as the licensee. By the end of that year music had ceased playing at the hotel. On 7 March 1918, the ten-year lease was surrendered subsequent to the death of Amelia Connell on 19 October 1917. In February 1918, the Government Gazette advertised a Transmission by Death of Interest in Lease from Amelia Connell to Patrick Joseph O'Shea, and a Surrender of Lease from Patrick O'Shea to William Denis O'Connor. By February, 1918, O'Connor had commissioned architect, GHM Addison to undertake alterations to the hotel. The alterations included the construction of a new public bar on the ground floor and private accommodation on the first floor.

O'Connor's death was registered on 14 January 1950, at this time, the entire property passed to Douglas Wadley and Graham O'Connor as Trustees. In September 1956, the lease for hotel passed to Queensland Brewery Ltd. This lease was held until 1985 when it was transferred to Ashwick (Qld). The property passed to Moreton Bay Holdings in early 1987.

In November 1989, a week-long celebration to commemorate the 100th anniversary of the hotel was organised by the then lessees. An article in the Bayside Bulletin dated 14 November 1989 states that "...the Waterloo Bay Hotel is serving the community as never before and looks set to take on its second hundred years with ease and equanimity." Renovations undertaken in the 1980s, included the addition of a beer garden and restaurant. Towards the end of 1999, further renovation work was undertaken.

Still a focal point for the local and surrounding community, the Waterloo Bay Hotel has been identified as a Heritage Place within the Wynnum-Manly Local Area Plan.

== Description ==
The Waterloo Bay Hotel is located on a triangular piece of land at Wynnum, bounded by Berrima Street and Bay and Byrnside Terraces. A mature Moreton Bay fig tree is located in the eastern corner of the property.

The original section (1889) of the hotel is a two-storeyed masonry building with a hipped roof clad with corrugated iron. Two rendered chimneys with moulded detailing are located in the roof. The building has a ground floor verandah and first floor balcony with iron balustrading and chamfered timber posts and brackets. The timber posts on the ground floor have a recent concrete base. Paired timber doors with breezeway and fanlight assembly with leadlight detail are located in the entrance to the lounge bar area.

Internally, on the ground floor, the ceiling in the lounge bar area has plaster cornices with egg and dart motif decorative detail. An entrance in the eastern side of the original section leads to the beer garden area, which was added to the building in the 1980s. A doorway in what was the eastern wall of the original section leads to a passageway and an original turning timber staircase with decorative motifs on the newel. Four rooms open to the first floor balcony on the western side of the building. The rooms have double hung sash windows with timber architraves. The ceilings are pressed metal. Each room also has timber French doors opening to the balcony. Two austere rooms with timber French doors opening to the balcony are located in the centre of the floor. On the southern side of the timber staircase, more accommodation space is located and is currently occupied. Three sets of timber French doors open to the balcony from this area. A passage runs north south along the first floor, turning and leading to the 1918 extension. An entrance to the later extension has been closed over. A large window with timber architraves and frosted, decorative glass is located at the end of the southern wall. Toilet facilities with fittings c. 1950s, are located on the western side of the first floor.

The later extension (1918) is two-storeyed rendered brick with a hipped roof clad with corrugated iron. Internally, the bar is located along the eastern wall. A large window with timber architraves, and frosted glass featuring a lighthouse design, is located along the northern wall. The bar area is open plan with original plaster ceilings with decorative cornices. Toilet facilities are located in the western corner. The bar area opens to the gaming room, a 1960s addition to the hotel. The first floor of the 1918 extension is currently used for accommodation.

== Heritage listing ==
Waterloo Bay Hotel was listed on the Queensland Heritage Register on 28 July 2000 having satisfied the following criteria.

The place is important in demonstrating the evolution or pattern of Queensland's history.

Constructed in 1889, with a number of later extensions, the Waterloo Bay Hotel is most significant in demonstrating the evolution of Queensland's history, being closely associated with the establishment of the railway to Wynnum and the subsequent evolution of Wynnum as a popular seaside resort in the second half of the 19th and early 20th centuries. The Cleveland-Wynnum line was one of the railway lines constructed specifically for recreational purposes and is important in understanding the development of the railway in Queensland. With the opening up of the Cleveland-Wynnum area, an increase in the number of day trippers and holiday makers was possible, thus enabling the Waterloo Bay Hotel to capitalise on such a population increase. Further, the Waterloo Bay Hotel is significant as an example of a hotel that has functioned as such for over a century and is one of the few remaining buildings in Wynnum associated with the opening of the railway line.

The place is important in demonstrating the principal characteristics of a particular class of cultural places.

Built in a similar style to the Grandview Hotel at Cleveland, the Waterloo Bay Hotel is significant as a good example of a prominent, two-storeyed masonry hotel with substantial ground floor verandah and first floor balcony with timber posts and cast iron balusters and brackets.

The place is important because of its aesthetic significance.

Forming an integral part of the Wynnum townscape for over 110 years, the Waterloo Bay Hotel is a well-known landmark in the area.

The place has a strong or special association with a particular community or cultural group for social, cultural or spiritual reasons.

It has played a major role in social activities of the Wynnum community throughout this period of time.

The place has a special association with the life or work of a particular person, group or organisation of importance in Queensland's history.

The Waterloo Bay Hotel is significant for its association with George Gibbs, a local stonemason who constructed the hotel, later retiring and remaining in the Wynnum area. Gibbs Street, Wynnum is named for George Gibbs. The 1918 extension is associated with the work of well known Brisbane architect GHM Addison. Addison is known for such work as the Old Museum Building, Cumbooquepa (Somerville House) and The Mansions.
