= Wynnum Central railway station =

Railway station in Queensland, Australia

Wynnum Central
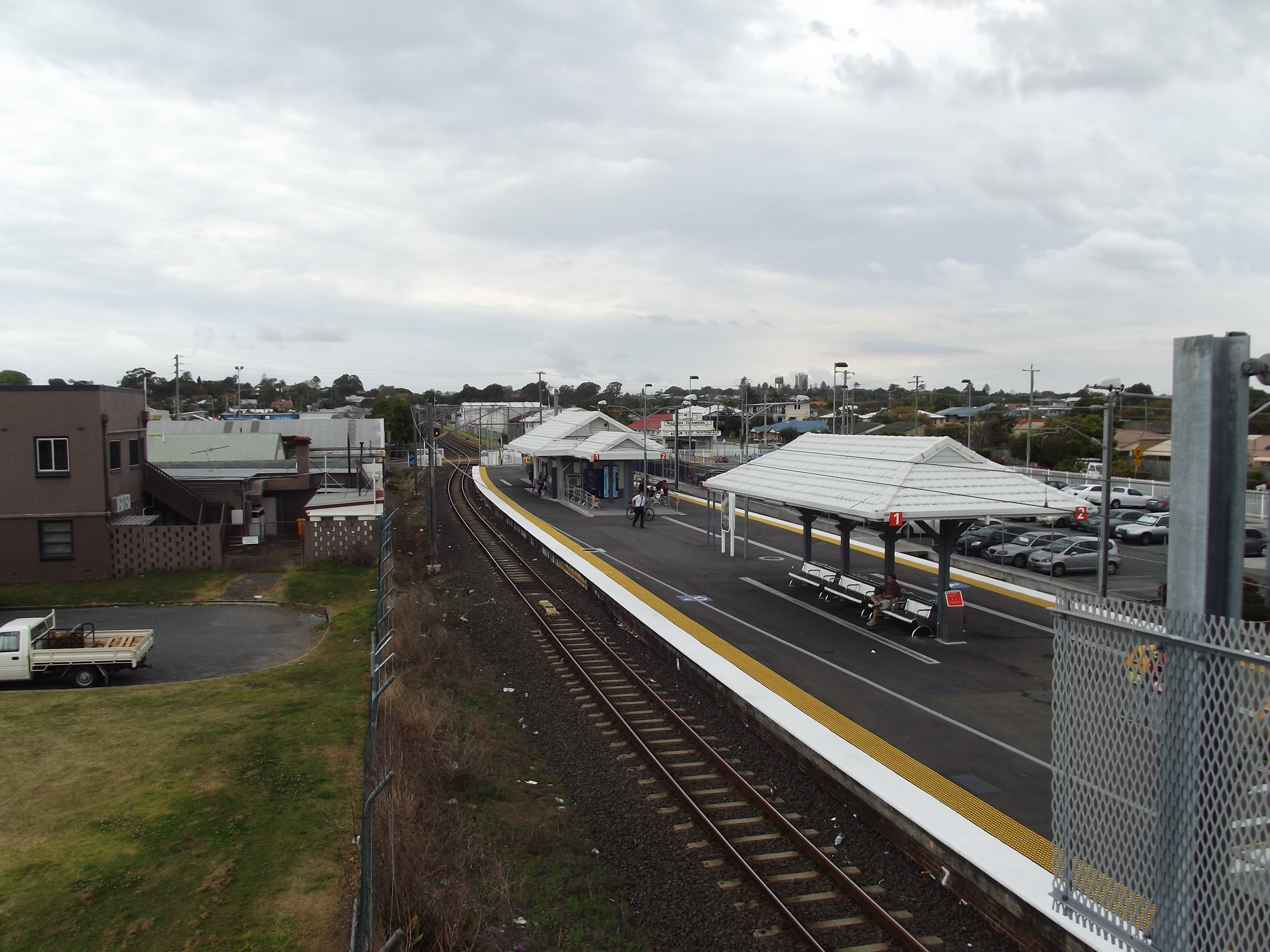
- Westbound view of Platform 1, August 2012

General information
- Location: Ronald Street, Wynnum
- Coordinates: 27°26′43″S 153°10′13″E
- Owner: Queensland Rail
- Operator: Queensland Rail
- Line: T4 Cleveland
- Distance: 22.44 kilometres from Central
- Platforms: 2 (1 island)
- Tracks: 2

Construction
- Structure type: Ground
- Parking: 117 bays
- Cycle facilities: Yes
- Accessible: Assisted (rail crossing)

Other information
- Station code: 600628 (platform 1); 600629 (platform 2)
- Fare zone: Zone 2
- Website: Translink

History
- Opened: 1898
- Former names: Wynnum South

Services
Preceding station	Queensland Rail	Following station
Wynnum towards Shorncliffe via Roma Street	T4 Cleveland line	Manly towards Cleveland
Location

Wynnum Central is a railway station operated by Queensland Rail on the Cleveland line. It opened in 1889 and serves the Brisbane suburb of Wynnum. It is a ground level station, featuring one island platform with two faces.

== History ==
Wynnum Central was originally just a stopping place at the level crossing called Craig's Crossing beginning in April 1898. Later that year was a station was opened named Wynnum South.

It was renamed Wynnum Central in 1932 after a proposal by the Wynnum-Manly-Lota Chamber of Commerce in 1931.

== Services ==
Wynnum Central is served by Cleveland line services from Shorncliffe, Northgate, Doomben and Bowen Hills to Manly & Cleveland.

== Platforms and services ==
Wynnum Central platform arrangement
Platform	Line	Destination	Notes
1	T4 Cleveland	Cleveland	
2	T4 Cleveland	Roma Street (to Shorncliffe line)	
