= 2004 Brisbane City Council election =

Australian local elections

- 27 March 2004

26 wards in the Brisbane City Council
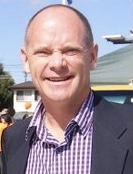

	First party	Second party
Leader	Campbell Newman	Tim Quinn
Party	Liberal	Labor
Leader since	2004
Last election	8 wards	18 wards
Seats won	9 wards	17 wards
Seat change	▲1	▼1
Popular vote	246,563	212,265
Percentage	47.13%	40.57%
TPP	52.50%	47.50%
Lord Mayor of Brisbane before election
Tim Quinn
Labor
Subsequent Lord Mayor
Campbell Newman
Liberal

The 2004 Brisbane City Council election was held on 27 March 2004 to elect a lord mayor and 26 councillors to the City of Brisbane. The election was held as part of the statewide local government elections in Queensland, Australia.

The election resulted in the election of Campbell Newman of the Liberal Party as Lord Mayor, defeating the Labor Party incumbent, Tim Quinn, by 2.5% of the mayoral two-party-preferred vote. The Liberals won 9 wards to Labor's 17. Newman became the first Liberal Lord Mayor since Sallyanne Atkinson's narrow defeat in 1991.

== Results ==
=== Summary ===
==== Mayoral election ====
2004 Brisbane City Council election: Mayor
Party	Candidate	Votes	%	±%
Liberal	Campbell Newman	246,563	47.13	
Labor	Tim Quinn	212,265	40.57	
Greens	Drew Hutton	52,995	10.13	
Independent	Russell Hall	5,815	1.11	
Independent	Derek M Rosborough	3,464	0.66	
Independent	Nick Kapsis	2,100	0.40	
Total formal votes		523,202	98.05	
Informal votes		10,387	1.95	
Turnout		533,589	86.36	
Two-party-preferred result
Liberal	Campbell Newman	255,586	52.50	
Labor	Tim Quinn	231,288	47.50	
Liberal gain from Labor		Swing		

==== Wards ====
2004 Brisbane City Council election: Wards
Party	Votes	%	±%	Seats	Change
Liberal	243,917	47.02		9	▲1
Labor	222,215	42.83		17	▼1
Greens	42,243	8.14		0	Steady
Independent	10,406	2.01		0	Steady
Total formal votes	518,781	97.91			
Informal votes	11,084	2.09			
Turnout	529,865	85.76			
Two-party-preferred result
Liberal	251,547	51.55			
Labor	236,396	48.45			

==== Constituencies changing hands ====
Constituency	Pre-election			Swing	Post-election		
Constituency	Party	Member	Margin	Swing	Margin	Member	Party
Lord Mayor	Labor	Tim Quinn			2.50	Campbell Newman	Liberal
McDowall	Labor	Rita Collins			4.05	Norm Wyndham	Liberal

==== Councillors ====
Ward	Party	Councillor	Margin (%)
Acacia Ridge	Labor	Kevin Bianchi	3.81
Bracken Ridge	Liberal	Carol Cashman	19.19
Central	Labor	David Hinchliffe	12.04
Chandler	Liberal	Michael Caltabiano	17.94
Deagon	Labor	Victoria Newton	10.98
Doboy	Labor	John Campbell	4.97
Dutton Park	Labor	Helen Abrahams	9.70
East Brisbane	Labor	Catherine Bermingham	1.06
Enoggera	Labor	Ann Bennison	9.48
Grange	Labor	Maureen Hayes	5.13
Hamilton	Liberal	Tim Nicholls	16.32
Holland Park	Labor	Kerry Rea	5.58
Jamboree	Labor	Felicity Farmer	6.55
Marchant	Labor	Faith Hopkins	3.79
McDowall	Liberal	Norm Wyndham	4.05
Moorooka	Labor	Steve Griffiths	6.60
Morningside	Labor	Shayne Sutton	4.18
Northgate	Labor	Kim Flesser	5.88
Pullenvale	Liberal	Margaret de Wit	28.99
Richlands	Labor	Les Bryant	15.82
Runcorn	Labor	Gail MacPherson	2.19
The Gap	Liberal	Geraldine Knapp	16.99
Toowong	Liberal	Judy Magub	12.71
Walter Taylor	Liberal	Jane Prentice	18.87
Wishart	Liberal	Graham Quirk	15.64
Wynnum Manly	Labor	Peter Cumming	5.79

==== Post-election pendulum ====
Labor wards (17)
Marginal
East Brisbane	Catherine Bermingham	ALP	1.06%
Runcorn	Gail MacPherson	ALP	2.19%
Marchant	Faith Hopkins	ALP	3.79%
Acacia Ridge	Kevin Bianchi	ALP	3.81%
Morningside	Shayne Sutton	ALP	4.18%
Doboy	John Campbell	ALP	4.97%
Fairly safe
Grange	Maureen Hayes	ALP	5.13%
Holland Park	Kerry Rea	ALP	5.58%
Wynnum Manly	Peter Cumming	ALP	5.79%
Northgate	Kim Flesser	ALP	5.88%
Jamboree	Felicity Farmer	ALP	6.55%
Moorooka	Steve Griffiths	ALP	6.60%
Enoggera	Ann Bennison	ALP	9.48%
Dutton Park	Helen Abrahams	ALP	9.70%
Safe
Deagon	Victoria Newton	ALP	10.98%
Central	David Hinchliffe	ALP	12.04%
Very safe
Richlands	Les Bryant	ALP	15.82%
Liberal wards (9)
Marginal
McDowall	Norm Wyndham	LIB	4.05%
Safe
Toowong	Judy Magub	LIB	12.71%
Very safe
Wishart	Graham Quirk	LIB	15.64%
Hamilton	Tim Nicholls	LIB	16.32%
The Gap	Geraldine Knapp	LIB	16.99%
Chandler	Michael Caltabiano	LIB	17.94%
Walter Taylor	Jane Prentice	LIB	18.87%
Bracken Ridge	Carol Cashman	LIB	19.19%
Pullenvale	Margaret de Wit	LIB	28.99%

=== Ward results ===
==== Acacia Ridge ====
2004 Brisbane City Council election: Acacia Ridge Ward
Party	Candidate	Votes	%	±%
Labor	Kevin Bianchi	11,935	53.81	
Liberal	Angela Owen-Taylor	10,246	46.19	
Total formal votes		22,181	97.20	
Informal votes		640	2.80	
Turnout		22,821	87.75	
Two-party-preferred result
Labor	Kevin Bianchi	11,935	53.81	
Liberal	Angela Owen-Taylor	10,246	46.19	
Labor hold		Swing		

==== Bracken Ridge ====
2004 Brisbane City Council election: Bracken Ridge Ward
Party	Candidate	Votes	%	±%
Liberal	Carol Cashman	14,103	65.45	
Labor	Steve Davey	6,137	28.48	
Greens	Mark Carey-Smith	1,308	6.07	
Total formal votes		21,548	98.07	
Informal votes		423	1.93	
Turnout		21,971	89.25	
Two-party-preferred result
Liberal	Carol Cashman	14,274	69.19	
Labor	Steve Davey	6,356	30.81	
Liberal hold		Swing		

==== Central ====
2004 Brisbane City Council election: Central Ward
Party	Candidate	Votes	%	±%
Labor	David Hinchliffe	9,198	47.75	
Liberal	Rodney Maller	6,052	31.42	
Greens	Colin Sweett	3,378	17.54	
Independent	Coral Wynter	634	3.29	
Total formal votes		19,262	98.16	
Informal votes		362	1.84	
Turnout		19,624	75.11	
Two-party-preferred result
Labor	David Hinchliffe	10,434	62.04	
Liberal	Rodney Maller	6,383	37.96	
Labor hold		Swing		

==== Chandler ====
2004 Brisbane City Council election: Chandler Ward
Party	Candidate	Votes	%	±%
Liberal	Michael Caltabiano	14,291	67.94	
Labor	Chris Forrester	6,745	32.06	
Total formal votes		21,036	97.80	
Informal votes		473	2.20	
Turnout		21,509	88.52	
Two-party-preferred result
Liberal	Michael Caltabiano	14,291	67.94	
Labor	Chris Forrester	6,745	32.06	
Liberal hold		Swing		

==== Deagon ====
2004 Brisbane City Council election: Deagon Ward
Party	Candidate	Votes	%	±%
Labor	Victoria Newton	10,156	53.02	
Liberal	Zenia Belcher	6,549	34.19	
Greens	Peter Leonard Fagan	2,451	12.79	
Total formal votes		19,156	97.80	
Informal votes		431	2.20	
Turnout		19,587	87.56	
Two-party-preferred result
Labor	Victoria Newton	10,678	60.98	
Liberal	Zenia Belcher	6,832	39.02	
Labor hold		Swing		

==== Doboy ====
2004 Brisbane City Council election: Doboy Ward
Party	Candidate	Votes	%	±%
Labor	John Campbell	10,144	50.28	
Liberal	Steve Hill	8,222	40.75	
Independent	Peter Lovegrove	1,811	8.98	
Total formal votes		20,177	97.41	
Informal votes		537	2.59	
Turnout		20,714	88.33	
Two-party-preferred result
Labor	John Campbell	10,388	54.97	
Liberal	Steve Hill	8,511	45.03	
Labor hold		Swing		

==== Dutton Park ====
2004 Brisbane City Council election: Dutton Park Ward
Party	Candidate	Votes	%	±%
Labor	Helen J Abrahams	7,844	40.97	
Liberal	Darrin Treanor	5,613	29.32	
Greens	Ben Pennings	4,801	25.08	
Independent	Murray Swan	886	4.63	
Total formal votes		19,144	97.82	
Informal votes		427	2.18	
Turnout		19,571	81.29	
Two-party-preferred result
Labor	Helen J Abrahams	9,697	59.70	
Liberal	Darrin Treanor	6,547	40.30	
Labor hold		Swing		

==== East Brisbane ====
2004 Brisbane City Council election: East Brisbane Ward
Party	Candidate	Votes	%	±%
Labor	Catherine Bermingham	10,180	51.06	
Liberal	Adrian Schrinner	9,756	48.94	
Total formal votes		19,936	97.49	
Informal votes		513	2.51	
Turnout		20,449	80.34	
Two-party-preferred result
Labor	Catherine Bermingham	10,180	51.06	
Liberal	Adrian Schrinner	9,756	48.94	
Labor hold		Swing		

==== Enoggera ====
2004 Brisbane City Council election: Enoggera Ward
Party	Candidate	Votes	%	±%
Labor	Ann Bennison	9,971	51.57	
Liberal	Colin Farquhar	6,978	36.09	
Greens	Matthew Harris	2,387	12.34	
Total formal votes		19,336	97.94	
Informal votes		406	2.06	
Turnout		19,742	86.33	
Two-party-preferred result
Labor	Ann Bennison	10,621	59.48	
Liberal	Colin Farquhar	7,236	40.52	
Labor hold		Swing		

==== Grange ====
2004 Brisbane City Council election: Grange Ward
Party	Candidate	Votes	%	±%
Labor	Maureen Hayes	9,021	45.22	
Liberal	Marie Pryce	7,670	38.45	
Greens	Richard Nielsen	3,256	16.32	
Total formal votes		19,947	98.24	
Informal votes		357	1.76	
Turnout		20,304	83.40	
Two-party-preferred result
Labor	Maureen Hayes	9,931	55.13	
Liberal	Marie Pryce	8,084	44.87	
Labor hold		Swing		

==== Hamilton ====
2004 Brisbane City Council election: Hamilton Ward
Party	Candidate	Votes	%	±%
Liberal	Tim Nicholls	11,470	60.18	
Labor	Kerrina King	5,359	28.12	
Greens	Michael Mather	2,230	11.70	
Total formal votes		19,059	98.20	
Informal votes		349	1.80	
Turnout		19,408	83.30	
Two-party-preferred result
Liberal	Tim Nicholls	11,776	66.32	
Labor	Kerrina King	5,980	33.68	
Liberal hold		Swing		

==== Holland Park ====
2004 Brisbane City Council election: Holland Park Ward
Party	Candidate	Votes	%	±%
Labor	Kerry Rea	11,185	55.58	
Liberal	Ian McKenzie	8,939	44.42	
Total formal votes		20,124	97.74	
Informal votes		465	2.26	
Turnout		20,589	87.69	
Two-party-preferred result
Labor	Kerry Rea	11,185	55.58	
Liberal	Ian McKenzie	8,939	44.42	
Labor hold		Swing		

==== Jamboree ====
2004 Brisbane City Council election: Jamboree Ward
Party	Candidate	Votes	%	±%
Labor	Felicity Farmer	10,975	50.54	
Liberal	Lynne Jennings	8,834	40.68	
Greens	Jos Hall	1,905	8.77	
Total formal votes		21,714	98.66	
Informal votes		294	1.34	
Turnout		22,008	88.44	
Two-party-preferred result
Labor	Felicity Farmer	11,818	56.55	
Liberal	Lynne Jennings	9,079	43.45	
Labor hold		Swing		

==== Marchant ====
2004 Brisbane City Council election: Marchant Ward
Party	Candidate	Votes	%	±%
Labor	Faith Hopkins	8,882	46.98	
Liberal	Mary Jolliffe	7,738	40.93	
Greens	Peter Thomas	1,612	8.53	
Independent	Matt Doolan	672	3.55	
Total formal votes		18,904	97.76	
Informal votes		434	2.24	
Turnout		19,338	86.40	
Two-party-preferred result
Labor	Faith Hopkins	9,299	53.79	
Liberal	Mary Jolliffe	7,987	46.21	
Labor hold		Swing		

==== McDowall ====
2004 Brisbane City Council election: McDowall Ward
Party	Candidate	Votes	%	±%
Liberal	Norm Wyndham	8,989	50.06	
Labor	Rita Collins	7,458	41.53	
Greens	Dennis Delalande	1,510	8.41	
Total formal votes		17,957	98.34	
Informal votes		303	1.66	
Turnout		18,260	89.19	
Two-party-preferred result
Liberal	Norm Wyndham	9,190	54.05	
Labor	Rita Collins	7,813	45.95	
Liberal gain from Labor		Swing		

==== Moorooka ====
2004 Brisbane City Council election: Moorooka Ward
Party	Candidate	Votes	%	±%
Labor	Steve Griffiths	10,837	56.60	
Liberal	Julie Sinclair	8,308	43.40	
Total formal votes		19,145	97.28	
Informal votes		536	2.72	
Turnout		19,681	87.45	
Two-party-preferred result
Labor	Steve Griffiths	10,837	56.60	
Liberal	Julie Sinclair	8,308	43.40	
Labor hold		Swing		

==== Morningside ====
2004 Brisbane City Council election: Morningside Ward
Party	Candidate	Votes	%	±%
Labor	Shayne Sutton	8,248	43.10	
Liberal	Maurice Lane	7,366	38.49	
Greens	Rob Wilson	2,405	12.57	
Independent	Simeon Adams	1,116	5.83	
Total formal votes		19,135	97.86	
Informal votes		419	2.14	
Turnout		19,554	84.32	
Two-party-preferred result
Labor	Shayne Sutton	9,215	54.18	
Liberal	Maurice Lane	7,792	45.82	
Labor hold		Swing		

==== Northgate ====
2004 Brisbane City Council election: Northgate Ward
Party	Candidate	Votes	%	±%
Labor	Kim Flesser	9,439	49.12	
Liberal	Kevin Parer	7,537	39.22	
Greens	Sue Meehan	2,241	11.66	
Total formal votes		19,217	98.11	
Informal votes		371	1.89	
Turnout		19,588	86.64	
Two-party-preferred result
Labor	Kim Flesser	9,990	55.88	
Liberal	Kevin Parer	7,887	44.12	
Labor hold		Swing		

==== Pullenvale ====
2004 Brisbane City Council election: Pullenvale Ward
Party	Candidate	Votes	%	±%
Liberal	Margaret de Wit	14,841	72.99	
Labor	Maree Bliss	3,434	16.89	
Greens	Richard Neehouse	2,058	10.12	
Total formal votes		20,333	98.78	
Informal votes		252	1.22	
Turnout		20,585	88.58	
Two-party-preferred result
Liberal	Margaret de Wit	15,239	78.99	
Labor	Maree Bliss	4,053	21.01	
Liberal hold		Swing		

==== Richlands ====
2004 Brisbane City Council election: Richlands Ward
Party	Candidate	Votes	%	±%
Labor	Les Bryant	12,106	57.26	
Liberal	Alastair Smith	5,732	27.11	
Independent	George Pugh	1,743	8.24	
Greens	Nigel David Quinlan	1,560	7.38	
Total formal votes		21,141	96.87	
Informal votes		684	3.13	
Turnout		21,825	86.46	
Two-party-preferred result
Labor	Les Bryant	12,627	65.82	
Liberal	Alastair Smith	6,557	34.18	
Labor hold		Swing		

==== Runcorn ====
2004 Brisbane City Council election: Runcorn Ward
Party	Candidate	Votes	%	±%
Labor	Gail MacPherson	11,755	52.19	
Liberal	Kathryn Jenkins	10,768	47.81	
Total formal votes		22,523	97.35	
Informal votes		614	2.65	
Turnout		23,137	87.10	
Two-party-preferred result
Labor	Gail MacPherson	11,755	52.19	
Liberal	Kathryn Jenkins	10,768	47.81	
Labor hold		Swing		

==== The Gap ====
2004 Brisbane City Council election: The Gap Ward
Party	Candidate	Votes	%	±%
Liberal	Geraldine Knapp	11,305	59.18	
Labor	David Nelson	4,789	25.07	
Greens	Mike Stasse	3,009	15.75	
Total formal votes		19,103	98.69	
Informal votes		253	1.31	
Turnout		19,356	87.01	
Two-party-preferred result
Liberal	Geraldine Knapp	11,760	66.99	
Labor	David Nelson	5,796	33.01	
Liberal hold		Swing		

==== Toowong ====
2004 Brisbane City Council election: Toowong Ward
Party	Candidate	Votes	%	±%
Liberal	Judy Magub	9,913	54.02	
Labor	Martin Bradshaw	4,940	25.07	
Greens	Stuart Skabo	3,499	19.07	
Total formal votes		18,352	98.47	
Informal votes		286	1.53	
Turnout		18,638	79.81	
Two-party-preferred result
Liberal	Judy Magub	10,391	62.71	
Labor	Martin Bradshaw	6,180	37.29	
Liberal hold		Swing		

==== Walter Taylor ====
2004 Brisbane City Council election: Walter Taylor Ward
Party	Candidate	Votes	%	±%
Liberal	Jane Prentice	11,391	61.86	
Labor	David Kerr	4,389	23.84	
Greens	Clive Brazier	2,633	14.30	
Total formal votes		18,413	98.65	
Informal votes		252	1.35	
Turnout		18,665	85.37	
Two-party-preferred result
Liberal	Jane Prentice	11,801	68.87	
Labor	David Kerr	5,335	31.13	
Liberal hold		Swing		

==== Wishart ====
2004 Brisbane City Council election: Wishart Ward
Party	Candidate	Votes	%	±%
Liberal	Graham Quirk	13,684	65.64	
Labor	James Henley	7,163	34.36	
Total formal votes		20,847	97.68	
Informal votes		496	2.32	
Turnout		21,343	86.70	
Two-party-preferred result
Liberal	Graham Quirk	13,684	65.64	
Labor	James Henley	7,163	34.36	
Liberal hold		Swing		

==== Wynnum Manly ====
2004 Brisbane City Council election: Wynnum Manly Ward
Party	Candidate	Votes	%	±%
Labor	Peter Cumming	9,925	47.06	
Liberal	Jeremy Knight	7,622	36.14	
Independent	Paul Brooks	3,544	16.80	
Total formal votes		21,091	97.65	
Informal votes		508	2.35	
Turnout		21,599	88.91	
Two-party-preferred result
Labor	Peter Cumming	10,385	55.79	
Liberal	Jeremy Knight	8,229	44.21	
Labor hold		Swing		
