= Parkinson Ward =

Brisbane City Council ward

Parkinson Ward Queensland — Brisbane City Council
- Created: 2008
- Abolished: 2016
- Namesake: Parkinson
- Electors: 26,846 (2012)
- Demographic: Outer metropolitan

Parkinson Ward was a Brisbane City Council ward covering Parkinson and surrounding suburbs. It was abolished as part of the 2015 redistribution and replaced by Calamvale Ward, this taking effect at the 2016 election.

== History ==
Following a 2007 redistribution, the ward was created to replace Labor-held Acacia Ridge Ward, while gaining area from Richlands Ward and losing area to Runcorn Ward and Moorooka Ward.

Incumbent Acacia Ridge councillor Kevin Bianchi did not contest the election, and Angela Owen-Taylor won it for the Liberal Party with a two-party-preferred swing of almost 10%. She was re-elected in 2012 with a further 10.7% swing.

== Councillors for Parkinson Ward ==
Image	Member	Party	Term	Notes
	Angela Owen	Liberal	15 March 2008 – 26 July 2008	Formerly known as Angela Owen-Taylor. Moved to Calamvale Ward after Parkinson was abolished
	Angela Owen	Liberal National	26 July 2008 – 19 March 2016	Formerly known as Angela Owen-Taylor. Moved to Calamvale Ward after Parkinson was abolished

== Electoral results ==
=== 2012 ===
2012 Queensland local elections: Parkinson Ward
Party	Candidate	Votes	%	±%
Liberal National	Angela Owen-Taylor	14,526	67.06	+15.42
Labor	Rachel Gallagher	7,134	32.94	−6.40
Informal votes		694	3.10	+1.05
Liberal National hold		Swing	+10.79	

=== 2008 ===
2008 Queensland local elections: Parkinson Ward
Party	Candidate	Votes	%	±%
Liberal	Angela Owen-Taylor	10,980	51.64	+4.87
Labor	Linda Paton	8,364	39.34	−13.89
Greens	Robert Scott	1,919	9.03	+9.03
Informal votes		444	2.05	−0.92
Two-party-preferred result
Liberal	Angela Owen-Taylor	11,192	56.27	+9.50
Labor	Linda Paton	8,698	43.73	−9.50
Liberal gain from Labor		Swing	+9.50	
