= East Brisbane Ward =

Former Brisbane City Council ward

East Brisbane Ward Queensland — Brisbane City Council
- Dates current: 1994–2008
- Namesake: East Brisbane

East Brisbane Ward was a Brisbane City Council ward covering East Brisbane and surrounding suburbs. It was abolished as part of the 2007 redistribution – taking effect at the 2008 election – with its area divided into existing Holland Park Ward and newly created The Gabba Ward.

== History ==
The ward was established for the 1994 Brisbane City Council election, taking in parts of the abolished Camp Hill, Ekibin, and The Gabba wards. It included the Coorparoo, East Brisbane, Greenslopes, Kangaroo Point, and Stones Corner, along with the part of Woolloongabba east of the Pacific Motorway.

Ahead of the 1994 election, the incumbent Aldermen for the abolished wards of Ekibin and Fairfield, Kerry Rea and Robyn Twell respectively, nominated for endorsement as the Australian Labor Party's candidate for East Brisbane.. Twell was successful in gaining endorsement by the party, and went on to win the ward at the 1994 council election. It was later revealed that two members involved with running Twell's preselection campaign (Lee Bermingham and Warwick Powell) had committed electoral fraud by falsely enrolling members in order to gain Twell's preselection. Twell was not implicated in said electoral fraud, and claimed she had not heard any allegations until roughly 1996.

In March 1996, Twell again nominated for preselection by the Labor party ahead of the 1997 election, and was endorsed by the party unopposed. However, in November 1996 Twell withdrew her nomination just four months prior to the council election. A subsequent preselection was held by the party the following month, resulting in Catherine Bermingham (the sister of Lee Bermingham) being endorsed by the party. Both her brother and Warwick Powell were later revealed to have committed electoral fraud for the preselection, though Catherine Bermingham denied knowledge or involvement.

Bermingham successfully contested the 1997 election, retaining the ward for Labor. She went on to retain East Brisbane at the 2000 and 2004 elections.

A redistribution ahead of the 2008 election saw East Brisbane Ward abolished. Most of its southern area became part of Holland Park Ward, while the area north of Old Cleveland Road became part of the re-established The Gabba Ward.

At the 2008 election, incumbent Bermingham contested Holland Park Ward for the Labor party, but was ultimately defeated by Ian McKenzie for the Liberal Party.

== Councillors for East Brisbane Ward ==
Image	Member	Party	Term		Notes
Image	Member	Party	Start	End	Notes
	Robyn Twell	Labor	26 March 1994	15 March 1997	Represented the abolished Fairfield Ward prior to the 1994 election. Withdrew as candidate shortly before the 1997 election.
	Catherine Bermingham	Labor	15 March 1997	15 March 2008	Ward abolished. Unsuccessfully contested Holland Park when East Brisbane was abolished.

== Results ==
=== 2004 ===
2004 Brisbane City Council election: East Brisbane Ward
Party	Candidate	Votes	%	±%
Labor	Catherine Bermingham	10,180	51.06	
Liberal	Adrian Schrinner	9,756	48.94	
Total formal votes		19,936	97.49	
Informal votes		513	2.51	
Turnout		20,449	80.34	
Two-party-preferred result
Labor	Catherine Bermingham	10,180	51.06	
Liberal	Adrian Schrinner	9,756	48.94	
Labor hold		Swing		
