= Wishart Ward =

Former Brisbane City Council ward

Wishart Ward Queensland — Brisbane City Council
- Abolished: 2016
- Namesake: Wishart

Wishart Ward was a Brisbane City Council ward covering Wishart and surrounding suburbs. It was abolished as part of the 2015 redistribution and split into Holland Park and MacGregor, with this taking affect at the 2016 election.

== History ==
Although considered a safe Liberal seat, Wishart became more marginal after a 2007 redistribution. Robbie Williams, who had been appointed as a councillor for Holland Park Ward in October 2007, had been preselected by the Labor Party to contest Wishart at the 2008 election. However, he died of a heart attack in December 2007.

As a result of the redistribution, Wishart councillor Graham Quirk moved to MacGregor Ward, and Krista Adams successfully ran for the Liberals in 2008. She was re-elected in 2012.

== Councillors for Wishart Ward ==
| Image | Member | Party | Term | Notes |
|---|---|---|---|---|
| | Graham Quirk | Liberal | 27 March 2004 – 15 March 2008 | Contested MacGregor Ward following redistribution. Elected. |
| | Krista Adams | Liberal | 15 March 2008 – 26 July 2008 | Contested Holland Park Ward following ward abolishment. Elected. |
| | Krista Adams | Liberal National | 26 July 2008 – 19 March 2016 | Contested Holland Park Ward following ward abolishment. Elected. |

== Results ==
=== 2004 ===
2004 Brisbane City Council election: Wishart Ward
| Party | Candidate | Votes | % | ±% |
|---|---|---|---|---|
| Liberal | Graham Quirk | 13,684 | 65.64 | |
| Labor | James Henley | 7,163 | 34.36 | |
| Total formal votes | | 20,847 | 97.68 | |
| Informal votes | | 496 | 2.32 | |
| Turnout | | 21,343 | 86.70 | |
Two-party-preferred result
| Liberal | Graham Quirk | 13,684 | 65.64 | |
| Labor | James Henley | 7,163 | 34.36 | |
| Liberal hold | | Swing | | |
