= Calamvale Ward =

Brisbane City Council ward

Calamvale Ward Queensland — Brisbane City Council
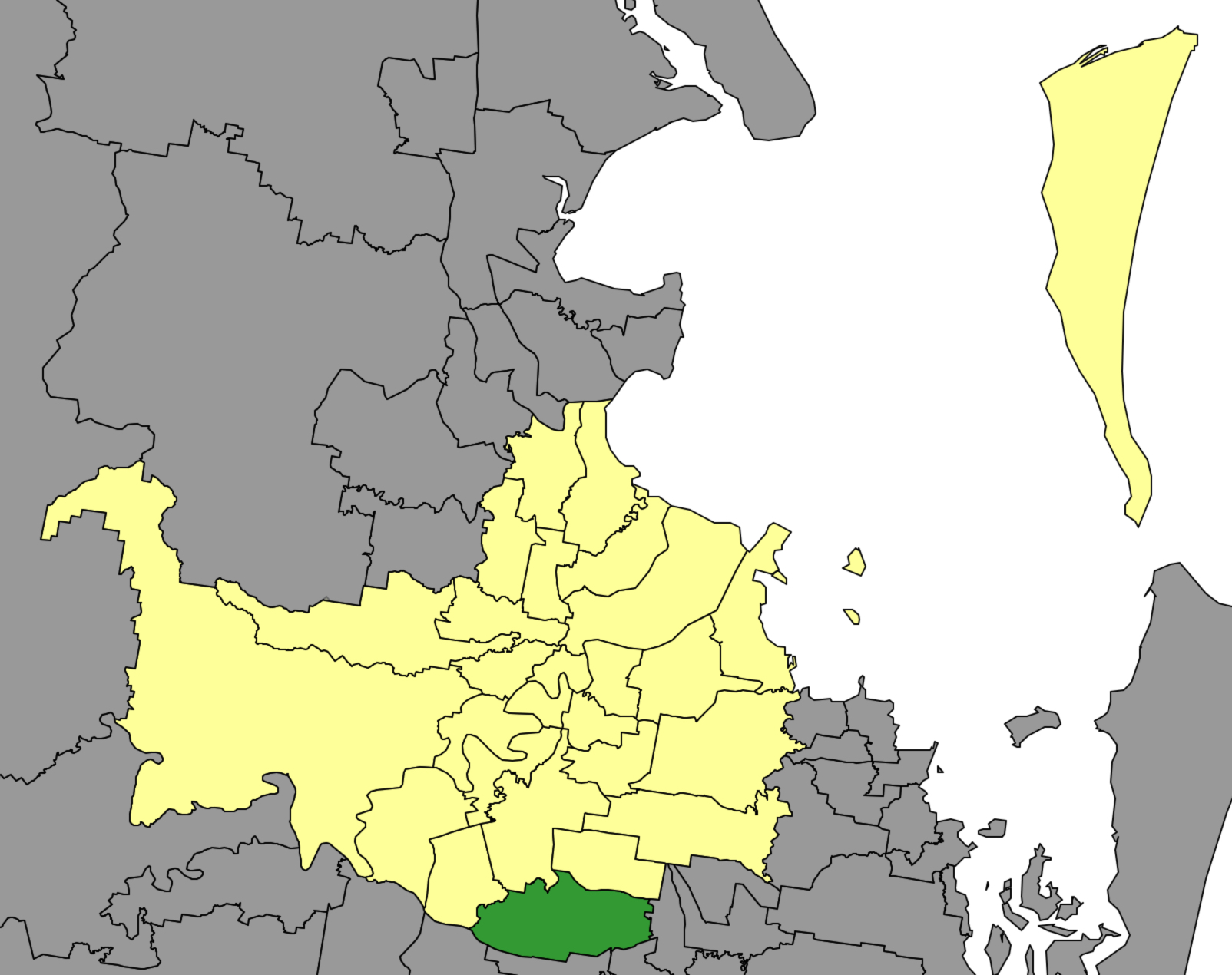
- Created: 2016
- Councillor: Emily Kim
- Party: Labor
- Namesake: Calamvale
- Electors: 35,712 (2024)
- Demographic: Outer metropolitan

Calamvale Ward is a Brisbane City Council ward covering Calamvale, Algester, Drewvale, Heathwood, Parkinson, Stretton, Larapinta, Karawatha, and part of Forest Lake. The ward is currently represented by Emily Kim of the Labor Party.

Calamvale replaced Parkinson Ward, which itself replaced Acacia Ridge Ward.

== History ==
A 2015 redistribution created Calamvale Ward, replacing Parkinson Ward while gaining area from the former Karawatha Ward in the east and losing area to Forest Lake and Moorooka Ward in the west. These changes increased the LNP margin from 17.1% to 18.1%. Owen-Taylor went on to win the 2016 election.

== Councillors for Calamvale Ward ==
Image	Member	Party	Term	Notes
	Angela Owen	Liberal National	19 March 2016 – 16 March 2024	Formerly known as Angela Owen-Taylor. Lost re-election.
	Emily Kim	Labor	16 March 2024 – present	Incumbent

== Electoral results ==
=== 2024 ===
2024 Queensland local elections: Calamvale Ward
Party	Candidate	Votes	%	±%
Liberal National	Angela Owen	13,447	45.02	−3.31
Labor	Emily Kim	13,280	44.46	+2.52
Greens	Andrea Wildin	3,141	10.52	+0.79
Total formal votes		29,868	97.81	+0.55
Informal votes		668	2.19	−0.55
Turnout		30,536	85.51	+3.38
Two-party-preferred result
Labor	Emily Kim	14,824	51.71	+3.95
Liberal National	Angela Owen	13,842	48.29	−3.95
Labor gain from Liberal National		Swing	+3.95	

=== 2020 ===
2020 Queensland local elections: Calamvale Ward
Party	Candidate	Votes	%	±%
Liberal National	Angela Owen	11,887	48.3	−10.9
Labor	James Martin	10,316	41.9	+11.4
Greens	Josie Mira	2,393	9.7	−0.5
Total formal votes		24,596		
Informal votes		692		
Turnout		25,288		
Two-party-preferred result
Liberal National	Angela Owen	12,156	52.2	−12.1
Labor	James Martin	11,113	47.8	+12.1
Liberal National hold		Swing	−12.1	

=== 2016 ===
2016 Queensland local elections:Calamvale Ward
Party	Candidate	Votes	%	±%
Liberal National	Angela Owen-Taylor	13,799	59.6	−8.4
Labor	Mukhtar Wesseh	7,004	30.3	−1.4
Greens	Janina Leo	2,332	10.1	+10.1
Total formal votes		23,135	-	−
Informal votes		822	-	−
Turnout		23,957	-	−
Two-party-preferred result
Liberal National	Angela Owen-Taylor	14,051	64.7	−3.4
Labor	Mukhtar Wesseh	7,653	35.3	+3.4
Liberal National hold		Swing	−3.4	
