= 2012 Brisbane City Council election =

- 28 April 2012
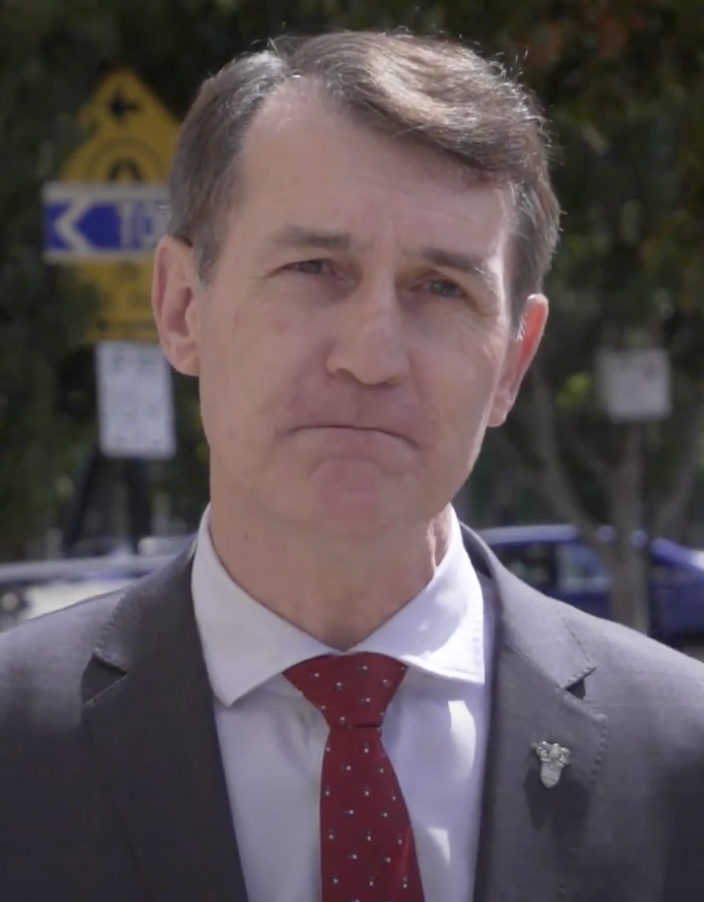

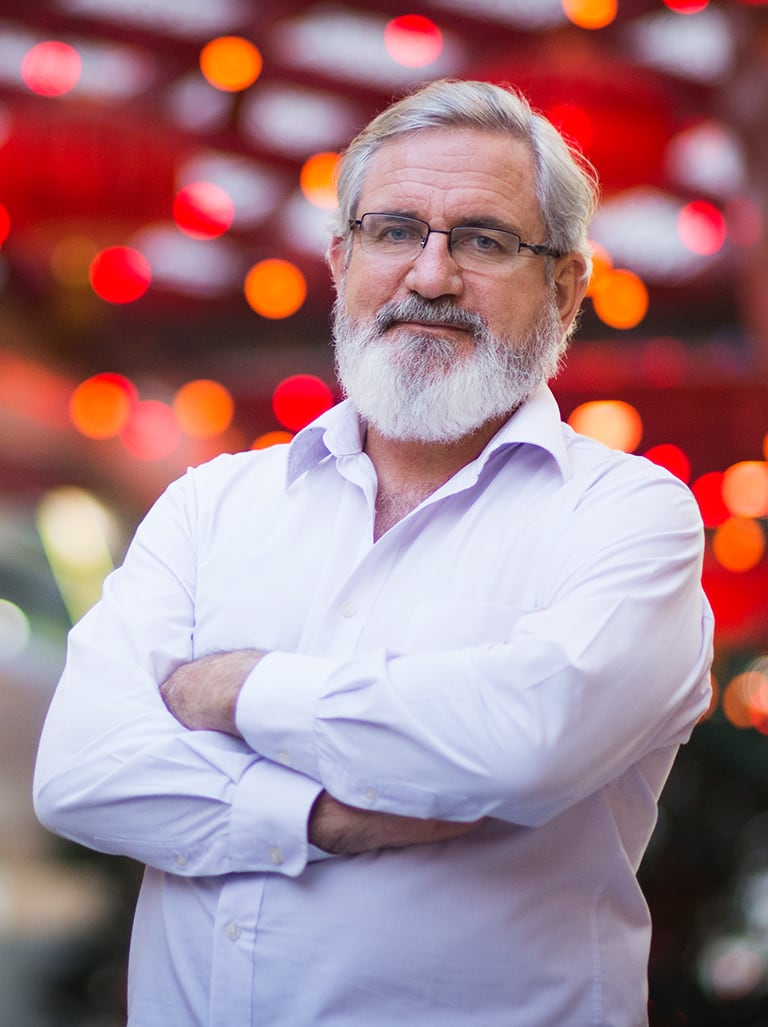
	First party	Second party	Third party
Candidate	Graham Quirk	Ray Smith	Andrew Bartlett
Party	Liberal National	Labor	Greens
Popular vote	333,637	135,534	57,641
Percentage	61.9%	25.2%	10.7%
Swing	▲1.9pp	▼3.9pp	▲2.3pp
TPP	68.5%	31.5%
TPP swing	▲2.4pp	▼2.4pp
Lord Mayor of Brisbane before election
Graham Quirk
Liberal National
Subsequent Lord Mayor
Graham Quirk
Liberal National
- All 26 wards on the City Council; 13 wards needed for a majority
Party	Leader	Vote %	Seats	+/–
Liberal National	Graham Quirk	57.1	18	+2
Labor	Ray Smith	32.0	7	−3
Independents	—	2.42	1	+1
This lists parties that won seats. See the complete results below.
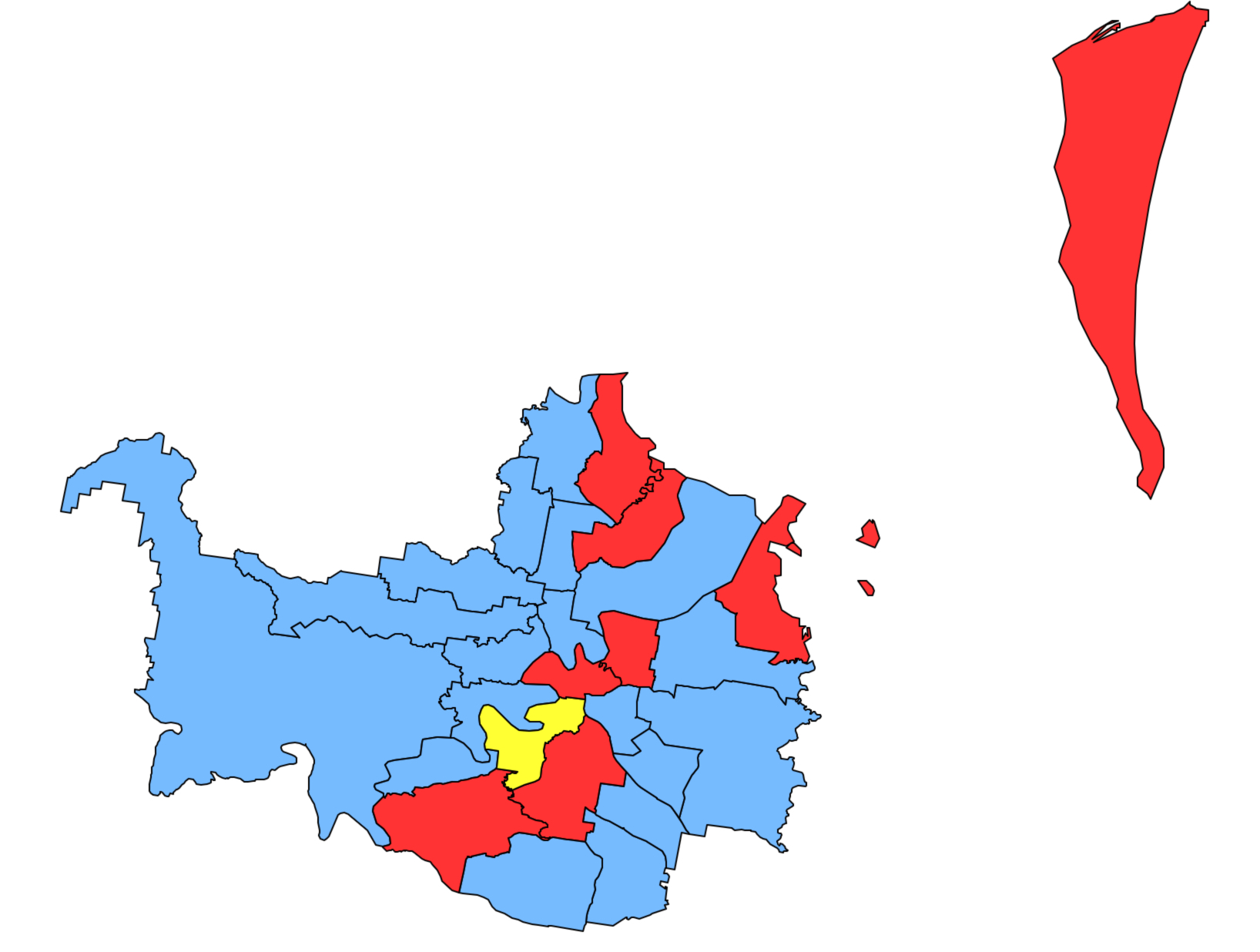
Results by ward

The 2012 Brisbane City Council election was held on 28 April 2012 to elect a lord mayor and 26 councillors to the City of Brisbane. The election was held as part of the statewide local government elections in Queensland, Australia.

The election resulted in a landslide re-election of the Liberal National Party (previously represented in Queensland as the Liberal Party), increasing their representation by two wards. The incumbent Lord Mayor, Graham Quirk, was elected to his first full-term with a substantial 68.3% of the two-party-preferred vote.

== Results ==
=== Mayoral election ===
2012 Queensland mayoral elections: Brisbane
Party	Candidate	Votes	%	±%
Liberal National	Graham Quirk	333,637	61.94	+1.87
Labor	Ray Smith	135,534	25.16	−3.85
Greens	Andrew Bartlett	57,641	10.70	+2.32
Sex Party	Rory Killen	7,125	1.32	+1.32
Independent	Chris Carson	4,733	0.88	+0.88
Total formal votes		538,670		
Informal votes		11,778		
Turnout		550,448		
Two-party-preferred result
Liberal National	Graham Quirk	340,464	68.53	+2.43
Labor	Ray Smith	156,357	31.47	−2.43
Liberal National **hold**		**Swing**	+2.43	

Mayor popular vote
LNP	61.9%
Labor	25.2%
Greens	10.7%
Other	2.2%

Ward popular vote
LNP	57.1%
Labor	32.0%
Greens	8.5%
Other	2.4%

Wards
LNP	69.23%
Labor	19.23%
Greens	0.0%
Other	3.84%

=== Councillor elections ===
The Liberal National's gained the wards of Doboy and Karawatha from the Labor Party and lost the ward of Tennyson to an independent, for a net gain of two wards and a majority of 18 wards, to their nearest competitor, Labor's at 7 wards.

Ward	2008 election			Swing	2012 election		
Ward	Party	Councillor	Margin	Swing	Margin	Councillor	Party
Bracken Ridge	Liberal National	Amanda Cooper	13.88%	7.39	21.27%	Amanda Cooper	Liberal National
**Central**	Labor	David Hinchliffe	0.28%	-9.63	9.35%	Vicki Howard	Liberal National
Chandler	Liberal National	Adrian Schrinner	21.19%	6.42	27.61%	Adrian Schrinner	Liberal National
Deagon	Labor	Victoria Newton	7.92%	-1.62	6.30%	Victoria Newton	Labor
**Doboy**	Labor	John Campbell	0.97%	-5.36	4.39%	Ryan Murphy	Liberal National
Enoggera	Liberal National	Andrew Wines	0.82%	14.73	15.55%	Andrew Wines	Liberal National
Hamilton	Liberal National	David McLachlan	20.38%	4.82	25.20%	David McLachlan	Liberal National
Holland Park	Liberal National	Ian McKenzie	5.61%	4.36	9.97%	Ian McKenzie	Liberal National
Jamboree	Liberal National	Matthew Bourke	1.50%	25.64	27.14%	Matthew Bourke	Liberal National
**Karawatha**	Labor	Gail Macpherson	1.51%	-17.71	16.20%	Kim Marx	Liberal National
MacGregor	Liberal National	Graham Quirk^{1}	21.13%	3.09	24.22%	Steven Huang	Liberal National
Marchant	Liberal National	Fiona King	7.99%	8.79	16.78%	Fiona King	Liberal National
McDowall	Liberal National	Norm Wyndham	21.60%	2.07	23.67%	Norm Wyndham	Liberal National
Moorooka	Labor	Steve Griffiths	4.03%	7.03	11.06%	Steve Griffiths	Labor
Morningside	Labor	Shayne Sutton	11.63%	-5.05	6.58%	Shayne Sutton	Labor
Northgate	Labor	Kim Flesser	1.55%	-0.73	0.82%	Kim Flesser	Labor
Parkinson	Liberal National	Angela Owen-Taylor	6.27%	10.59	16.86%	Angela Owen-Taylor	Liberal National
Pullenvale	Liberal National	Margaret De Wit	30.61%	1.25	31.86%	Margaret De Wit	Liberal National
Richlands	Labor	Milton Dick	4.02%	15.84	20.18%	Milton Dick	Labor
**Tennyson**	Liberal National	Nicole Johnston	13.32%	N/A	8.25%	Nicole Johnston^{2}	Independent
The Gabba	Labor	Helen Abrahams	2.73%	6.13	8.86%	Helen Abrahams	Labor
The Gap	Liberal National	Geraldine Knapp	18.68%	4.10	22.78%	Geraldine Knapp	Liberal National
Toowong	Liberal National	Peter Matic	11.76%	0.27	12.03%	Peter Matic	Liberal National
Walter Taylor	Liberal National	Jane Prentice^{3}	21.02%	4.88	25.90%	Julian Simmonds	Liberal National
Wishart	Liberal National	Krista Adams	13.31%	8.15	21.46%	Krista Adams	Liberal National
Wynnum Manly	Labor	Peter Cumming	9.06%	-7.42	1.64%	Peter Cumming	Labor

Wards with names listed in bold changed hands from Labor to Liberal National in the 2012 election.

Councillors whose names are in italics did not stand in the 2012 election for the seat they won in 2008.

^{1} Graham Quirk was appointed Lord Mayor after the resignation of Campbell Newman in 2011. Steven Huang was appointed Councillor for MacGregor Ward in his place.

^{2} Nicole Johnston was elected as a member of the LNP in 2008 but resigned from the party to sit as an independent.

^{3} Jane Prentice resigned from Council in 2010 to contest the Federal electorate of Ryan for the LNP. Julian Simmonds of the LNP was elected Councillor at a by-election in October that year.
