= Richlands Ward =

Former Brisbane City Council ward

Richlands Ward Queensland — Brisbane City Council
- Created: 1994
- Abolished: 2016
- Namesake: Richlands

Richlands Ward was a Brisbane City Council ward covering Richlands and surrounding suburbs. The ward established for the 1994 election, partly replacing the former Inala Ward, and existed until the 2016 election where it was largely replaced by Forest Lake Ward.

== History ==
Les Bryant won Richlands at the 1994 election, and was re-elected in 1997, 2000 and 2004.

Bryant nominated for Labor preselection for the 2008 election, but withdrew after then-Labor state secretary Milton Dick chose to contest the seat. Dick was not a resident of the ward at the time he announced his candidacy, but announced he would relocate from his home in Clayfield, and was endorsed by prime minister Kevin Rudd.

Dick was deputy leader of the opposition on council until 2012. At the election in March of that year, he substantially increased the Labor majority with a 13.7% swing in his favour, and he was subsequently made leader of the opposition, serving in that role until 2016.

== Councillors for Richlands Ward ==
Image	Member	Party	Term	Notes
	Les Bryant	Labor	26 March 1994 – 15 March 2008	Councillor for Inala Ward from 1991 to 1994. Successfully contested Richlands Ward when Inala was abolished
	Milton Dick (b. 1972)	Labor	15 March 2008 – 19 March 2016	Chose not to contest Forest Lake Ward in 2016 when Richlands was abolished. Successfully contested Oxley at 2016 federal election

== Results ==
=== 2004 ===
2004 Brisbane City Council election: Richlands Ward
Party	Candidate	Votes	%	±%
Labor	Les Bryant	12,106	57.26	
Liberal	Alastair Smith	5,732	27.11	
Independent	George Pugh	1,743	8.24	
Greens	Nigel David Quinlan	1,560	7.38	
Total formal votes		21,141	96.87	
Informal votes		684	3.13	
Turnout		21,825	86.46	
Two-party-preferred result
Labor	Les Bryant	12,627	65.82	
Liberal	Alastair Smith	6,557	34.18	
Labor hold		Swing		
