= Greg Rowell =

Australian cricketer (born 1966)

Personal information
- Full name: Gregory John Rowell
- Born: 1 September 1966 (age 60); Lindfield, New South Wales, Australia
- Height: 204 cm (6 ft 8 in)
- Batting: Right-handed
- Bowling: Right-arm fast-medium
- Role: Bowler

Domestic team information
- Years: Team
- 1989/90–1990/91: New South Wales
- 1991/92–1997/98: Queensland
- 1998/99: Tasmania

Career statistics
Competition	First-class	List A
Matches	46	27
Runs scored	527	51
Batting average	11.45	8.50
100s/50s	0/0	0/0
Top score	45*	17*
Balls bowled	9,623	1,440
Wickets	147	27
Bowling average	30.98	34.03
5 wickets in innings	4	0
10 wickets in match	1	0
Best bowling	7/46	3/30
Catches/stumpings	26/–	5/–
- Source: CricketArchive, 16 August 2010

Gregory John Rowell (born 1 September 1966) is an Australian cricketer who played for Queensland, New South Wales, and Tasmania. He was a right-handed batsman and right-arm fast bowler who was born at Lindfield, New South Wales.

On 11 May 2007, Rowell announced his intention to stand as the Labor candidate for Lord Mayor in the 2008 Brisbane City Council election . He secured 29% of the primary vote and lost to incumbent Campbell Newman.

Since then, Rowell has campaigned strongly on the issues of securing water for Brisbane's future and the need to provide better public transport.
