= Central Ward (City of Brisbane) =

Brisbane City Council ward

- Central Ward, 2024
- Created: 1994
- Councillor: Vicki Howard
- Party: Liberal National
- Namesake: Brisbane (Central - CBD)
- Electors: 33,421 (2024)
- Demographic: Inner metropolitan

Central Ward is a Brisbane City Council ward covering the CBD, Fortitude Valley, New Farm, Spring Hill, Herston, Bowen Hills, Newstead and Teneriffe. The current councillor is Vicki Howard of the Liberal National Party, who gained the ward from Labor at the 2012 election.

== History ==
Central Ward was established as part of a redistribution ahead of the 1994 election which saw a significant reorganisation of the city's inner wards in particular. The new ward was created from parts of four abolished wards, taking in parts of the abolished Breakfast Creek, Spring Hill, second Paddington Ward, and original The Gabba Ward. The ward combined the CBD and suburbs directly north of it (from Spring Hill Ward) with those to the east (from Breakfast Creek Ward) and those to the west (from Paddington Ward), making use of Breakfast Creek, Enoggera Creek, and Ithaca Creek as the northern boundary upstream to Jubilee Terrace. The ward also crossed the Brisbane River to include the South Bank riverfront, which (along with the creation of Walter Taylor Ward) ended an established practice of separating the city's wards into two zones using the Brisbane River.

At its creation, the ward included the suburbs of Bowen Hills, Brisbane City, Fortitude Valley, Herston, Kelvin Grove, Milton, New Farm, Newstead, Paddington, Petrie Terrace, Red Hill, Spring Hill, and Teneriffe, along with a small part of Bardon (east of Jubilee Terrace) and part of South Brisbane (bounded by Dock St, Vulture St, Cordelia St, and Boundary St).

At the 1994 election, David Hinchliffe, who had represented Spring Hill Ward since 1988,, won the ward for the Labor Party. Hinchliffe retained the ward at the 1997 election.

A redistribution ahead of the 2000 election saw Central Ward contract considerably, losing area to four surrounding wards. The ward lost its part of South Brisbane to Dutton Park Ward, shifting the ward entirely north of the Brisbane River. It also lost part of Milton (south of Heussler Tce) to Toowong Ward; Herston and part of Kelvin Grove (east of Kelvin Grove Road) to Grange Ward; and parts of Bowen Hills (north of Campbell St/Cowlishaw St) and Newstead (north of Commercial Rd/Chermside St) to Hamilton Ward.

Hinchcliffe retained the ward for the Labor party at the 2000 and 2004 elections, though his party's vote began to decline from the 2004 election onwards.

Another redistribution ahead of the 2008 election saw the ward contract significantly east. The ward lost its small part of Bardon and the western part of Red Hill to The Gap Ward, along with Paddington, Petrie Terrace, the remainder of Red Hill, western Kelvin Grove, and a small part of Brisbane City (west of the William Jolly Bridge). The ward also extended northward, regaining the area it lost to the (now-abolished) Grange Ward, along with Wilston and parts of Grange, Newmarket, and Windsor north of Enoggera Creek. These changes significantly reduced incumbent Hinchcliffe's effective two-party margin from the 2004 election from 12% to 8.4%, with him only narrowly retaining the ward at the 2008 election.

Hinchliffe retired ahead of the 2012 election, and Vicki Howard won the ward for the LNP.

The redistribution ahead of the 2016 election again altered the ward's boundaries. The ward's northern boundary was re-aligned with Breakfast Creek and Enoggera Creek; regaining the rest of Bowen Hills and Newstead from Hamilton Ward, and losing the suburbs north of the creek to Enoggera and Marchant wards. The ward also lost the remainder of Kelvin Grove to the newly-created Paddington Ward (which largely succeeded Toowong Ward), along with regaining the small part of Brisbane City. Howard retained the ward at the 2016 election.

Due to significant population growth in the ward, an additional redistribution was triggered ahead of the 2020 election. The ward again lost parts of Bowen Hills and Newstead to Hamilton Ward, along with again losing the suburb of Herston (this time to Paddington Ward).

Howard retained the ward at the 2020 election, with only a small reduction in her primary vote. This election saw Labor replaced by the Queensland Greens as the party receiving the second highest vote.

At the 2024 election Howard again retained the ward for the LNP, though her margin against the Greens more than halved from 7.8% to 3%.

== Councillors for Central Ward ==
Image	Member	Party	Term		Notes
Image	Member	Party	Start	End	Notes
	David Hinchliffe	Labor	26 March 1994	28 April 2012	Previously represented Spring Hill Ward from 1988. Did not recontest 2012 election.
	Vicki Howard	Liberal National	28 April 2012	–	Incumbent

== Results ==
=== 2024 ===
2024 Queensland local elections: Central Ward
Party	Candidate	Votes	%	±%
Liberal National	Vicki Howard	11,674	46.69	−1.71
Greens	Wendy Aghdam	8,888	35.55	+8.05
Labor	Ash Murray	4,440	17.76	−6.34
Total formal votes		25,002	98.37	+0.39
Informal votes		414	1.63	−0.39
Turnout		25,416	76.05	+6.63
Two-party-preferred result
Liberal National	Vicki Howard	12,331	52.98	−4.79
Greens	Wendy Aghdam	10,944	47.02	+4.79
Liberal National hold		Swing	−4.79	

=== 2020 ===
2020 Queensland local elections: Central Ward
Party	Candidate	Votes	%	±%
Liberal National	Vicki Howard	9,800	48.40	–2.44
Greens	Trina Massey	5,568	27.50	+5.01
Labor	Judi Jabour	4,879	24.10	–2.57
Total formal votes		20,247	97.98	+0.28
Informal votes		418	2.02	–0.28
Turnout		20,665	69.58	–5.85
Notional two-party-preferred count
Liberal National	Vicki Howard	10,333	57.56	–0.65
Labor	Judy Jabour	7,619	42.44	+0.65
Two-party-preferred result
Liberal National	Vicki Howard	10,359	57.77	–0.44
Greens	Trina Massey	7,573	42.23	+42.23
Liberal National hold		Swing	–0.44	

=== 2016 ===
2016 Queensland local elections: Central Ward
Party	Candidate	Votes	%	±%
Liberal National	Vicki Howard	10,430	50.84	–0.60
Labor	Amber Hawkins	5,471	26.67	–3.82
Greens	Kirsten Lovejoy	4,614	22.49	+4.42
Total formal votes		20,515	97.70	–0.47
Informal votes		484	2.30	+0.47
Turnout		20,999	75.43	+1.42
Two-party-preferred result
Liberal National	Vicki Howard	10,878	58.21	–0.44
Labor	Amber Hawkins	7,808	41.79	+0.44
Liberal National hold		Swing	–0.44	

=== 2012 ===
2012 Brisbane City Council election: Central Ward
Party	Candidate	Votes	%	±%
Liberal National	Vicki Howard	10,284	51.44	+9.48
Labor	Heather Beattie	6,096	30.49	–9.11
Greens	Rachael Jacobs	3,613	18.07	+1.46
Total formal votes		19,993	98.17	–0.22
Informal votes		372	1.83	+0.22
Turnout		20,365	74.01	–3.59
Two-party-preferred result
Liberal National	Vicki Howard	10,672	58.65	+8.93
Labor	Heather Beattie	7,525	41.35	–8.93
Liberal National gain from Labor		Swing	+8.93	

=== 2008 ===
2008 Queensland local elections: Central Ward
Party	Candidate	Votes	%	±%
Liberal	Vicki Howard	8,709	41.96	+10.89
Labor	David Hinchliffe	8,219	39.60	–8.08
Greens	Anne Boccabella	3,450	16.61	–1.13
Independent	David White	379	1.83	+1.83
Total formal votes		20,757	98.39	+0.31
Informal votes		340	1.61	–0.31
Turnout		21,097	77.60	−
Two-party-preferred result
Labor	David Hinchliffe	9,173	50.28	–11.76
Liberal	Vicki Howard	9,071	49.72	+11.76
Labor hold		Swing	–11.76	

=== 2004 ===
2004 Brisbane City Council election: Central Ward
Party	Candidate	Votes	%	±%
Labor	David Hinchliffe	9,198	47.75	
Liberal	Rodney Maller	6,052	31.42	
Greens	Colin Sweett	3,378	17.54	
Independent	Coral Wynter	634	3.29	
Total formal votes		19,262	98.16	
Informal votes		362	1.84	
Turnout		19,624	75.11	
Two-party-preferred result
Labor	David Hinchliffe	10,434	62.04	
Liberal	Rodney Maller	6,383	37.96	
Labor hold		Swing		
