= 2008 Brisbane City Council election =

- 15 March 2008

26 wards of Brisbane City Council
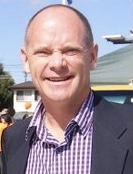

	First party	Second party
Leader	Campbell Newman	Greg Rowell
Party	Liberal	Labor
Leader since	2004
Last election	11 wards	15 wards
Seats won	16 wards	10 wards
Seat change	▲5	▼5
Popular vote	335,076	161,845
Percentage	60.1%	29.0%
Swing	▲12.9pp	▼11.6pp
2PP	66.1%	33.9%
2PP swing	▲13.7pp	▼13.7pp
Lord Mayor of Brisbane before election
Campbell Newman
Liberal
Subsequent Lord Mayor
Campbell Newman
Liberal

The 2008 Brisbane City Council election was held on 15 March 2008 to elect a lord mayor and 26 councillors to the City of Brisbane. The election was held as part of the statewide local government elections in Queensland, Australia.

The election resulted in the re-election of Campbell Newman of the Liberal Party as Lord Mayor, defeating Labor's Greg Rowell in a landslide with 66.1% of the mayoral two-party-preferred vote. The Liberals also won control of the council chambers, taking 5 wards from Labor for a total of 16 to Labor's 10. This was also the final BCC election contested by the Queensland Liberals, as they merged with the Queensland Nationals to form the Liberal National Party of Queensland a few months later in July.

== Results ==
=== Mayor ===
2008 Queensland mayoral elections: Brisbane
Party	Candidate	Votes	%	±%
Liberal	Campbell Newman	335,076	60.07	+12.87
Labor	Greg Rowell	161,845	29.01	−11.59
Greens	Jo-Anne Bragg	46,733	8.38	−1.82
Independent	Robert Campbell	8,439	1.51	+1.51
Independent	Louise Day	1,801	0.32	+0.32
Independent	Bryan Crawford	1,331	0.24	+0.24
Independent	David Alan Couper	952	0.17	+0.17
Independent	James Patrick Sinnamon	856	0.15	+0.15
Independent	Derek Rosborough	773	0.14	+0.14
Total formal votes		557,806		
Informal votes		9,618		
Turnout		567,424		
Two-party-preferred result
Liberal	Campbell Newman		66.1	+13.7
Labor	Greg Rowell		33.9	−13.7
Liberal hold		Swing	+13.7	

=== Councillors ===
Ward	Party	Councillor	Margin (%)
Bracken Ridge	Liberal	Amanda Cooper	
Central	Labor	David Hinchliffe	
Chandler	Liberal	Adrian Schrinner	
Deagon	Labor	Victoria Newton	
Doboy	Labor	John Campbell	
Enoggera	Liberal	Andrew Wines	
Hamilton	Liberal	David McLachlan	
Holland Park	Liberal	Ian McKenzie	
Jamboree	Liberal	Matthew Bourke	
Karawatha	Labor	Gail Macpherson	
MacGregor	Liberal	Graham Quirk	
Marchant	Liberal	Fiona King	
McDowall	Liberal	Norm Wyndham	
Moorooka	Labor	Steve Griffiths	
Morningside	Labor	Shayne Sutton	
Northgate	Labor	Kim Flesser	
Parkinson	Liberal	Angela Owen-Taylor	
Pullenvale	Liberal	Margaret De Wit	
Richlands	Labor	Milton Dick	
Tennyson	Liberal	Nicole Johnston	
The Gabba	Labor	Helen Abrahams	
The Gap	Liberal	Geraldine Knapp	
Toowong	Liberal	Peter Matic	
Walter Taylor	Liberal	Jane Prentice	
Wishart	Liberal	Krista Adams	
Wynnum Manly	Labor	Peter Cumming	
