= Jim Soorley =

Australian politician

- Soorley in January 1997

13th Lord Mayor of Brisbane
- In office 30 March 1991 – 30 May 2003
- Preceded by: Sallyanne Atkinson
- Succeeded by: Tim Quinn

Personal details
- Born: James Gerard Soorley; 8 April 1951 (age 75) Murwillumbah, New South Wales
- Party: Labor
- Education: Macquarie University; Loyola University Chicago

James Gerard Soorley (born 8 April 1951) is an Australian lobbyist and former politician. He served as Labor Lord Mayor of Brisbane from 1991 to 2003. A laicised Catholic priest, Soorley has a Bachelor of Arts, majoring in psychology, from Macquarie University, and a Master of Arts in organisational psychology from Loyola University Chicago.

== Lord Mayor of Brisbane ==
The 1991 election was a close election with Soorley just edging out then-Lord Mayor of Brisbane, Sallyanne Atkinson through the preferences of Drew Hutton, the Greens candidate. Soorley was not expected to wrest the Lord Mayoralty from the very popular first female (and first Liberal Party) mayor of Brisbane. The transition period between Atkinson's administration and the incoming Soorley administration was difficult, with the outgoing Atkinson refusing to believe she had lost the election for many weeks afterward.

Soorley also instituted a number of institutional changes including a 24/7 Call Centre; "business style" accounting for budgets and annual reporting, enterprise bargaining, significant changes to leave and other entitlements, increased employment opportunities through increased apprenticeships, traineeships and community jobs programs, including a nationally awarded program for "at risk youth" who were recovering from drug addiction, as well as a shift from Brisbane Council being only concerned with "rates, roads, rubbish" to taking on issues such as drug use, homelessness, domestic violence and social justice.

In 1995, Soorley ended Brisbane's sister city relationship with the French Riviera town of Nice due to France's resumption of nuclear testing, a move which he described as a "symbolic protest."

== Post-political career ==
Soorley currently writes a weekly column for The Sunday Mail and is a registered lobbyist in Queensland. Previously, he has held roles including Chairman of Noosa, Sunshine Coast and City of Moreton Bay water business Unitywater, and a board member of government-owned electricity generation company CS Energy.

Civic offices
| Preceded by Sallyanne Atkinson | Lord Mayor of Brisbane; 1991–2003 | Succeeded by Tim Quinn |
