= Acacia Ridge Ward =

Australian local government ward

Acacia Ridge Ward Queensland — Brisbane City Council
- Created: 1994
- Abolished: 2008
- Namesake: Acacia Ridge
- Demographic: Outer metropolitan

Acacia Ridge Ward was a Brisbane City Council ward covering Acacia Ridge and surrounding suburbs. It was abolished as part of the 2007 redistribution and replaced by the Parkinson Ward, this taking effect at the 2008 election.

Kevin Bianchi of Labor was the only councillor to represent Acacia Ridge Ward. Bianchi was elected in 1994, and re-elected in 1997, 2000, and 2004, the last time with a 3.8% margin.

== Councillors for Acacia Ridge Ward ==
Image	Member	Party	Term	Notes
	Kevin Bianchi	Labor	26 March 1994 – 15 March 2008	Represented preceding Coopers Plains Ward from 1991. Retired.

== Results ==
=== 2004 ===
2004 Brisbane City Council election: Acacia Ridge Ward
Party	Candidate	Votes	%	±%
Labor	Kevin Bianchi	11,935	53.81	
Liberal	Angela Owen-Taylor	10,246	46.19	
Total formal votes		22,181	97.20	
Informal votes		640	2.80	
Turnout		22,821	87.75	
Two-party-preferred result
Labor	Kevin Bianchi	11,935	53.81	
Liberal	Angela Owen-Taylor	10,246	46.19	
Labor hold		Swing		
