= Runcorn Ward =

Brisbane City Council ward in Australia

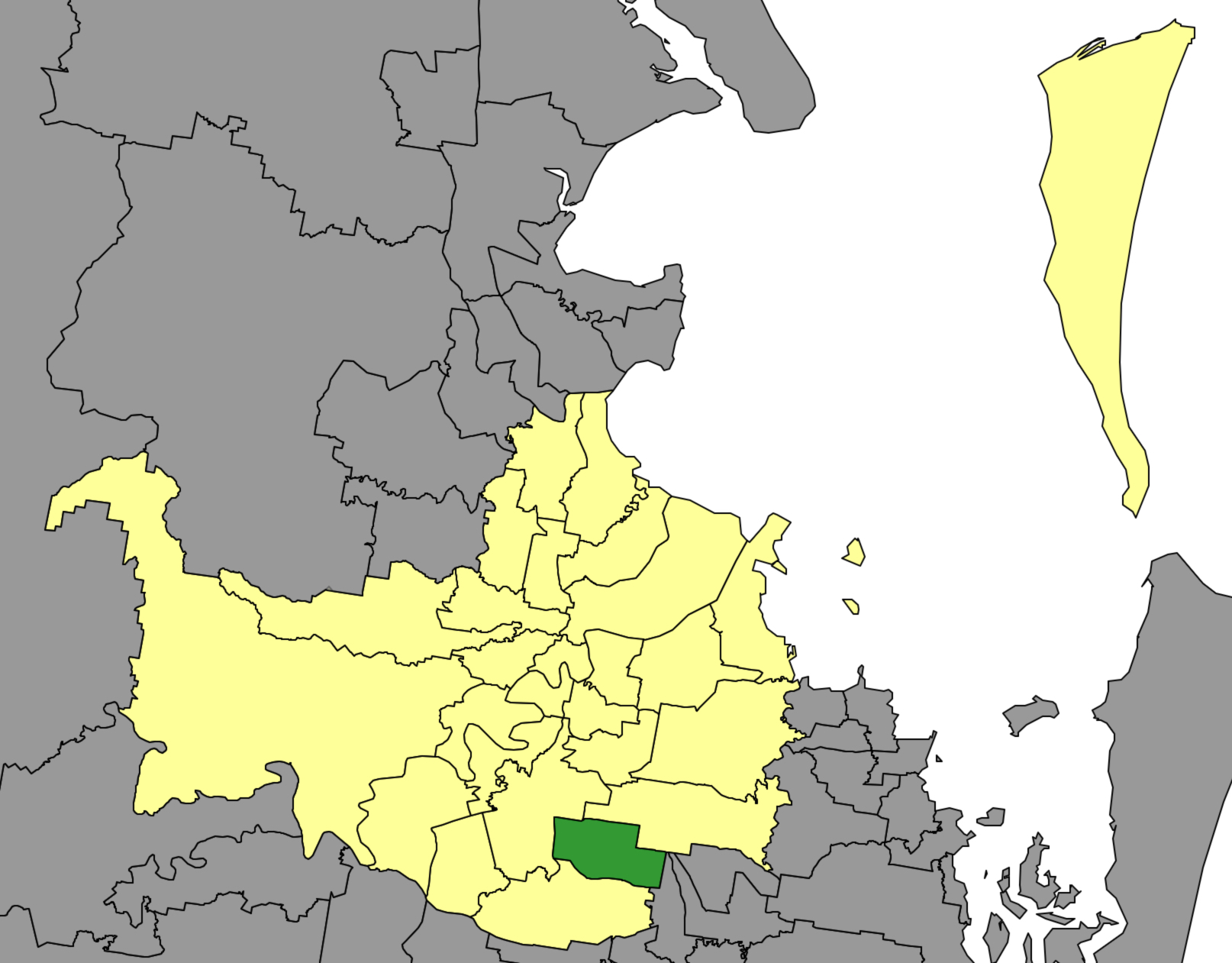
- Created: 2016
- MP: Kim Marx
- Party: Liberal National
- Namesake: Runcorn
- Electors: 31,686 (2024)
- Demographic: Outer metropolitan

The Runcorn Ward is a Brisbane City Council ward covering Kuraby, Runcorn, Sunnybank and Sunnybank Hills.

== History ==
=== Runcorn Ward (first iteration) ===
Runcorn Ward was created ahead of the 1985 election.

Member	Party	Term
Bob Ward	Liberal	1985–1994
Gail MacPherson	Labor	1994–2008

=== Karawatha Ward ===
The 2007 Electoral Commission Redistribution split the former Runcorn Ward into Karawatha Ward and MacGregor Ward. Gail MacPherson of Labor (who had previously been the representative for Runcorn) ran for Karawatha at the 2008 election and was re-elected. MacPherson retired in 2012 and the election held that year saw Kim Marx elected with a 17.8% swing.

Member	Party	Term
Gail MacPherson	Labor	2008–2012
Kim Marx	Liberal National	2012–2016

=== Runcorn Ward (second iteration) ===
The 2015 Electoral Commission Redistribution created Runcorn Ward, replacing Karawatha Ward while gaining area from MacGregor Ward. These changes increased the LNP margin from 16.3% to 17.3%. Marx went on to win the 2016 election.

Member	Party	Term
Kim Marx	Liberal National	2016–present

== Results ==
=== 2024 ===
2024 Queensland local elections: Runcorn Ward
Party	Candidate	Votes	%	±%
Liberal National	Kim Marx	13,086	50.85	−3.25
Labor	John Prescott	8,952	34.79	−0.71
Greens	Emma Eastaughffe	3,695	14.36	+3.96
Total formal votes		25,733	97.36	
Informal votes		686	2.64	
Turnout		26,430	83.41	
Two-party-preferred result
Liberal National	Kim Marx	13,541	55.82	−2.48
Labor	John Prescott	10,716	44.18	+2.48
Liberal National hold		Swing	−2.48	

=== 2020 ===
2020 Queensland local elections: Runcorn Ward
Party	Candidate	Votes	%	±%
Liberal National	Kim Marx	12,949	54.1	−0.1
Labor	John Prescott	8,491	35.5	−0.4
Greens	Nicola Gordon	2,482	10.4	+0.5
Total formal votes		23,922		
Informal votes		698		
Turnout		24,620		
Two-party-preferred result
Liberal National	Kim Marx	13,269	58.3	−0.3
Labor	John Prescott	9,501	41.7	+0.3
Liberal National hold		Swing	−0.3	

=== 2016 ===
2016 Queensland local elections: Runcorn Ward
Party	Candidate	Votes	%	±%
Liberal National	Kim Marx	12,210	53.8	−10.9
Labor	Stanley Hsu	8,281	36.5	+7.2
Greens	Edward Starr	2,204	9.7	+6.7
Total formal votes		22,695	-	−
Informal votes		759	-	−
Turnout		23,454	-	−
Two-party-preferred result
Liberal National	Kim Marx	12,471	58	−10.3
Labor	Stanley Hsu	9,040	42	+10.3
Liberal National hold		Swing	−10.3	

=== 2004 ===
2004 Brisbane City Council election: Runcorn Ward
Party	Candidate	Votes	%	±%
Labor	Gail MacPherson	11,755	52.19	
Liberal	Kathryn Jenkins	10,768	47.81	
Total formal votes		22,523	97.35	
Informal votes		614	2.65	
Turnout		23,137	87.10	
Two-party-preferred result
Labor	Gail MacPherson	11,755	52.19	
Liberal	Kathryn Jenkins	10,768	47.81	
Labor hold		Swing		
