= Milton Dick =

Australian politician (born 1972)

The Honourable Milton Dick MP
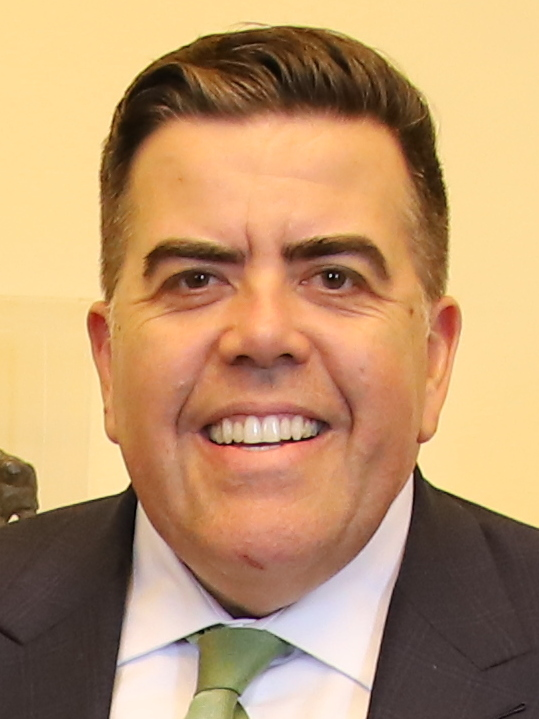
- Dick in 2023

32nd Speaker of the Australian House of Representatives
- Incumbent
- Assumed office 26 July 2022
- Deputy: Sharon Claydon
- Preceded by: Andrew Wallace

32nd President of the Inter-Parliamentary Union
- Incumbent
- Assumed office 9 October 2026
- Preceded by: Tulia Ackson

Member of the Australian Parliament for Oxley
- Incumbent
- Assumed office 2 July 2016
- Preceded by: Bernie Ripoll

Leader of the Opposition of Brisbane City Council
- Leader of the Labor Party
- In office 1 May 2012 – 19 March 2016
- Preceded by: Shayne Sutton
- Succeeded by: Peter Cumming

Councillor of the City of Brisbane for Richlands Ward
- In office 15 March 2008 – 19 March 2016
- Preceded by: Les Bryant
- Succeeded by: Charles Strunk

Secretary of the Queensland Labor Party
- In office 4 April 2004 – 15 March 2008
- Leader: Peter Beattie; Anna Bligh
- Preceded by: Cameron Milner
- Succeeded by: Anthony Chisholm

Personal details
- Born: 21 July 1972 (age 54) Brisbane, Queensland, Australia
- Party: Labor
- Relations: Cameron Dick (brother)
- Education: Anglican Church Grammar School; University of Queensland, BA
- Website: www.miltondick.com.au

Dugald Milton Dick (born 21 July 1972) is an Australian politician who has served as the 32nd Speaker of the Australian House of Representatives since 2022. A member of the Labor Party, he has been the Member of Parliament for the Queensland division of Oxley since 2016.

Dick previously served as a councillor of the Brisbane City Council from 2008 to 2016 and was the state secretary of the Queensland Labor Party from 2004 to 2008. His brother is Cameron Dick, the former deputy premier of Queensland and treasurer of Queensland.

Dick was elected President of the Inter-Parliamentary Union on the 9th of October, 2026, succeeding former Tanzanian Speaker of the National Assembly, Dr Tulia Ackson.

== Early life ==
Dick was born in Brisbane on 21 July 1972 to Joan and Allan Dick. His father was a World War II naval veteran and subsequently established a chain of butcher's shops in Brisbane's southern suburbs, while his mother was a midwife. He attended the Anglican Church Grammar School and holds the degree of Bachelor of Arts from the University of Queensland.

== Politics ==
Dick joined the ALP at the age of 18 as a university student and served as national president of Young Labor. From 1993 to 1998, he worked as an electorate officer for David Beddall, describing his door to door campaigning in Inala, Queensland as his first real break in politics. He went on to work for Senator John Hogg, the President of the Senate, from 1998 to 2000. Hogg became a mentor from this time on. Dick became an ALP organiser and was appointed as the party's state secretary and campaign director in 2004, having served as a delegate to the national conference since 2001. He led the party's successful campaign in Queensland at the 2007 federal election. He announced his resignation in December 2007 to stand for political office, effective in March 2008.

=== Local government ===
In 2008, Dick was elected to the Brisbane City Council as the representative of Richlands Ward. He was not a resident of the ward at the time he announced his candidacy, but announced he would relocate from his home in Clayfield. He was endorsed by the incumbent prime minister Kevin Rudd. Dick was deputy leader of the opposition on the council until 2012. Following a significant defeat in the 2012 Brisbane City Council election, which reduced Labor's seat count from 10 to 7 in the council chamber, Dick was subsequently made the leader of the opposition. He served in that role until his resignation in 2016. He was also the opposition spokesman for financial services.

=== Federal politics ===
Following Labor's defeat at the 2013 federal election, Dick and Jane Garrett were appointed to lead a review into the party's campaign. At the time, he publicly requested former prime minister Kevin Rudd to remain in parliament.

In April 2015, Dick announced he would seek preselection for the federal seat of Oxley following the retirement of Bernie Ripoll. He was endorsed unopposed, and retained Oxley for the ALP at the 2016 federal election.

In July 2022, following the ALP's victory at the 2022 federal election, Dick was nominated as the party's candidate for Speaker of the House of Representatives. He was chosen under a factional deal in which the Right faction would choose the Speaker and the Left faction would choose the President of the Senate. He defeated Rob Mitchell, the incumbent second deputy speaker, with the support of the Queensland and New South Wales Right factions.

On the first sitting day of parliament, 26 July, he was elected as Speaker by the House, winning with 96 votes to beat the previous speaker Andrew Wallace, who received 56 votes. In the role, he has been noted for insisting on "safe and respectful" interactions between MPs; a task that political commentator Michelle Grattan has described as "Herculean."

In February 2025, Dick and fellow presiding officer senate president Sue Lines were revealed to have terminated the employment of Secretary of Parliamentary Services, Robert Stefanic. This decision was made in response to allegations levelled against Stefanic following a 2024 raid by the National Anti-Corruption Commission.

== Political positions ==
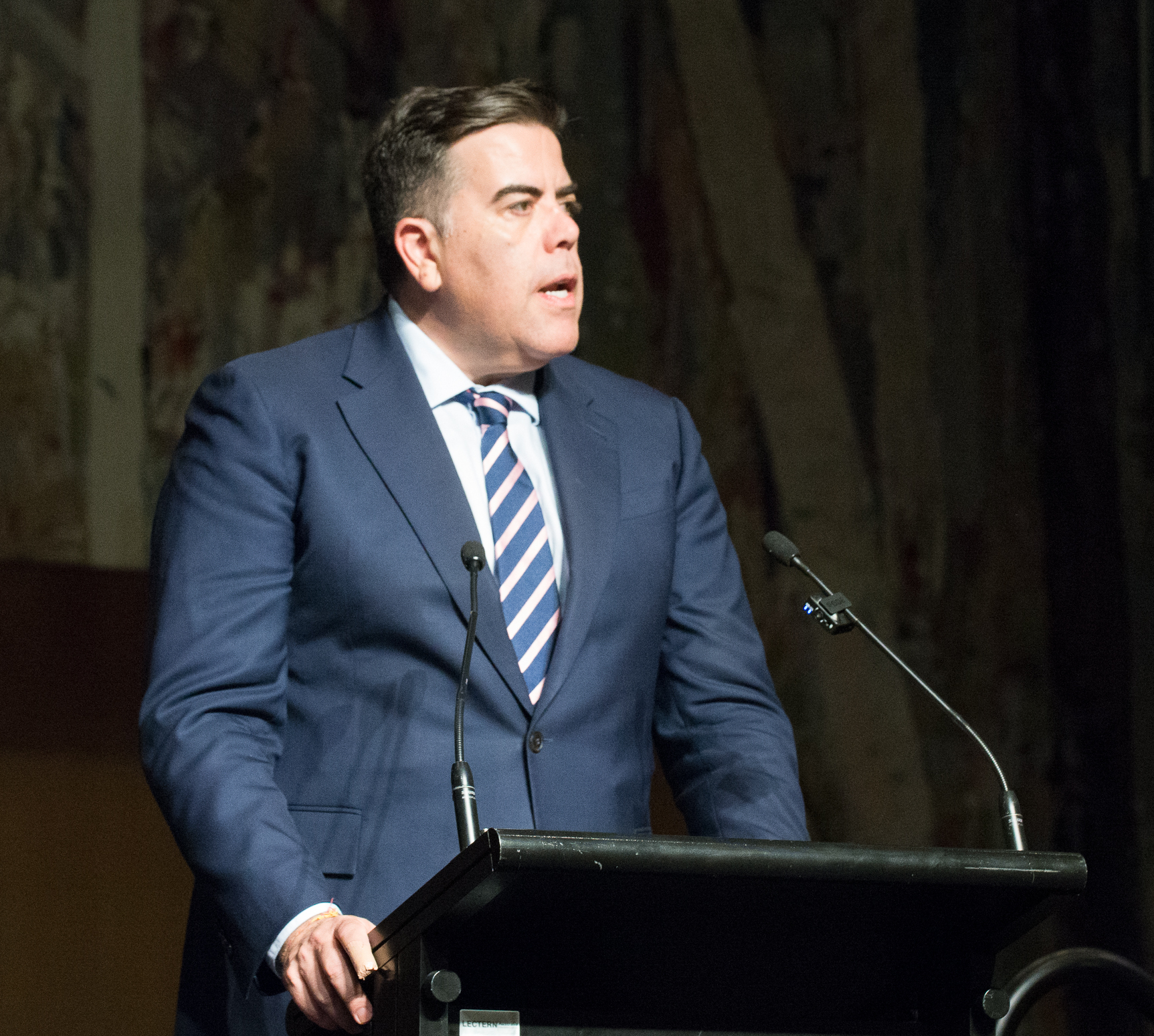
Speaker Milton Dick addressing the 2023 Australian National Prayer Breakfast.

Dick is a member of the Labor Right faction. After the party's defeat at the 2019 election, he stated that the party needed to "take a stronger and firmer view of talking about resources and the benefits they bring to our economy". In August 2019 he was one of four Labor MPs to join the Parliamentary Friends of Coal Exports group established by Liberal MP Craig Kelly.

Dick has been described by the Australian Jewish News as a "strong supporter of Israel". After a sponsored visit to Israel in 2017, he stated that "terms that are often bandied around – like settlements, occupation, apartheid and the wall – these are all easy catchphrases and clichés to use, and often there isn't a counterbalance given to a lot of those arguments".

== Personal life ==
Outside of politics, Dick is an avid supporter of the Brisbane Broncos in the National Rugby League (NRL) and the Brisbane Lions in the Australian Football League (AFL).

He has maintained the Anglican faith of his childhood, and has opposed moves to remove the Lord's Prayer from Parliamentary proceedings.

== See also ==
- Politics of Queensland
- Political families of Australia

Parliament of Australia
Preceded by Bernie Ripoll	Member for Oxley; 2016–present	Incumbent
Preceded by Andrew Wallace	Speaker of the Australian House of Representatives; 2022–present	Incumbent
