= Tim Quinn =

Australian politician (born 1949)

- Quinn in April 2003

14th Lord Mayor of Brisbane
- In office 30 May 2003 – 27 March 2004
- Preceded by: Jim Soorley
- Succeeded by: Campbell Newman

Deputy Lord Mayor of Brisbane
- In office 1 May 1997 – 30 May 2003
- Leader: Jim Soorley

Brisbane City Councillor for Dutton Park Ward
- In office 26 March 1994 – 30 May 2003
- Preceded by: Ward established
- Succeeded by: Helen Abrahams

Brisbane City Councillor for The Gabba Ward
- In office 30 March 1985 – 26 March 1994
- Preceded by: Ward established
- Succeeded by: Ward abolished

Personal details
- Born: Kieron Owen Timothy Quinn; 26 July 1949 (age 77) Ipswich, Queensland, Australia
- Party: Labor

Kieron Owen Timothy Quinn (born 26 July 1949) is a former Australian politician.

Quinn was a teacher who entered local politics in 1985 as the alderman for The Gabba ward at an election the Harvey Labor administration lost. He served in opposition for two terms before rising to civic cabinet in the 1991 Soorley Labor election victory, with Labor achieving an 18% swing against incumbent Lord Mayor Liberal Sallyanne Atkinson.

Quinn took the reins in Civic Cabinet of Development and Planning and continued in this role for the next 12 years, playing an important role during this period of dramatic transformation in Brisbane. Urban Renewal of the inner city commenced, Local Area Plans were established in conjunction with character housing protection provision to retain Brisbane's distinctive "tin and timber' character. Ugly "six pack" units were banned with design guidelines overhauled and Suburban Centre Improvement Schemes were also commenced in 1996 to revitalise traditional local shopping strips and are now widespread throughout the city.

Quinn became Lord Mayor of Brisbane following Lord Mayor Jim Soorley's retirement from politics in 2003 after serving as deputy mayor since 1997.

Quinn, part of the left wing faction of the Labor Party, was subsequently defeated by Campbell Newman in March 2004.

Preceded by Jim Soorley	Lord Mayor of Brisbane; 2003–2004	Succeeded by Campbell Newman
