= 2012 Queensland local elections =

Australian local elections

← 2008	28 April 2012	2016 →

The 2012 Queensland local elections were held on 28 April 2012 to elect the mayors and councils of the 73 local government areas in Queensland, Australia.

== See also ==
- 2012 Brisbane City Council election
- 2012 Gold Coast City Council election
- 2012 Townsville City Council election
