= Campbell Newman =

Premier of Queensland from 2012 to 2015

Major The Honourable Campbell Newman AO
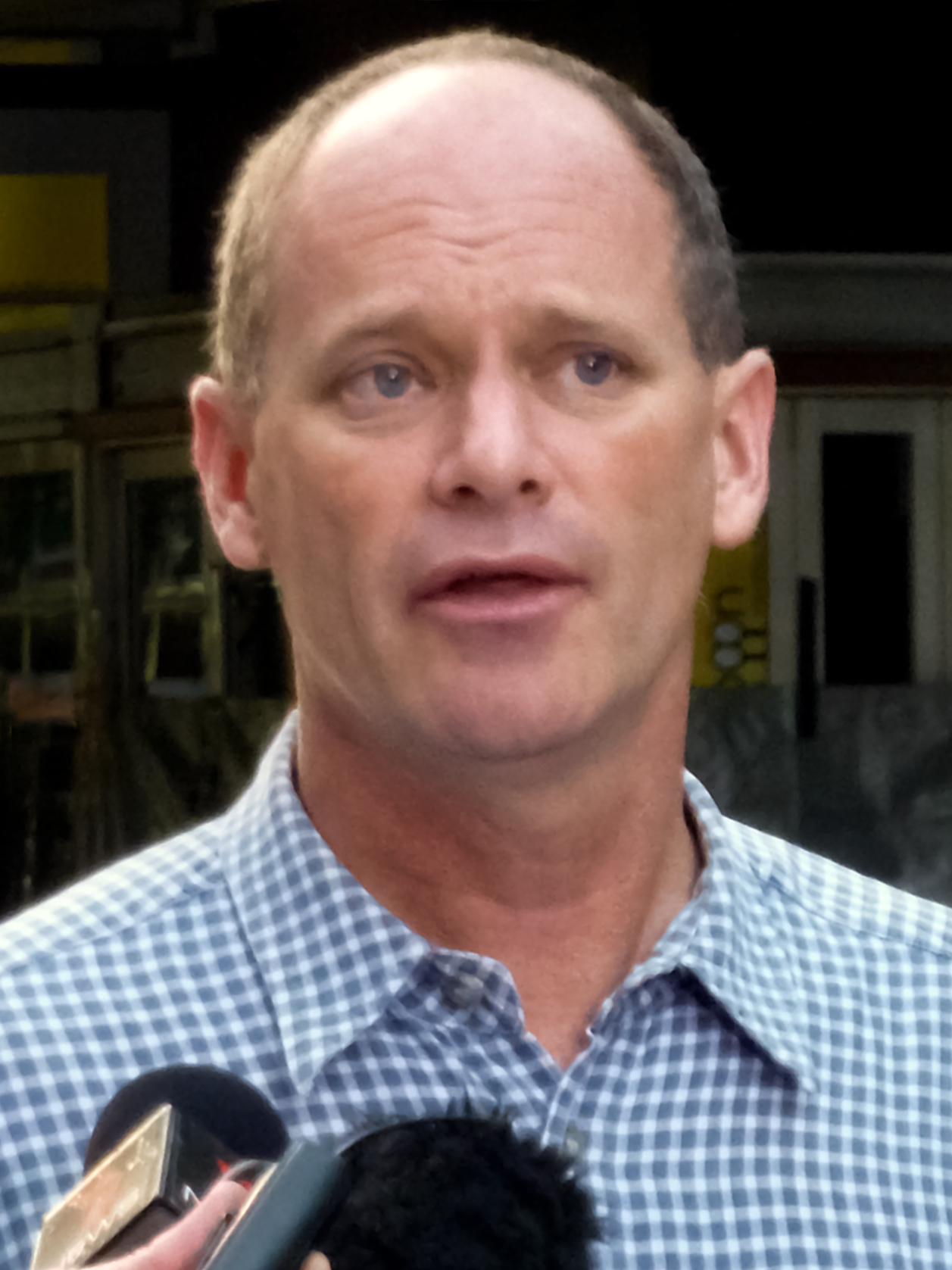
- Newman in 2011

38th Premier of Queensland
- In office 26 March 2012 – 14 February 2015
- Monarch: Elizabeth II
- Governor: Penelope Wensley; Paul de Jersey
- Deputy: Jeff Seeney
- Preceded by: Anna Bligh
- Succeeded by: Annastacia Palaszczuk

Leader of the Liberal National Party
- In office 2 April 2011 – 7 February 2015
- Deputy: Jeff Seeney
- Preceded by: John-Paul Langbroek
- Succeeded by: Lawrence Springborg

Member of the Queensland Parliament for Ashgrove
- In office 24 March 2012 – 31 January 2015
- Preceded by: Kate Jones
- Succeeded by: Kate Jones

15th Lord Mayor of Brisbane
- In office 27 March 2004 – 3 April 2011
- Deputy: David Hinchliffe (2004–2008); Graham Quirk (2008–2011)
- Preceded by: Tim Quinn
- Succeeded by: Graham Quirk

Personal details
- Born: Campbell Kevin Thomas Newman; 12 August 1963 (age 63) Canberra, ACT, Australia
- Party: Libertarian (since 2021)
- Other political affiliations: Liberal Party (2004–2008) Liberal National Party of Queensland (2008–2021)
- Spouse: Lisa Newman (née Monsour)
- Relations: Kevin Newman (father); Jocelyn Newman (mother)
- Children: Rebecca; Sarah
- Education: Royal Military College, Duntroon; University of New South Wales; University of Queensland; Launceston Church Grammar School
- Profession: Civil engineer
- Awards: Australian Defence Medal
- Nickname: Noddy

Military service
- Branch/service: Australian Army
- Years of service: 1981–1993
- Rank: Major
- Unit: Royal Australian Engineers

Campbell Kevin Thomas Newman (born 12 August 1963) is an Australian former politician who served as the 38th Premier of Queensland from 26 March 2012 to 14 February 2015. He served as the member for Ashgrove in the Legislative Assembly of Queensland between 24 March 2012 and 31 January 2015. He was Liberal National Party of Queensland (LNP) Leader from 2 April 2011 to 7 February 2015; Newman previously served as the 15th Lord Mayor of Brisbane from 27 March 2004 to 3 April 2011.

Newman was elected to the lord mayorship as a member of the Liberal Party. He became a member of the LNP following the July 2008 merger of the Queensland Liberals and the Nationals. In March 2011, Newman announced that he would challenge opposition leader John-Paul Langbroek for the LNP leadership. Langbroek resigned, and Newman was elected his successor. As Newman was not a member of the Legislative Assembly, former state Nationals leader Jeff Seeney was elected interim opposition leader while Newman headed the party's election team from outside the legislature.

Newman led the LNP in the 2012 state election, winning 78 of 89 seats from a 44-seat two-party swing, a record for Queensland. At the same time, he was elected to the seat of Ashgrove in western Brisbane. He was sworn in as premier two days later, becoming the first Brisbane-based non-Labor premier in 97 years. At the 2015 state election, the Newman-led LNP suffered a 14-point two-party swing, resulting in a hung parliament; of 89 seats, Labor won 44 seats and the statewide two-party vote while the LNP were reduced to 42 seats. Newman himself lost his own seat to his Labor predecessor, Kate Jones. On 10 February 2015, Newman submitted his resignation and he was replaced as premier by Annastacia Palaszczuk four days later as Labor formed a minority government.

In July 2021, Newman resigned from the LNP, and in August 2021 announced he had joined the Liberal Democrats and would be standing as the party's lead Senate candidate in Queensland at the 2022 Australian federal election. Newman was the first premier of Queensland from the LNP.

== Early life and military career ==
Campbell Newman was born on 12 August 1963 in Canberra, to parents who later both represented Tasmania in the federal parliament and were both ministers in Liberal–National coalition governments. His father, Kevin, represented the federal seat of Bass from 1975 to 1984, and was a minister in the Fraser government. His mother, Jocelyn Newman (née Mullett), was a Senator for Tasmania (1986–2002) and a minister in the Howard government. Campbell Newman was raised in Tasmania, attending Launceston Church Grammar School, then returned to Canberra.

He joined the Australian Army as a staff cadet at the Royal Military College, Duntroon in 1981, graduating as a lieutenant in 1985. He spent 13 years in the army, resigning in 1993 with the rank of major. He has an honours degree in civil engineering from the University of New South Wales.

He moved to Queensland, where he graduated with an MBA from the University of Queensland, then worked as a consultant for PA Consulting Group, and subsequently for the agricultural storage company Grainco, before deciding to stand for election as lord mayor of Brisbane.

== Lord Mayor of Brisbane ==
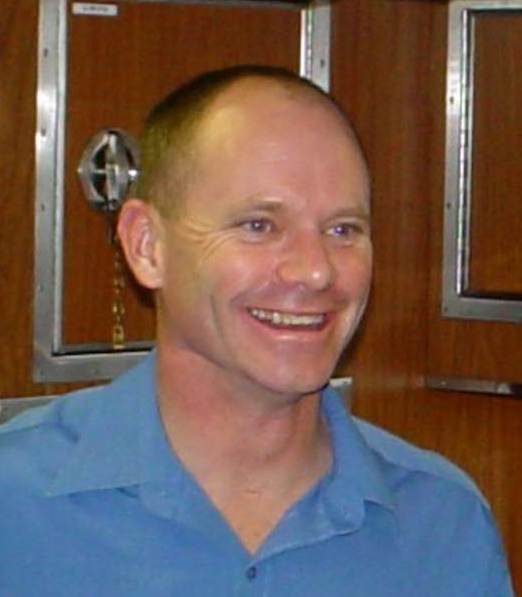
Newman in 2008

In the 2004 election, Newman narrowly defeated Labor incumbent Tim Quinn. However, a majority of wards returned Labor councillors, meaning Newman had to work with a Labor-dominated civic cabinet and a Labor deputy mayor.

The most significant infrastructure item initiated or delivered during this first term was the TransApex package of bridge, traffic and tunnel projects.

In the 2008 election, Newman was re-elected and the Liberals took control of the council by taking five wards from Labor.

Newman was selected as one of 25 mayors from across the world shortlisted for the 2010 World Mayor Prize, an online competition aimed at raising the profile of civic leaders. When the results were announced, Newman was declared the fifth-best mayor in the world.

== State-level politics ==
=== Election to parliament ===
On 18 March 2011, Nine News Queensland's Spencer Jolly reported that the LNP's organisational wing was engineering a plan to make Newman the leader of the LNP. According to Jolly, party president Bruce McIver was trying to arrange for Bruce Flegg, the former leader of the Queensland Liberals and the MP for Moggill, the only safe LNP seat in Brisbane at the time, to resign and hand his seat to Newman. Under this plan, once Newman was safely in the legislature, he would have challenged Opposition Leader John-Paul Langbroek—who, like Newman, is from the Liberal side of the LNP merger—for the leadership of the LNP. Newman subsequently acknowledged he had been approached about moving up to state politics. Although he did not rule out running in the next state election he stated that, for the time being, he was committed to serving out his term as lord mayor and running for re-election in 2012.

However, on 22 March, Newman announced that he was seeking the LNP preselection for the west Brisbane seat of Ashgrove, held by Labor's Kate Jones, in the election due for 2012. If he won preselection, Newman said, he would then make a bid for the LNP leadership. According to ABC News, the LNP's organisational wing wanted Newman to run for a state seat and the leadership when polls showed he was the only non-Labor politician who matched Premier Anna Bligh's popularity during the 2010–11 Queensland floods.

Jones held Ashgrove with a margin of 7.1 points, making it a "fairly safe" Labor seat, on paper. However, according to Australian Broadcasting Corporation elections analyst Antony Green, Newman carried The Gap ward, which contains the bulk of Ashgrove (Brisbane City Council wards are almost as large as state electorates), with 56 per cent of the two-party vote in 2004 and almost 70 per cent in 2008. According to Green, if Newman repeated his past performance in The Gap, he would be able to take Ashgrove off Labor.

Within hours of Newman's announcement, Langbroek and deputy leader Lawrence Springborg both resigned their posts. Langbroek had been under growing pressure from the LNP's organisational wing to stand down after Labor's polling numbers rebounded in the wake of the floods. However, as late as a day before Newman's announcement, Langbroek insisted he would not do so. On 2 April 2011, Newman was elected as the leader of the LNP. The next day he won the LNP preselection for Ashgrove, unopposed.

Normal practice in a Westminster system would have called for an LNP member of parliament from a safe seat to resign so that Newman could enter parliament via a by-election. However, it became apparent that a by-election could not be arranged. To solve this problem, former state Nationals leader Jeff Seeney, who had been elected deputy leader of the LNP, was named as the party's interim parliamentary leader—and hence Leader of the Opposition—while Newman led the LNP election team from outside the legislature. Seeney agreed to cede the post of parliamentary leader to Newman should Newman win election to the legislature. Newman's ascent to the role of leader outside of Parliament led Bligh to briefly consider breaking her previous vow to let the legislature run full-term. She had promised to focus exclusively on recovery in 2011, but was concerned that the LNP's leadership situation could make the co-operation necessary for the recovery effort impossible. Bligh also accused Newman of "abandoning" the lord mayor's post, saying that Newman should not have "cut and run" while the recovery effort was still underway.

The first Newspoll taken after Newman assumed the leadership showed that the LNP had regained the lead in opinion polling; it had led most polls from July until the floods. Newman had also consistently led Bligh as preferred premier.

Soon after Newman became leader of the LNP, Labor state treasurer Andrew Fraser used parliamentary privilege to claim he had received information from within the LNP that Flegg had been given an inducement to resign and allow Newman to run for his seat in a by-election. On 18 July 2011, the Crime and Misconduct Commission announced that the investigation found no evidence to support Fraser's allegations and all parties were cleared. Billionaire and LNP benefactor Clive Palmer said the "CMC [was] colluding with the government" while the LNP accused Fraser of "knowing too much about the investigation".

Newman made it clear that when he took over the LNP leadership, all policies previously announced would be scrapped and essentially become "null and void" with new policy announcements to be made. In an attempt to win voter support in regional Queensland, Newman's first official LNP policy announcement was that he would not support daylight saving in Queensland or South East Queensland, even though as Brisbane's Lord Mayor he had been a vocal advocate for daylight saving.

Newman stated his support for same-sex marriage. The LNP, however, stated prior to the 2012 election that if they win government they may move to repeal such laws.

On 30 May 2021, Newman was made one of the LNP's trustees, a party elder position that is involved in finances and has a seat on the state executive. It is understood that the acting LNP President, Cynthia Hardy, approached Newman about the role, to which he was then elected in a vote of state executive.

=== Election victory ===
On 25 January 2012, Bligh announced that a state election would be held in Queensland on 24 March, but that she would not formally ask the Governor to dissolve parliament until 19 February. For Newman to unseat Bligh as premier, he needed not only to win Ashgrove, but also lead the LNP to at least an 11-seat gain. However, the LNP were unbackable favourites to win the election; as mentioned above they had been leading in opinion polling for all but a few months since July 2011.

On 15 March 2012, Bligh referred to the Crime and Misconduct Commission material concerning an office in a building owned by interests associated with Newman's family. Despite allegations of inappropriate dealings for personal benefit, a week before the election the CMC finalised its assessment that there was no evidence of official misconduct by Newman while he was Lord Mayor of Brisbane. Consequently, no further investigation was warranted nor would be conducted by the CMC concerning Newman.

In the election, Newman led the LNP to a comprehensive victory. The LNP won 78 seats against only seven for Labor, taking 44 seats on a swing of 14.5 points. That was largely because Brisbane, Labor's power base for more than 20 years, swung over dramatically to support Newman. The LNP won an unprecedented 37 seats in Brisbane, in many cases on swings of 10 points or more. By comparison, it had gone into the election holding only six of the capital's 40 seats; Labor had held power mostly on the strength of winning at least 30 seats there in every election since 1989. It was easily the worst defeat a sitting government has ever suffered in Queensland, and one of the most lopsided election results ever recorded at the state level in Australia. Newman himself won a convincing victory in Ashgrove, taking 51 per cent of the primary vote and 54 per cent of the two-party vote on a swing of 13.8 points—almost double the swing needed.

Newman formally claimed victory at 8:45 pm Queensland time, saying he had received a mandate to make Queensland "a can-do place once more." The LNP had run on the slogan "Can Do Queensland" (stylised as "CanDoQLD")—derived from his mayoral campaign slogan, "Can Do Campbell".

== Premier ==
=== Newman government ===
Normal practice in Australia calls for a defeated government to stay in office on a caretaker basis until the final results are in. However, the day after the election, with the LNP's victory beyond doubt even though counting was still under way in several seats, Bligh announced she was resigning as premier and retiring from politics. An hour later, Newman announced that he intended to advise Governor Penny Wensley that he was able to form a government. He also announced that he intended to have himself and his top two shadow ministers, Seeney and Tim Nicholls, sworn in as an interim three-man government until a full ministry could be named, with Seeney as deputy premier and Nicholls as treasurer. Newman was formally sworn in as Queensland's 38th premier on 26 March. His interim government remained in office until the full ministry was sworn in a week later. Upon swearing-in, he became the first non-Labor premier from the Brisbane area, as well as the first non-interim premier aligned federally with the Liberals (or their predecessors) since Digby Denham left office in 1915. The last Liberal premier of Queensland, Gordon Chalk, served as a caretaker between the death of Jack Pizzey in 1968 and the election of Joh Bjelke-Petersen later that year. He is also the first person since Federation to lead a party to victory while not himself serving in the legislature at the time of the election. Newman entered office with the largest majority government in Queensland history, and percentage-wise the largest legislative majority in any Australian state or federal election in history at the time. He announced that he would focus on rebuilding Queensland's economy and setting its finances in order. He also asked his large party room to put together plans to "deliver their promises" in their own seats.

On 29 March, Newman announced his support for newly elected Labor leader Annastacia Palaszczuk's proposal to extend the parliamentary term in Queensland to four years, as is the case in the other states. He also promised that Labor would have the full rights and privileges entitled to the Official Opposition, even though at the time it was two seats short of official status in the legislature (Labor subsequently took two seats off the LNP in by-elections). In January 2013, Newman announced plans to push for Queensland to allow optional preferential voting in federal elections.

=== Privatisation ===
Newman's government supported privatisation and the sale of state assets.

=== Law and order ===
In September 2013, Newman announced that bootcamps for convicted young people will open in Townsville and Rockhampton by September 2013, along with two other camps. These bootcamps closed in 2015 under the Labor government.

In October 2013 the Newman government passed new legislation which handed discretionary powers to the state Attorney-General to indefinitely extend the detention of sex offenders. The legislation was criticised by the Law Society of Queensland, the Bar Association of Queensland, the Australian Council for Civil Liberties and retired judges. Newman responded by describing opponents of the law as "apologists for sex offenders and paedophiles". In addition to targeting sex offenders, other legislation aims to imprison members and associates of "outlaw motorcycle clubs", naming 26 clubs. The bill attracted a large amount of criticism from law professionals and Amnesty International. In particular, the bill was criticised by Amnesty International for sweeping so broadly that innocent conduct may be caught and infringing the right to be presumed innocent until proven guilty, although Newman claimed that Queenslanders wanted the tough new laws.

By September 2013, Newman's government had cut 12,282 public service jobs in Queensland.

On 7 April 2014, the NSW Independent Commission Against Corruption heard that Newman wanted $5,000 to meet Sydney businessman Nick Di Girolamo when he was the Lord Mayor of Brisbane.

On 21 July 2014, Newman was forced to withdraw a very small part of the controversial biker laws following a landslide defeat in a by-election in the seat of Stafford (itself following a huge swing and loss for the government in a by-election in the seat of Redcliffe) and rapidly decaying public approval across the state. The government also promised to reinstate bipartisan support and the previous parliamentary estimates.

=== 2015 election ===
On 5 January 2015, media organisations reported that Newman intended to announce the election date the next day. On 6 January, Newman confirmed on Twitter that he had visited acting governor Tim Carmody and writs had been issued for an election on 31 January. During the election campaign there was speculation that Newman, sitting on a two-party margin of 5.7 points in his seat of Ashgrove, was at risk of losing his own seat, drawing into question his ability to remain as Premier even if the LNP won another term.

At the election Newman lost Ashgrove to his Labor predecessor, Kate Jones, on a swing of nearly 10 points. With his defeat in Ashgrove beyond doubt even though counting had not been finalised, Newman announced his retirement from politics on election night. He immediately resigned as both premier and LNP leader, though he remained as caretaker premier for nearly two weeks while the overall result was in doubt. Newman was the second sitting Queensland premier to lose his own seat, the first being Digby Denham. Ultimately, in a shock result, Labor came up just one seat short of the 36-seat swing it needed to win back government in its own right, and was able to form a minority government with the support of independent Peter Wellington.

Newman's defeat triggered an unsuccessful party room challenge to then Northern Territory Chief Minister Adam Giles, whose leadership style was reported to be similar to Newman's.

Newman is the only person to have served the entirety of his time in the Queensland Parliament as Premier.

== Attempted move to federal politics ==
A week after his 2015 state election defeat it was revealed that Newman, while still caretaker premier, was approached to stand for Liberal preselection for the federal seat of Indi in Victoria. It was reported that Newman's army background may possibly sit well with the 10 per cent of Australia's army that is stationed in the electorate. However, Newman declined to run for the Indi preselection.

=== 2021 resignation from the LNP ===
Newman announced his resignation from the LNP on 25 July 2021 along with his wife, saying the LNP candidate in the 2021 Stretton state by-election was "let down by a party and leadership that never stands up for anything". Newman hinted at plans to return to politics at a federal level and was yet to decide whether to run in a party or as an independent but said if he did run, it would be for the Australian Senate.

=== Joining the Liberal Democrats ===
On 8 August 2021, Newman announced his candidacy for the federal Senate representing Queensland at the 2022 federal election with the Liberal Democrats. Newman criticised the major parties for the use of "heavy-handed" measures he says are responsible for "the destruction of people's livelihoods, jobs and freedoms" during the COVID-19 pandemic. Newman was not elected to the Senate.

== Political views ==
Newman describes himself as a libertarian.

Newman supports same-sex marriage.

== Personal life and family ==
Newman lives in Brisbane with his wife Lisa. They have two daughters. In February 2020, in an online interview, Campbell Newman described his political philosophy as being libertarian. Campbell and Lisa Newman announced their resignations from the LNP on 25 July 2021.

== See also ==
- 2015 Queensland state election
- Political families of Australia

Political offices
Preceded by Anna Bligh	Premier of Queensland; 2012–2015	Succeeded by Annastacia Palaszczuk
Civic offices
Preceded by Tim Quinn	Lord Mayor of Brisbane; 2004–2011	Succeeded by Graham Quirk
Party political offices
Preceded by John-Paul Langbroek	Leader of the Liberal National Party of Queensland; 2011–2015; Served alongside: Jeff Seeney until 2012	Succeeded by Lawrence Springborg
Parliament of Queensland
Preceded by Kate Jones	Member for Ashgrove; 2012–2015	Succeeded by Kate Jones
