= Maureen Hayes =

Maureen Agnes Hayes was a Brisbane City Counciller for 15 years until she retired following a redistribution of her ward, Grange Ward, into two adjoining wards.

During her first twelve months, she was the Chairperson of Council. She was later elected to the position of Chairperson of Transport and Traffic Projects and she was Deputy Mayor of Brisbane from May 2003 until March 2004. As Chairperson of Transport and Major Projects Committee, Hayes oversaw the development of the public transport system. Initiatives included gas buses, CityCats and bikes on buses. She also oversaw construction of the Inner City Bypass, a major upgrade of the S1 sewer and large road projects such as Waterworks Road and Coronation Drive and was a champion for the Green Bridge.

Hayes was elected as Chairperson of Finance Committee in March 2004. At this time she stopped being Chairperson of Transport and Major Projects Committee. She held the position of Finance Chairperson until July 2004. She is also a member of the Green Bridge and North South Bypass Tunnel Executive Group. She was a member of the Labor Party.
