= Forest Lake Ward =

Electoral ward of Brisbane, Australia

Forest Lake Ward Queensland — Brisbane City Council
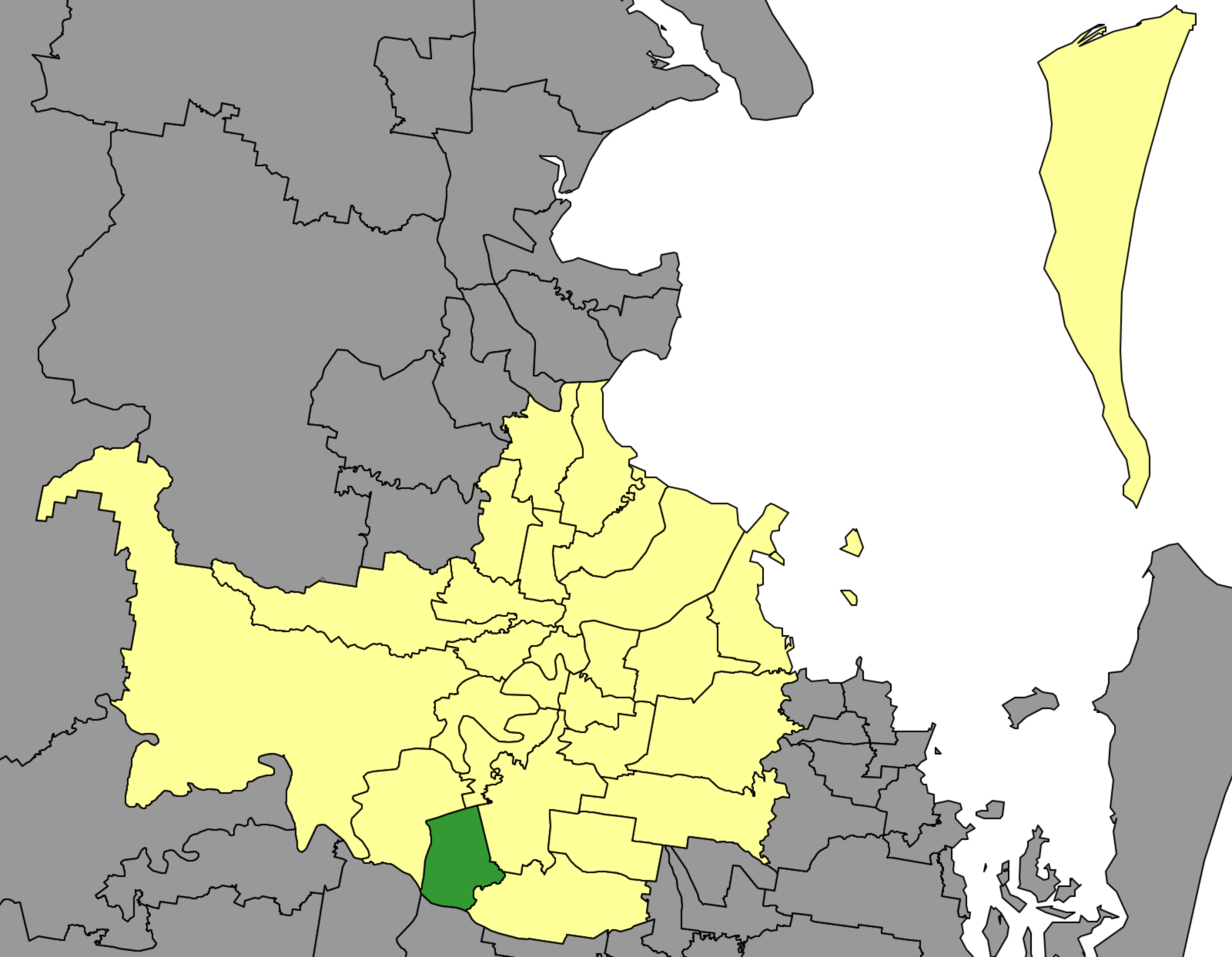
- Created: 2015
- Councillor: Charles Strunk
- Party: Labor
- Namesake: Forest Lake
- Electors: 34,192 (2024)
- Demographic: Outer-metropolitan

Forest Lake Ward is a Brisbane City Council ward covering Doolandella, Inala, Richlands, and parts of Forest Lake and Durack. It was created in 2015 to replace Richlands Ward ahead of the 2016 election.

== Councillors for Forest Lake Ward ==
Image	Member	Party	Term	Notes
	Charles Strunk	Labor	19 March 2016 – present	Incumbent

== Results ==
=== 2024 ===
2024 Queensland local elections: Forest Lake Ward
Party	Candidate	Votes	%	±%
Labor	Charles Strunk	10,654	39.71	−13.09
Liberal National	Kylie Gates	9,237	34.43	+3.53
Greens	Vi Phuong Nguyen	6,941	25.87	+9.57
Total formal votes		26,832	97.35	
Informal votes		731	2.65	
Turnout		27,563	80.61	
Two-party-preferred result
Labor	Charles Strunk	12,800	55.33	−8.07
Liberal National	Kylie Gates	10,333	44.67	+8.07
Labor hold		Swing	−8.07	

=== 2020 ===
2020 Queensland local elections: Forest Lake Ward
Party	Candidate	Votes	%	±%
Labor	Charles Strunk	12,667	52.8	+3.6
Liberal National	Roger Hooper	7,399	30.8	−9.8
Greens	Jenny Mulkearns	3,920	16.3	+6.2
Total formal votes		23,986		
Informal votes		1,044		
Turnout		25,030		
Two-party-preferred result
Labor	Charles Strunk	13,971	63.4	+7.9
Liberal National	Roger Hooper	8,072	36.6	−7.9
Labor hold		Swing	+7.9	

=== 2016 ===
2016 Queensland local elections: Forest Lake Ward
Party	Candidate	Votes	%	±%
Labor	Charles Strunk	11,553	49.2	−6.2
Liberal National	Leanne McFarlane	9,560	40.7	−4
Greens	Jenny Mulkearns	2,386	10.2	+10.2
Total formal votes		23,499	-	−
Informal votes		962	-	−
Turnout		24,461	-	−
Two-party-preferred result
Labor	Charles Strunk	12,235	55.3	0
Liberal National	Leanne McFarlane	9,886	44.7	0
Labor hold		Swing	0	
