= Graham Quirk =

Australian politician (born c.1958)

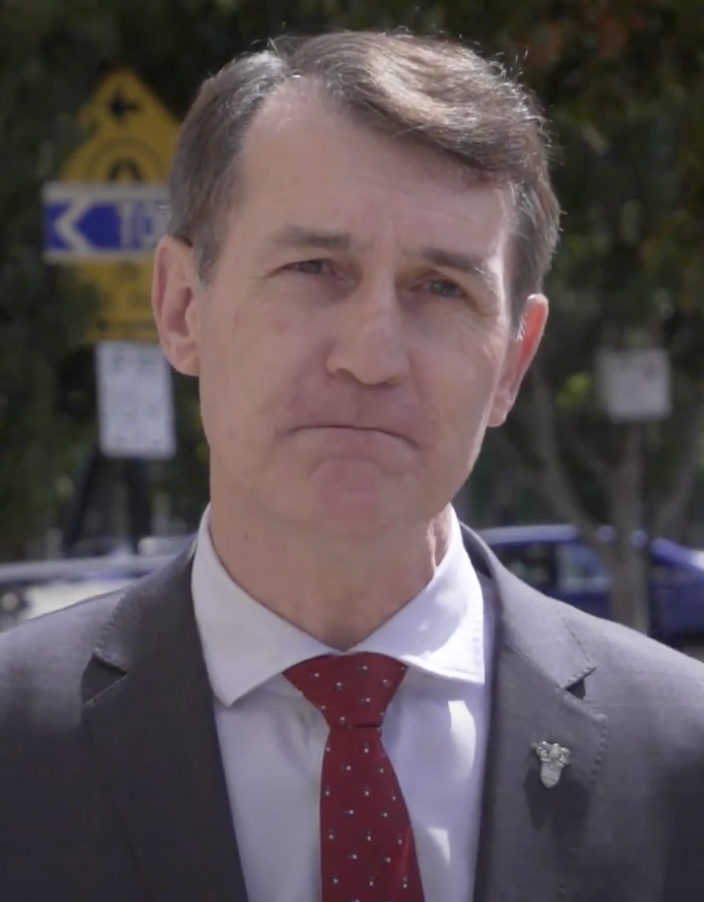
- Quirk in February 2019

16th Lord Mayor of Brisbane
- In office 7 April 2011 – 8 April 2019
- Deputy: Adrian Schrinner
- Preceded by: Campbell Newman
- Succeeded by: Adrian Schrinner

Deputy Lord Mayor of Brisbane
- In office 16 March 2008 – 7 April 2011
- Leader: Campbell Newman
- Succeeded by: Adrian Schrinner
- Constituency: MacGregor Ward

Leader of the Opposition of Brisbane City Council
- In office 18 April 2004 – 16 March 2008
- Succeeded by: Shayne Sutton
- Constituency: Wishart Ward

Personal details
- Born: Graham Michael Quirk c. 1958
- Party: Liberal National Party of Queensland (2008–present)
- Other political affiliations: Liberal Party (until 2008)
- Spouse: Anne Quirk
- Children: 3

Graham Michael Quirk (born c. 1958) is a former Australian politician who served as the 16th Lord Mayor of Brisbane. From 2008 until 2011, he was Deputy Lord Mayor under Campbell Newman, succeeding the latter when Newman stepped down to prepare to contest the 2012 Queensland State Election, at which he was elected as the Premier of Queensland. Quirk served as a Councillor in the City of Brisbane since 1985. Quirk is a member of the Liberal National Party of Queensland, affiliated federally with the Liberal Party of Australia.

Quirk was elected as Lord Mayor in his own right in a landslide at the 2012 Brisbane City Council election, winning 68.3% of the TPP mayoral vote and 18 of the 26 local wards. The Liberal National's increased their representation at the 2016 Brisbane City Council election to 19 wards, albeit with a smaller margin in the mayoral race with Quirk winning 59.3% of the TPP vote.

== Political career ==
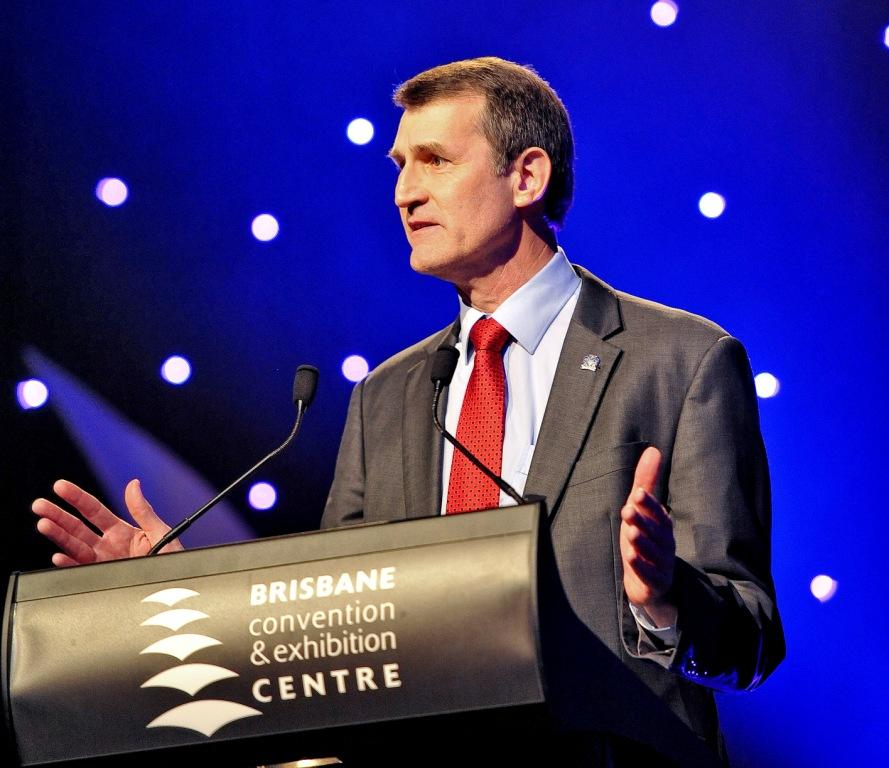
Quirk in 2011

Quirk, an alumnus of St James College, entered Brisbane City Council when elected as Councillor for Rochedale Ward in 1985, aged 27. After three years he was appointed the city's Finance Chairman under Lord Mayor Sallyanne Atkinson and was later appointed Works Chairman. He then served as Opposition Spokesman on Development and Planning, Opposition Spokesman on Finance and Opposition Spokesman on Transport and Traffic.

He served as Deputy Opposition Leader and was Opposition Leader at the time of Campbell Newman's election as Lord Mayor in 2004. Quirk was elected as Deputy Liberal Leader to Campbell Newman and was appointed to the role of Chairman of Transport and Major Projects (later known as Roads, TransApex and Traffic). In this role he administered one-third of the council's total budget expenditure for the implementation of TransApex, the road network and traffic management.

In 2008 the LNP gained a majority of councillors and Quirk took on the roles of Deputy Mayor and Chairman of the Infrastructure Committee. Following Newman's departure from Lord Mayorship to enter state politics, Quirk was appointed the new Lord Mayor of Brisbane City.

On 28 April 2012, Quirk won a four-year term as mayor in his own right at the Brisbane City Council elections. He won a second full term in 2016.

In March 2019 Quirk announced his retirement from Council, his deputy Adrian Schrinner was subsequently elected his successor.

In December 2019, federal Infrastructure Minister Michael McCormack appointed Quirk to the board of Infrastructure Australia, which provides advice to government and industry on Australia’s infrastructure policy and projects.

== Personal life ==
Quirk is married to wife Anne. They have three daughters, with the eldest having cerebral palsy.
