= 2016 Brisbane City Council election =

- 19 March 2016
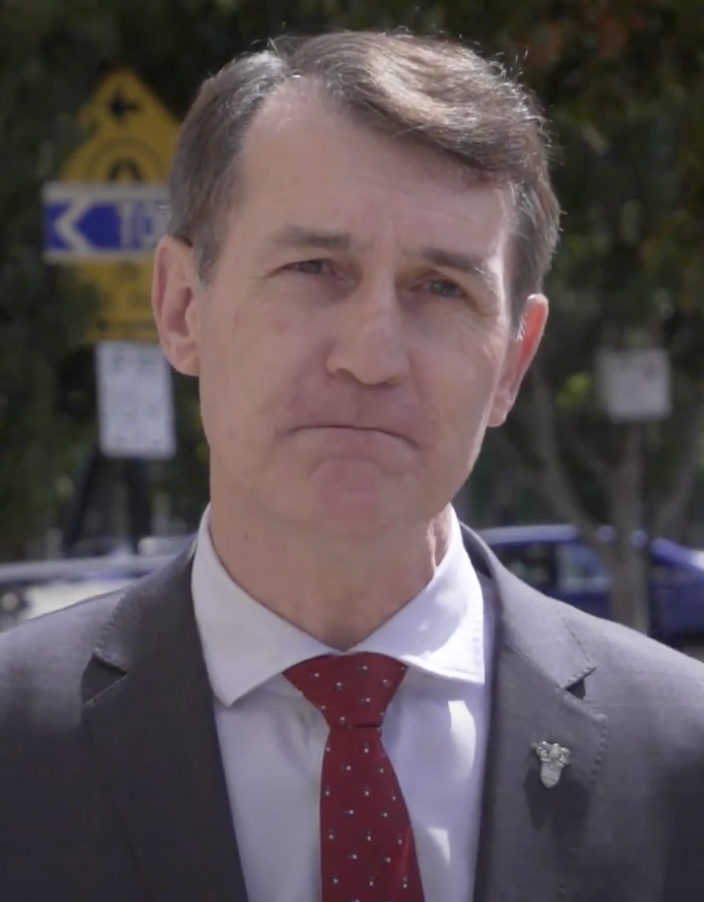

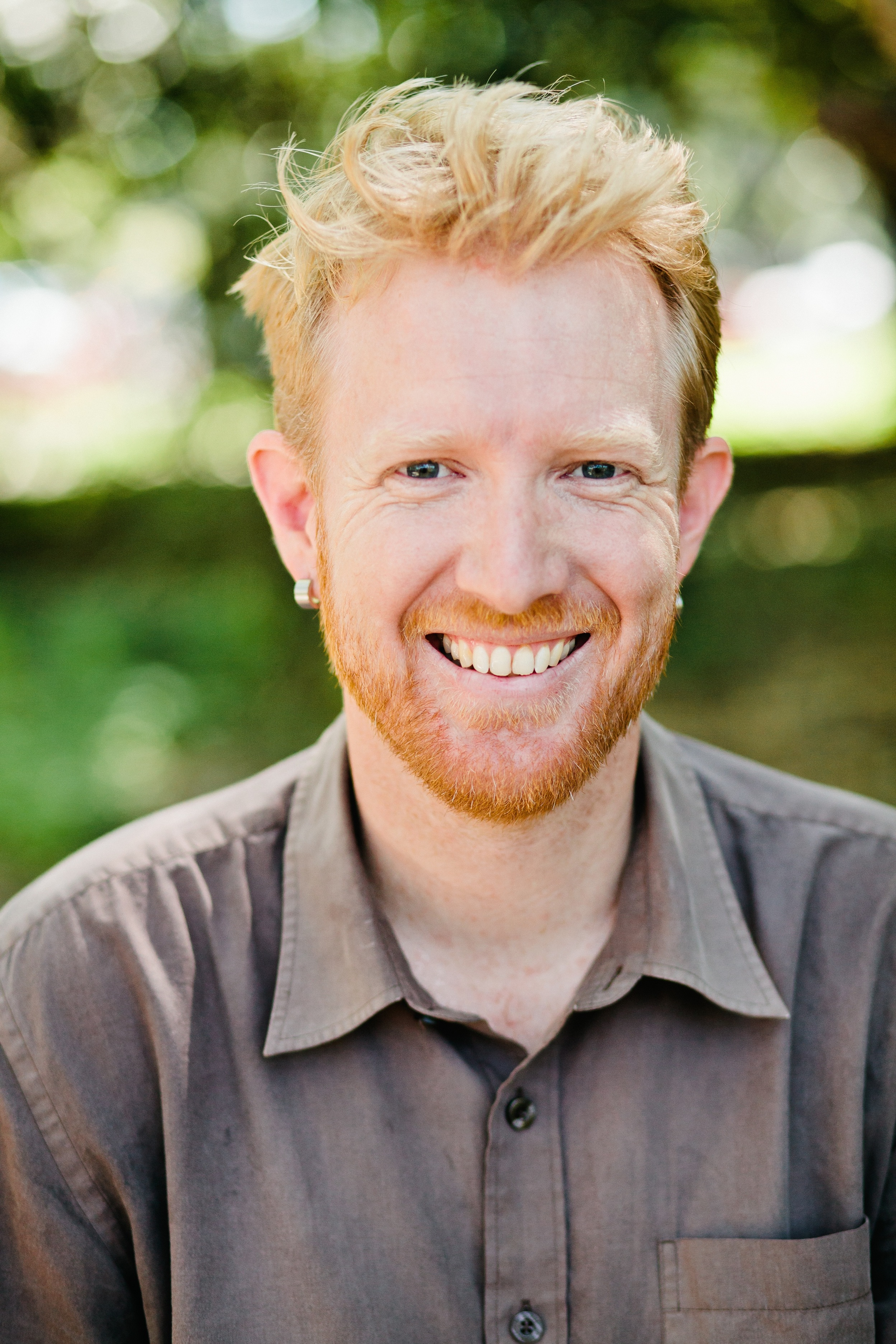
| | First party | Second party | Third party |
|---|---|---|---|
| Candidate | Graham Quirk | Rod Harding | Ben Pennings |
| Party | Liberal National | Labor | Greens |
| Popular vote | 325,714 | 195,055 | 63,483 |
| Percentage | 53.4% | 32.0% | 10.4% |
| Swing | ▼8.6pp | ▲6.8pp | ▼0.3pp |
| TPP | 59.3% | 40.7% |
| TPP swing | ▼9.2pp | ▲9.2pp |
Lord Mayor of Brisbane before election
Graham Quirk
Liberal National
Subsequent Lord Mayor
Graham Quirk
Liberal National
- All 26 wards on the City Council; 13 wards needed for a majority
| Party | Leader | Vote % | Seats | +/– |
|---|---|---|---|---|
| Liberal National | Graham Quirk | 49.88 | 19 | +1 |
| Labor | Rod Harding | 33.22 | 5 | −2 |
| Greens | Ben Pennings | 14.49 | 1 | +1 |
| Independents | — | 2.42 | 1 | 0 |
This lists parties that won seats. See the complete results below.
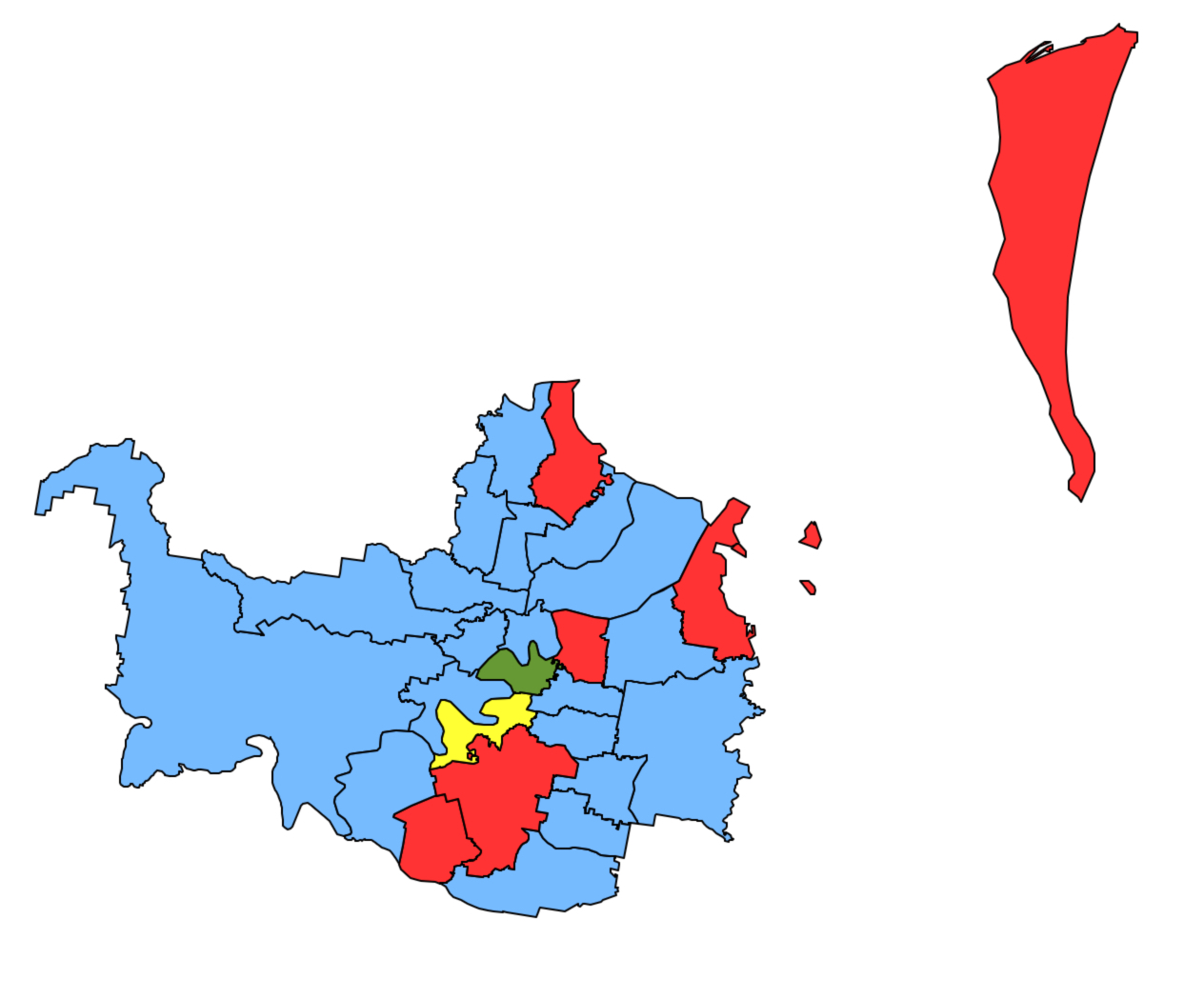
Results by ward

The 2016 Brisbane City Council election was held on 19 March 2016 to elect a lord mayor and 26 councillors to the City of Brisbane. The election was held as part of the statewide local government elections in Queensland, Australia.

The election resulted in the re-election of the Liberal National Party to a majority in the chamber, with incumbent LNP Lord Mayor Graham Quirk also being returned. The Liberal Nationals increased their representation by one ward to a total of 19 of 26. The Lord Mayoral result of 59.3% of the two-party-preferred vote for Quirk was a reduction from the 69.5% result at the previous election.

The main opposition party, the Labor Party was reduced to 5 wards, its lowest number in over a decade.

The Queensland Greens won their first ward in this election, with Jonathan Sri being elected in The Gabba Ward.

== Results ==
=== Mayor ===
2016 Queensland mayoral elections: Brisbane
| Party | Candidate | Votes | % | ±% |
|---|---|---|---|---|
| Liberal National | Graham Quirk | 325,714 | 53.38 | −8.56 |
| Labor | Rod Harding | 195,055 | 31.96 | +6.80 |
| Greens | Ben Pennings | 63,483 | 10.40 | −0.30 |
| Consumer Rights | Jeffrey Hodges | 12,960 | 2.12 | +2.12 |
| People Decide | Karel Boele | 5,195 | 0.85 | +0.85 |
| Independent | Jim Eldridge | 4,764 | 0.78 | +0.78 |
| Independent | Jarrod Wirth | 3,063 | 0.50 | +0.50 |
| Total formal votes | | 610,234 | | |
| Informal votes | | 15,287 | | |
| Turnout | | 625,521 | | |
Two-party-preferred result
| Liberal National | Graham Quirk | 336,450 | 59.31 | −9.19 |
| Labor | Rod Harding | 230,841 | 40.69 | +9.19 |
| Liberal National hold | | Swing | | |

Lord Mayoral popular vote
| LNP | 53.4% |
| Labor | 32.0% |
| Greens | 10.4% |
| Other | 4.2% |

=== Councillors ===
2016 Queensland local elections: Brisbane
| Party | Votes | % | Swing | Seats | Change |
|---|---|---|---|---|---|
| Liberal National | 303,055 | 49.88 | −7.2 | 19 | ▲1 |
| Labor | 201,835 | 33.22 | +1.2 | 5 | ▼2 |
| Greens | 88,008 | 14.49 | +6.0 | 1 | ▲1 |
| Independent | 13,522 | 2.22 | −0.20 | 1 | Steady |
| People Decide | 1,155 | 0.19 | +0.19 | 0 | Steady |
| Formal votes | 607,575 | | | | |

Ward popular vote
| LNP | 49.88% |
| Labor | 33.22% |
| Greens | 14.49% |
| IND | 2.42% |

Council Wards
| LNP | 73.07% |
| Labor | 19.23% |
| Greens | 3.84% |
| Other | 3.84% |

=== Ward summary ===
| Ward | Party | Councillor | Margin (%) |
|---|---|---|---|
| Bracken Ridge | LNP | Amanda Cooper | 10.6 |
| Calamvale | LNP | Angela Owen-Taylor | 14.7 |
| Central | LNP | Vicki Howard | 8.2 |
| Chandler | LNP | Adrian Schrinner | 24.6 |
| Coorparoo | LNP | Ian McKenzie | 3.0 |
| Deagon | Labor | Jared Cassidy | 3.7 |
| Doboy | LNP | Ryan Murphy | 4.3 |
| Enoggera | LNP | Andrew Wines | 4.8 |
| Forest Lake | Labor | Charles Strunk | 5.3 |
| Hamilton | LNP | David McLachlan | 17.6 |
| Holland Park | LNP | Krista Adams | 4.8 |
| Jamboree | LNP | Matthew Bourke | 19.1 |
| MacGregor | LNP | Steven Huang | 13.7 |
| Marchant | LNP | Fiona King | 8.3 |
| McDowall | LNP | Norm Wyndham | 15.2 |
| Moorooka | Labor | Steve Griffiths | 13.7 |
| Morningside | Labor | Shayne Sutton | 6.6 |
| Northgate | LNP | Adam Allan | 1.7 |
| Paddington | LNP | Peter Matic | 5.8 |
| Pullenvale | LNP | Kate Richards | 18.1 |
| Runcorn | LNP | Kim Marx | 8.0 |
| Tennyson | Independent | Nicole Johnston | 26.3 |
| The Gabba | Greens | Jonathan Sri | 5.0 |
| The Gap | LNP | Steven Toomey | 5.7 |
| Walter Taylor | LNP | Julian Simmonds | 16.5 |
| Wynnum Manly | Labor | Peter Cumming | 11.6 |
