= Holland Park Ward =

Brisbane City Council ward

Holland Park Ward Queensland — Brisbane City Council
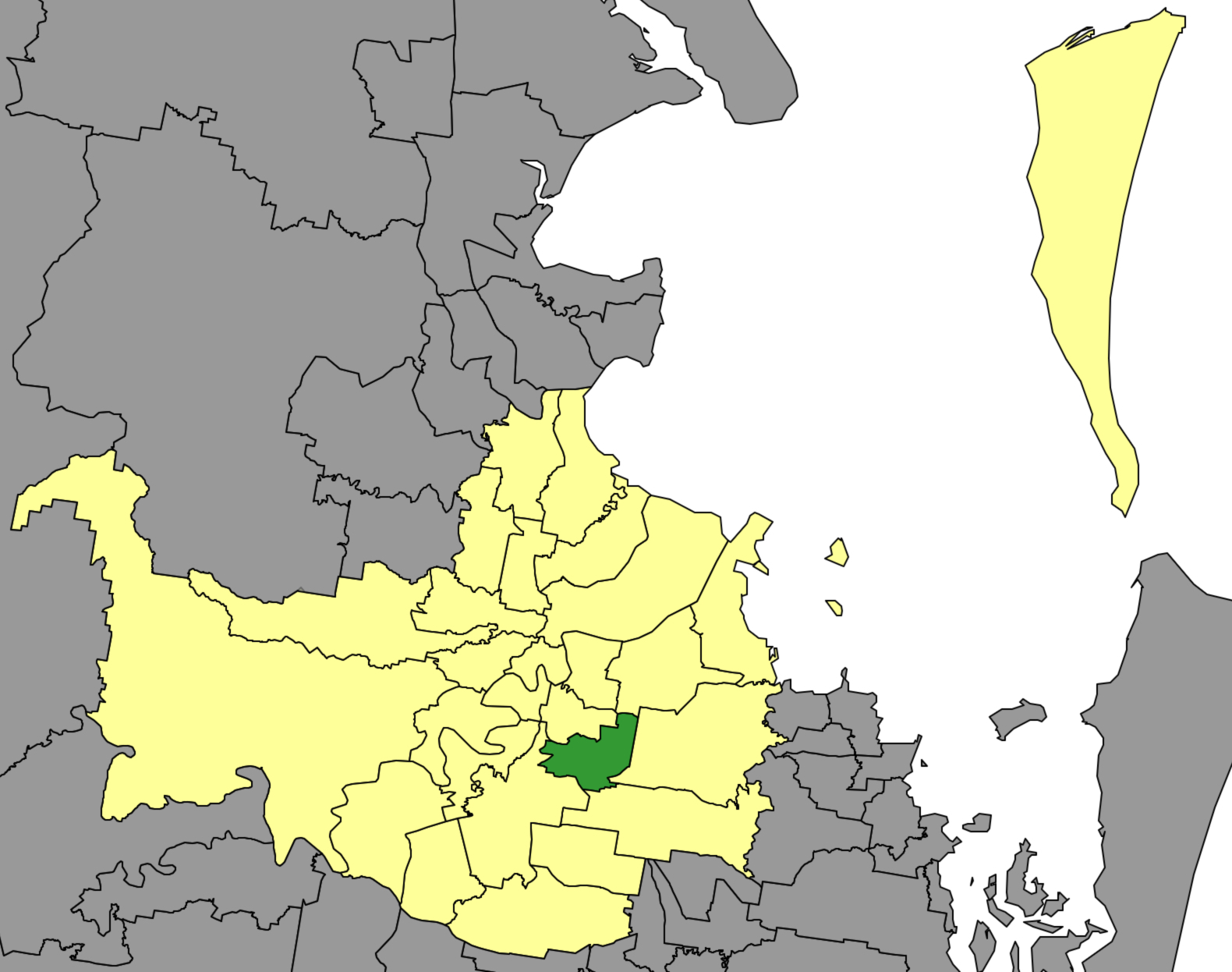
- Created: 1985
- Councillor: Krista Adams
- Party: Liberal National
- Namesake: Holland Park
- Electors: 32,242 (2024)
- Demographic: Inner-metropolitan

Holland Park Ward is a Brisbane City Council ward covering Holland Park, Holland Park West, Mt Gravatt, Mt Gravatt East and Tarragindi.

== History ==
Holland Park was the ward of Brisbane's only ever known Indigenous councillor, Robbie Williams. Williams, a Yugambeh man and Labor councillor, filled the vacancy caused by Kerry Rea's resignation in October 2007. In December that year, he died of a heart attack. The seat remained vacant until the election in March 2008.

== Councillors for Holland Park Ward ==
Image	Member	Party	Term	Notes
	Gail Chiconi	Liberal	1985 – 1997	
	Kerry Rea	Labor	1997 – October 2007	Councillor for Ekibin Ward from 1991–1997. Resigned to run for Bonner at 2007 federal election
	Robbie Williams	Labor	October 2007 – 20 December 2007	Died in office. Had been preselected by Labor to contest Wishart Ward at the 2008 election
	Ian McKenzie	Liberal	15 March 2008 – 26 July 2008	Moved to Coorparoo Ward
	Ian McKenzie	Liberal National	26 July 2008 – 19 March 2016	Moved to Coorparoo Ward
	Krista Adams	Liberal National	19 March 2016 – present	Councillor for Wishart Ward from 2008–2016. Incumbent

== Results ==
=== 2024 ===
2024 Queensland local elections: Holland Park Ward
Party	Candidate	Votes	%	±%
Liberal National	Krista Adams	13,121	47.76	−0.64
Labor	Shane Warren	7,543	27.46	−3.24
Greens	David Ford	6,807	24.78	+3.88
Total formal votes		27,421	98.01	
Informal votes		558	1.99	
Turnout		28,029	86.93	
Two-party-preferred result
Liberal National	Krista Adams	13,794	53.72	−1.08
Labor	Shane Warren	11,882	46.28	+1.08
Liberal National hold		Swing	−1.08	

=== 2020 ===
2020 Queensland local elections: Holland Park Ward
Party	Candidate	Votes	%	±%
Liberal National	Krista Adams	11,553	48.4	−0.8
Labor	Karleigh Auguston	7,323	30.7	−5.5
Greens	Jenny Gamble	4,975	20.9	+6.8
Total formal votes		23,851		
Informal votes		580		
Turnout		24,431		
Two-party-preferred result
Liberal National	Krista Adams	11,992	54.7	+0.3
Labor	Karleigh Auguston	9,924	45.3	−0.3
Liberal National hold		Swing	+0.3	

=== 2016 ===
2016 Queensland local elections: Holland Park Ward
Party	Candidate	Votes	%	±%
Liberal National	Krista Adams	11,476	49.6	−4.1
Labor	Adam Obeid	8,246	35.6	+0.9
Greens	Karen Anderson	3,409	14.7	+3.2
Total formal votes		23,131	-	−
Informal votes		609	-	−
Turnout		23,740	-	−
Two-party-preferred result
Liberal National	Krista Adams	11,897	54.8	−4.0
Labor	Adam Obeid	9,820	45.2	+4.0
Liberal National hold		Swing	−4.0	

=== 2004 ===
2004 Brisbane City Council election: Holland Park Ward
Party	Candidate	Votes	%	±%
Labor	Kerry Rea	11,185	55.58	
Liberal	Ian McKenzie	8,939	44.42	
Total formal votes		20,124	97.74	
Informal votes		465	2.26	
Turnout		20,589	87.69	
Two-party-preferred result
Labor	Kerry Rea	11,185	55.58	
Liberal	Ian McKenzie	8,939	44.42	
Labor hold		Swing		
