= 2016 Queensland local elections =

| ← 2012 | 19 March 2016 (Note: The election in Lockyer Valley was held on 16 April 2016.) | 2020 → |
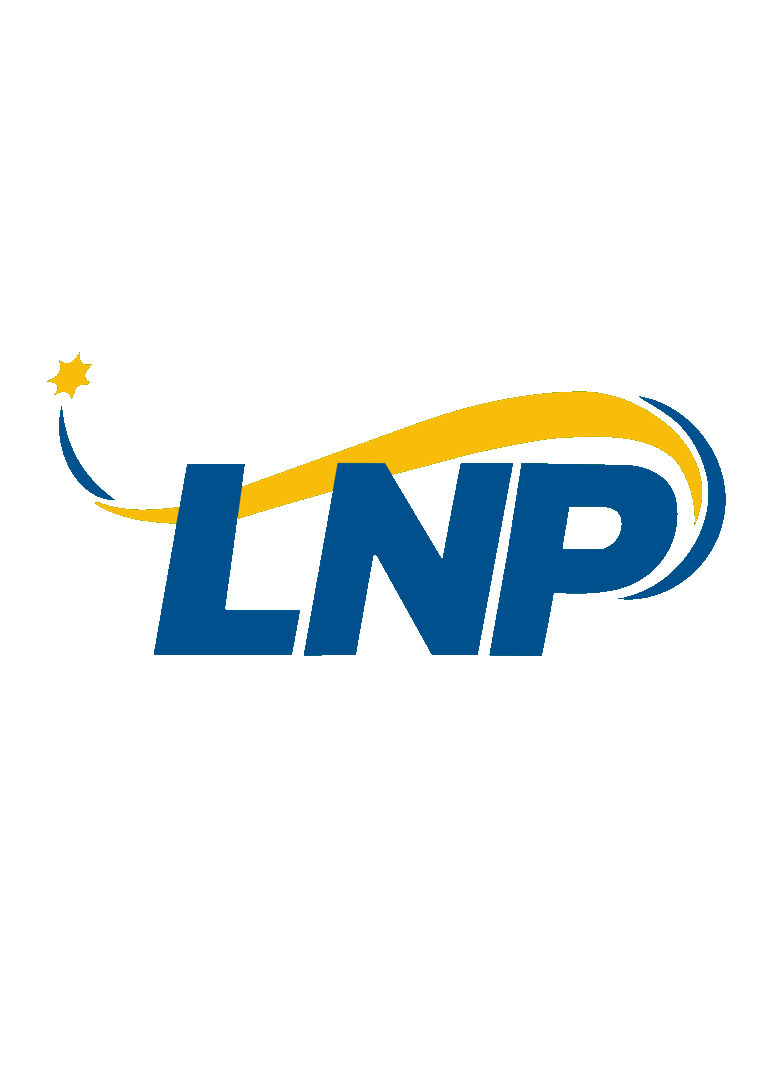

| | First party | Second party | Third party |
|---|---|---|---|
| | IND |
| Leader | N/A | N/A | N/A |
| Party | Independents | Liberal National | Labor |
| Last election | | 18 | 9 |
| Seats before | | 18 | 9 |
| Seats won | | 19 | 7 |
| Seat change | | ▲1 | ▼2 |
| | Fourth party | Fifth party |
| | | PD |
| Leader | No leader | No leader |
| Party | Greens | People Decide |
| Last election | 0 | Did not exist |
| Seats before | 0 | 0 |
| Seats won | 1 | 0 |
| Seat change | ▲1 | Steady |

The 2016 Queensland local elections were held on 19 March 2016 to elect the mayors and councils of the 77 local government areas in Queensland, Australia.

The Queensland Greens had their first-ever local election victory, with Jonathan Sri being elected in The Gabba Ward in Brisbane.

Lockyer Valley mayor Steve Jones died on 20 February 2016 after a brain bleed saw him collapse during a media interview. As a result, the election in that LGA for both mayor and councillors was postponed to 16 April.

== Results ==
=== Council elections ===
| Party | Votes | % | Swing | Seats | Change |
|---|---|---|---|---|---|
| Independents | | | | | |
| Liberal National | | | | 19 | ▲1 |
| Labor | | | | 7 | ▼2 |
| Independent Liberal National | | | | 20 | |
| Independent Labor | | | | 9 | |
| Greens | | | | 1 | ▲1 |
| Team Jenny Hill | | | | | |
| Cairns Unity | | | | | |
| Team COGHLAN | | | | | |
| Team McCulloch | | | | | |
| Locals United - Back to Basics | | | | 0 | |
| People Decide | | | | 0 | Steady |
| Total (Note: Most local councils are undivided, meaning the total number of votes is greater than the total number of ballots. This row lists the number of ballots.) | | | | | |
| Registered voters / turnout | | | | | |

== See also ==
- 2016 Brisbane City Council election
- 2016 Gold Coast City Council election
- 2016 Townsville City Council election
