= Shayne Sutton =

Leader of the Opposition of Brisbane City Council
- In office 16 March 2008 – 1 May 2012
- Succeeded by: Milton Dick

Brisbane City Councillor for Morningside Ward
- In office 16 March 2004 – 2 November 2017
- Preceded by: Sharon Humphreys
- Succeeded by: Kara Cook

Personal details
- Party: Labor Party
- Education: Griffith University

Shayne Maree Sutton is a Labor Party politician. She served as the Councillor for the Morningside Ward in the Brisbane City Council in Queensland, Australia, from 2004 until her resignation in 2017, and was Brisbane City Council Leader of the Opposition from 2008 to 2012. She holds a Bachelor of Arts (majoring in Political Science and Public Administration) and a Bachelor of Commerce with Honours from Griffith University.

Elected in 2004 at the age of 25, Shayne was the youngest woman ever to be elected to Brisbane City Council. She is currently the Shadow Spokesperson for Finance, Economic Development and Administration and a Member of Council's Neighbourhood Planning and Development Assessment Committee.
