= 2020 Brisbane City Council election =

Election of lord mayor and councillors to Brisbane City Council

- 28 March 2020
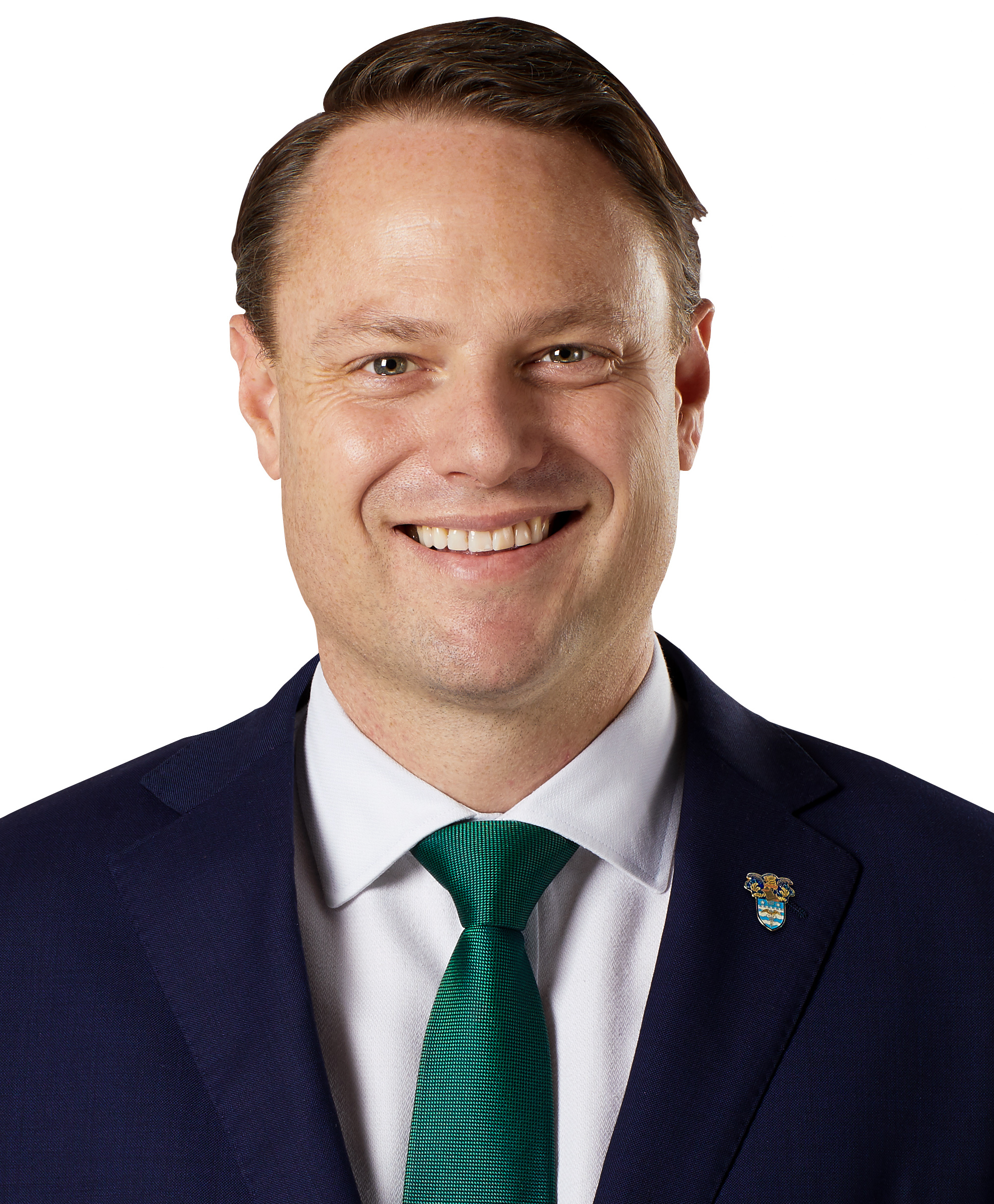

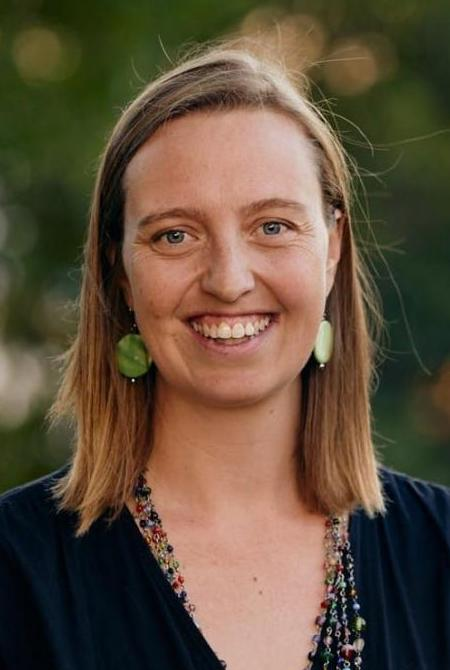
| | First party | Second party | Third party |
|---|---|---|---|
| Candidate | Adrian Schrinner | Pat Condren | Kath Angus |
| Party | Liberal National | Labor | Greens |
| Leader since | 31 March 2019 |
| Popular vote | 292,895 | 189,832 | 94,481 |
| Percentage | 47.7% | 30.9% | 15.4% |
| Swing | ▼5.1pp | ▼1.1pp | ▲5.0pp |
| TPP | 56.3% | 43.7% |
| TPP swing | ▼3.0pp | ▲3.0pp |
Lord Mayor of Brisbane before election
Adrian Schrinner
Liberal National
Subsequent Lord Mayor
Adrian Schrinner
Liberal National
- All 26 wards on the City Council; 13 wards needed for a majority
| Party | Leader | Vote % | Seats | +/– |
|---|---|---|---|---|
| Liberal National | Adrian Schrinner | 45.88 | 19 | 0 |
| Labor | Jared Cassidy | 32.87 | 5 | 0 |
| Greens | Kath Angus | 17.84 | 1 | 0 |
| Independents | — | 3.25 | 1 | 0 |
This lists parties that won seats. See the complete results below.

The 2020 Brisbane City Council election was held on 28 March 2020 to elect a lord mayor and 26 councillors to the City of Brisbane. The election was held as part of the statewide local government elections in Queensland, Australia.

The election resulted in the re-election of the Liberal National Party under Adrian Schrinner as Lord Mayor and the Liberal National Party with a majority council. It was a fourth consecutive landslide for the party.

In the Lord Mayoral election, Adrian Schrinner and the Liberal National Party was declared the winner after defeating Pat Condren and the Labor Party on a two-party-preferred basis - 56.3% to 43.7%.

In the ward elections, there were no changes to the representation of the 26 wards, with the Liberal National Party retaining the 19 wards they previously held, the Labor Party retaining the 5 wards they previously held, along with the Greens and Independents each retaining their single wards.

== Pendulum ==
Liberal National wards (19)
Marginal
| Doboy | Lisa Atwood | LNP | 0.03% |
| Northgate | Adam Allan | LNP | 1.6% |
| Coorparoo | Fiona Cunningham | LNP | 3.1% |
| Holland Park | Krista Adams | LNP | 4.4% |
| The Gap | Steven Toomey | LNP | 4.7% |
| Enoggera | Andrew Wines | LNP | 5.0% |
| Paddington | Peter Matic | LNP | 5.8% v GRN |
Fairly safe
| Marchant | Fiona Hammond | LNP | 7.9% |
| Central | Vicki Howard | LNP | 8.2% |
| Runcorn | Kim Marx | LNP | 8.6% |
Safe
| Bracken Ridge | Sandy Landers | LNP | 10.6% |
| Calamvale | Angela Owen | LNP | 14.7% |
| MacGregor | Steven Huang | LNP | 14.9% |
| McDowall | Tracy Davis | LNP | 15.2% |
| Walter Taylor | James Mackay | LNP | 15.7% v GRN |
Very safe
| Jamboree | Sarah Hutton | LNP | 18.0% |
| Pullenvale | Greg Adermann | LNP | 18.1% v GRN |
| Chandler | Ryan Murphy | LNP | 18.3% |
| Hamilton | David McLachlan | LNP | 20.5% |
Labor wards (5)
Marginal
| Deagon | Jared Cassidy | ALP | 2.9% |
| Forest Lake | Charles Strunk | ALP | 5.4% |
| Morningside | Kara Cook | ALP | 5.9% |
Safe
| Wynnum Manly | Peter Cumming | ALP | 11.7% |
| Moorooka | Steve Griffiths | ALP | 14.5% |
Crossbench wards (2)
Fairly safe
| The Gabba | Jonathan Sri | GRN | 12.0% v LNP |
Very safe
| Tennyson | Nicole Johnston | IND | 23.7% v LNP |

== Results ==
=== Mayor ===
First-preference results map by ward

Two-candidate-preferred results map by ward

2020 Queensland mayoral elections: Brisbane
| Party | Candidate | Votes | % | ±% |
|---|---|---|---|---|
| Liberal National | Adrian Schrinner | 292,895 | 47.74 | −5.64 |
| Labor | Pat Condren | 189,832 | 30.94 | −1.02 |
| Greens | Kath Angus | 94,481 | 15.40 | +5.0 |
| Animal Justice | Karagh-Mae Kelly | 19,022 | 3.10 | +3.10 |
| Civil Liberties & Motorists | Jeff Hodges | 5,502 | 0.90 | −1.20 |
| Independent | Frank Jordan | 4,008 | 0.65 | +0.65 |
| Independent | John Dobinson | 3,461 | 0.56 | +0.56 |
| Independent | Ben Gorringe | 2,270 | 0.37 | +0.37 |
| Independent | Jarrod Wirth | 2,065 | 0.34 | −0.16 |
| Total formal votes | | 613,536 | | |
| Informal votes | | 16,425 | | |
| Turnout | | 629,961 | | |
Two-party-preferred result
| Liberal National | Adrian Schrinner | 306,905 | 56.32 | −2.99 |
| Labor | Pat Condren | 237,988 | 43.68 | +2.99 |
| Liberal National hold | | Swing | −2.99 | |

Lord Mayoral popular vote
| LNP | 47.7% |
| Labor | 30.9% |
| Greens | 15.4% |
| Others | 6.0% |

Ward popular vote
| LNP | 45.9% |
| Labor | 32.9% |
| Greens | 17.8% |
| Others | 3.4% |

Council Wards
| LNP | 73.1% |
| Labor | 19.2% |
| Greens | 3.8% |
| Others | 3.8% |

=== Wards ===
First-preference results map by ward

Two-candidate-preferred results map by ward

2020 Queensland local elections: Brisbane
| Party | Votes | % | Swing | Seats | Change |
|---|---|---|---|---|---|
| Liberal National | 279,793 | 45.9 | −3.9 | 19 | Steady |
| Labor | 200,428 | 32.9 | −0.3 | 5 | Steady |
| Greens | 108,759 | 17.8 | +3.3 | 1 | Steady |
| Independent | 19,790 | 3.2 | +1.2 | 1 | Steady |
| Motorists | 586 | 0.1 | +0.1 | 0 | Steady |
| Animal Justice | 428 | 0.1 | +0.1 | 0 | Steady |

| Party | Wards (Total 26 Wards) |
|---|---|
| Liberal National | 19 |
| Labor | 5 |
| Greens | 1 |
| Independent | 1 |

Ward totals
| Ward | Party | Councillor | Two-party-preferred results | | | | | |
| Ward | Party | Councillor | Party | Candidate | % | Result | Margin | Swing |
|---|---|---|---|---|---|---|---|---|
| Bracken Ridge | LNP | Sandy Landers | LNP | Sandy Landers | 54.2 | LNP hold | 4.2 | -6.4 |
| Bracken Ridge | LNP | Sandy Landers | Labor | Cath Palmer | 45.8 | LNP hold | 4.2 | -6.4 |
| Calamvale | LNP | Angela Owen | LNP | Angela Owen | 52.2 | LNP hold | 2.2 | -12.1 |
| Calamvale | LNP | Angela Owen | Labor | James Martin | 47.8 | LNP hold | 2.2 | -12.1 |
| Central | LNP | Vicki Howard | LNP | Vicki Howard | 57.8 | LNP hold | 7.8 | -0.4 |
| Central | LNP | Vicki Howard | Greens | Trina Massey | 42.2 | LNP hold | 7.8 | -0.4 |
| Chandler | LNP | Ryan Murphy | LNP | Ryan Murphy | 68.3 | LNP hold | 18.3 | -3.8 |
| Chandler | LNP | Ryan Murphy | Labor | Penny O'Neill | 31.7 | LNP hold | 18.3 | -3.8 |
| Coorparoo | LNP | Fiona Cunningham | LNP | Fiona Cunningham | 55.7 | LNP hold | 5.7 | +2.6 |
| Coorparoo | LNP | Fiona Cunningham | Greens | Sally Dillon | 44.3 | LNP hold | 5.7 | +2.6 |
| Deagon | Labor | Jared Cassidy | Labor | Jared Cassidy | 61.5 | Labor hold | 11.5 | +8.6 |
| Deagon | Labor | Jared Cassidy | LNP | Kimberley Washington | 38.5 | Labor hold | 11.5 | +8.6 |
| Doboy | LNP | Lisa Atwood | LNP | Lisa Atwood | 54.7 | LNP hold | 4.7 | +9.6 |
| Doboy | LNP | Lisa Atwood | Labor | Jo Culshaw | 45.3 | LNP hold | 4.7 | +9.6 |
| Enoggera | LNP | Andrew Wines | LNP | Andrew Wines | 51.8 | LNP hold | 1.8 | -3.2 |
| Enoggera | LNP | Andrew Wines | Labor | Jonty Bush | 48.2 | LNP hold | 1.8 | -3.2 |
| Forest Lake | Labor | Charles Strunk | Labor | Charles Strunk | 63.4 | Labor hold | 13.4 | +7.9 |
| Forest Lake | Labor | Charles Strunk | LNP | Roger Hooper | 36.6 | Labor hold | 13.4 | +7.9 |
| Hamilton | LNP | David McLachlan | LNP | David McLachlan | 70.5 | LNP hold | 20.5 | +0.6 |
| Hamilton | LNP | David McLachlan | Labor | Leah Malzard | 29.5 | LNP hold | 20.5 | +0.6 |
| Holland Park | LNP | Krista Adams | LNP | Krista Adams | 54.7 | LNP hold | 4.7 | +0.3 |
| Holland Park | LNP | Krista Adams | Labor | Karleigh Auguston | 45.3 | LNP hold | 4.7 | +0.3 |
| Jamboree | LNP | Sarah Hutton | LNP | Sarah Hutton | 59.3 | LNP hold | 9.3 | -8.7 |
| Jamboree | LNP | Sarah Hutton | Labor | Rachel Hoppe | 40.7 | LNP hold | 9.3 | -8.7 |
| MacGregor | LNP | Steven Huang | LNP | Steven Huang | 64.1 | LNP hold | 14.1 | -0.8 |
| MacGregor | LNP | Steven Huang | Labor | Trent McTiernan | 35.9 | LNP hold | 14.1 | -0.8 |
| Marchant | LNP | Fiona Hammond | LNP | Fiona Hammond | 55.0 | LNP hold | 5.0 | -2.9 |
| Marchant | LNP | Fiona Hammond | Labor | Susan Lynch | 45.0 | LNP hold | 5.0 | -2.9 |
| McDowall | LNP | Tracy Davis | LNP | Tracy Davis | 63.5 | LNP hold | 13.5 | -1.7 |
| McDowall | LNP | Tracy Davis | Labor | Liam Culverhouse | 36.5 | LNP hold | 13.5 | -1.7 |
| Moorooka | Labor | Steve Griffiths | Labor | Steve Griffiths | 69.5 | Labor hold | 19.5 | +5.0 |
| Moorooka | Labor | Steve Griffiths | LNP | Warren Craze | 30.5 | Labor hold | 19.5 | +5.0 |
| Morningside | Labor | Kara Cook | Labor | Kara Cook | 59.7 | Labor hold | 9.7 | +3.8 |
| Morningside | Labor | Kara Cook | LNP | Toby Moore | 40.3 | Labor hold | 9.7 | +3.8 |
| Northgate | LNP | Adam Allan | LNP | Adam Allan | 51.9 | LNP hold | 1.9 | +0.3 |
| Northgate | LNP | Adam Allan | Labor | Reg Neil | 48.1 | LNP hold | 1.9 | +0.3 |
| Paddington | LNP | Peter Matic | LNP | Peter Matic | 50.7 | LNP hold | 0.7 | -5.1 |
| Paddington | LNP | Peter Matic | Greens | Donna Burns | 49.3 | LNP hold | 0.7 | -5.1 |
| Pullenvale | LNP | Greg Adermann | LNP | Greg Adermann | 59.9 | LNP hold | 9.9 | -8.2 |
| Pullenvale | LNP | Greg Adermann | Greens | Charles Druckmann | 40.1 | LNP hold | 9.9 | -8.2 |
| Runcorn | LNP | Kim Marx | LNP | Kim Marx | 58.3 | LNP hold | 8.3 | -0.3 |
| Runcorn | LNP | Kim Marx | Labor | John Prescott | 41.7 | LNP hold | 8.3 | -0.3 |
| Tennyson | Independent | Nicole Johnston | Independent | Nicole Johnston | 73.4 | Independent hold | 23.4 | +0.4 |
| Tennyson | Independent | Nicole Johnston | LNP | Maurice Lane | 26.6 | Independent hold | 23.4 | +0.4 |
| The Gabba | Greens | Jonathan Sri | Greens | Jonathan Sri | 62.3 | Greens hold | 12.3 | +5.3 |
| The Gabba | Greens | Jonathan Sri | LNP | Nathaniel Jones | 37.7 | Greens hold | 12.3 | +5.3 |
| The Gap | LNP | Steven Toomey | LNP | Steven Toomey | 57.1 | LNP hold | 7.1 | +2.4 |
| The Gap | LNP | Steven Toomey | Labor | Daniel Bevis | 42.9 | LNP hold | 7.1 | +2.4 |
| Walter Taylor | LNP | James Mackay | LNP | James Mackay | 53.9 | LNP hold | 3.9 | -11.8 |
| Walter Taylor | LNP | James Mackay | Greens | Michaela Sargent | 46.1 | LNP hold | 3.9 | -11.8 |
| Wynnum Manly | Labor | Peter Cumming | Labor | Peter Cumming | 61.4 | Labor hold | 11.4 | -0.3 |
| Wynnum Manly | Labor | Peter Cumming | LNP | Megan Piccardi | 38.6 | Labor hold | 11.4 | -0.3 |

== See also ==
- 2020 Queensland local elections
- 2020 Gold Coast City Council election
