= Peter Cumming =

Australian former politician

Councillor Peter Cumming

Leader of the Opposition on Brisbane City Council
- In office 4 April 2016 – September 2019
- Preceded by: Milton Dick
- Succeeded by: Jared Cassidy

Leader of the Labor Party on Brisbane City Council
- In office 4 April 2016 – September 2019
- Preceded by: Milton Dick
- Succeeded by: Jared Cassidy

Councillor of the City of Brisbane for Wynnum Manly Ward
- In office 26 March 1994 – 12 May 2023
- Succeeded by: Sara Whitmee

Personal details
- Party: Labor (since 1979)

Peter Cumming is an Australian former politician who served as Leader of the Opposition and leader of the Labor Party on Brisbane City Council from 2016 until 2019.

== Political career ==
Cumming was first elected to council for Wynnum Manly Ward at the 1994 election.

Following the 2016 election, where Labor leader Milton Dick did not recontest his seat, there was speculation that Deagon Ward councillor Jared Cassidy would contest the leadership. However, this did not happen, and Cumming was elected to the role unopposed.

In September 2019, six months before the 2020 Brisbane City Council election, Cumming stepped down as leader and Jared Cassidy took his place.

On 13 January 2023, Cumming was charged with mid-range drink driving after attending a Christmas Eve party. Three months later, he announced he would resign from council.

Cumming officially resigned on 12 May 2023, and was replaced days later by Sara Whitmee.
