= 2024 Brisbane City Council election =

Election of lord mayor and councillors to Brisbane City Council

- 16 March 2024

All 27 seats on Brisbane City Council 14 seats needed for a majority
- Opinion polls
- Registered: 845,501
- Lord Mayor
- Turnout: 85.31%
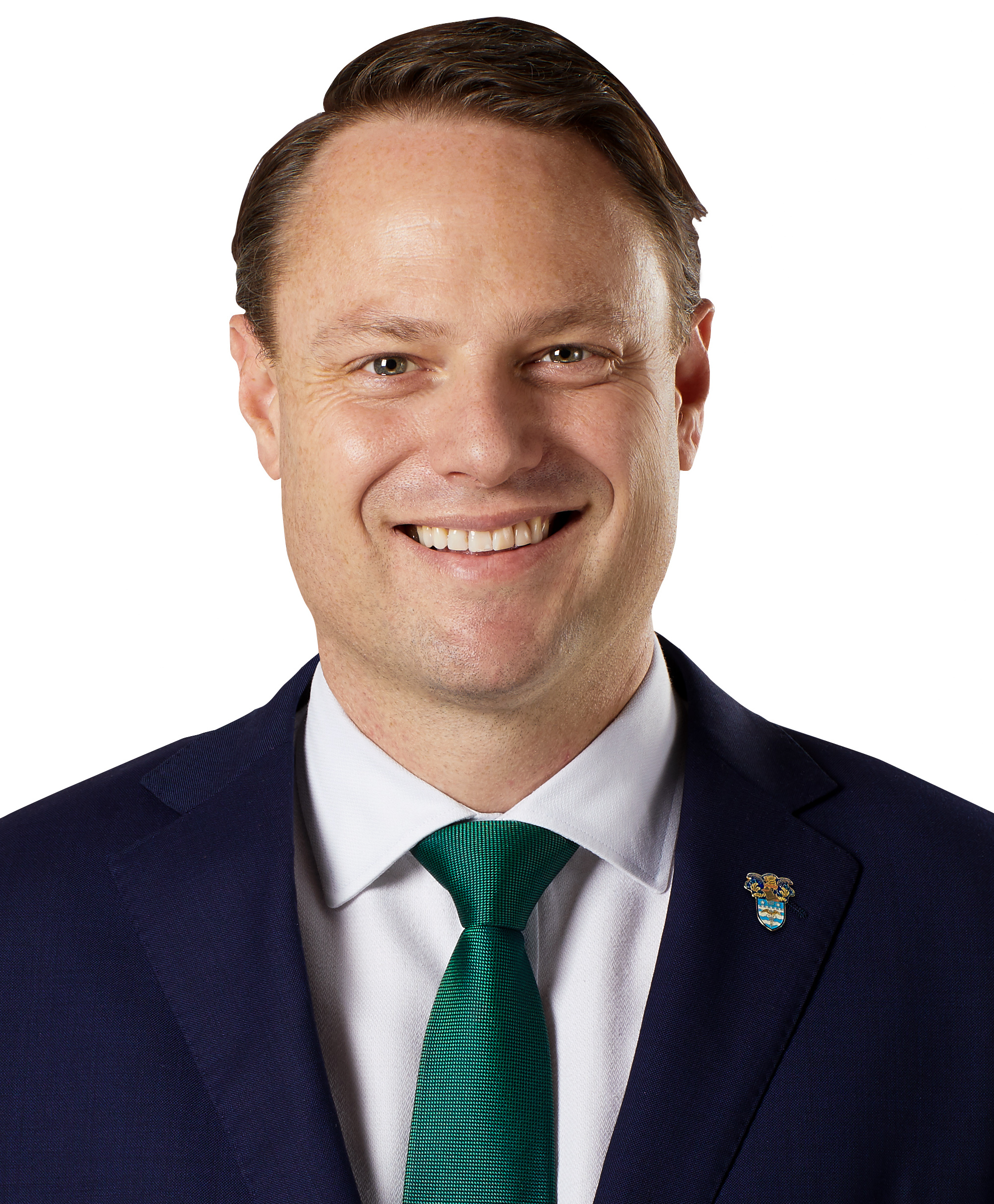

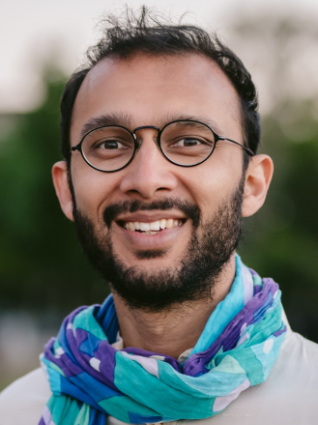
	First party	Second party	Third party
Candidate	Adrian Schrinner	Tracey Price	Jonathan Sriranganathan
Party	Liberal National	Labor	Greens
Primary vote	343,330	186,250	137,454
Percentage	48.59%	26.36%	19.45%
Swing	▲0.85	▼4.58	▲4.05
TPP	56.35%	43.65%
TPP swing	▲0.03	▼0.03
- Results by ward
Lord Mayor before election
Adrian Schrinner
Liberal National
Elected Lord Mayor
Adrian Schrinner
Liberal National
- Councillors
Party	Leader	Vote %	Seats	+/–
Liberal National	Adrian Schrinner	46.89	18	−1
Labor	Tracey Price	26.91	5	0
Greens	Jonathan Sriranganathan	23.15	2	+1
Independent	N/A	3.05	1	0
This lists parties that won seats. See the complete results below.
Results by ward

The 2024 Brisbane City Council election was held on 16 March 2024 to elect a lord mayor and 26 councillors to the City of Brisbane. The election was held as part of the statewide local government elections in Queensland, Australia. Brisbane City Council elections are significant in the scope of Australian local government politics, as the council is the largest in the country by population, area and has the largest economy of any local government area (LGA).

The Liberal National Party has held Brisbane's mayoralty since the election of Campbell Newman at the 2004 election, and a majority of wards since their landslide victory in the 2008 election. The party was led by incumbent Lord Mayor Adrian Schrinner, who succeeded Graham Quirk on 8 April 2019.

The election resulted in the re-election of the Liberal National Party under Adrian Schrinner, leading to a fifth consecutive term with a majority of wards for the party, along with a sixth consecutive mayoral term.

In the lord mayoral election, incumbent Schrinner was opposed by Tracey Price and Jonathan Sriranganathan, for Labor and the Greens respectively, along with a Legalise Cannabis candidate and two Independents. Schrinner was re-elected as Lord Mayor with a two-candidate-preferred result (against Tracey Price) of 56.4% to 43.6%.

In the ward elections, both the LNP and Labor lost ground to the Greens in many wards across the city, with the party successfully gaining the LNP ward of Paddington and gaining primary vote swings of over 10% in multiple other wards. Labor also managed to win Calamvale from the LNP, gaining a Brisbane City Council ward for the first time in the twenty-first century, but significant swings against Labor in all Labor-held wards except Deagon (where the LNP candidate was disendorsed) resulted in the LNP gaining the formerly-safe Labor ward of Wynnum Manly.

Overall, the election resulted in the Liberal National Party's majority reducing to 18 wards, falling for the first time since the 2004 election; Labor maintained a total of 5 wards with the exchange of Wynnum Manly for Calamvale; the Greens position increased to 2 wards with the gain of Paddington; and Nicole Johnson retained Tennyson as an independent.

== Background ==
In April 2023, new legislation passed by the Parliament of Queensland would have an effect on all of Queensland's local government areas (LGAs) in future elections. The bill, Local Government Electoral and Other Legislation (Expenditure Caps) Amendment Bill 2022, sets caps on electoral expenditure for all local governments across the state. The main takeaways vis-à-vis the Brisbane City Council elections are:

- The caps are tiered to take into consideration the number of electors in local government areas
- For Mayoral candidates, caps range from $30,000 in council areas with 30,000 or fewer electors through to $1.3 million for the Brisbane City Council
- Expenditure caps for Councillor candidates range from $15,000 for council areas with 20,000 or fewer electors up to $55,000 for Brisbane City Council wards
- The scheme applies for the seven months prior to a quadrennial election, and from the day a by-election notice is published, through to polling day

=== Mayoral candidates ===
As incumbent Lord Mayor, Adrian Schrinner was the Liberal National candidate, confirming in February 2023 that he would seek re-election.

North Brisbane lawyer and small business owner Tracey Price was announced as the ALP candidate for Lord Mayor of Brisbane on 4 August 2023.

After resigning his seat in March 2023 to give way to another Greens councillor, Jonathan Sriranganathan was confirmed as the Queensland Greens' candidate for Lord Mayor in August 2023.

== Debates and forums ==
P	Participant
A	Absent

=== Lord Mayor ===
Date	Host	Participants					
Date	Host	LNP	ALP	GRN	LCP	TAN	HOL
7 March 2024	Queensland Media Club	P	P	P	A	A	A

== Pendulums ==
=== Pre-Election Pendulum ===
Liberal National wards (19)
Marginal
Paddington	Clare Jenkinson (Note: Jenkinson succeeded Peter Matic as councillor for Paddington in June 2023.)	LNP	0.71% v GRN
Enoggera	Andrew Wines	LNP	1.83%
Northgate	Adam Allan	LNP	1.85%
Calamvale	Angela Owen	LNP	2.24%
Walter Taylor	Penny Wolff (Note: Wolff succeeded James Mackay as councillor for Walter Taylor in October 2023.)	LNP	3.94% v GRN
Bracken Ridge	Sandy Landers	LNP	4.15%
Holland Park	Krista Adams	LNP	4.72%
Doboy	Lisa Atwood	LNP	4.73%
Marchant	Danita Parry (Note: Parry succeeded Fiona Hammond as councillor for Marchant in November 2023.)	LNP	4.98%
Coorparoo	Fiona Cunningham	LNP	5.67% v GRN
Fairly safe
The Gap	Steven Toomey	LNP	7.05%
Central	Vicki Howard	LNP	7.77% v GRN
Runcorn	Kim Marx	LNP	8.27%
Jamboree	Sarah Hutton	LNP	9.31%
Pullenvale	Greg Adermann	LNP	9.93% v GRN
Safe
McDowall	Tracy Davis	LNP	13.54%
MacGregor	Steven Huang	LNP	14.12%
Very safe
Chandler	Ryan Murphy	LNP	18.33%
Hamilton	Julia Dixon (Note: Dixon succeeded David McLachlan as councillor for Hamilton in August 2023.)	LNP	20.46%
Labor wards (5)
Fairly safe
Morningside	Lucy Collier (Note: Collier succeeded Kara Cook as councillor for Morningside in May 2023.)	ALP	9.66%
Safe
Wynnum Manly	Sara Whitmee (Note: Whitmee succeeded Peter Cumming as councillor for Wynnum Manly in May 2023.)	ALP	11.39%
Deagon	Jared Cassidy	ALP	11.48%
Forest Lake	Charles Strunk	ALP	13.38%
Very safe
Moorooka	Steve Griffiths	ALP	19.55%
Crossbench wards (2)
Safe
The Gabba	Trina Massey (Note: Massey succeeded Jonathan Sriranganathan as councillor for The Gabba in May 2023.)	GRN	12.34% v LNP
Very safe
Tennyson	Nicole Johnston	IND	23.44% v LNP

=== Post-Election Pendulum ===
Liberal National wards (18)
Marginal
Northgate	Adam Allan	LNP	0.81%
Wynnum Manly	Alex Givney	LNP	1.13%
Walter Taylor	Penny Wolff	LNP	1.71% v GRN
Marchant	Danita Parry	LNP	2.20%
Coorparoo	Fiona Cunningham	LNP	2.30% v GRN
Central	Vicki Howard	LNP	2.98% v GRN
Enoggera	Andrew Wines	LNP	3.24% v GRN
Holland Park	Krista Adams	LNP	3.72%
Fairly safe
Runcorn	Kim Marx	LNP	5.82%
Safe
The Gap	Steven Toomey	LNP	10.16% v GRN
Bracken Ridge	Sandy Landers	LNP	11.37%
Doboy	Lisa Atwood	LNP	14.06%
Pullenvale	Greg Adermann	LNP	14.32% v GRN
Very safe
MacGregor	Steven Huang	LNP	16.44%
McDowall	Tracy Davis	LNP	17.44%
Chandler	Ryan Murphy	LNP	20.11%
Hamilton	Julia Dixon	LNP	21.13% v GRN
Jamboree	Sarah Hutton	LNP	21.90%
Labor wards (5)
Marginal
Calamvale	Emily Kim	ALP	1.71%
Morningside	Lucy Collier	ALP	4.51%
Fairly safe
Forest Lake	Charles Strunk	ALP	5.33%
Safe
Moorooka	Steve Griffiths	ALP	12.78% v GRN
Very safe
Deagon	Jared Cassidy	ALP	22.14%
Crossbench wards (3)
Marginal
Paddington	Seal Chong Wah	GRN	0.76% v LNP
Safe
The Gabba	Trina Massey	GRN	10.84% v LNP
Very safe
Tennyson	Nicole Johnston	IND	25.90% v LNP

== Results ==
=== Lord Mayor ===
2024 Queensland mayoral elections: Brisbane
Party	Candidate	Votes	%	±%
Liberal National	Adrian Schrinner	343,330	48.59	+0.85
Labor	Tracey Price	186,250	26.36	−4.58
Greens	Jonathan Sriranganathan	137,454	19.45	+4.05
Legalise Cannabis	Clive Brazier	23,580	3.34	+3.34
Independent	Bruce Tanti	10,070	1.43	+1.43
Independent	Gilbert Holmes	5,958	0.84	+0.84
Total formal votes		706,642	97.97	+0.66
Informal votes		14,656	2.03	−0.66
Turnout		721,298	85.31	
Two-party-preferred result
Liberal National	Adrian Schrinner	362,411	56.35	+0.03
Labor	Tracey Price	280,696	43.65	−0.03
Liberal National hold		Swing	+0.03	

=== Wards ===
2024 Queensland local elections: Brisbane
Party	Votes	%	Swing	Seats	Change
Liberal National	329,337	46.87	+0.99	18	▼1
Labor	188,967	26.91	−5.99	5	Steady
Greens	162,608	23.15	+5.35	2	▲1
Independent	21,390	3.05	−0.15	1	Steady
Two-party-preferred vote
Liberal National		55.4	+1.8		
Labor		44.6	−1.8		

==== Wards changing hands ====
Seat	Pre-election			Swing	Post-election		
Seat	Party	Member	Margin	Swing	Margin	Member	Party
Calamvale	Liberal National	Angela Owen	2.24	3.95	1.71	Emily Kim	Labor
Paddington	Liberal National	Clare Jenkinson	0.71	1.47	0.76	Seal Chong Wah	Greens
Wynnum Manly	Labor	Sara Whitmee	11.39	12.52	1.13	Alex Givney	Liberal National

=== Maps ===
==== Lord mayoral election ====
Two-party-preferred margin by ward

==== Ward elections ====
Two-candidate-preferred margin by ward

Two-candidate preferred swing by ward

Party holding or gaining each ward

== Candidates ==
Sitting councillors are shown in bold text.

Ward	Held by	Labor candidate	LNP candidate	Greens candidate	Other candidates
Lord Mayor	LNP	Tracey Price	**Adrian Schrinner**	Jonathan Sriranganathan	Clive Brazier (LCQ); Gilbert Holmes (Ind); Bruce Tanti (Ind)
Bracken Ridge	LNP	Thomas Stephen	**Sandy Landers**	John Harbison	
Calamvale	LNP	Emily Kim	**Angela Owen**	Andrea Wildin	
Central	LNP	Ash Murray	**Vicki Howard**	Wendy Aghdam	
Chandler	LNP	Tabatha Young	**Ryan Murphy**	Alex David	
Coorparoo	LNP	Alicia Weiderman	**Fiona Cunningham**	Kath Angus	
Deagon	Labor	**Jared Cassidy**	Brock Alexander (disendorsed)	Edward Naus	
Doboy	LNP	Alex Cossu	**Lisa Atwood**	James Smart	
Enoggera	LNP	Taylar Wojtasik	**Andrew Wines**	Quintessa Denniz	
Forest Lake	Labor	**Charles Strunk**	Kylie Gates	Vi Phuong Nguyen	
Hamilton	LNP	Leah Malzard	**Julia Dixon**	Edward Cordery	
Holland Park	LNP	Shane Warren	**Krista Adams**	David Ford	
Jamboree	LNP	Leili Golafshani	**Sarah Hutton**	Chris Richardson	
MacGregor	LNP	Ashwina Gotame	**Steven Huang**	Brent Tideswell	
Marchant	LNP	Darren Mitchell	**Danita Parry**	Mekayla Anog	
McDowall	LNP	Mark Wolhuter	**Tracy Davis**	Joshua Sanderson	David Dallaston (Ind)
Moorooka	Labor	**Steve Griffiths**	Peter Zhuang	Melissa McArdle	
Morningside	Labor	**Lucy Collier**	Allie Griffin	Linda Barry	
Northgate	LNP	Vicki Ryan	**Adam Allan**	Tiana Peneha	
Paddington	LNP	Sún Etheridge	**Clare Jenkinson**	**Seal Chong Wah**	
Pullenvale	LNP	Roberta Albrecht	**Greg Adermann**	Charles Druckmann	Kate Richards (Ind)
Runcorn	LNP	John Prescott	**Kim Marx**	Emma Eastaughffe	
Tennyson	Independent	Kane Hart	Henry Swindon	River Kearns	**Nicole Johnston** (Ind)
The Gabba	Greens	Rebecca McIntosh	Laura Wong	**Trina Massey**	
The Gap	LNP	Ben Long	**Steven Toomey**	Ann Aitken	
Walter Taylor	LNP	Rebecca Hack	**Penny Wolff**	Michaela Sargent	
Wynnum Manly	Labor	**Sara Whitmee**	Alexandra Givney	Bel Ellis	Craig Moore (Ind)

== Opinion polling ==
=== Lord Mayoral vote ===
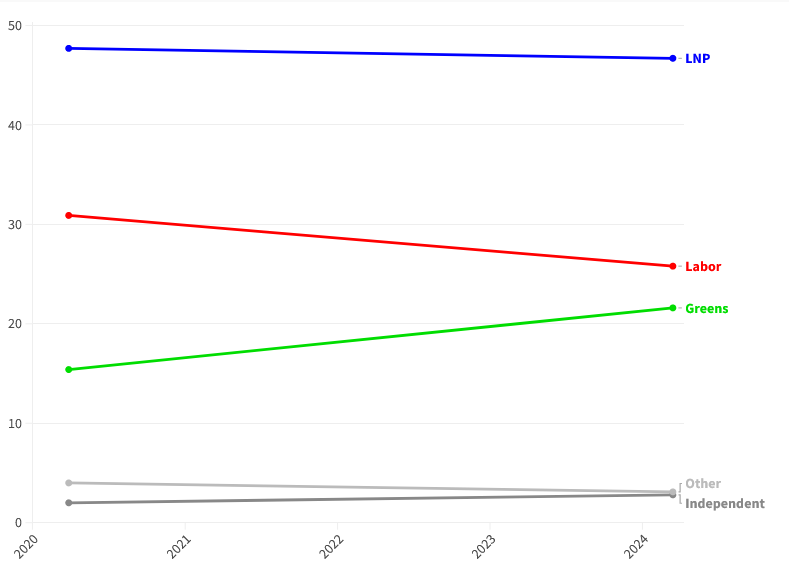

Date	Firm	Sample	Primary vote							2PP vote	
			LNP	ALP	GRN	LCQ	AJP	CLM	IND	LNP	ALP
8–14 March 2024	DemosAU	1,034	46.7%	25.8%	21.6%	3.1%	—N/a	—N/a	2.8% (Note: 1.4% for Bruce Tanti, 1.4% for Gilbert Holmes)	57.7%	42.3%
28 March 2020	Election		47.7%	30.9%	15.4%	—N/a	3.1%	0.9%	2.0% (Note: 0.7% for Frank Jordan, 0.6% for John Dobinson, 0.4% for Ben Gorringe, 0.3% for Jarrod Wirth)	56.3%	43.7%

=== Ward vote ===
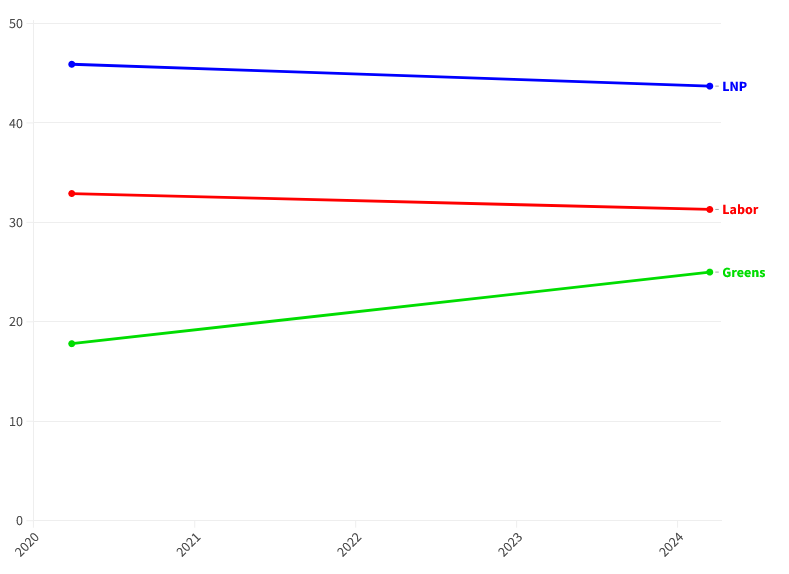

Date	Firm	Sample	Primary vote					
			LNP	ALP	GRN	AJP	CLM	IND
8–14 March 2024	DemosAU	1,034	43.7%	31.3%	25.0%	—N/a	—N/a	—N/a
28 March 2020	Election		45.9%	32.9%	17.8%	0.1%	0.1%	3.2%

== See also ==
- 2024 Queensland local elections
- 2024 Queensland mayoral elections
- 2024 Gold Coast City Council election
