= Tracey Price =

Australian politician (born 1974)

Personal details
- Party: Labor
- Education: Queensland University of Technology (EMBA, LLM, LLB, BJus, Grad.Dip.DV.)
- Website: www.traceyprice.com.au

Tracey Price (born 1974) is a lawyer, businesswoman, mediator and Labor's Lord Mayoral Candidate for the 2024 Brisbane City Council Election.

Price is a member of the Labor Left. She was identified as a potential contender in June, and endorsed as the party's mayoral candidate on 4 August 2023, after winning a preselection ballot. Labor reportedly expected Price to see a more successful campaign than previous candidate Patrick Condren, whose campaign saw the LNP-controlled Brisbane City Council gain vote share, and maintain all its wards despite a swing towards Labor at the 2020 Queensland State Election.

== Campaign and policy ==
As candidate, Price has emphasised Labor's plan to make Brisbane 'climate resilient', focusing on an expanded green waste program and revegetation across the city, including in King George Square. In light of Brisbane's vulnerability to floods, the plan includes increased drainage funding and a renewed flood buy-back scheme for affected property. She has also expressed opposition to the 'over-commercialisation' of public spaces such as Victoria Park and Mt Coot-tha, in the context of the former's redevelopment.

In response to the national housing crisis and the Greens' proposed plan of rent freezes and vacancy levies, Price has outlined her plan to audit vacant land and stalled development, with a focus on "increasing density where it is well located", and penalising land banking.

Price has sustained criticism over the course of the election campaign. Commentators, including Spencer Howson, have labelled her as 'invisible', citing her absence of public presence prior to her pre-selection, in addition to her low profile in the months following, especially contrasted with the prominence of Greens leader Jonathan Sriranganathan. She has also been criticised for her broad deference to existing Labor party platform, and has had to reconcile with State Labor policy. For example, Price was reportedly 'undecided' as to her position on the state government's broadly unpopular proposed Gabba redevelopment project. She has emphasised community feedback would be the priority in the event of such conflicts, pointing to Labor councillors' opposition to the state government's Temporary Local Planning Instrument for the Kurilpa Peninsula as evidence of such.

== Personal life ==
Price lives in North Brisbane with her husband and three children. She is a lawyer, a mediator and owns a sewing store in Chermside.
