= Jared Cassidy =

Australian politician

Councillor Jared Cassidy
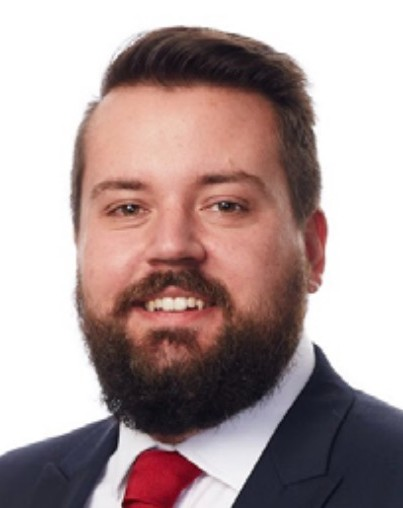

Leader of the Opposition on Brisbane City Council
- Incumbent
- Assumed office September 2019
- Preceded by: Peter Cumming

Leader of the Labor Party on Brisbane City Council
- Incumbent
- Assumed office September 2019
- Preceded by: Peter Cumming

Councillor of the City of Brisbane for Deagon Ward
- Incumbent
- Assumed office 17 August 2015
- Preceded by: Victoria Newton

Personal details
- Born: Jared Ryan Cassidy
- Party: Labor (since 2004)

Jared Ryan Cassidy is an Australian politician. He has served as Leader of the Opposition and leader of the Labor Party on Brisbane City Council since 2019.

== Political career ==
Cassidy was appointed to council to fill a casual vacancy on Deagon Ward in 2015, following the resignation of longtime councillor Victoria Newton. Prior to being elected, he worked for Newton and had previously worked for former treasurer Wayne Swan.

At the 2016 Brisbane City Council election, Cassidy was elected in his own right with 53.7% of the vote after preferences. Following the election, where Labor leader Milton Dick did not recontest his seat, there was speculation that Cassidy would contest the position of Labor leader. However, this did not happen, and Peter Cumming was elected to the role unopposed.

=== Leader of the Opposition ===
In September 2019, six months before the 2020 Brisbane City Council election, Cumming stepped down as leader and Cassidy took his place.

On 12 November 2019, he was escorted out of the council chamber after he refused an order to leave for yelling "crock of shit".

Cassidy was re-elected in 2020 with an increased primary and two-party-preferred vote. In 2024 Cassidy was once again re-elected with a 58.46% primary vote.
