= Jamboree Ward =

Brisbane City Council ward

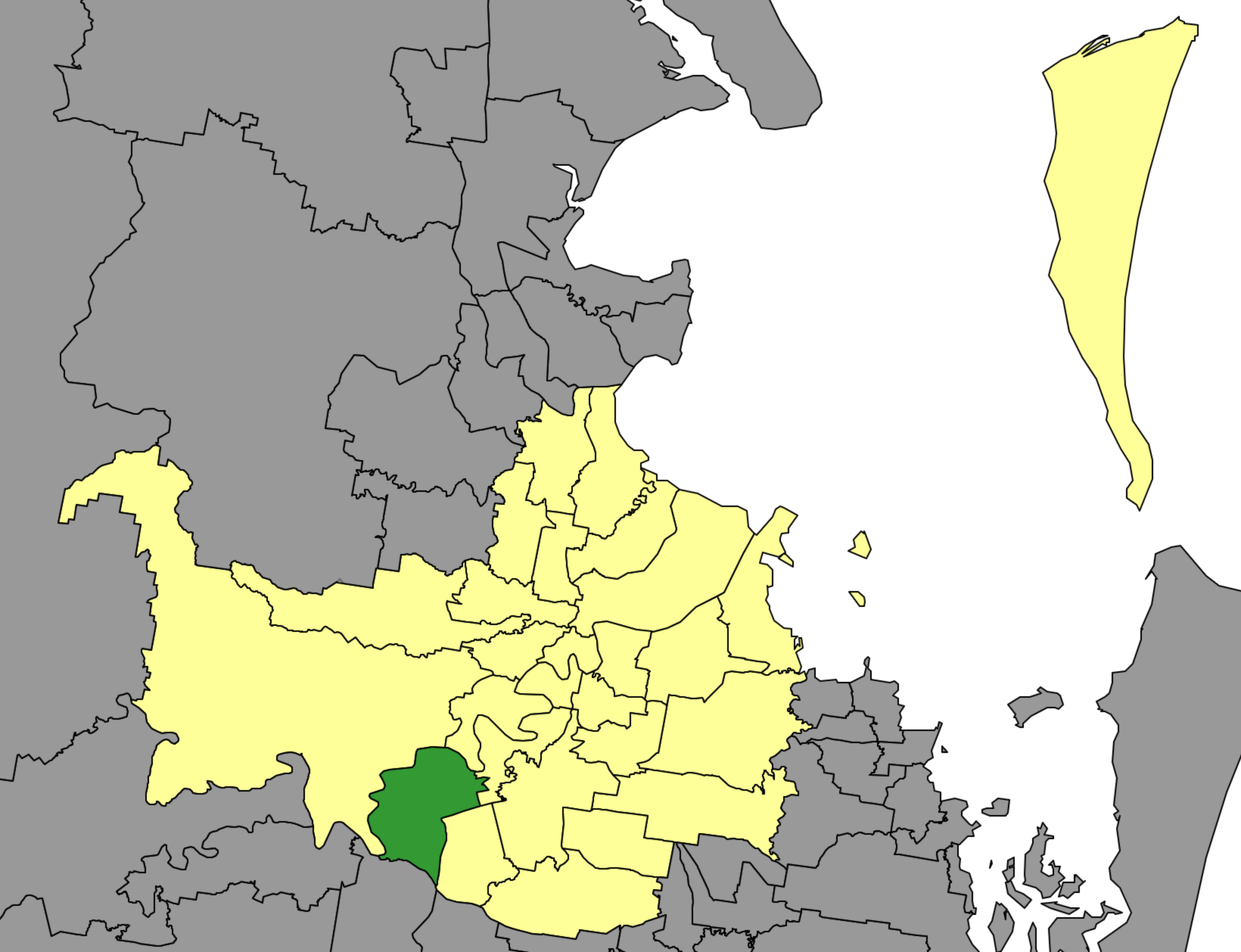
- Created: 1985
- MP: Sarah Hutton
- Party: Liberal National
- Namesake: Jamboree Heights
- Electors: 31,037 (2024)

The Jamboree Ward is a Brisbane City Council ward covering Jamboree Heights, Darra, Jindalee, Middle Park, Mt Ommaney, Riverhills, Seventeen Mile Rocks, Sinnamon Park, Wacol and parts of Ellen Grove and Oxley.

== Councillors for Jamboree Ward ==
| Image | Member | Party | Term | Notes |
|---|---|---|---|---|
| | Phil Denman | Liberal | 30 March 1985 – 28 March 1991 | Represented preceding Corinda Ward from 1976 until its abolishment. |
| | Christine Watson | Liberal | 28 March 1991 – 25 March 2000 | |
| | Felicity Farmer | Labor | 25 March 2000 – 15 March 2008 | |
| | Matthew Bourke | Liberal | 15 March 2008 - 26 July 2008 | |
| | Matthew Bourke | Liberal National | 26 July 2008 – 26 March 2020 | |
| | Sarah Hutton | Liberal National | 26 March 2020 – present | |

== Results ==
=== 2024 ===
2024 Queensland local elections: Jamboree Ward
| Party | Candidate | Votes | % | ±% |
|---|---|---|---|---|
| Liberal National | Sarah Hutton | 17,391 | 65.90 | +10.96 |
| Labor | Leili Golafshani | 5,007 | 18.97 | −13.68 |
| Greens | Chris Richardson | 3,991 | 15.12 | +2.71 |
| Total formal votes | | 26,389 | 97.85 | +0.82 |
| Informal votes | | 580 | 2.15 | −0.82 |
| Turnout | | 26,969 | 86.89 | +2.71 |
Two-party-preferred result
| Liberal National | Sarah Hutton | 18,008 | 71.90 | +12.60 |
| Labor | Leili Golafshani | 7,038 | 28.10 | −12.60 |
| Liberal National hold | | Swing | +12.60 | |

=== 2020 ===
2020 Queensland local elections: Jamboree Ward
| Party | Candidate | Votes | % | ±% |
|---|---|---|---|---|
| Liberal National | Sarah Hutton | 13,455 | 54.9 | −7.6 |
| Labor | Rachel Hoppe | 7,996 | 32.7 | +7.6 |
| Greens | Thomas McKie | 3,039 | 12.4 | +0.6 |
| Total formal votes | | 24,490 | | |
| Informal votes | | 750 | | |
| Turnout | | 25,240 | | |
Two-party-preferred result
| Liberal National | Sarah Hutton | 13,764 | 59.3 | −8.7 |
| Labor | Rachel Hoppe | 9,442 | 40.7 | +8.7 |
| Liberal National hold | | Swing | −8.7 | |

=== 2016 ===
2016 Queensland local elections: Jamboree Ward
| Party | Candidate | Votes | % | ±% |
|---|---|---|---|---|
| Liberal National | Matthew Bourke | 15,088 | 64.1 | −3.7 |
| Labor | Matthew Johns | 5,763 | 24.5 | −1.5 |
| Greens | Dorotee Braun | 2,684 | 11.4 | +5.2 |
| Total formal votes | | 23,535 | - | − |
| Informal votes | | 602 | - | − |
| Turnout | | 24,137 | - | − |
Two-party-preferred result
| Liberal National | Matthew Bourke | 15,476 | 69.1 | −2 |
| Labor | Matthew Johns | 6,923 | 30.9 | +2 |
| Liberal National hold | | Swing | −2 | |

=== 2004 ===
2004 Brisbane City Council election: Jamboree Ward
| Party | Candidate | Votes | % | ±% |
|---|---|---|---|---|
| Labor | Felicity Farmer | 10,975 | 50.54 | |
| Liberal | Lynne Jennings | 8,834 | 40.68 | |
| Greens | Jos Hall | 1,905 | 8.77 | |
| Total formal votes | | 21,714 | 98.66 | |
| Informal votes | | 294 | 1.34 | |
| Turnout | | 22,008 | 88.44 | |
Two-party-preferred result
| Labor | Felicity Farmer | 11,818 | 56.55 | |
| Liberal | Lynne Jennings | 9,079 | 43.45 | |
| Labor hold | | Swing | | |
