= Hamilton Ward (City of Brisbane) =

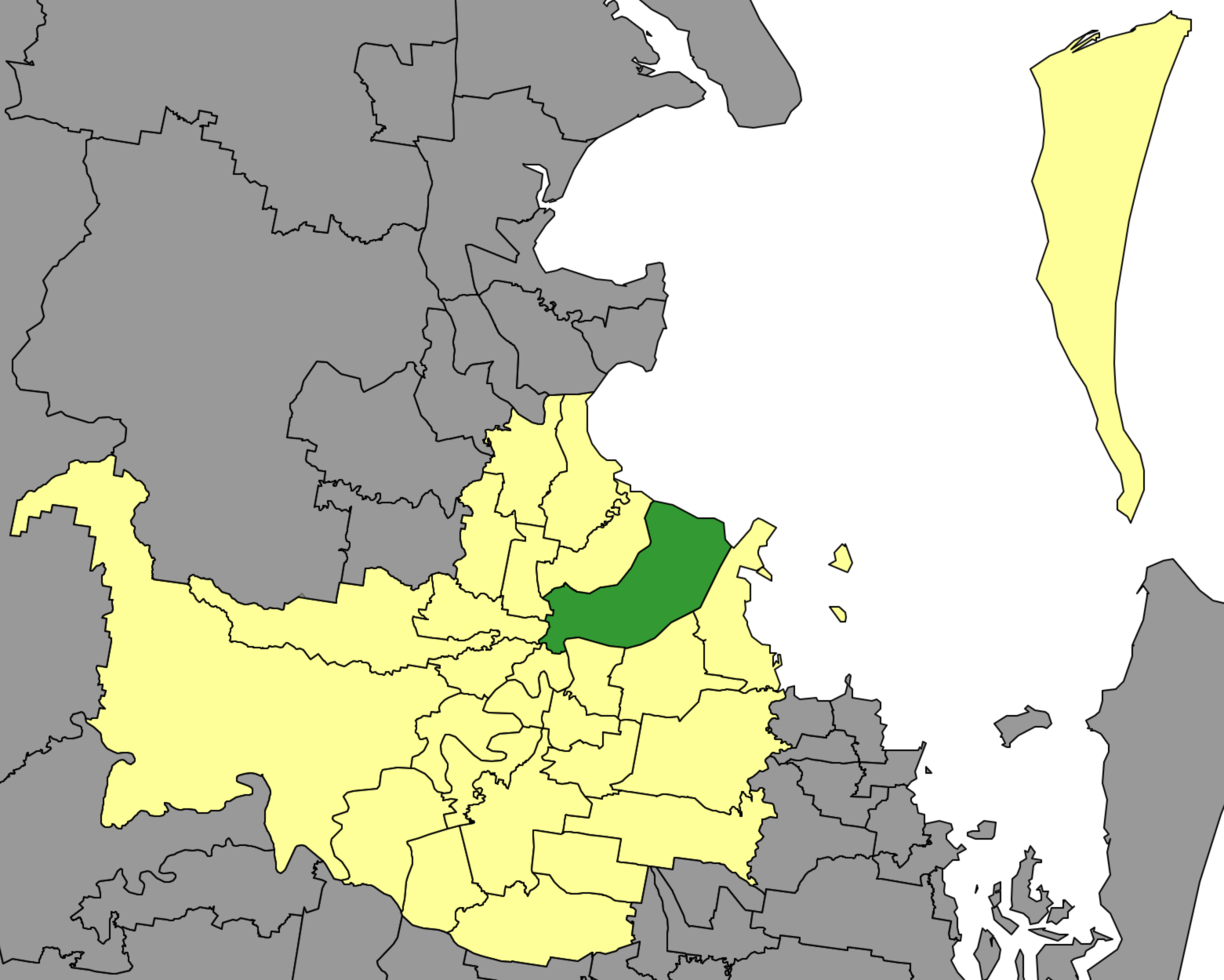
- MP: Julia Dixon
- Party: Liberal National
- Namesake: Hamilton
- Electors: 33,133 (2024)
- Demographic: Outer-metropolitan

The Hamilton Ward is a Brisbane City Council ward covering Hamilton, Albion, Ascot, Clayfield, Eagle Farm, Hendra, Kalinga, Pinkenba, Wooloowin, and parts of Nundah and Windsor.

== Councillors for Hamilton Ward ==
Member	Party	Term
Tim Nicholls	Liberal	2000–2006
David McLachlan	Liberal	2006–2008
David McLachlan	Liberal National	2008–2023
Julia Dixon	Liberal National	2023–present

== Results ==
=== 2024 ===
2024 Queensland local elections: Hamilton Ward
Party	Candidate	Votes	%	±%
Liberal National	Julia Dixon	16,862	63.26	−0.48
Greens	Edward Cordery	5,297	19.87	+3.45
Labor	Leah Malzard	4,498	16.87	−2.97
Total formal votes		26,657	98.45	+0.74
Informal votes		421	1.55	−0.74
Turnout		26,657	80.45	+6.01
Two-candidate-preferred result
Liberal National	Julia Dixon	17,531	71.13	+0.63
Greens	Edward Cordery	7,115	28.87	+28.87
Liberal National hold		Swing	+0.63	

=== 2020 ===
2020 Queensland local elections: Hamilton Ward
Party	Candidate	Votes	%	±%
Liberal National	David McLachlan	13,398	63.90	+2.68
Labor	Leah Malzard	4,202	20.04	–4.36
Greens	Miranda Bertram	3,368	16.06	+1.69
Total formal votes		22,122	97.71	+0.15
Informal votes		519	2.29	–0.15
Turnout		22,641	74.44	–6.8
Two-party-preferred result
Liberal National	David McLachlan	14,471	70.46	N/A
Labor	Leah Malzard	6,066	29.54	N/A
Liberal National hold		Swing	N/A	

=== 2016 ===
2016 Queensland local elections: Hamilton Ward
Party	Candidate	Votes	%	±%
Liberal National	David McLachlan	13,697	61.22	–6.42
Labor	Philip Anthony	5,461	24.41	+4.85
Greens	Rachel Hannam	3,216	14.37	+1.57
Total formal votes		22,374	79.26	+2.73
Informal votes		559	2.44	+0.33
Turnout		22,933	81.24	+3.06
Liberal National hold		Swing	N/A	

=== 2004 ===
2004 Brisbane City Council election: Hamilton Ward
Party	Candidate	Votes	%	±%
Liberal	Tim Nicholls	11,470	60.18	
Labor	Kerrina King	5,359	28.12	
Greens	Michael Mather	2,230	11.70	
Total formal votes		19,059	98.20	
Informal votes		349	1.80	
Turnout		19,408	83.30	
Two-party-preferred result
Liberal	Tim Nicholls	11,776	66.32	
Labor	Kerrina King	5,980	33.68	
Liberal hold		Swing		

=== 1931 ===
1931 Brisbane City Council election: Hamilton Ward
Party	Candidate	Votes	%	±%
Civic Reform	Archibald Tait	2,052	58.76	
National Citizens	Charles Campbell	957	27.41	
Non-party Progressive	Stanley Carrick	503	14.40	
Total formal votes		3,492	97.22	
Informal votes		100	2.78	
Turnout		3,592	85.32	
Civic Reform win		(new ward)		
