= Morningside Ward =

Brisbane City Council ward

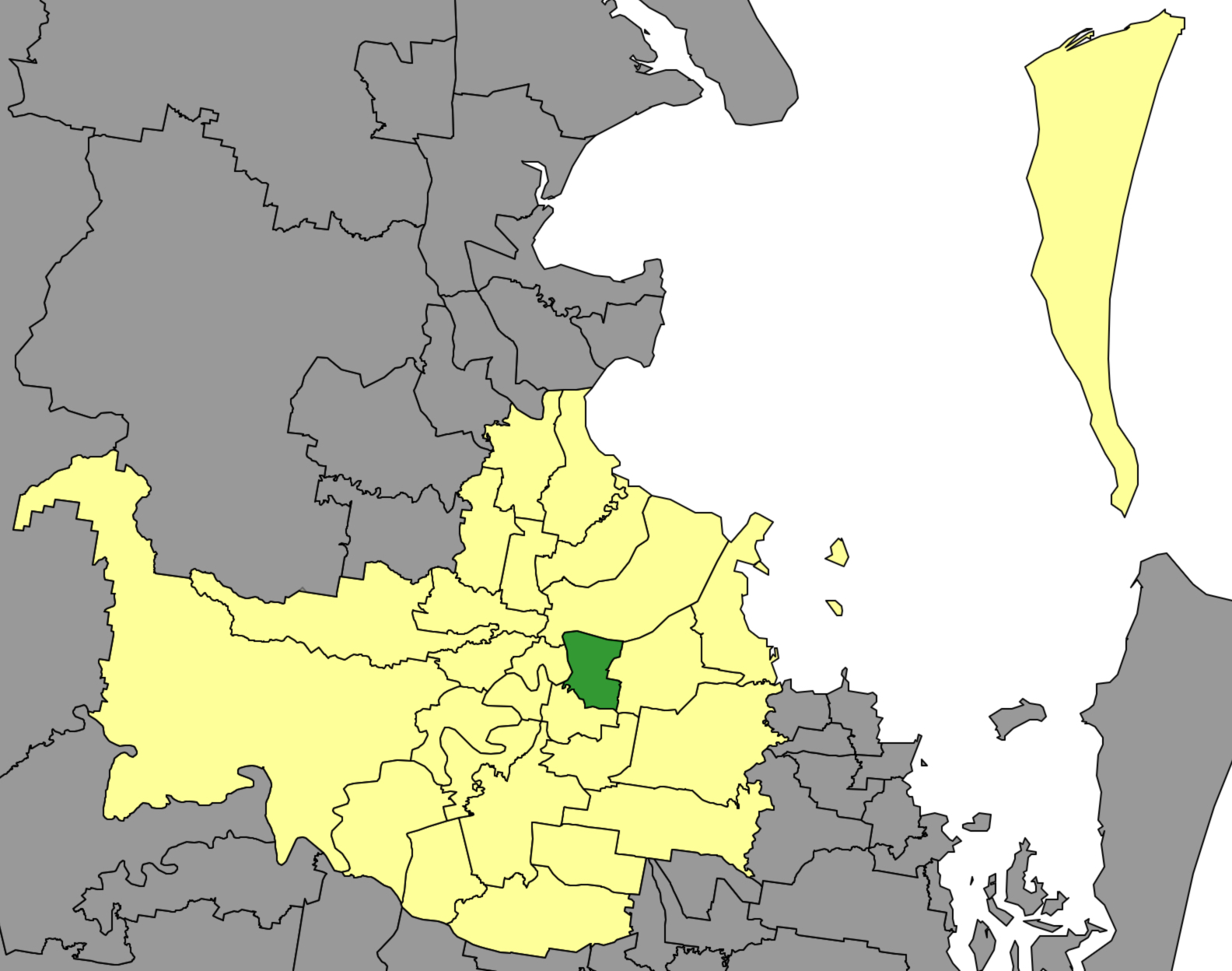
- MP: Lucy Collier
- Party: Labor
- Namesake: Morningside
- Electors: 31,563 (2024)
- Demographic: Inner metropolitan

The Morningside Ward is a Brisbane City Council ward covering Morningside, Balmoral, Bulimba, Hawthorne, Norman Park, Seven Hills, and parts of Camp Hill and Cannon Hill.

== Councillors for Morningside Ward ==
Member	Party	Term
Sharon Humphreys	Labor	1994–2004
Shayne Sutton	Labor	2004–2017
Kara Cook	Labor	2018–2023
Lucy Collier	Labor	2023–present

== Results ==
=== 2024 ===
2024 Queensland local elections: Morningside Ward
Party	Candidate	Votes	%	±%
Liberal National	Allie Griffin	10,600	40.14	+3.24
Labor	Lucy Collier	9,173	34.73	−13.17
Greens	Linda Barry	6,637	25.13	+9.93
Total formal votes		26,410	98.32	
Informal votes		450	1.68	
Turnout		26,860	85.10	
Two-party-preferred result
Labor	Lucy Collier	13,393	54.51	−5.09
Liberal National	Allie Griffin	11,176	45.49	+5.09
Labor hold		Swing	−5.09	

=== 2020 ===
2020 Queensland local elections: Morningside Ward
Party	Candidate	Votes	%	±%
Labor	Kara Cook	10,677	47.9	−0.3
Liberal National	Toby Moore	8,242	36.9	−4.2
Greens	Rolf Kuelsen	3,390	15.2	+4.5
Total formal votes		22,309		
Informal votes		445		
Turnout		22,754		
Two-party-preferred result
Labor	Kara Cook	12,543	59.7	+3.8
Liberal National	Toby Moore	8,482	40.3	−3.8
Labor hold		Swing	+3.8	

=== 2018 by-election ===
2018 Morningside Ward by-election
Party	Candidate	Votes	%	±%
Labor	Kara Cook	10,241	50.04	+1.24
Liberal National	Melina Morgan	7,561	36.95	−3.55
Greens	Rolf Kuelsen	2,331	11.39	+0.69
Independent	Angus Jell	331	1.62	+1.62
Total formal votes		20,464	98.50	
Informal votes		312	1.50	
Turnout		20,776		
Two-party-preferred result
Labor	Kara Cook	11,999	60.24	+3.64
Liberal National	Melina Morgan	7,919	39.76	−3.64
Labor hold		Swing	+3.64	

=== 2004 ===
2004 Brisbane City Council election: Morningside Ward
Party	Candidate	Votes	%	±%
Labor	Shayne Sutton	8,248	43.10	
Liberal	Maurice Lane	7,366	38.49	
Greens	Rob Wilson	2,405	12.57	
Independent	Simeon Adams	1,116	5.83	
Total formal votes		19,135	97.86	
Informal votes		419	2.14	
Turnout		19,554	84.32	
Two-party-preferred result
Labor	Shayne Sutton	9,215	54.18	
Liberal	Maurice Lane	7,792	45.82	
Labor hold		Swing		
