= Wynnum Manly Ward =

Brisbane City Council ward

Wynnum Manly Ward Queensland — Brisbane City Council
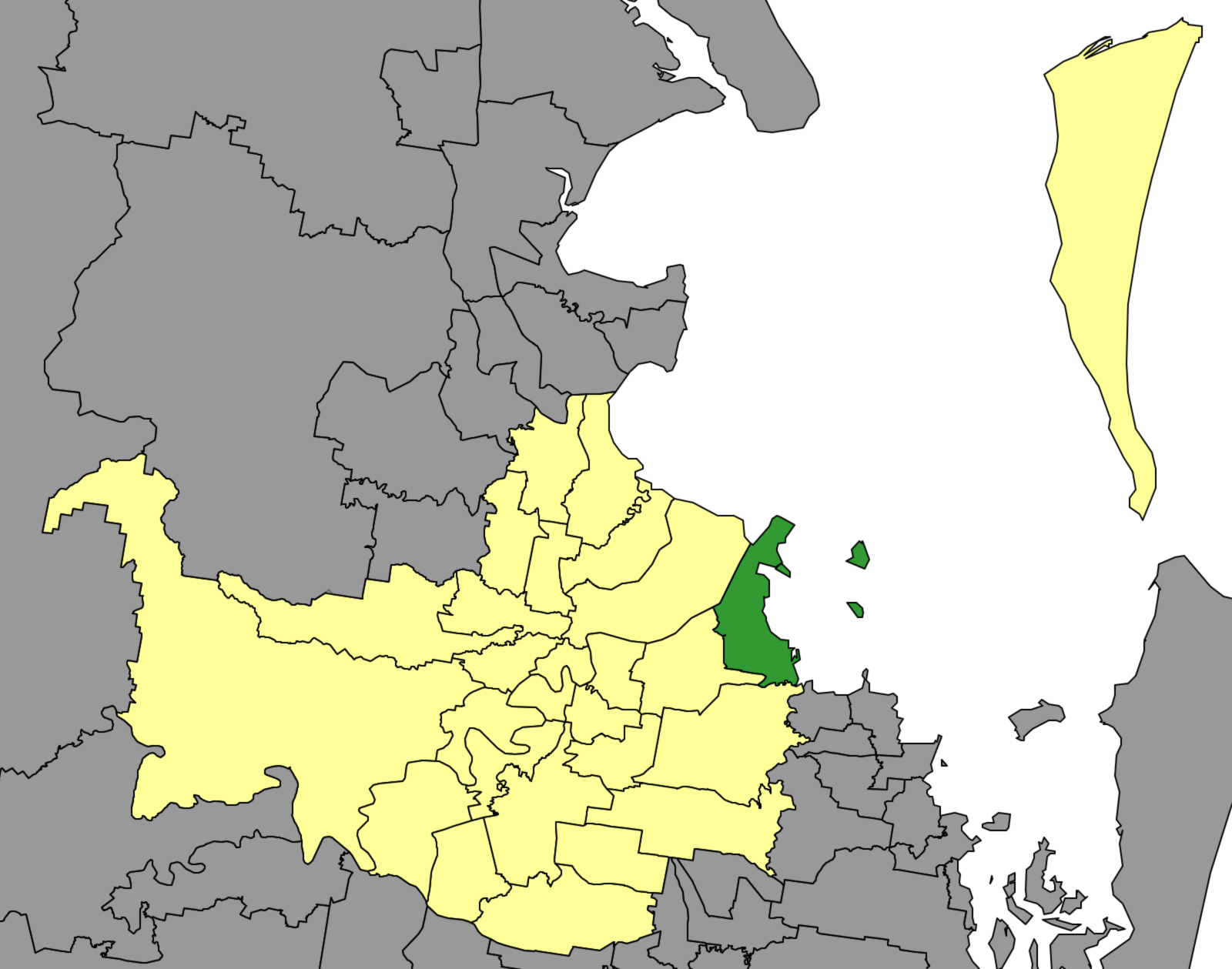
- Created: 1994
- Councillor: Alex Givney
- Party: Liberal National
- Namesake: Wynnum, Manly
- Electors: 30,902 (2024)

Wynnum Manly Ward, sometimes stylised as Wynnum-Manly is a Brisbane City Council ward covering Wynnum, Wynnum West, Manly, Lota, Lytton, Port of Brisbane, and part of Manly West. The ward was established for the 1994 Brisbane City Council election, and largely succeeds the former wards of Wynnum (1925-1973), Waterloo Bay (1973-1985) and Kianawah (1985-1994).

The ward has been represented by Alex Givney of the Liberal National Party since the 2024 Brisbane City Council election. It had previously been held Labor Party since its creation in 1994.

== Councillors for Wynnum Manly Ward ==
Member	Party	Term
Bill Dart	Nationalist	1925–1931
John William Greene	Independent	1931–1934
Bill Dart	United Australia	1934–1938
Ralph Powell	Protestant Labor	1938–1940
Willie Howard	United Australia	1940–1941
Willie Howard	Liberal	1941–1952
George Clayton	Labor	1952–1967
Eric Shaw	Labor	1967-19??
Don Randall	Labor	19??–1994
Peter Cumming	Labor	1994–2023
Sara Whitmee	Labor	2023–2024
Alex Givney	Liberal National	2024–present

== Results ==
=== 2024 ===
2024 Queensland local elections: Wynnum Manly Ward
Party	Candidate	Votes	%	±%
Liberal National	Alexandra Givney	10,813	41.13	+5.13
Labor	Sara Whitmee	8,196	31.17	−22.63
Greens	Bel Ellis	4,049	15.4	+5.2
Independent	Craig Moore	3,234	12.3	+12.3
Total formal votes		26,292	97.58	
Informal votes		652	2.42	
Turnout		26,944	85.08	
Two-party-preferred result
Liberal National	Alex Givney	11,913	51.13	+12.53
Labor	Sara Whitmee	11,385	48.87	−12.53
Liberal National gain from Labor		Swing	+12.53	

=== 2020 ===
2020 Queensland local elections: Wynnum Manly Ward
Party	Candidate	Votes	%	±%
Labor	Peter Cumming	12,436	53.9	−2.0
Liberal National	Megan Piccardi	8,292	35.9	+0.2
Greens	Ken Austin	2,355	10.2	+1.9
Total formal votes		23,083		
Informal votes		537		
Turnout		23,620		
Two-party-preferred result
Labor	Peter Cumming	13,581	61.4	−0.3
Liberal National	Megan Piccardi	8,541	38.6	+0.3
Labor hold		Swing	−0.3	

=== 2016 ===
2016 Queensland local elections: Wynnum Manly Ward
Party	Candidate	Votes	%	±%
Labor	Peter Cumming	13,344	55.8	+13
Liberal National	Deirdre Thomson	8,574	35.9	−6.8
Greens	Sonja Gerdsen	1,990	8.3	+1.7
Total formal votes		23,908	-	−
Informal votes		576	-	−
Turnout		24,484	-	−
Two-party-preferred result
Labor	Peter Cumming	14,138	61.6	+10.9
Liberal National	Deirdre Thomson	8,827	38.4	−10.9
Labor hold		Swing	+10.9	

=== 2004 ===
2004 Brisbane City Council election: Wynnum Manly Ward
Party	Candidate	Votes	%	±%
Labor	Peter Cumming	9,925	47.06	
Liberal	Jeremy Knight	7,622	36.14	
Independent	Paul Brooks	3,544	16.80	
Total formal votes		21,091	97.65	
Informal votes		508	2.35	
Turnout		21,599	88.91	
Two-party-preferred result
Labor	Peter Cumming	10,385	55.79	
Liberal	Jeremy Knight	8,229	44.21	
Labor hold		Swing		
