= MacGregor Ward =

Brisbane City Council ward

MacGregor Ward Queensland — Brisbane City Council
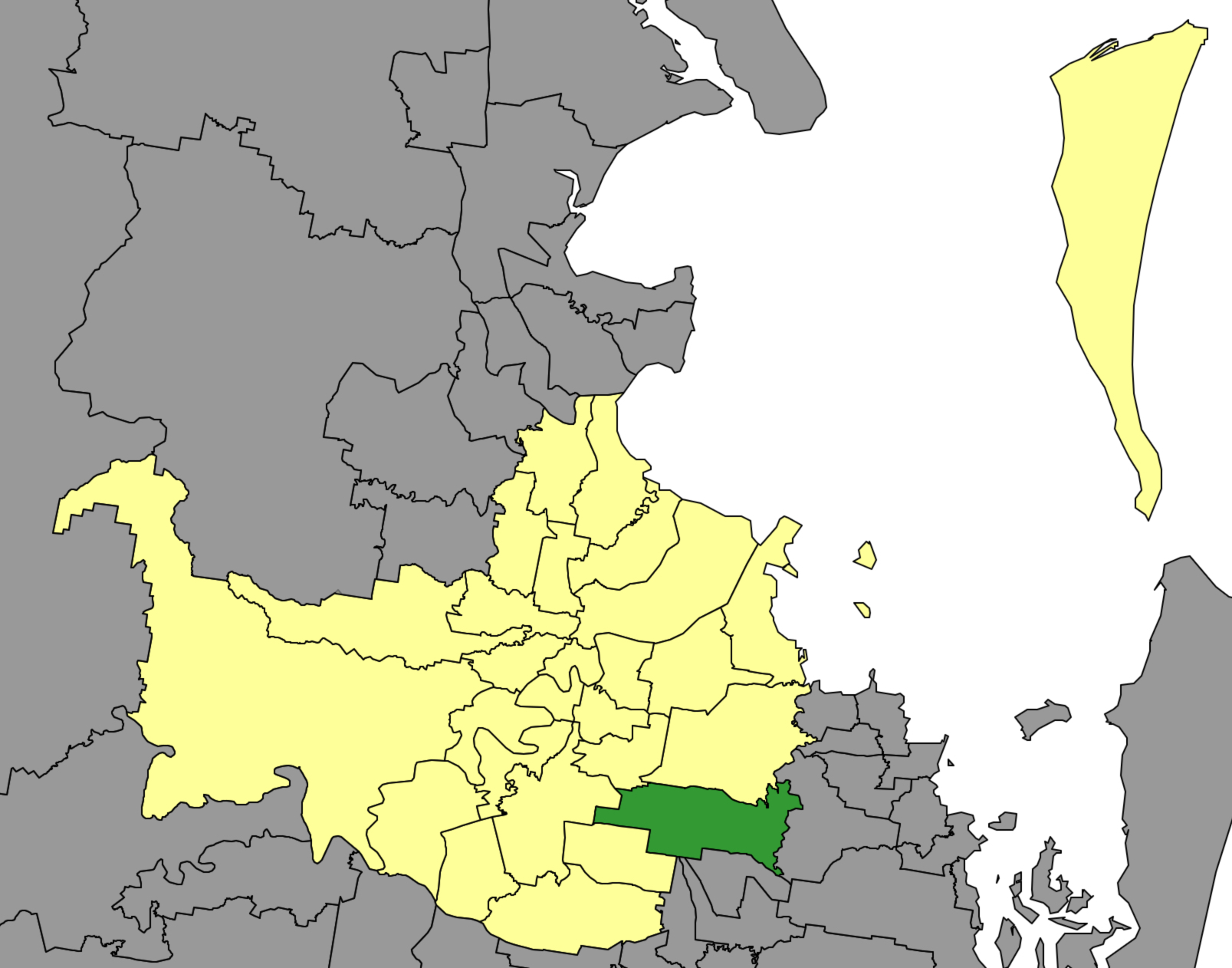
- Created: 2008
- Councillor: Steven Huang
- Party: Liberal National
- Namesake: MacGregor
- Electors: 30,691 (2024)
- Demographic: Outer metropolitan

MacGregor Ward is a ward in the Brisbane City Council in Queensland, Australia. It covers MacGregor, Eight Mile Plains, Robertson, Upper Mt Gravatt and Wishart.

== Councillors for MacGregor Ward ==
Member	Party	Term
Graham Quirk	Liberal	2008
Graham Quirk	Liberal National	2008–2011
Steven Huang	Liberal National	2011–present

== Results ==
=== 2024 ===
2024 Queensland local elections: MacGregor Ward
Party	Candidate	Votes	%	±%
Liberal National	Steven Huang	15,165	60.34	+0.95
Labor	Ashwina Gotame	5,957	23.70	−5.05
Greens	Brent Tideswell	4,009	15.96	+4.10
Total formal votes		25,131	97.82	+0.55
Informal votes		561	2.18	−0.55
Turnout		25,692	83.71	+2.63
Two-party-preferred result
Liberal National	Steven Huang	15,655	66.44	+2.34
Labor	Ashwina Gotame	7,909	33.56	−2.34
Liberal National hold		Swing	+2.34	

=== 2020 ===
2020 Queensland local elections: MacGregor Ward
Party	Candidate	Votes	%	±%
Liberal National	Steven Huang	13,345	59.4	+0.4
Labor	Trent McTiernan	6,460	28.7	−0.1
Greens	Sean Womersley	2,666	11.9	−0.3
Total formal votes		22,471		
Informal votes		630		
Turnout		23,101		
Two-party-preferred result
Liberal National	Steven Huang	13,588	64.1	−0.8
Labor	Trent McTiernan	7,603	35.9	+0.8
Liberal National hold		Swing	−0.8	

=== 2016 ===
2016 Queensland local elections: MacGregor Ward
Party	Candidate	Votes	%	±%
Liberal National	Steven Huang	13,017	57.6	−11.3
Labor	Tom Huang	6,748	29.9	+9
Greens	Patsy O'Brien	2,831	12.5	+5.1
Total formal votes		22,596	-	−
Informal votes		636	-	−
Turnout		23,232	-	−
Two-party-preferred result
Liberal National	Steven Huang	13,392	63.7	−11.4
Labor	Tom Huang	7,626	36.3	+11.4
Liberal National hold		Swing	−11.4	
