= Chandler Ward =

Brisbane City Council ward

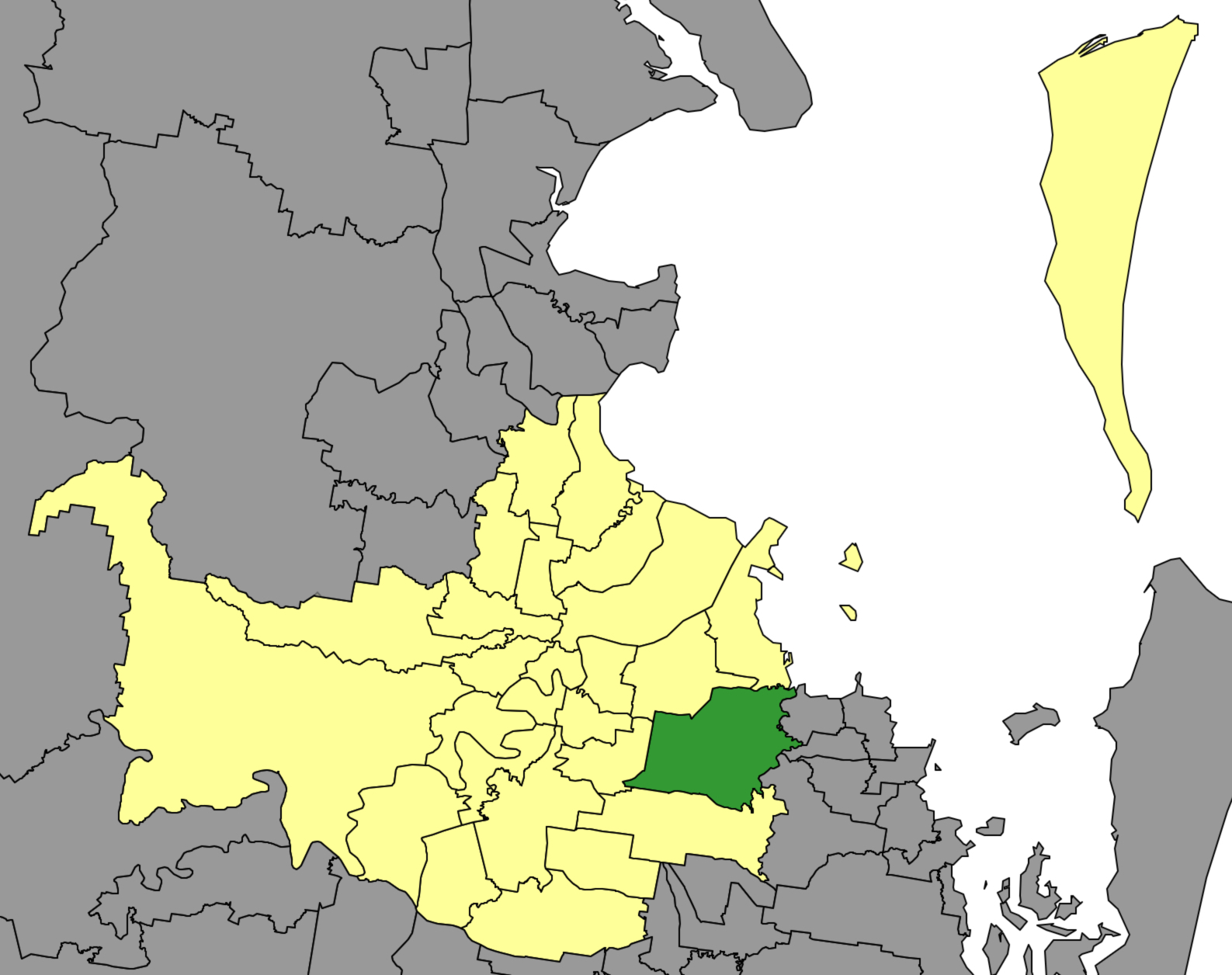
- MP: Ryan Murphy
- Party: Liberal National
- Namesake: Chandler
- Electors: 30,229 (2024)
- Demographic: Outer metropolitan

Chandler Ward is an electoral district (known as a ward) within the Brisbane City Council in Queensland, Australia. It includes the suburbs of Chandler, Burbank, Carindale, Gumdale, Mackenzie, Mansfield, Ransome, Rochedale, and parts of Belmont and Wakerley.

== Councillors for Chandler Ward ==
Member	Party	Term
Graeme McDougall	Liberal	1988–1996
Michael Caltabiano	Liberal	1996–2005
Adrian Schrinner	Liberal	2005–2008
Adrian Schrinner	Liberal National	2008–2019
Ryan Murphy	Liberal National	2019–present

== Results ==
=== 2024 ===
2024 Queensland local elections: Chandler Ward
Party	Candidate	Votes	%	±%
Liberal National	Ryan Murphy	17,167	65.43	+1.54
Labor	Tabatha Young	5,748	21.91	−3.48
Greens	Alex David	3,321	12.66	+1.94
Total formal votes		26,236	98.16	+0.50
Informal votes		493	1.84	−0.50
Turnout		26,729	88.42	+4.23
Two-party-preferred result
Liberal National	Ryan Murphy	17,517	70.11	+1.78
Labor	Tabatha Young	7,467	29.89	−1.78
Liberal National hold		Swing	+1.78	

=== 2020 ===
2020 Queensland local elections: Chandler Ward
Party	Candidate	Votes	%	±%
Liberal National	Ryan Murphy	15,516	63.9	–3.7
Labor	Penny O'Neill	6,167	25.4	+1.8
Greens	Steph Moss	2,604	10.7	+2.3
Total formal votes		24,278		
Informal votes		581		
Turnout		24,868		
Two-party-preferred result
Liberal National	Ryan Murphy	15,764	68.3	–3.8
Labor	Penny O'Neill	7,307	31.7	+3.8
Liberal National hold		Swing	–3.8	

=== 2016 ===
2016 Queensland local elections:Chandler Ward
Party	Candidate	Votes	%	±%
Liberal National	Adrian Schrinner	15,591	70.2	–6.5
Labor	Torryn Saker	4,755	21.4	–1.8
Greens	Geoff Ebbs	1,865	8.4	+8.4
Total formal votes		22,211	97.9	+0.1
Informal votes		477	2.1	–0.1
Turnout		22,688	-	−
Two-party-preferred result
Liberal National	Adrian Schrinner	15,867	74.6	–2.2
Labor	Torryn Saker	5,390	25.4	+2.2
Liberal National hold		Swing	–2.2	

=== 2012 ===
2012 Brisbane City Council election: Chandler Ward
Party	Candidate	Votes	%	±%
Liberal National	Adrian Schrinner	16,768	76.78	+5.59
Labor	Liz Starr	5,070	23.22	–5.59
Informal votes		495	2.22	+0.39
Liberal National hold		Swing	+5.59	

=== 2008 ===
2008 Queensland local elections: Chandler Ward
Party	Candidate	Votes	%	±%
Liberal	Adrian Schrinner	15,796	71.19	+3.25
Labor	Peter Lovegrove	6,393	28.81	–3.25
Informal votes		414	1.83	–0.37
Liberal hold		Swing	+5.59	

=== 2004 ===
2004 Brisbane City Council election: Chandler Ward
Party	Candidate	Votes	%	±%
Liberal	Michael Caltabiano	14,291	67.94	
Labor	Chris Forrester	6,745	32.06	
Total formal votes		21,036	97.80	
Informal votes		473	2.20	
Turnout		21,509	88.52	
Two-party-preferred result
Liberal	Michael Caltabiano	14,291	67.94	
Labor	Chris Forrester	6,745	32.06	
Liberal hold		Swing		
