= Doboy Ward =

Ward of Brisbane, Australia

Doboy Ward Queensland — Brisbane City Council
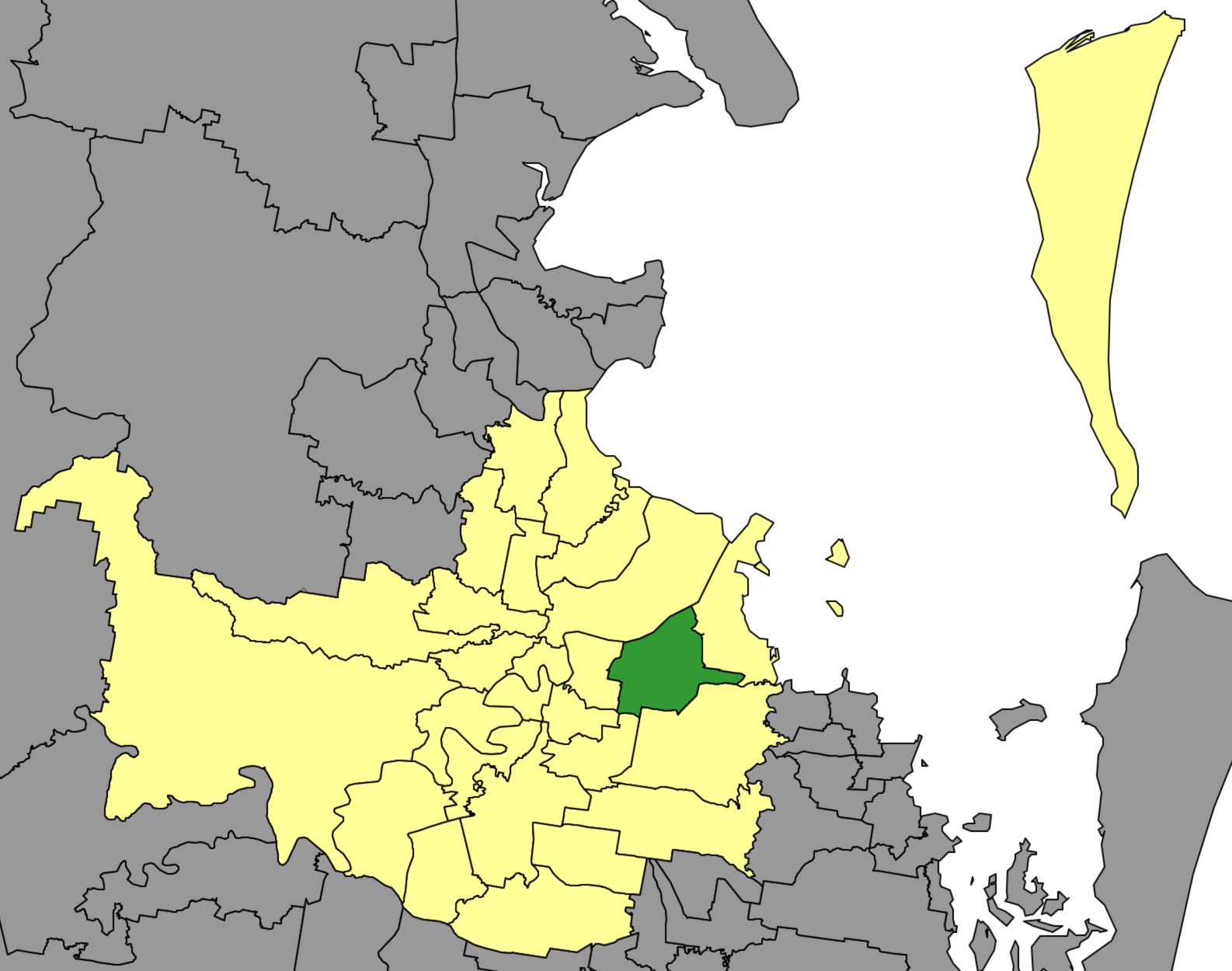
- Created: 1982
- Councillor: Lisa Atwood
- Party: Liberal National Party
- Electors: 30,837 (2024)
- Demographic: Outer metropolitan

Doboy Ward is a Brisbane City Council ward in Queensland, Australia, covering Carina, Hemmant, Murarrie, Tingalpa, and parts of Belmont, Cannon Hill, Manly West and Wakerley. The ward was created in 1982 and is currently represented by Lisa Atwood of the Liberal National Party.

== Councillors for Doboy ==
Member	Party	Term
John Campbell	Labor	1982–2012
Ryan Murphy	Liberal National	2012–2019
Lisa Atwood	Liberal National	2019–present

== Results ==
=== 2024 ===
2024 Queensland local elections: Doboy Ward
Party	Candidate	Votes	%	±%
Liberal National	Lisa Atwood	15,377	58.90	+4.17
Labor	Alex Cossu	6,757	25.88	−19.39
Greens	James Smart	3,971	15.21	+15.21
Total formal votes		26,105	97.87	+0.67
Informal votes		568	2.13	−0.67
Turnout		26,673	86.50	+4.35
Two-party-preferred result
Liberal National	Lisa Atwood	15,886	64.06	+9.36
Labor	Alex Cossu	8,912	35.94	−9.36
Liberal National hold		Swing	+9.36	

=== 2020 ===
2020 Queensland local elections: Doboy Ward
Party	Candidate	Votes	%	±%
Liberal National	Lisa Atwood	12,549	54.7	+9.6
Labor	Jo Culshaw	10,379	45.3	+2.7
Total formal votes		22,928		
Informal votes		661		
Turnout		23,589		
Two-party-preferred result
Liberal National	Lisa Atwood	12,549	54.7	+4.7
Labor	Jo Culshaw	10,379	45.3	−4.7
Liberal National hold		Swing	+4.7	

=== 2016 ===
2016 Brisbane City Council election: Doboy Ward
Party	Candidate	Votes	%	±%
Liberal National	Ryan Murphy	11,180	49.1	−4.4
Labor	Kerryn Loose Jones	8,858	38.9	−7.6
Greens	Dave Nelson	1,788	7.9	+7.9
Independent	Luke Quinn	950	4.2	+4.2
Total formal votes		22,776	-	−
Informal votes		692	-	−
Turnout		23,468	-	−
Two-party-preferred result
Liberal National	Ryan Murphy	11,559	54.3	+0.8
Labor	Kerryn Loose Jones	9,737	45.7	−0.8
Liberal National hold		Swing	+0.8	

=== 2004 ===
2004 Brisbane City Council election: Doboy Ward
Party	Candidate	Votes	%	±%
Labor	John Campbell	10,144	50.28	
Liberal	Steve Hill	8,222	40.75	
Independent	Peter Lovegrove	1,811	8.98	
Total formal votes		20,177	97.41	
Informal votes		537	2.59	
Turnout		20,714	88.33	
Two-party-preferred result
Labor	John Campbell	10,388	54.97	
Liberal	Steve Hill	8,511	45.03	
Labor hold		Swing		
