= Tennyson Ward =

Ward of Brisbane City Council

Tennyson Ward Queensland — Brisbane City Council
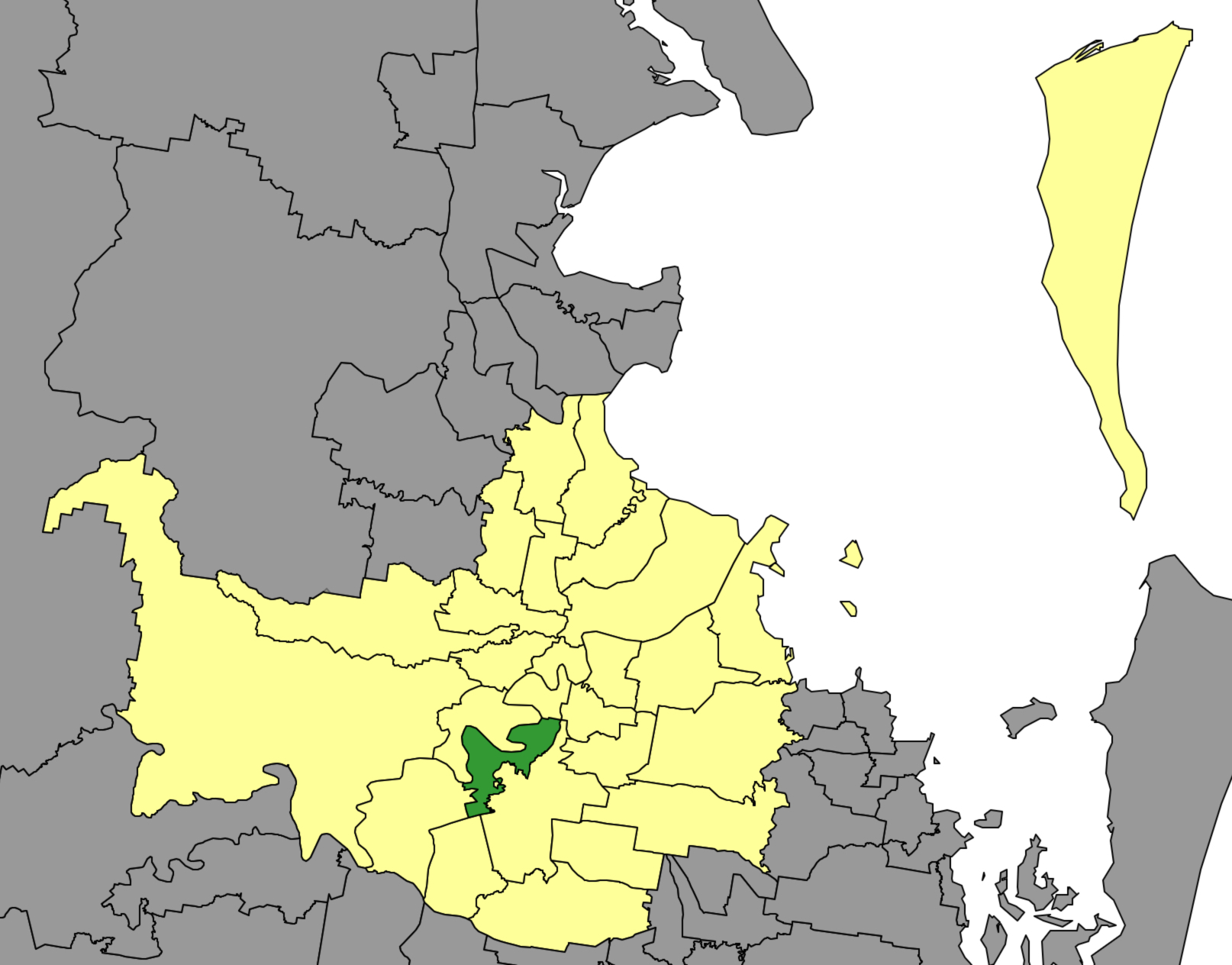
- Created: 2008
- Councillor: Nicole Johnston
- Party: Independent
- Namesake: Tennyson
- Electors: 30,371 (2024)
- Demographic: Inner metropolitan

Tennyson Ward is a Brisbane City Council ward covering Tennyson, Chelmer, Corinda, Fairfield, Graceville, Sherwood, Yeerongpilly and Yeronga, and parts of Annerley and Oxley.

== Councillors for Tennyson Ward ==
Image	Member	Party	Term	Notes
	Nicole Johnston	Liberal	15 March 2008 – 26 July 2008	Resigned from the LNP in 2010 before she was "likely" going to be expelled; initially sat as an Independent Liberal. Incumbent
	Nicole Johnston	Liberal National	26 July 2008 – 20 May 2010	Resigned from the LNP in 2010 before she was "likely" going to be expelled; initially sat as an Independent Liberal. Incumbent
	Nicole Johnston	Independent Liberal	20 May 2010 – 28 April 2012	Resigned from the LNP in 2010 before she was "likely" going to be expelled; initially sat as an Independent Liberal. Incumbent
	Nicole Johnston	Independent	28 April 2012 – present	Resigned from the LNP in 2010 before she was "likely" going to be expelled; initially sat as an Independent Liberal. Incumbent

== Results ==
=== 2024 ===
2024 Queensland local elections: Tennyson Ward
Party	Candidate	Votes	%	±%
Independent	Nicole Johnston	13,991	53.92	+2.86
Liberal National	Henry Swindon	4,844	18.67	−0.72
Greens	River Kearns	4,233	16.31	+2.82
Labor	Kane Hart	2,881	11.10	−3.07
Total formal votes		25,949	98.50	+0.14
Informal votes		396	1.5	−0.14
Turnout		26,345	86.74	+7.57
Two-candidate-preferred result
Independent	Nicole Johnston	17,799	75.90	+2.5
Liberal National	Henry Swindon	5,652	24.10	−2.5
Independent hold		Swing	+2.5	

=== 2020 ===
2020 Queensland local elections: Tennyson Ward
Party	Candidate	Votes	%	±%
Independent	Nicole Johnston	11,571	51.1	−0.1
Liberal National	Maurice Lane	4,394	19.4	+0.4
Labor	Jackie Schneider	3,212	14.2	−2.5
Greens	Patsy O'Brien	3,058	13.5	+0.3
Animal Justice	Darryl Prout	428	1.9	+1.9
Total formal votes		22,663	98.3	+0.5
Informal votes		383	1.7	−0.5
Turnout		23,046	79.2	
Notional two-party-preferred count
Liberal National	Maurice Lane	8,756	58.1	+3.4
Labor	Jackie Schneider	6,307	41.9	−3.4
Two-party-preferred result
Independent	Nicole Johnston	14,253	73.4	+0.4
Liberal National	Maurice Lane	5,155	26.6	+26.6
Independent hold		Swing	+0.4	

=== 2016 ===
2016 Queensland local elections: Tennyson Ward
Party	Candidate	Votes	%	±%
Independent	Nicole Johnston	12,572	55.4	+14.3
Liberal National	Ashley Higgins	3,794	16.7	−20.3
Labor	Stephen Harvey	3,335	14.7	+2.4
Greens	Gillian Marshall-Pierce	2,985	13.2	+3.5
Total formal votes		22,686	-	−
Informal votes		484	-	−
Turnout		23,170	-	−
Notional two-party-preferred count
Labor	Stephen Harvey		53.2	
Liberal National	Ashley Higgins		46.8	
Two-party-preferred result
Independent	Nicole Johnston	14,150	76.3	+20.5
Labor	Stephen Harvey	4,404	23.7	+23.7
Independent hold		Swing	+20.5	
