= Northgate Ward =

Brisbane City Council ward

Northgate Ward Queensland — Brisbane City Council
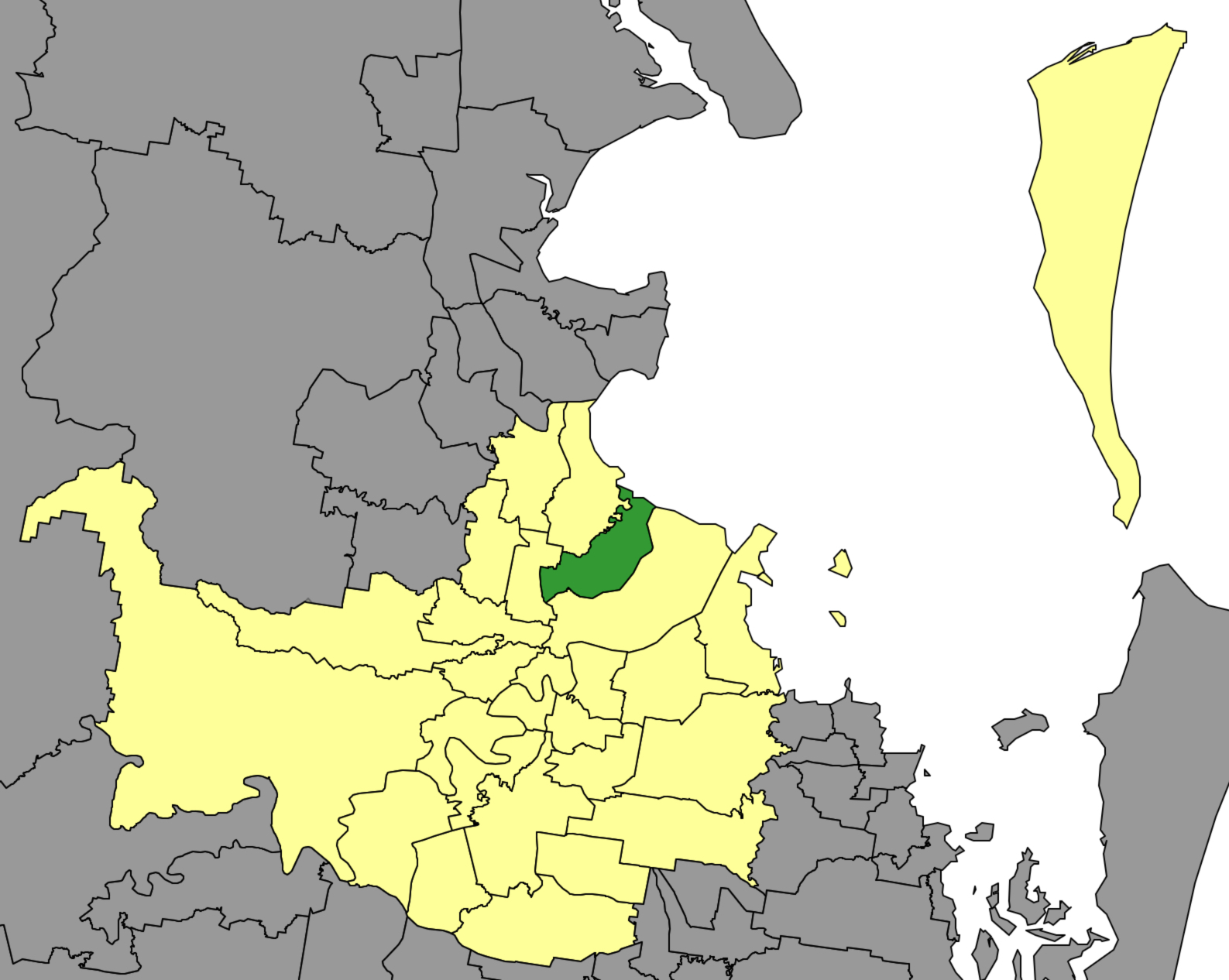
- Created: 1994
- Councillor: Adam Allan
- Party: Liberal National
- Namesake: Northgate
- Electors: 33,544 (2024)

Northgate Ward is a Brisbane City Council ward covering Northgate, Banyo, Nudgee, Nudgee Beach, Nundah, Virginia, Wavell Heights, and parts of Chermside and Kedron.

== Councillors for Northgate Ward ==
Member	Party	Term
Patricia Vaughan	Labor	1994–1997
Kim Flesser	Labor	1997–2016
Adam Allan	Liberal National	2016–present

== Results ==
=== 2024 ===
2024 Queensland local elections: Northgate Ward
Party	Candidate	Votes	%	±%
Liberal National	Adam Allan	12,930	45.89	−0.81
Labor	Vicki Ryan	9,725	34.42	−1.88
Greens	Tiana Peneha	5,520	19.59	+2.69
Total formal votes		28,175	97.94	
Informal votes		593	2.06	
Turnout		28,768	97.94	
Two-party-preferred result
Liberal National	Adam Allan	13,472	50.81	−0.99
Labor	Vicki Ryan	13,041	49.19	+0.99
Liberal National hold		Swing	−0.99	

=== 2020 ===
2020 Queensland local elections: Northgate Ward
Party	Candidate	Votes	%	±%
Liberal National	Adam Allan	11,315	46.7	+0.2
Labor	Reg Neil	8,810	36.4	−2.8
Greens	Jim Davies	4,106	16.9	+2.6
Total formal votes		24,231		
Informal votes		666		
Turnout		24,897		
Two-party-preferred result
Liberal National	Adam Allan	11,750	51.9	+0.3
Labor	Reg Neil	10,911	48.1	−0.3
Liberal National hold		Swing	+0.3	

=== 2016 ===
2016 Queensland local elections: Northgate Ward
Party	Candidate	Votes	%	±%
Liberal National	Adam Allan	11,456	46.7	−3
Labor	Reg Neil	9,581	39	−11.3
Greens	James Davis	3,499	14.3	+14.3
Total formal votes		24,536	-	−
Informal votes		712	-	−
Turnout		25,248	-	−
Two-party-preferred result
Liberal National	Adam Allan	11,796	51.7	+2.1
Labor	Reg Neil	11,018	48.3	−2.1
Liberal National gain from Labor		Swing	+2.1	

=== 2012 ===
2012 Brisbane City Council election: Northgate Ward
Party	Candidate	Votes	%	±%
Labor	Kim Flesser	10,622	50.36	+3.46
Liberal National	Laurie Bell	10,470	49.64	+4.57
Total formal votes		21,092	97.56	−0.68
Informal votes		527	2.44	+0.68
Turnout		21,619	82.70	−4.41
Two-party-preferred result
Labor	Kim Flesser	10,622	50.36	−1.19
Liberal National	Laurie Bell	10,470	49.64	+1.19
Labor hold		Swing		

=== 2008 ===
2008 Queensland local elections: Northgate Ward
Party	Candidate	Votes	%	±%
Labor	Kim Flesser	10,149	46.90	−2.21
Liberal	Kevin Parer	9,752	45.07	+5.84
Greens	Rory Dobson	1,737	8.03	−3.63
Total formal votes		21,638	98.24	+0.13
Informal votes		388	1.76	−0.13
Turnout		22,026	87.10	+0.46
Two-party-preferred result
Labor	Kim Flesser	10,611	51.55	−4.33
Liberal	Kevin Parer	9,972	48.45	+4.33
Labor hold		Swing		

=== 2004 ===
2004 Brisbane City Council election: Northgate Ward
Party	Candidate	Votes	%	±%
Labor	Kim Flesser	9,439	49.12	
Liberal	Kevin Parer	7,537	39.22	
Greens	Sue Meehan	2,241	11.66	
Total formal votes		19,217	98.11	
Informal votes		371	1.89	
Turnout		19,588	86.64	
Two-party-preferred result
Labor	Kim Flesser	9,990	55.88	
Liberal	Kevin Parer	7,887	44.12	
Labor hold		Swing		
