= Brisbane City Council =

Local government for the City of Brisbane, Queensland, Australia

City council overview
- Formed: 30 October 1924; 101 years ago
- Jurisdiction: City of Brisbane
- Employees: ▲8,233 (2019)
- Annual budget: ▲$4 billion (2022–23)
- City council executives: Adrian Schrinner, Lord Mayor of Brisbane; Fiona Cunningham, Deputy Mayor of Brisbane; Colin Jensen, Chief Executive Officer; Ainsley Gold, Executive Officer to the CEO
- Key document: City of Brisbane Act 2010 (Qld)
- Website: www.brisbane.qld.gov.au
- ASN: 18255
- 31st Council
- Coat of Arms

Type
- Type: Unicameral

History
- Founded: 1924; 102 years ago
- Preceded by: 20 Councils: Brisbane City Council; South Brisbane City Council; Hamilton Town Council; Ithaca Town Council; Sandgate Town Council; Toowong Town Council; Windsor Town Council; Wynnum Town Council; Balmoral Shire Council; Belmont Shire Council; Coorparoo Shire Council; Enoggera Shire Council; Kedron Shire Council; Moggill Shire Council; Sherwood Shire Council; Stephens Shire Council; Taringa Shire Council; Tingalpa Shire Council; Toombul Shire Council; Yeerongpilly Shire Council

Leadership
- Lord Mayor: Adrian Schrinner, Liberal National
- Deputy Mayor: Fiona Cunningham, Liberal National
- Leader of the Opposition: Jared Cassidy, Labor
- Chair of Council: Sandy Landers, Liberal National
- Deputy Chair of Council: Steven Huang, Liberal National

Structure
- Seats: 27 elected representatives including Lord Mayor and 26 Ward Councillors
- Political groups: Majority (19); Liberal National (19); Opposition (8); Labor (5); Greens (2); Independent (1)
- Committees: 10
- Length of term: 4 years
- Salary: A$164,156 (2021) (Note: A city Councillor that does not hold the Mayoralty, Deputy Mayoralty, a Civic Cabinet Chair position, Chair of Council, or Leader of the Opposition positions has the base salary of A$164,156 excluding allowances.)

Elections
- Voting system: Optional preferential voting
- First election: 21 February 1925
- Last election: 16 March 2024
- Next election: 25 March 2028

Motto
- Meliora Sequimur ('We aim for the best')

Meeting place
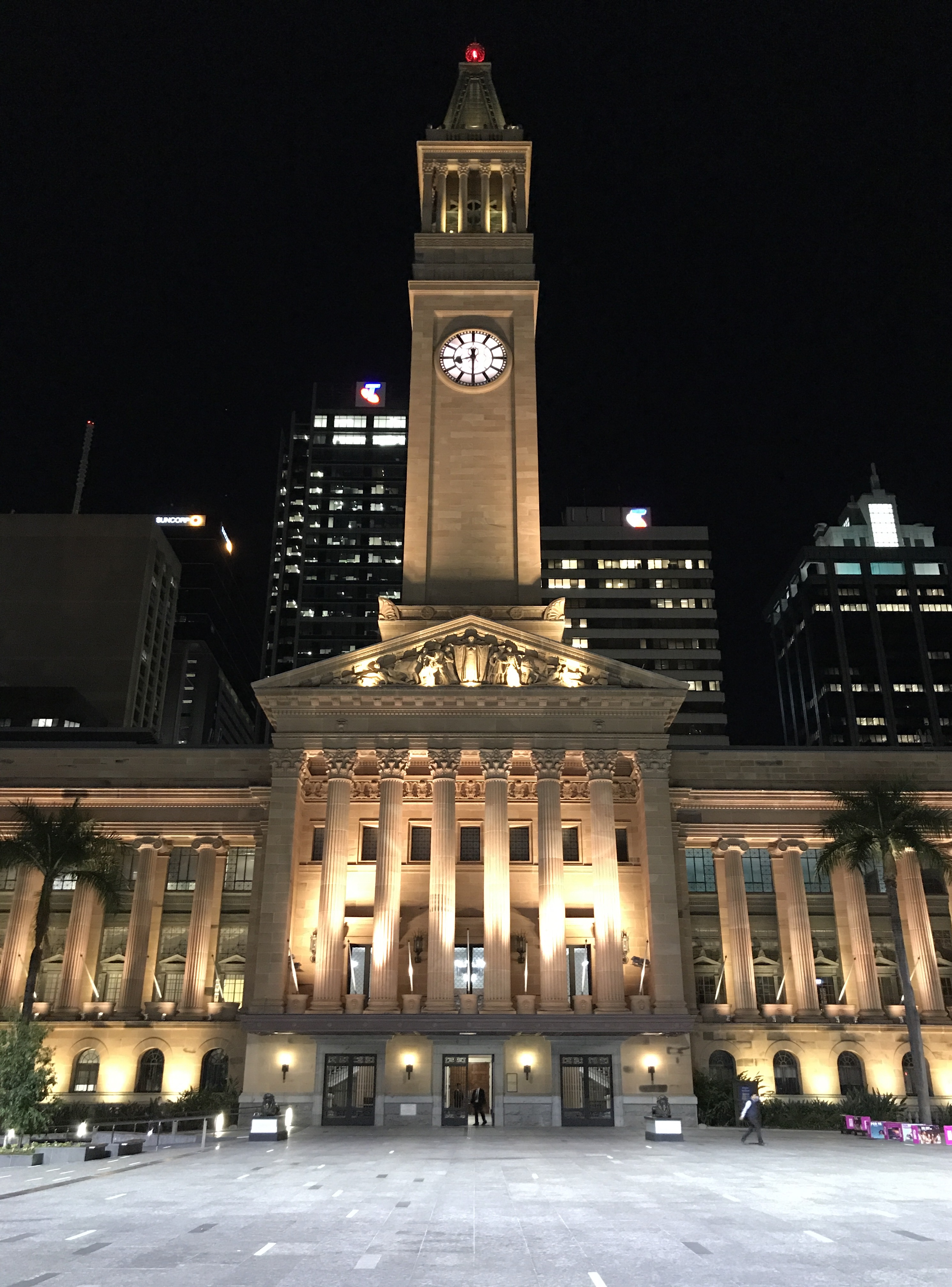
- Brisbane City Hall, King George Square, Brisbane

Brisbane City Council (BCC, also known as Council) is the local government of the City of Brisbane, the capital city of the Australian state of Queensland. The largest local government in Australia by population, BCC is composed of 27 elected councillors and has a jurisdiction covering 26 wards and 1,338 km^{2} (517 mi^{2}). (Note: This is not to say that Brisbane itself is the largest city in Australia (which is Sydney). Most other cities have a "City of xyz Council" that only covers that city's CBD unlike Brisbane, which covers all surrounding suburbs. Hence, BCC had an abnormally large population count simply because the population lies within one city council area.) Brisbane City Council consists of 26 councillors (elected or appointed to represent wards) and the Lord Mayor (currently Adrian Schrinner) who is elected by the city as a whole and is entitled to style themselves as a councillor ex officio. By resolution, the council may make local laws (previously known as ordinances). The Lord Mayor is responsible for key executive functions of the council, such as implementing policies, preparing the budget and directing senior employees. They are supported by the Civic Cabinet (formally the Establishment and Coordination (E&C) Committee), whose members are drawn from the council and chair each of the standing committees. The council's current CEO is Colin Jensen, supported by EO Ainsley Gold.

== Strategy ==
Brisbane City Council is guided by two core future planning documents: Brisbane's Future Blueprint (infrastructure, cultural, and capital works projects), and Brisbane Vision 2031 (corporate and city planning). Council also does more frequent but smaller scale community consultations through the Your City Your Say platform.

=== Brisbane Future Blueprint ===
Brisbane's Future Blueprint is a community-developed document, released in June 2018, outlining what the city council's goals should be. One in five households in Brisbane, representing every suburb, responded to the community consultation, totalling over 100,000 responses. More than 15,000 unique suggestions to improve Brisbane were put forward. The Blueprint provides for eight principles and 40 specific actions to make Brisbane a "friendly and liveable city":

1. Create a city of neighbourhoods
2. Protect and create greenspace
3. Create more to see and do
4. Protect the Brisbane backyard and our unique character
5. Ensure best practice design that complements the character of Brisbane
6. Empower and engage residents
7. Get people home quicker and safer with more travel options
8. Give people more choice when it comes to housing

=== Brisbane Vision 2031 ===
Brisbane Vision 2031 is the city council's long-term plan for developing Brisbane City. It outlines an additional eight principles to consider in developing council policy and supplements the city council's corporate plan 2016–17 and 2020–21.

== Structure ==
=== Lord Mayor ===
The Lord Mayor of Brisbane holds a role as the Chief Elected Executive of the Brisbane City Council, parallel to the role of the Chief Executive Officer, which is held by a civilian employee of the council. The Lord Mayor has a four-year term between elections, coinciding with general councillor elections. The current Lord Mayor of Brisbane is Adrian Schrinner of the Liberal National Party, supported by Krista Adams, the Deputy Mayor.

=== Council of Brisbane ===
The Council of Brisbane is the high-level administrative board of Brisbane City Council, composed of all elected councillors in the City of Brisbane. There are 27 councillors, 26 from electoral wards in Brisbane and the Lord Mayor.

Ordinary meetings of the council are held in the City Hall Council Chamber, 64 Adelaide Street, Brisbane. Meetings are on Tuesdays at 1pm (except during recess periods).

The Chair of Council, elected by the Councillors, presides over each meeting. The Lord Mayor does not chair the proceedings. The current Chair of Council is the Councillor David McLachlan.

=== Standing Committees ===
Brisbane City Council has ten standing committees made up of and chaired by elected representatives. Each committee considers Council policies, provides advice to council and delivers results for the people of Brisbane. This includes a wide range of areas such as infrastructure, public transport and the environment. With the exception of the Establishment and Coordination Committee (also known as Civic Cabinet), the public are welcome to attend council and standing committee meetings.

Since August 2021, the standing committees of Council include:

- Establishment and Coordination Committee (Civic Cabinet)
- City Planning and Suburban Renewal
- City Standards Committee
- Community, Arts and Nighttime Economy Committee
- Councillor Ethics Committee
- Economic Development and the Brisbane 2032 Olympic and Paralympic Games Committee
- Environment, Parks and Sustainability Committee
- Finance and City Governance Committee
- Infrastructure Committee
- Transport Committee

Most standing committee meetings are held on Tuesday mornings while Council is in session.

=== Civic Cabinet ===
The chair of each standing committee is also a member of council's Establishment and Coordination Committee, more commonly known as Civic Cabinet. At its highest level, Civic Cabinet sets the strategic direction for Brisbane as a city and council as an organisation. The Civic Cabinet has been delegated significant responsibility by full council. Civic Cabinet meets weekly to discuss policies and strategies in areas such as major projects, finance, urban planning, transport, environment, community services and city businesses.

It is in this way that Civic Cabinet sets the strategic direction for Brisbane as a city and for Brisbane City Council as an organisation. The members of Civic Cabinet review and make recommendations to full council on major plans such as council's vision, City Plan, corporate documents and city finances.

==== Members of Civic Cabinet ====
The following councillors were appointed members of Civic Cabinet in April 2024:

- Lord Mayor, Councillor Adrian Schrinner, City Treasurer and Chair of Civic Cabinet
- Councillor Krista Adams, Civic Cabinet Chair for Economic Development, Nighttime Economy and the Brisbane 2032 Olympic and Paralympic Games
- Councillor Adam Allan, Civic Cabinet Chair for City Planning and Suburban Renewal, Chair of the Councillor Ethics Committee
- Deputy Mayor, Councillor Fiona Cunningham, Civic Cabinet Chair for Finance and City Governance
- Councillor Tracy Davis, Civic Cabinet Chair for Environment, Parks and Sustainability
- Councillor Vicki Howard, Civic Cabinet Chair for Community and Arts
- Councillor Sarah Hutton, Civic Cabinet Chair for City Standards
- Councillor Ryan Murphy, Civic Cabinet Chair for Transport
- Councillor Andrew Wines, Civic Cabinet Chair for Infrastructure

The Lord Mayor is the chair of Civic Cabinet. The Chief Executive Officer (CEO) acts as secretary of E&C, provides executive advice and reports back to Council as an organisation.

Each Civic Cabinet Chair works alongside its relevant organisational divisions to "consider Council policy, provide advice to Council and delivers results for the people of Brisbane."

=== Organisational divisions ===
Within Brisbane City Council, there are six different organisational divisions representing the core tasks of the council. Each division had its own Divisional Manager, who is accountable to the Council of Brisbane, the Civil Cabinet, and the CEO. As of February 2023, the six divisions and their divisional managers are:

- City Administration and Governance – Tim Wright
- Organisational Services – Anne Lenz
- City Planning and Sustainability – David Chick
- Lifestyle and Community Services – Tash Tobias
- Transport for Brisbane – Samantha Abeydeera
- Brisbane Infrastructure – Scott Stewart

These divisions are organisational, meaning that they're not subject to the changes in the elected administration nor are elected themselves.

=== Current composition ===
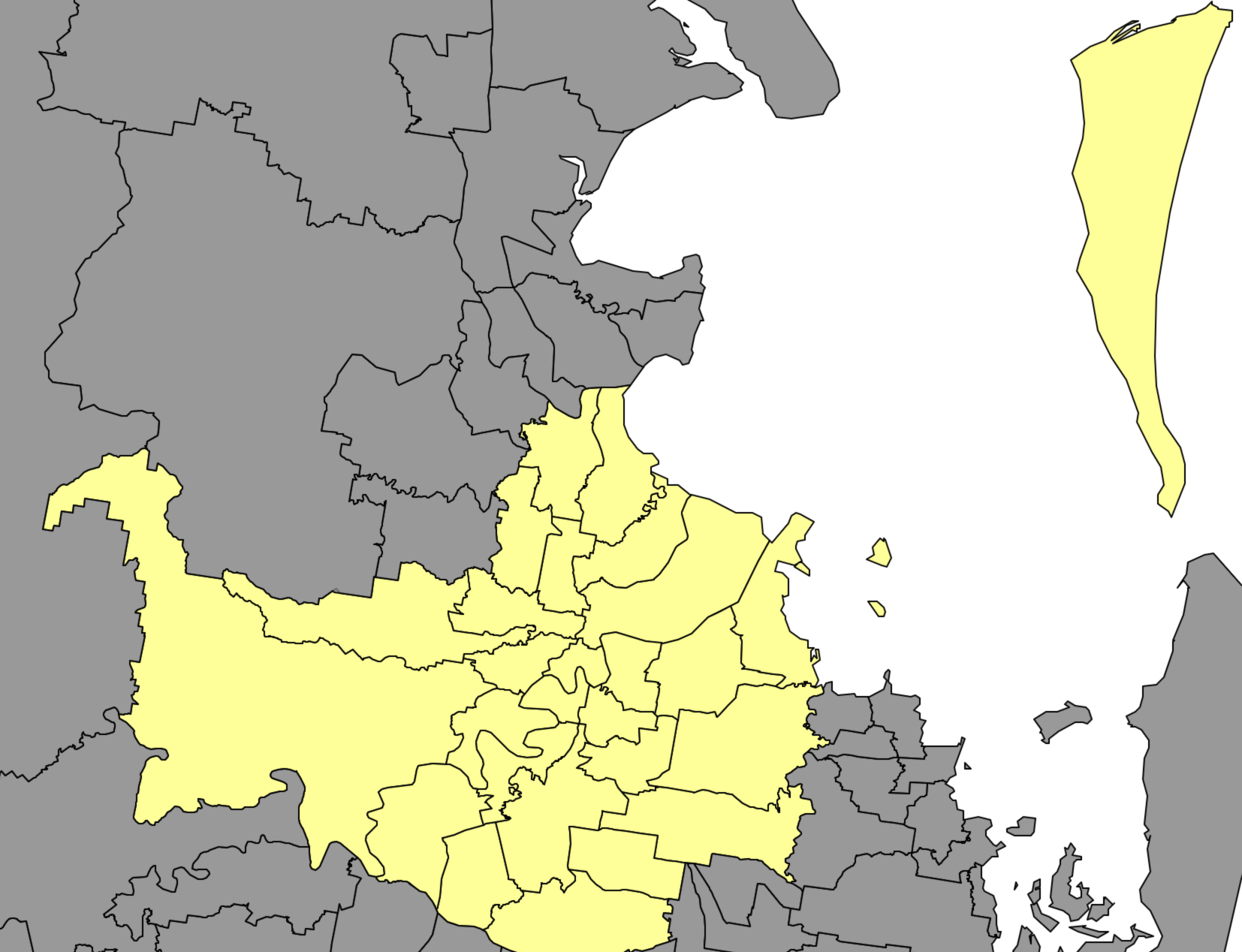
A map showing the wards of Brisbane.

Party totals
Party	Wards	Lord Mayor
Liberal National	18	1
Labor	5	
Greens	2	
Independent	1	

The current council is
Ward	Party	Councillor
Lord Mayor	LNP	Adrian Schrinner
Bracken Ridge	LNP	Sandy Landers
Calamvale	Labor	Emily Kim
Central	LNP	Vicki Howard
Chandler	LNP	Ryan Murphy
Coorparoo	LNP	Fiona Cunningham
Deagon	Labor	Jared Cassidy
Doboy	LNP	Lisa Atwood
Enoggera	LNP	Andrew Wines
Forest Lake	Labor	Charles Strunk
Hamilton	LNP	Julia Dixon
Holland Park	LNP	Krista Adams
Jamboree	LNP	Sarah Hutton
MacGregor	LNP	Steven Huang
Marchant	LNP	Danita Parry
McDowall	LNP	Tracy Davis
Moorooka	Labor	Steve Griffiths
Morningside	Labor	Lucy Collier
Northgate	LNP	Adam Allan
Paddington	Greens	Seal Chong Wah
Pullenvale	LNP	Greg Adermann
Runcorn	LNP	Kim Marx
Tennyson	Independent	Nicole Johnston
The Gabba	Greens	Trina Massey
The Gap	LNP	Steve Toomey
Walter Taylor	LNP	Penny Wolff
Wynnum Manly	LNP	Alex Givney

== History ==
=== Pre-1900s ===
- 1823: John Oxley names the Brisbane River after Sir Thomas Brisbane, Governor of New South Wales from 1821 to 1825.
- 1842–1880: Civilians start occupying Brisbane, making it the main site of commerce for the region.
- 3 October 1859: The first elections for the Mayor of Brisbane are held, following the declaration of Brisbane as a local government municipality named after the river on which it sits. John Petrie was unanimously elected out of 37 candidates.

=== 1900s ===
- 1924: The Parliament of Queensland passes the City of Brisbane Act, creating a single city council for all the City of Brisbane, rather than the previous 20 various authorities and boards.
- 1 October 1925: The new City Council is begins operation, under its first Mayor of Brisbane, William Jolly.
- 8 April 1930: Governor of Queensland, John Goodwin officially opens the Brisbane City Hall.
- 1939: Brisbane is made the headquarters of Allies of World War II in the South Pacific for Australian and American service personnel. The original offices are now part of the MacArthur Chambers.
- 1982: Brisbane hosts the Commonwealth Games.
- 1988: Brisbane hosts Expo 88, giving birth to South Bank Parklands, the now central cultural area of Brisbane and home of the Brisbane City Council head office.

=== 2000s ===
- 1 July 2010: The Legislative Assembly of Queensland passes the City of Brisbane Act 2010 as part of a state-wide review of local government legislation, formalising and consolidating state legislation about the City of Brisbane.
- 2010–2013: Brisbane City Hall reopens after significant restoration and renovation.
- November 2014: Brisbane hosts the G20 Leaders Summit.

== See also ==
- List of mayors and lord mayors of Brisbane
- City of Brisbane
