= Deagon Ward =

Electoral ward of Brisbane, Australia

Deagon Ward Queensland — Brisbane City Council
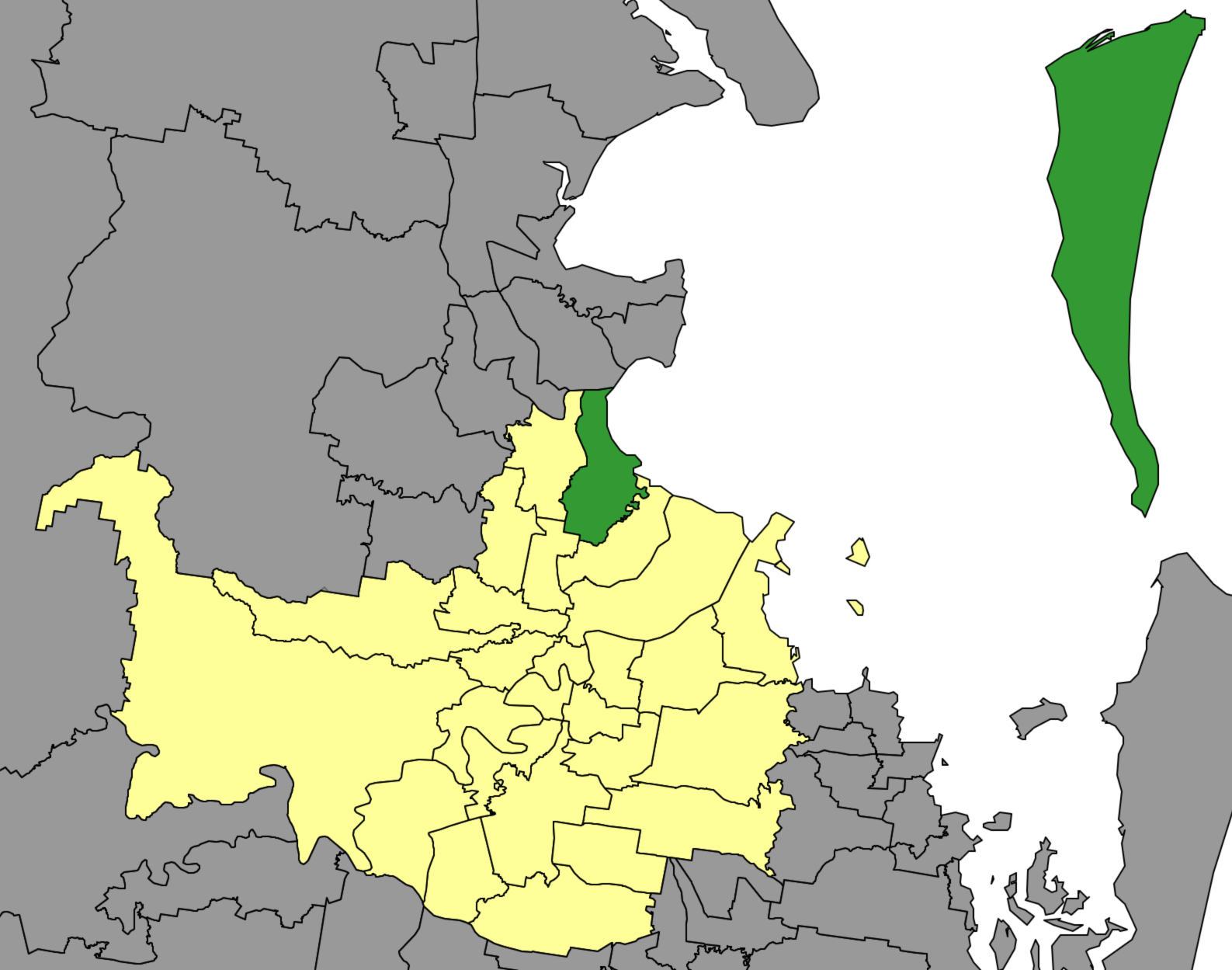
- Councillor: Jared Cassidy
- Party: Labor
- Namesake: Deagon
- Electors: 34,638 (2024)
- Demographic: Outer metropolitan

Deagon Ward is a Brisbane City Council ward covering Deagon, Boondall, Brighton, Sandgate, Shorncliffe, Taigum and parts of Geebung, Virginia and Zillmere.

The current councillor is Jared Cassidy, who has served as Leader of the Opposition and leader of the Labor Party on Brisbane City Council since 2019.

== Councillors for Deagon Ward ==
Image	Member	Party	Term	Notes
	Ken Leese	Labor	1985 – 28 March 1991	
	Denise Herbert	Labor	28 March 1991 – 25 March 2000	
	Victoria Newton	Labor	25 March 2000 – 17 August 2015	Retired
	Jared Cassidy	Labor	17 August 2015 – present	Leader of the Opposition and leader of the Labor Party since 2019. Incumbent

== Results ==
=== 2024 ===
2024 Queensland local elections: Deagon Ward
Party	Candidate	Votes	%	±%
Labor	Jared Cassidy	16,672	58.46	+7.12
Liberal National	Brock Alexander (disendorsed)	7,092	24.87	−10.01
Greens	Edward Naus	4,754	16.67	+5.20
Total formal votes		28,518	96.61	−0.77
Informal votes		1001	3.39	+0.77
Turnout		29,519	84.24	+3.09
Two-party-preferred result
Labor	Jared Cassidy	19,302	72.14	+10.64
Liberal National	Brock Alexander (disendorsed)	7,374	27.86	−10.64
Labor hold		Swing	+10.64	

=== 2020 ===
2020 Queensland local elections: Deagon Ward
Party	Candidate	Votes	%	±%
Labor	Jared Cassidy	13,127	51.3	+8.2
Liberal National	Kimberley Washington	8,919	34.9	−8.1
Greens	Anthony Walsh	2,935	11.5	−2.4
Motorists	Kathy Moloney	586	2.3	+2.3
Total formal votes		25,567		
Informal votes		688		
Turnout		26,255		
Two-party-preferred result
Labor	Jared Cassidy	14,818	61.5	+8.6
Liberal National	Kimberley Washington	9,284	38.5	−8.6
Labor hold		Swing	+8.6	

=== 2016 ===
2016 Queensland local elections: Deagon Ward
Party	Candidate	Votes	%	±%
Labor	Jared Cassidy	10,504	43.8	−4.9
Liberal National	Kerry Millard	10,095	42.1	+1.4
Greens	Anthony Walsh	3,359	14	+6.5
Total formal votes		23,958		
Informal votes		673		
Turnout		24,631		
Two-party-preferred result
Labor	Jared Cassidy	12,092	53.7	−1.4
Liberal National	Kerry Millard	10,406	46.3	+1.4
Labor hold		Swing	−1.4	

=== 2012 ===
2012 Brisbane City Council election: Deagon Ward
Party	Candidate	Votes	%	±%
Labor	Victoria Newton	7,838	49.8	−1.9
Liberal National	Gordana Blazevic	6,223	39.5	+1.5
Greens	Georgia Farrell	1202	7.6	+0.1
Independent	John Harbison	486	3.1	+1.4
Total formal votes		14,733	-	−
Informal votes		408	-	−
Turnout		16,157	-	−
Two-party-preferred result
Labor	Victoria Newton	8,296	56.3	−1.6
Liberal National	Gordana Blazevic	6,440	43.7	+1.6
Labor hold		Swing	−1.6	

=== 2008 ===
2008 Brisbane City Council election: Deagon Ward
Party	Candidate	Votes	%	±%
Labor	Victoria Newton	11,305	51.66	−1.36
Liberal	Tony Feagan	8,315	38.00	+3.81
Greens	Peter Fagan	1,657	7.57	−5.22
Independent	John Harbison	368	1.68	+1.68
Independent	Jennifer Singfield	238	1.09	+1.09
Total formal votes		21,883	98.18	+0.38
Informal votes		405	1.82	−0.38
Turnout		22,288	87.54	−0.02
Two-party-preferred result
Labor	Victoria Newton	11,725	57.92	−3.07
Liberal	Tony Feagan	8,520	42.08	+3.07
Labor hold		Swing	−3.07	

=== 2004 ===
2004 Brisbane City Council election: Deagon Ward
Party	Candidate	Votes	%	±%
Labor	Victoria Newton	10,156	53.02	
Liberal	Zenia Belcher	6,549	34.19	
Greens	Peter Leonard Fagan	2,451	12.79	
Total formal votes		19,156	97.80	
Informal votes		431	2.20	
Turnout		19,587	87.56	
Two-party-preferred result
Labor	Victoria Newton	10,678	60.98	
Liberal	Zenia Belcher	6,832	39.02	
Labor hold		Swing		
