= Adrian Schrinner =

Australian politician (born 1977)

The Right Honourable Councillor Adrian Schrinner
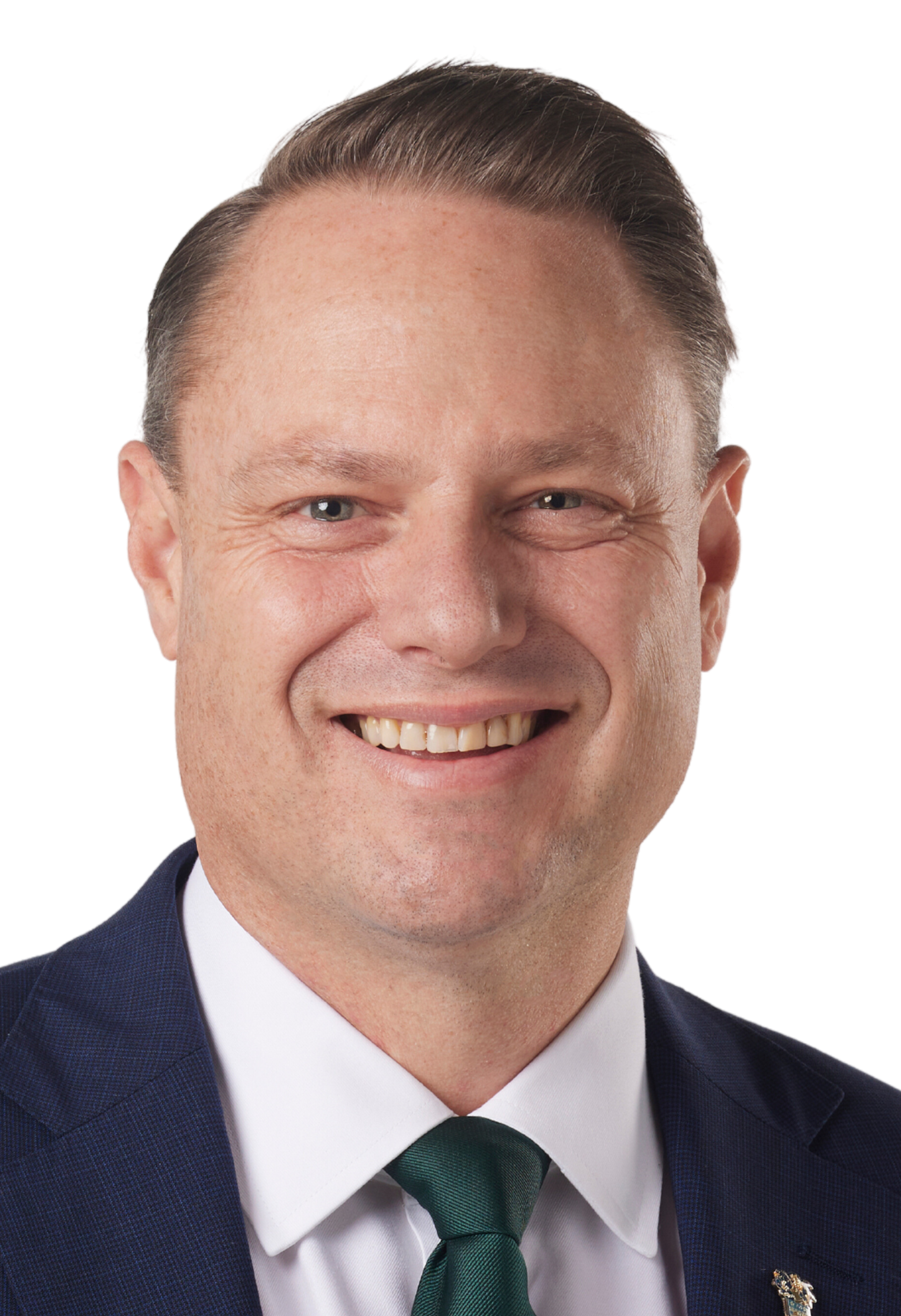

17th Lord Mayor of Brisbane
- Incumbent
- Assumed office 8 April 2019
- Deputy: Krista Adams (until 2025); Fiona Cunningham
- Preceded by: Graham Quirk

Deputy Lord Mayor of Brisbane
- In office 7 April 2011 – 8 April 2019
- Lord Mayor: Graham Quirk
- Preceded by: Graham Quirk
- Succeeded by: Krista Adams

Councillor of the City of Brisbane for Chandler Ward
- In office 10 September 2005 – 8 April 2019
- Preceded by: Michael Caltabiano
- Succeeded by: Ryan Murphy

Personal details
- Born: Adrian Jurgen Schrinner; 1977 (age 48–49) Brisbane, Queensland, Australia
- Party: Liberal National (since 2008)
- Other political affiliations: Liberal (1998−2008)
- Spouse: Nina Schrinner (m. 2007)
- Children: 4
- Parents: Jürgen Schrinner (father); Beryl Schrinner (mother)

Military service
- Allegiance: Australia
- Branch/service: Royal Australian Air Force (Note: During training and study at the Australian Defence Force Academy (ADFA).)
- Years of service: 1994–1997
- Rank: Officer Cadet

Adrian Jurgen Schrinner (born 1977) is an Australian politician who has served as the 17th Lord Mayor of Brisbane since 2019. He was first elected as the Councillor for Chandler Ward in 2005 and became a member of Civic Cabinet three years later. Schrinner became Deputy Mayor in 2011, and succeeded Graham Quirk as Lord Mayor in 2019, following his retirement from the council.

Prior to his entry into politics, Schrinner worked in his family's small cleaning business and was in the Royal Australian Air Force from 1995 to 1997.

Schrinner has advocated for Federal and State Government investment in road and transport infrastructure, a new Queensland trial of Daylight Saving Time and the opening of the Federal Government's empty Pinkenba Quarantine Facility for emergency accommodation during the Queensland housing crisis.

== Political career ==
Schrinner was elected as the Councillor for Chandler Ward in the 2005 by-election when the previous councillor Michael Caltabiano was elected to state parliament. In 2008, he was promoted to Civic Cabinet as the Chairman of the Finance and Administration Committee. This committee was later expanded to become the Finance, Administration and Economic Development Committee.

Following the resignation of Campbell Newman as Lord Mayor in March 2011, the Council appointed Deputy Mayor Graham Quirk to the role of Lord Mayor. At the same meeting, Schrinner became the youngest Deputy Mayor in Brisbane's history. While Deputy Mayor, Schrinner oversaw major projects such as the $1.5 billion Legacy Way Tunnel; open level crossing eliminations at Bald Hills and Geebung; reconstruction of the New Farm Riverwalk following the 2011 Queensland flood; a major reform of car parking management across the city, including the introduction of free 15-minute parking and the delivery of the 'Brisbane Metro' banana-bus project.

Schrinner succeeded Graham Quirk as Lord Mayor following Quirk's resignation in 2019.

== Mayor of Brisbane ==
In his inaugural speech as Lord Mayor, Schrinner announced the city's biggest investment in parks and green space and promised to make "the Brisbane of tomorrow even better than the Brisbane of today."

His first commitments as Lord Mayor included the construction of new green bridges and the city's biggest investment in parks and green space.

=== Parks and green space ===
When Schrinner first became Lord Mayor in 2019, he declared he would be a Lord Mayor who "champions extra parks for Brisbane and works to increase our green space."

Since then, work has begun on converting Victoria Park, previously a golf park, into publicly accessible parklands. and a 150-hectare park is being created at Archerfield Wetlands additionally work started on two sports and recreation precincts at Murarrie and Nudgee.

However, his decision to support the development of the Victoria Park Stadium for the 2032 Olympic Games in the city has raised concerns on his potential disruption of the ecosystem to the park.

In addition to this, more than 40,000 street trees have been planted across Brisbane since Schrinner became Lord Mayor and 4400 hectares of bushland have been preserved as part of the city's Bushland Acquisition Program.

In 2023, Schrinner also announced a plan to rehabilitate the city's two barren quarries at Mt Coot-tha and Mt Gravatt into green and recreational spaces.

=== Suburbs ===
In 2022, Schrinner announced a Suburbs First Guarantee, which would direct at least 80 per cent of all Council investment to be spent in Brisbane's suburbs.

In the 2023–24 Budget, 87 per cent of all spending will be spent in the suburbs.

=== Roads and transport ===
In 2019, Schrinner announced a pedestrian and cycle bridge-building program.

Construction on the Kangaroo Point green bridge began in 2021, with construction of the Breakfast Creek green bridge starting shortly after in 2022.

Since Schrinner took office, work on the electric "Brisbane Metro" articulated bus project has progressed with the first Brisbane Metro bus vehicle clocking up enough kilometres to travel between Brisbane and Sydney several times over during rigorous testing. The Brisbane Metro depot in Rochedale is also nearing completion, ready for Brisbane Metro services to commence in the 2024–25 financial year.

Schrinner has also discussed opportunities to expand Brisbane Metro east to Capalaba, north to Chermside and to Brisbane Airport with support from other levels of government.

Schrinner has supported the replacement of the Indooroopilly roundabout on Moggill Road with an overpass.

=== Homelessness policy ===
In March 2025, Schrinner announced that homeless individuals living in Brisbane's parks would have a 24-hour window to move on, after which their tents would be seized and removed. This announcement followed in the wake of a similar policy being enacted by the City of Moreton Bay. Schrinner insisted that anyone currently residing in Brisbane's parks was "choosing to be homeless" as the homeless population had been offered crisis housing during preparations for Cyclone Alfred. Various news sources disputed this claim, citing a claim by Karyn Walsh, CEO of Micah Projects (a nonprofit organisation that works with Queensland's Department of Housing to provide social housing) that some individuals who had applied for accommodation were ineligible due to lack of identification, and of those who had identification and had applied, only 71 out of 115 were actually offered accommodation. The average wait time for social housing in Queensland is 2.5 years.

== Personal life ==
Schrinner was raised in Brisbane's south-eastern suburbs by German father Jürgen and Australian mother Beryl.

An aviation enthusiast, Schrinner began working in his family's small cleaning business to fund flying lessons. When he was sixteen, he became qualified to fly light aircraft and commenced training to become an officer in the Royal Australian Air Force upon graduation from high school. He attributes his time at the Australian Defence Force Academy in Canberra sparked his interest in politics.

He completed a Bachelor of Arts through the University of Queensland while working as a cleaner and delivery driver.

Schrinner now lives in the suburb of Carindale, Queensland with his wife, Nina, and their four young children, Octavia, Wolfgang, Monash and Petra.
