= Lota, Queensland =

Lota
- Suburb
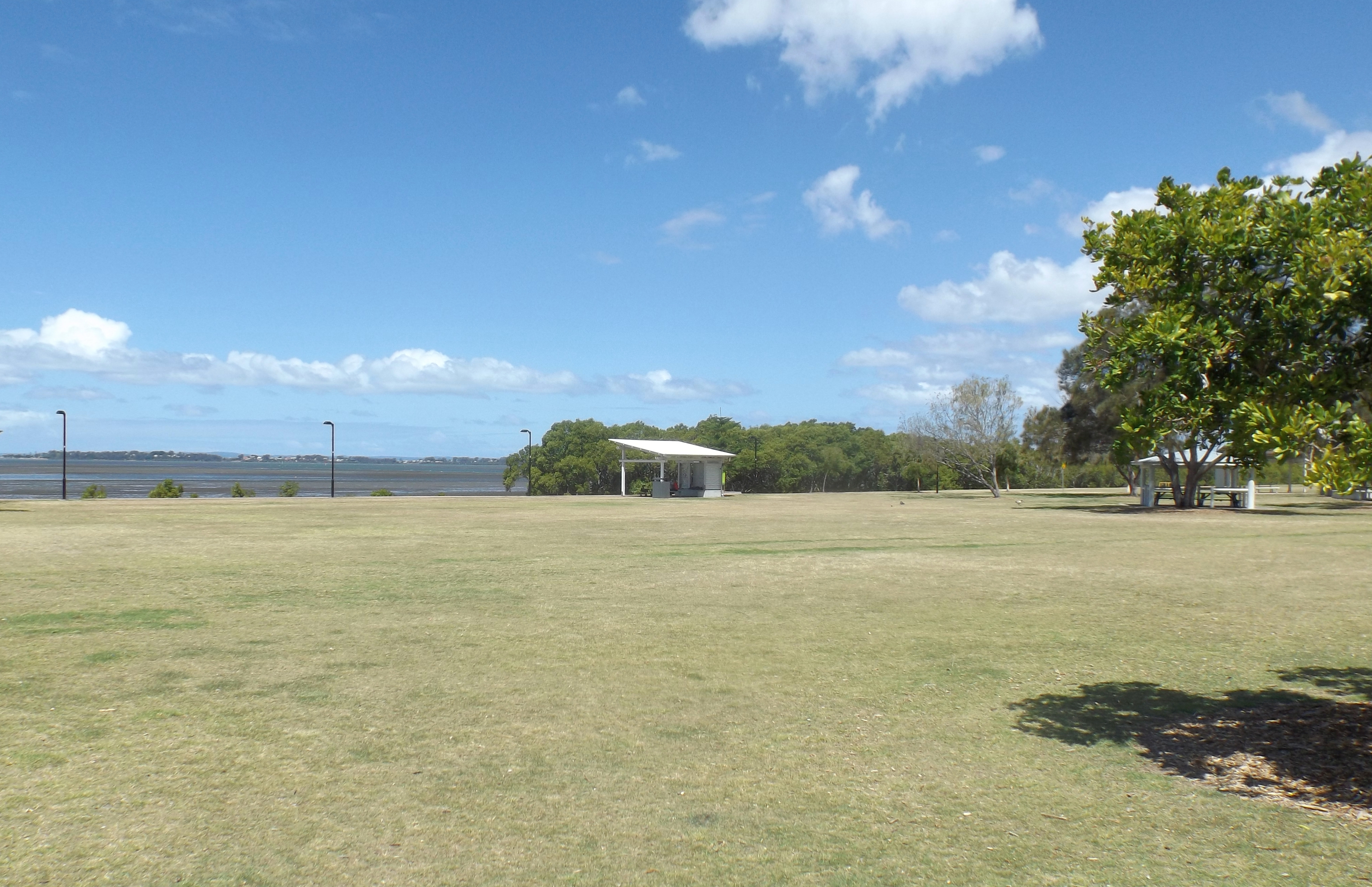
- Moreton Bay and foreshore reserve, 2014

- Interactive map of Lota
- Coordinates: 27.4663°S 153.1858°E
- Country: Australia
- State: Queensland
- City: Brisbane
- LGA: City of Brisbane (Wynnum Manly Ward)
- Location: 19.7 km (12.2 mi) E of Brisbane CBD

Government
  - State electorate: Lytton
  - Federal division: Bonner

Area
  - Total: 3.5 km^{2} (1.4 sq mi)

Population
  - Total: 3,518 (2021 census)
  - Density: 1,005/km^{2} (2,600/sq mi)
- Time zone: UTC+10:00 (AEST)
- Postcode: 4179
Suburbs around Lota
Manly West	Manly	Moreton Bay
Manly West	Lota	Moreton Bay
Wakerley	Ransome	Thorneside

Lota is an eastern bayside suburb in the City of Brisbane, Queensland, Australia. In the 2021 census, Lota had a population of 3,518 people.

== Geography ==
Lota is 19.7 kilometres (12.2 mi) by road east of the Brisbane CBD.

The coastline of the suburb has mudflats and mangrove wetlands extending into Moreton Bay. Lota Creek loosely bounds the suburb to the south and flows into Moreton Bay at the south-east of the suburb (27.4761°S 153.1915°E).

Fig Tree Point is a headland at the midpoint of the coastline (27.4693°S 153.1933°E).

The terrain ranges from 0 to 30 metres (0 to 98 ft) above sea level with the lower land along the eastern coast and along the creek to the south. The land rises towards the north and west.

The Cleveland railway line enters the suburb from the north-west (Manly West / Manly) and exits to the south across Lota Creek to Ransome. The suburb is served by Lota railway station on Railway Terrace in the south of the suburb (27.4701°S 153.1886°E). There is a pedestrian bridge over the railway line at the station (27.4699°S 153.1885°E).

The suburb is of primarily post-war residential make-up but is gradually being developed with modern beachside properties.

== History ==
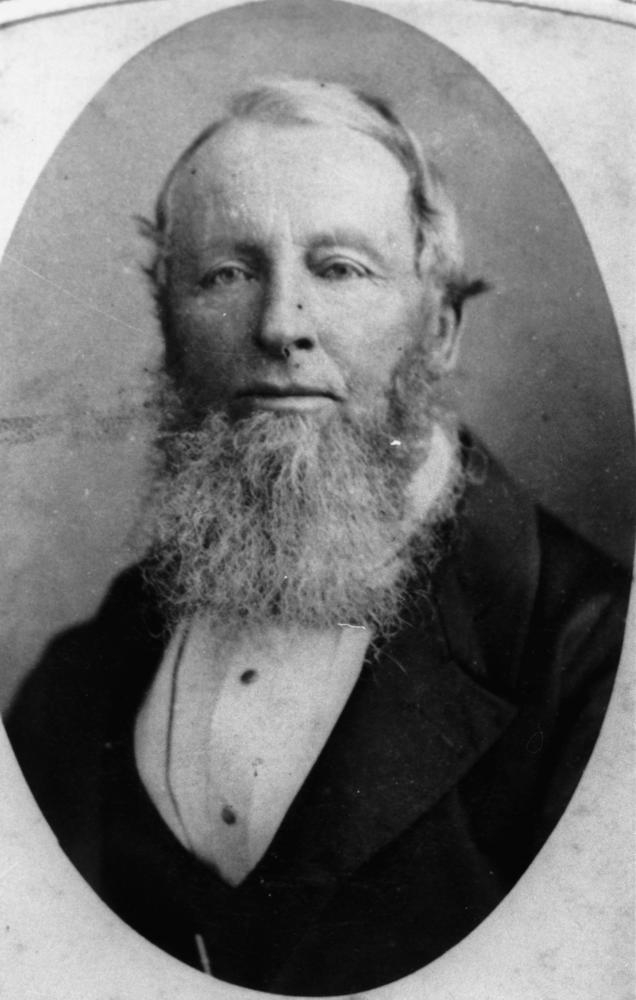
William Duckett White

This part of Moreton Bay was originally occupied by the semi-nomadic Mipirimm subclan of the Quandamooka people. Lota and neighbouring suburb Manly were and continue to be known as Narlung to the Quandamooka people, likely meaning 'the place of long shadows'. The name ningi ningi (meaning 'oysters') may also have been used in relation to the area of Lota near the creek. A major Quandamooka campsite in the area in the mid-1800s was Blacks Camp in Wynnum.

Lota was acquired by Irish-born politician and pastoralist William Duckett White in 1860, following sub-division of the lands from Lytton to Fig Tree Point. The first Queensland Premier, Robert Herbert, entered into a partnership with Duckett White for some of the land. The suburb is named after Duckett White's residence, Lota House, built in 1863. Lota House was the heart of a productive estate, with sugar cane and fodder grown on the flats near the creek and orchards planted on higher ground near Macdonald Street. Aboriginal and South Sea Islander people worked the property, camping to the west of Lota House. Duckett White's land was first subdivided in 1911 to the east of the present railway line. The Lota Park Estate, west of the line, was sold in 1918.

The first Cleveland railway line was opened in 1889 through Lota to Cleveland. In 1960, the railway line between Lota and Cleveland was closed, leaving Lota as the terminus until the re-opening of the line in stages between 1983 and 1987.

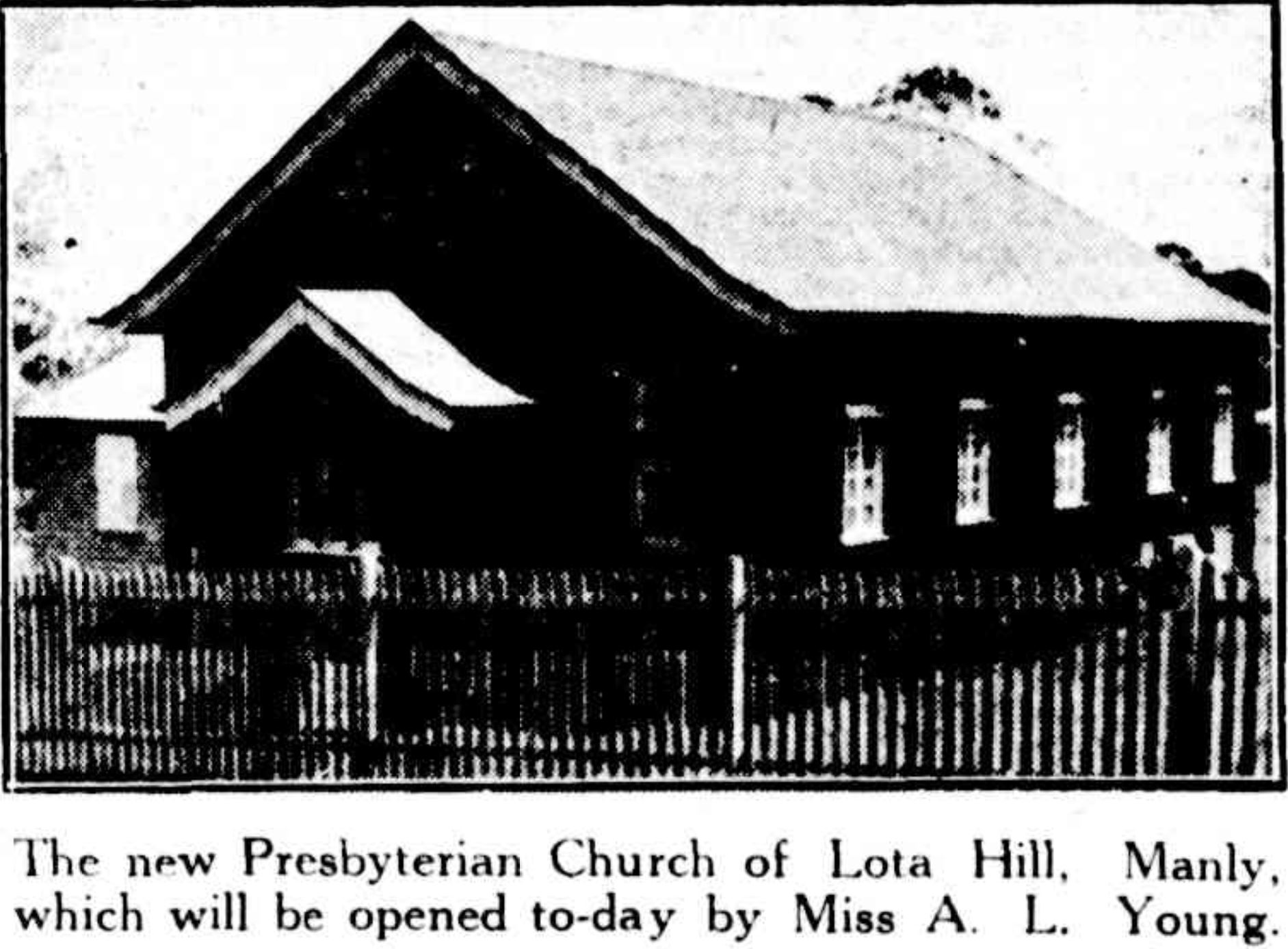
New Rix-Farmer Memorial Presbyterian Church, 1931

In February 1918, a Presbyterian Sunday School was established by Mrs Alice Rix, who purchased a piece of land with a cottage and altered it to be suited to a Sunday School. As churches services were also held in the building, a larger building was needed and the congregation was unsure whether to enlarge the existing building or construct a new church at greater expense. In September 1928, the existing building re-opened following an enlargement. However, the death Mrs Elizabeth Annie Farmer of Macdonald Street, Lota, on 16 June 1930 resulted in a bequest of £300 to the church. The congregation was also able to borrow £200 from the Presbyterian Extension Fund (an initiative of Presbyterian benefactor William Robert Black to assist fledgling Presbyterian churches). These sources of funding enabled the congregation build a new church. Impressed by the Cannon Hill Presbyterian Church built in 1930, the congregation engaged its architect George Trotter to build them a similar church. On Saturday 8 August 1931, Lord Mayor John William Greene presided over a stump-capping ceremony for the new church. The Rix-Farmer Memorial Presbyterian Church was officially opened on Saturday 24 October 1931 by Miss Annie Leighton Young, a niece of Mrs Alice Rix. The dedication was performed by Reverend Robert Millar. On Saturday 16 September 1933, the church hall (the original extended building on the site) burned down; a new hall was opened on Saturday 2 June 1934 by Miss Annie Leighton Young.

In 1921, Lota Methodist Church opened at 29 Ambool Street (27.4698°S 153.1907°E). It was sold in 1982 as part of rationalising the portfolio of church properties resulting from the amalgamation of Methodist, Presbyterian and Congregational Churches into the Uniting Church in Australia. The church building is still extant but is used as a house.

Lota School of Arts opened on the corner of Alexander and MacDonald Streets in 1927, and played host to dance evenings, film screenings and classes.

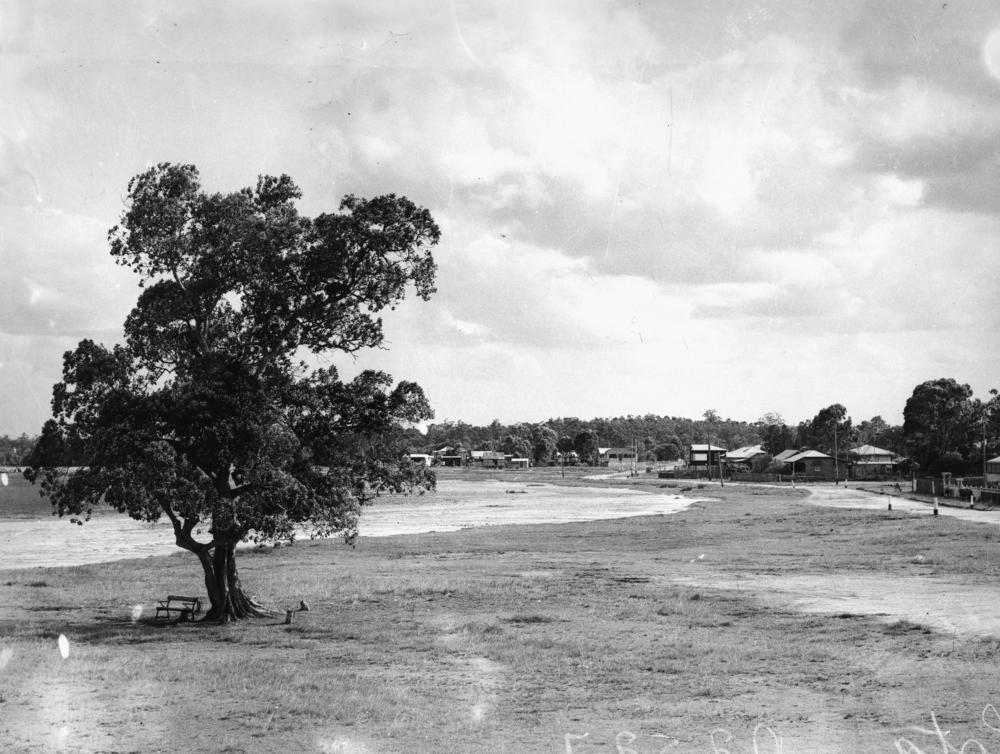
Lota, near the foreshore, circa 1935

In 1931, Great Depression 'relief work' led to the reclamation of land along the Esplanade, and the building of Lota's seawall.

Lota State School opened on 29 January 1952.

In 1954, the Bayside United Sports and Recreation Club opened at Cox Park to provide opportunities for local children to play soccer, badminton, table tennis, basketball and fencing. Circa 1971, it split into the Wondall United Soccer Club while the other sports were conducted by the Police & Citizens Youth Club. In 1974, a number of local soccer teams amalgamated into the Bayside United Football Club, still playing at Cox Park until the 1984 when the club moved to the Don Randall Oval which was built on reclaimed land and had been used as a rubbish tip. The oval was named after local alderman Don Randall.

The former St Agnes' Anglican Church on The Esplanade (near Orallo Street, approx 27.4682°S 153.19269°E) was dedicated on 16 May 1957 by Archbishop Halse. Its closure was approved on 21 January 1994 by Assistant Bishop Ron Williams. The building was moved to Alexandra Hills Parish.

Despite the name, Wynnum Hospital opened in 1982 at 150 Whites Road in Lota (27.4640°S 153.1820°E). Wynnum Ambulance Station was on the same site (27.4650°S 153.1820°E). They closed in 2013, being replaced in 2015 by the Wynnum-Manly Gundu-Pa Community Health Centre in Wynnum West with adjacent ambulance station. In 2023, the old hospital site in Lota was proposed to be redeveloped as an Indigenous aged care and wellness facility.

Bayside Uniting Church was established in 1990 in Wondall Road, Manly West, combining four Uniting Churches located at:

- Ashton Street, Wynnum, a former Methodist Church
- Kingsley Terrace, Manly, a former Methodist Church
- Preston Road, Manly West, a former Methodist Church
- Yamboyna Street, Manly, a former Congregational Church

Due to earlier or later closures, the Bayside Uniting Church also incorporated congregations from:

- "The Springs" Methodist Church in Manly Road, Manly West
- Lota Methodist Church in Ambool Street, Lota
- Lindum Methodist Church at Sibley Road, Wynnum West
- Hemmant Methodist Church in Hemmant-Tingalpa Road, Hemmant

== Demographics ==
In the 2011 census, Lota had a population of 3,255 people.

In the 2016 census, Lota had a population of 3,256 people. The median age of the Lota population was 41 years of age, three years above the Australian median. 74.3% of people living in Lota were born in Australia, compared to the national average of 66.7%; the next most common countries of birth were England 7.3%, New Zealand 6.0%, South Africa 1.7%, Scotland 1.3%, Ireland 0.7%. 92.9% of people spoke only English at home; the next most common languages were 0.7% German, 0.4% Mandarin, 0.3% French, 0.3% Dutch and 0.3% Japanese.

In the 2021 census, Lota had a population of 3,518 people.

== Heritage listings ==
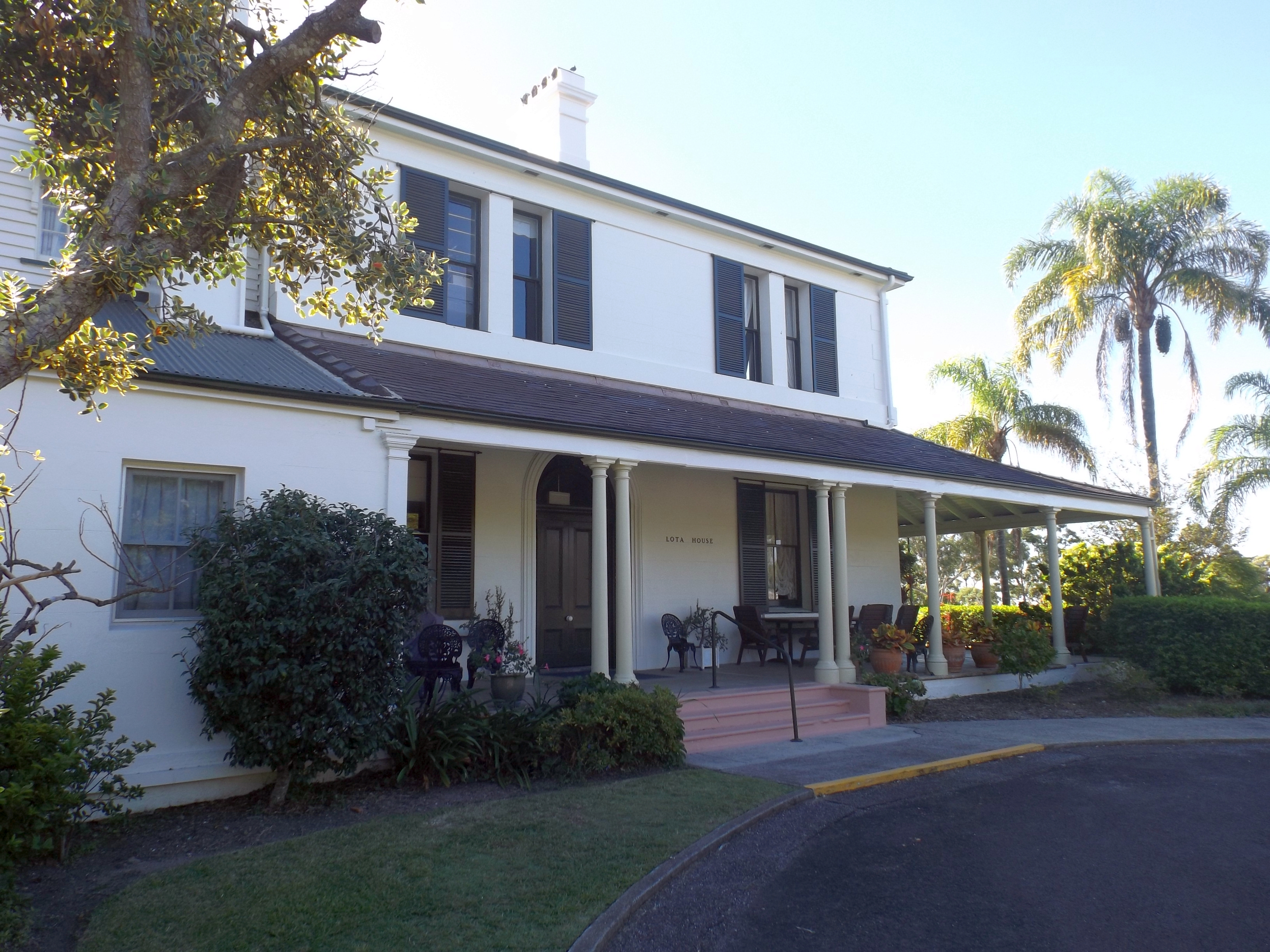
Lota House, 2015

Lota has a number of heritage-listed sites, including:

- Lota Sanitary Depot (former) & BCC Pound Residence (Melaleuca Environmental Park), 34 Herbert Street (27.4699°S 153.1792°E)
- Manly-Lota Presbyterian Church (also known as Rix-Farmer Memorial Church), 137 Oceana Terrace (27.46248°S 153.18759°E)
- Lota House (also known as Edwin Marsden Tooth Memorial Home), the residence of William Duckett White, 162 Oceana Terrace (27.4629°S 153.1892°E)

== Education ==
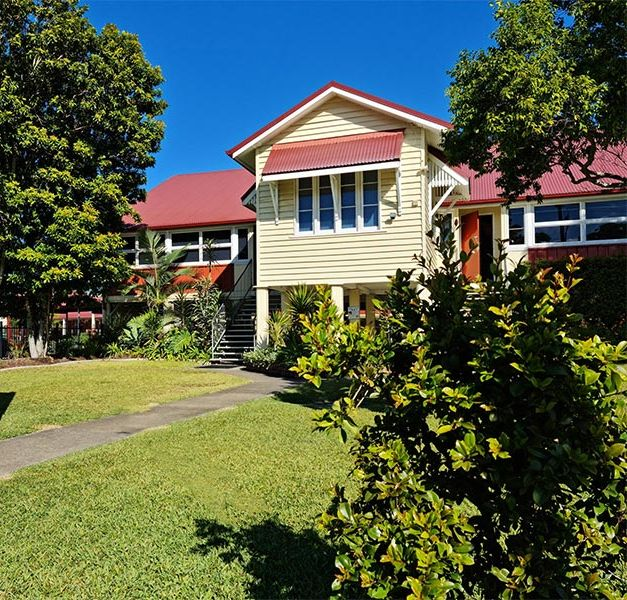
Lota State School, 2024

Lota State School is a government primary (Prep-6) school for boys and girls at 26 Richard Street (27.4692°S 153.1862°E). In 2018, the school had an enrolment of 200 students with 16 teachers (12 full-time equivalent) and 13 non-teaching staff (7 full-time equivalent). It includes a special education program.

There are no secondary schools in Lota. The nearest government secondary school is Wynnum State High School in Wynnum to the north.

== Amenities ==
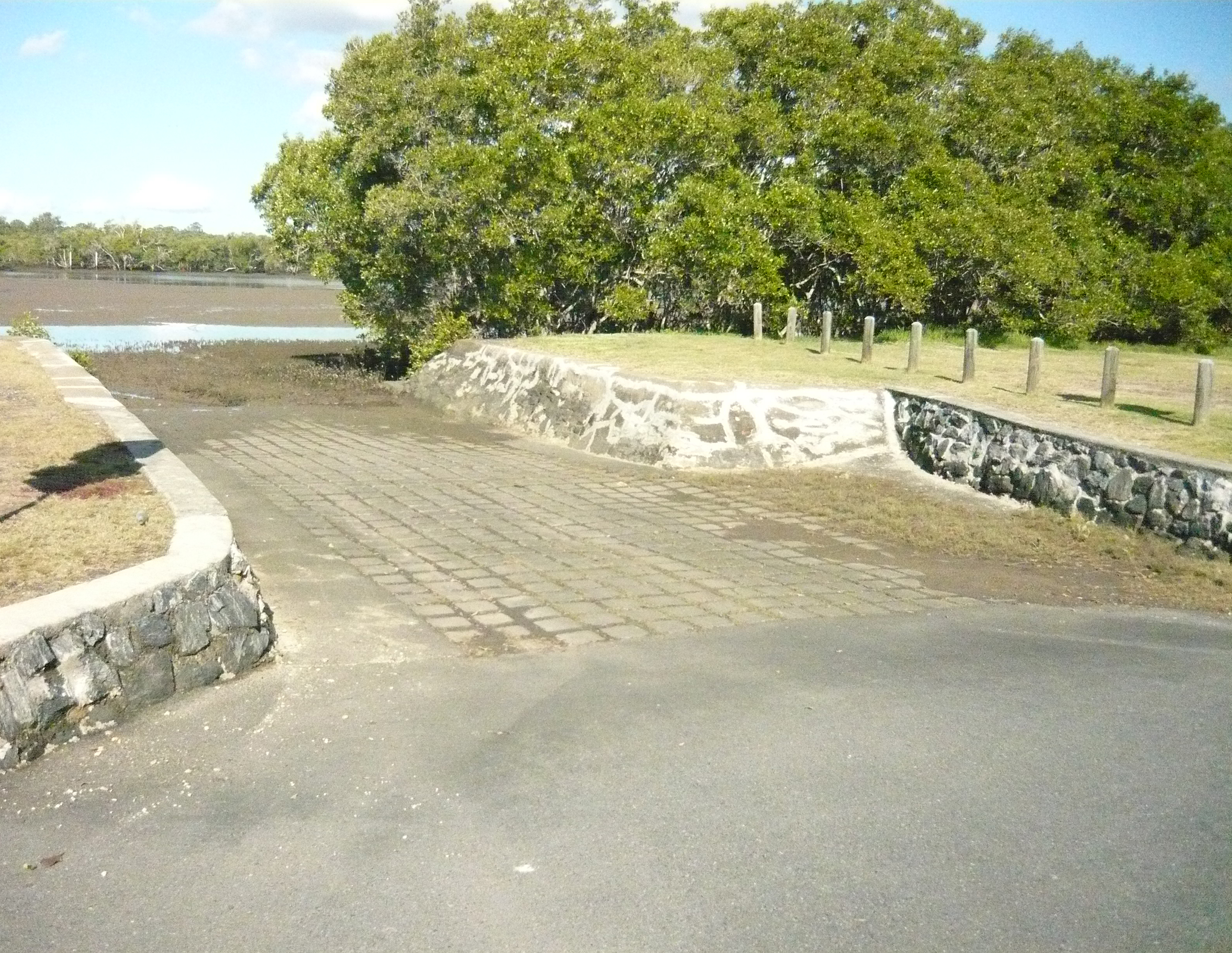
Espanade boat ramp opposite Cobar Street

Manly-Lota Presbyterian Church is at 137 Oceana Terrace. It is part of the Presbyterian Church of Queensland.

Bayside United Football Club is a soccer club using the Don Randall Oval in Bill Lamond Park on the junction of Andrews Street and Railway Terrace (27.4718°S 153.1878°E). It fields junior and senior teams.

There is a boat ramp providing access to Moreton Bay on the Esplanade opposite Cobar Street (27.47418°S 153.19288°E). It is managed by the Brisbane City Council.

There is a boardwalk that crosses Lota Creek, connecting Whites Road in Lota with Chelsea Road in Ransome (27.47448°S 153.18298°E).

Other local amenities include the Bayside PCYC and the Melaleuca Environmental Park. The Lota Foreshore Park (formerly the Lota Camping Reserve) is a large bay-front park that stretches along the eastern edge of the suburb, with playgrounds, barbecuing facilities, and a sculpture park.

=== Parks ===
There are a number of parks in the area:

- Beneteau Place Park (27.4672°S 153.1820°E)
- Bill Lamond Park (27.4724°S 153.1866°E)
- Bridgewater Place Park (27.4663°S 153.1830°E)
- Brookside Place Park (27.4653°S 153.1846°E)
- Cox Park (27.4692°S 153.1851°E)
- Ed Devenport Rotary Park (27.4693°S 153.1896°E)
- Golden Place Park (27.4663°S 153.1857°E)
- Herbert Street Park (27.4718°S 153.1786°E)
- Lota Camping Reserve (27.4673°S 153.1926°E)
- Lota Creek Reserve (27.4727°S 153.1885°E)
- Manly Road Park (27.4756°S 153.1720°E)
- RQYS Port Centre Park (27.4608°S 153.1915°E)

== Transport ==
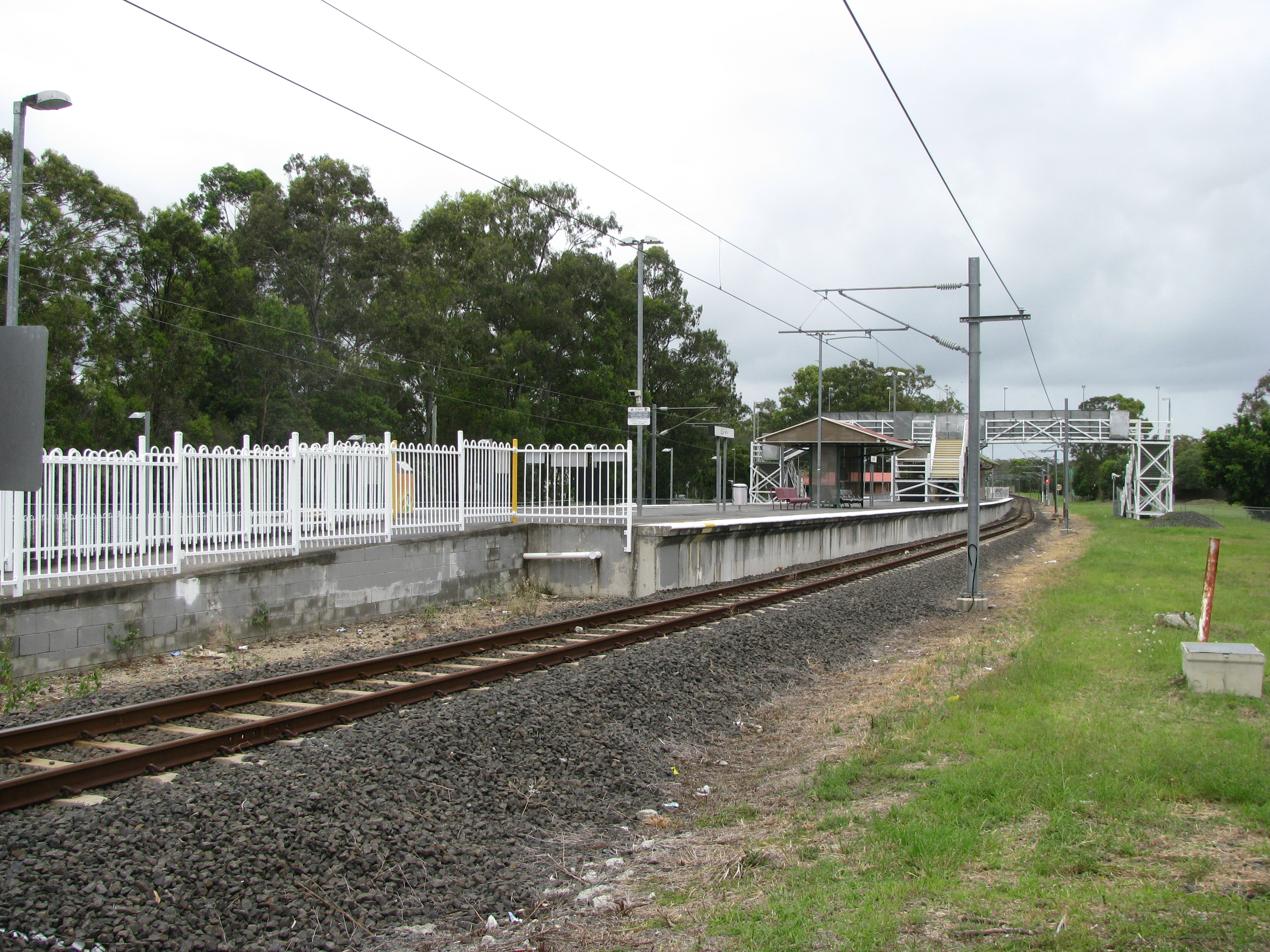
Lota railway station and foot bridge, 2010

Lota railway station provides access to regular Queensland Rail City network services to Brisbane and Cleveland.

== Governance ==
At the local level, Lota is in the Wynnum-Manly ward of the Brisbane City Council, represented by Cr Sara Whitmee. At the state level, Lota is within the Lytton electorate, a traditionally safe Labor seat, held by Joan Pease. LNP MP Ross Vasta has held the Federal electorate of Bonner since 2010.
