= Gumdale =

- Suburb
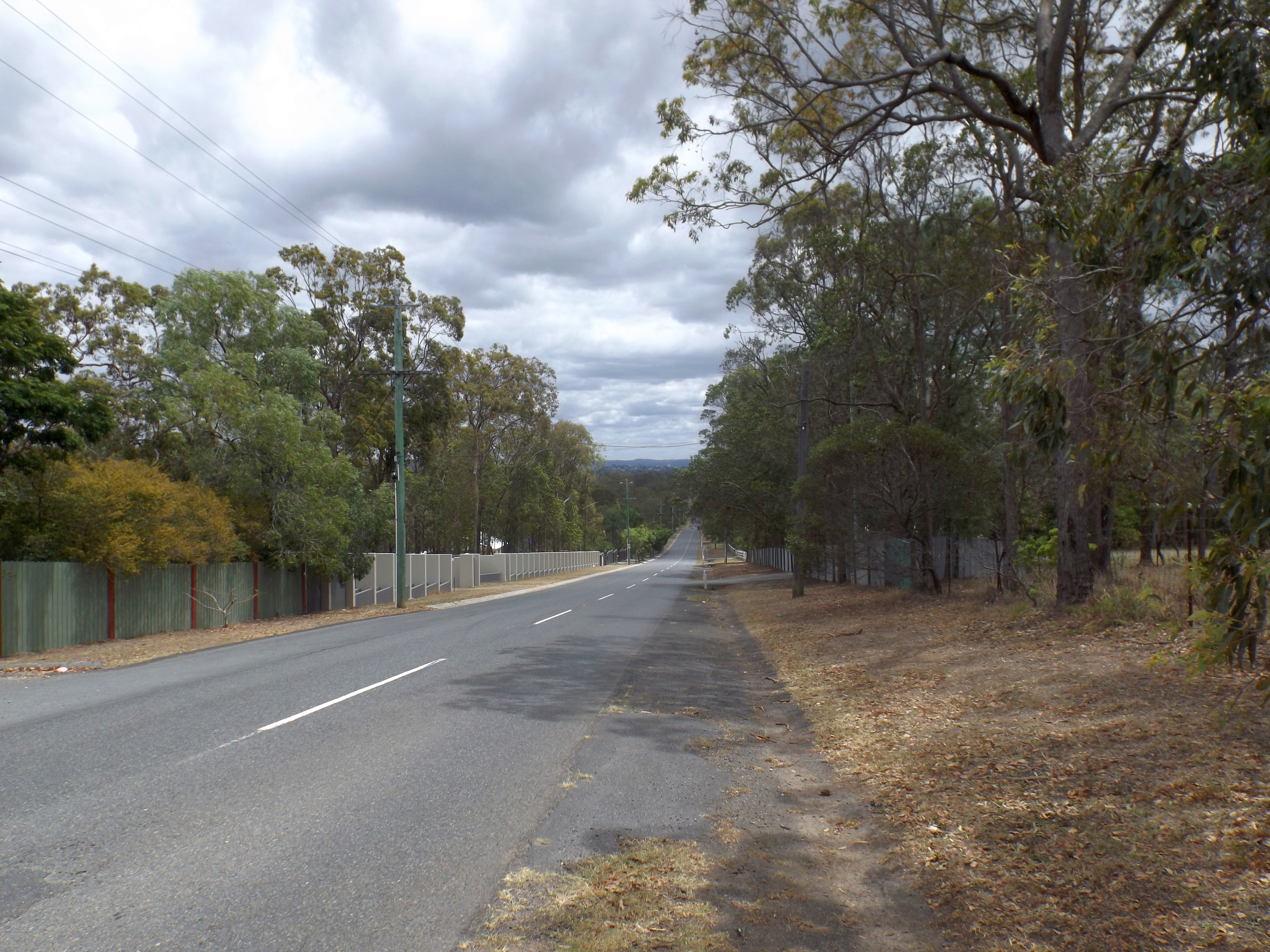
- Grassdale Road, 2014

- Interactive map of Gumdale
- Coordinates: 27.4947°S 153.1558°E
- Country: Australia
- State: Queensland
- City: Brisbane
- LGA: City of Brisbane (Chandler Ward)
- Location: 15.6 km (9.7 mi) ESE of Brisbane CBD

Government
  - State electorate: Chatsworth
  - Federal division: Bonner

Area
  - Total: 4.5 km^{2} (1.7 sq mi)

Population
  - Total: 2,298 (2021 census)
  - Density: 511/km^{2} (1,323/sq mi)
- Time zone: UTC+10:00 (AEST)
- Postcode: 4154
Suburbs around Gumdale
Tingalpa	Wakerley	Wakerley
Belmont	Gumdale	Ransome
Belmont	Chandler	Chandler

Gumdale is an outer suburb of the City of Brisbane, Queensland, Australia. In the 2021 census, Gumdale had a population of 2,298 people.

== Geography ==
Gumdale is 17.7 kilometres (11.0 mi) by road ESE of the Brisbane CBD. The average property size in Gumdale is approximately between 5,000 to 10,000 square metres (1.2 to 2.5 acres) making Gumdale consist mostly of acreages. However, access to Brisbane city is only 15 to 20 minutes away by car. Gumdale has several new development sites consisting of less than 5% of housing, the other 95% are acreages. It is Brisbane's nearest acreage suburb to the CBD.

== History ==
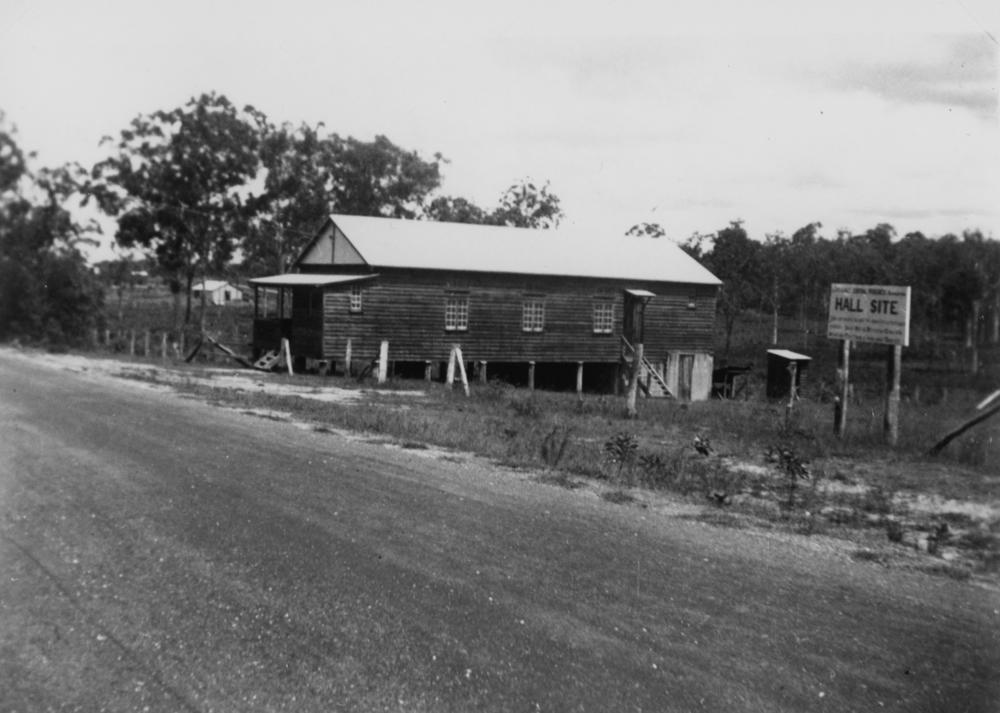
Gumdale Hall on New Cleveland Road opened in 1937

The Grassdale Land Company Limited formed on 8 January 1885 to acquire the property known as Grassdale Paddocks, in the parish of Tingalpa, with registered shareholders holding 80 shares of 250 pounds each. This area is spread across the Brisbane suburbs of Gumdale, Belmont and Chandler. The company offered the land for auction in the Grassdale Estate later in 1885. The allotments were situated along Grassdale Road, London Road, Boston Road, Old Cleveland Road, Archer Street and four unnamed roads (later called Belmont Road, Stanborough Road, Tilley Road and New Cleveland Road). Prior to the sale extensive publicity was published in the Brisbane newspapers, calling for "the attention of the investor, capitalist, farmer, merchant, artizan [sic], and mechanic, and is only one hour's drive from Brisbane, and as it has been decided to run the Cleveland Railway through the Estate, it will be brought within a few minutes' ride of the heart of the city". The results of the public auction on 28 November 1885 were reported in the Telegraph newspaper with "forty-two lots were disposed of, comprising an area of 144 acres..." The Grassdale Land Company Limited later produced a plan of divisions of unsold land into 45 lots, listing the size and value of the lots at the time.

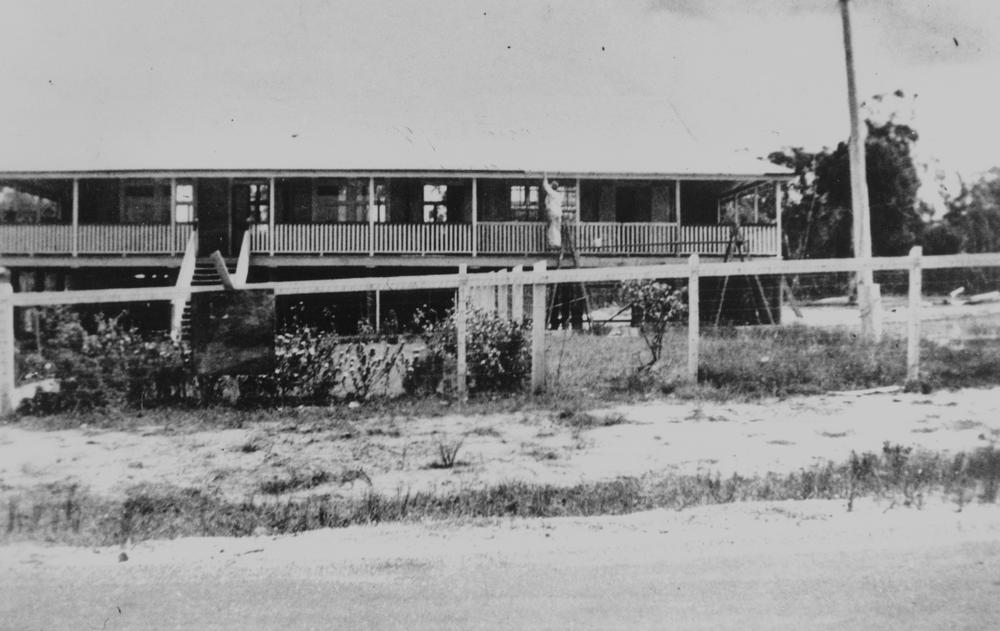
Gumdale State School, 1940

Grassdale State School opened on 26 August 1935. In July 1942, it was renamed Gumdale State School.

The Grassdale Public Hall opened on New Cleveland Road on Saturday 10 September 1937 after 21 months of fundraising.

The Grassdale name refers the grass trees (Xanthorrhoeia) that grew in the district. When a post office was to be opened in 1941, it was desired to avoid confusion with Grassdale, South Australia and so it was announced in 1942 that the name was changed to Gumdale.

St Francis' Anglican Church was dedicated in 1960. It held its last service in December 2005. It was at 281 Tilley Road (27.4905°S 153.1530°E). The land was sold in 2006. As at 2020, the Eastside Village shopping centre is at that site.

== Demographics ==
In the 2011 census, Gumdale recorded a population of 950 people, 48.5% female and 51.5% male. The median age of the Gumdale population was 39 years of age, 2 years above the Australian median. 82.7% of people living in Gumdale were born in Australia, compared to the national average of 69.8%; the next most common countries of birth were New Zealand 3.4%, England 3%, United States of America 0.9%, South Africa 0.6%, Ireland 0.6%. 92% of people spoke only English at home; the next most common languages were 1.6% Cantonese, 0.9% Italian, 0.9% Greek, 0.3% Hindi, 0.3% Czech.

In the 2016 census, Gumdale had a population of 2,118 people.

In the 2021 census, Gumdale had a population of 2,298 people.

== Education ==
Gumdale State School is a government primary (Prep-6) school for boys and girls at 677 New Cleveland Road (27.4918°S 153.1524°E). In 2017, the school had an enrolment of 893 students with 63 teachers (54 full-time equivalent) and 31 non-teaching staff (21 full-time equivalent). It includes a special education program.

There are no secondary schools in Gumdale; the nearest are Brisbane Bayside State College in Wynnum West, Wynnum State High School in Wynnum and Capalaba State College in Capalaba.
