= Ransome, Queensland =

Ransome
- Suburb
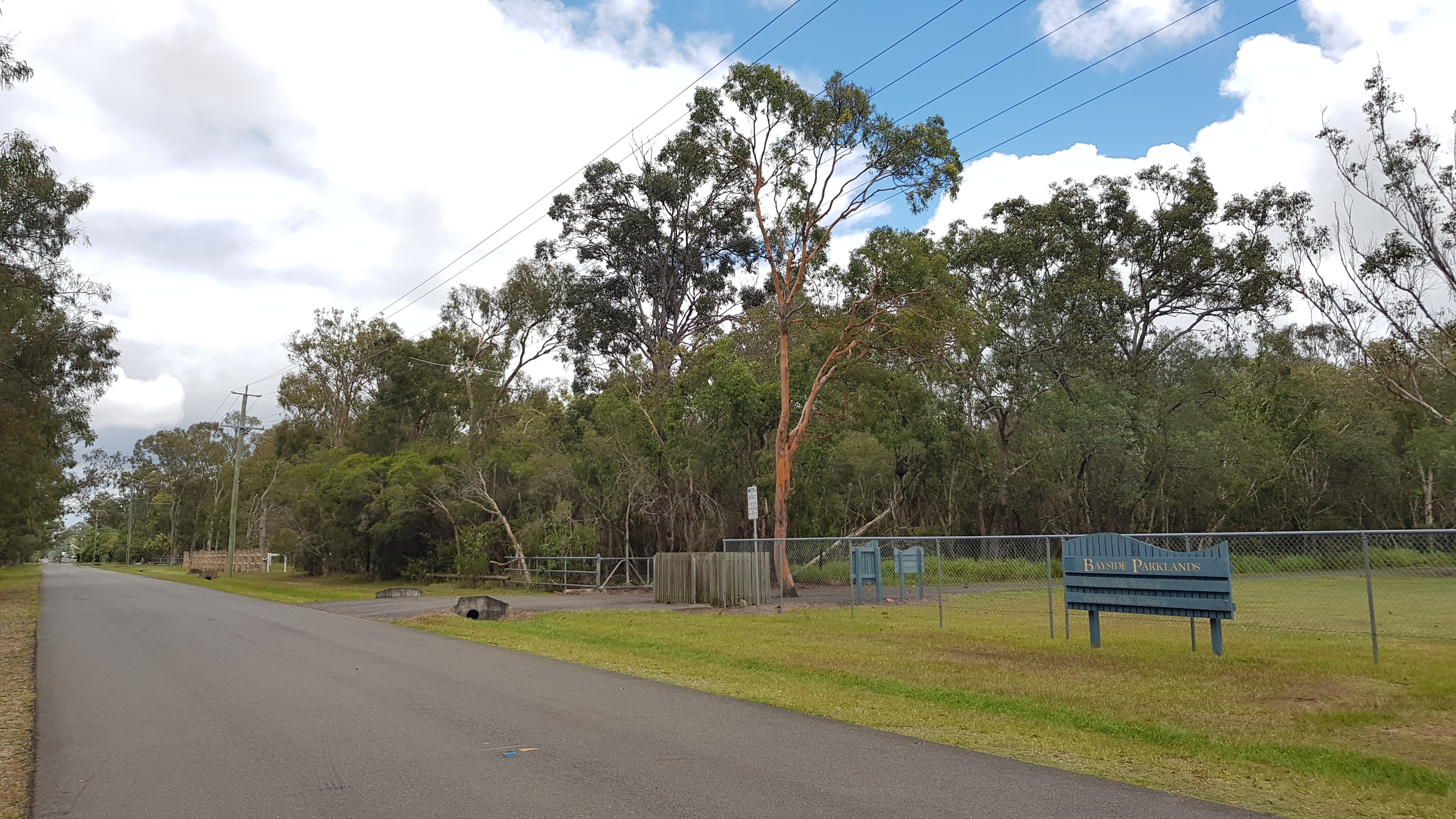
- Mookin-Bah Reserve, 2018

- Interactive map of Ransome
- Coordinates: 27.4859°S 153.1802°E
- Country: Australia
- State: Queensland
- City: Brisbane
- LGA: City of Brisbane (Chandler Ward)
- Location: 19.6 km (12.2 mi) E of Brisbane CBD
- Established: 1975

Government
  - State electorate: Chatsworth
  - Federal division: Bonner

Area
  - Total: 4.8 km^{2} (1.9 sq mi)

Population
  - Total: 429 (2021 census)
  - Density: 89.4/km^{2} (231.5/sq mi)
- Time zone: UTC+10:00 (AEST)
- Postcode: 4154
Suburbs around Ransome
Wakerley	Lota	Lota
Wakerley	Ransome	Thorneside
Gumdale	Chandler	Birkdale

Ransome is an outer coastal suburb in the City of Brisbane, Queensland, Australia. In the 2021 census, Ransome had a population of 429 people.

== Geography ==
Ransome is 19.6 kilometres (12 mi) by road east of the Brisbane CBD. It is on the boundary with the City of Redland.

Ransome is bounded to the north by Moreton Bay, to the east by Tingalpa Creek, to the south by Chadwell Street and to the west loosely by Lota Creek.

Rickertt Road enters the suburb from the west (Wakerley) and travels straight east through the suburb and exits to the east (Thornside); it is the only through road in the suburb. Molle Road enters the suburb from the south-west (Gumdale) and travels straight east through the suburb, terminating at the boundary of the locality at Tingalpa Creek. Chelsea Road enters the suburb from the south (Gumdale/Chandler) and travels straight north terminating at Lota Creek.

There are two separate residential areas in Ransome, one on Rickertt Road (27.4865°S 153.1809°E) and the other on Molle Road (27.4949°S 153.1792°E). The remainder of the land is undeveloped.

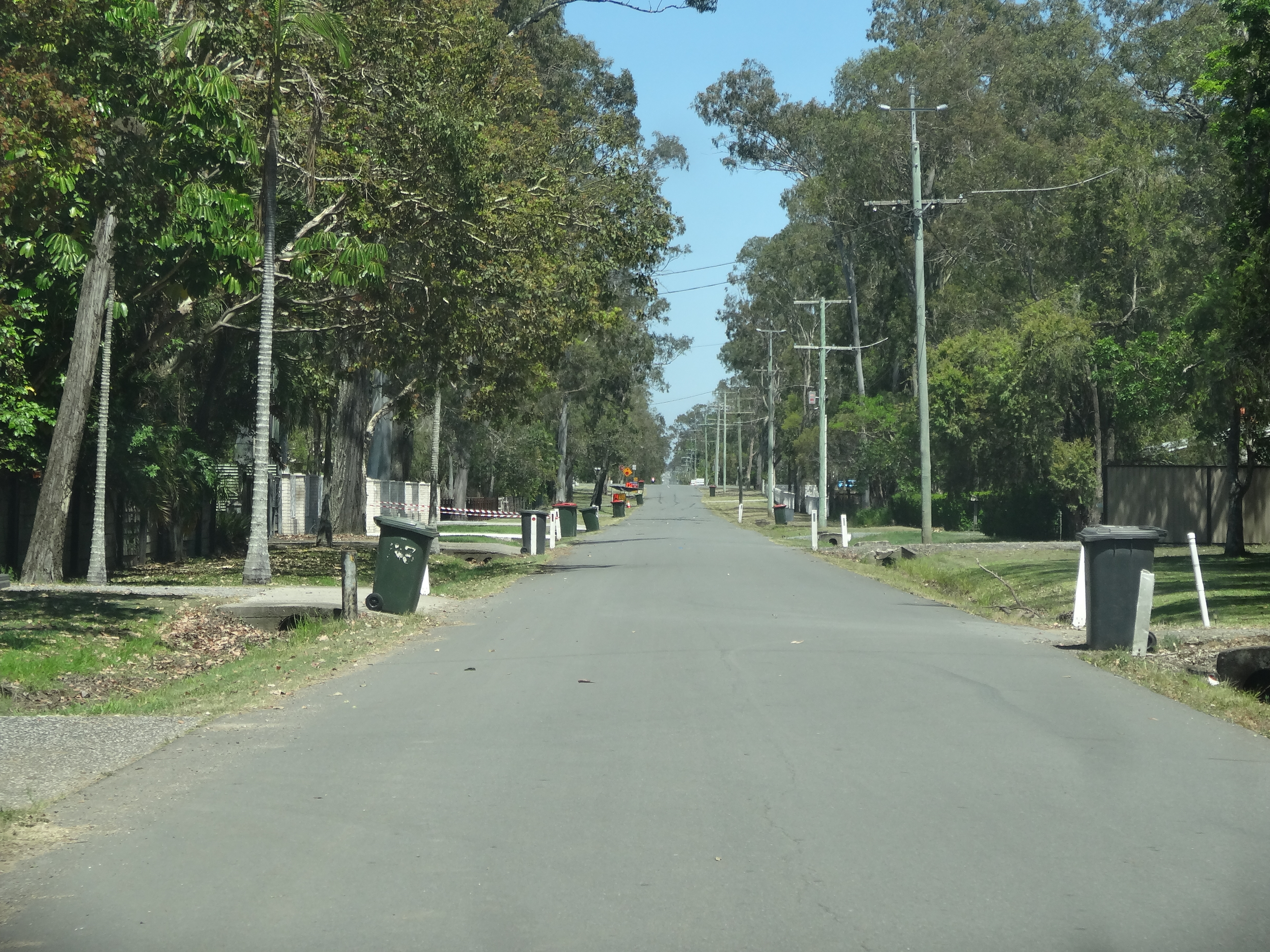
Molle Road

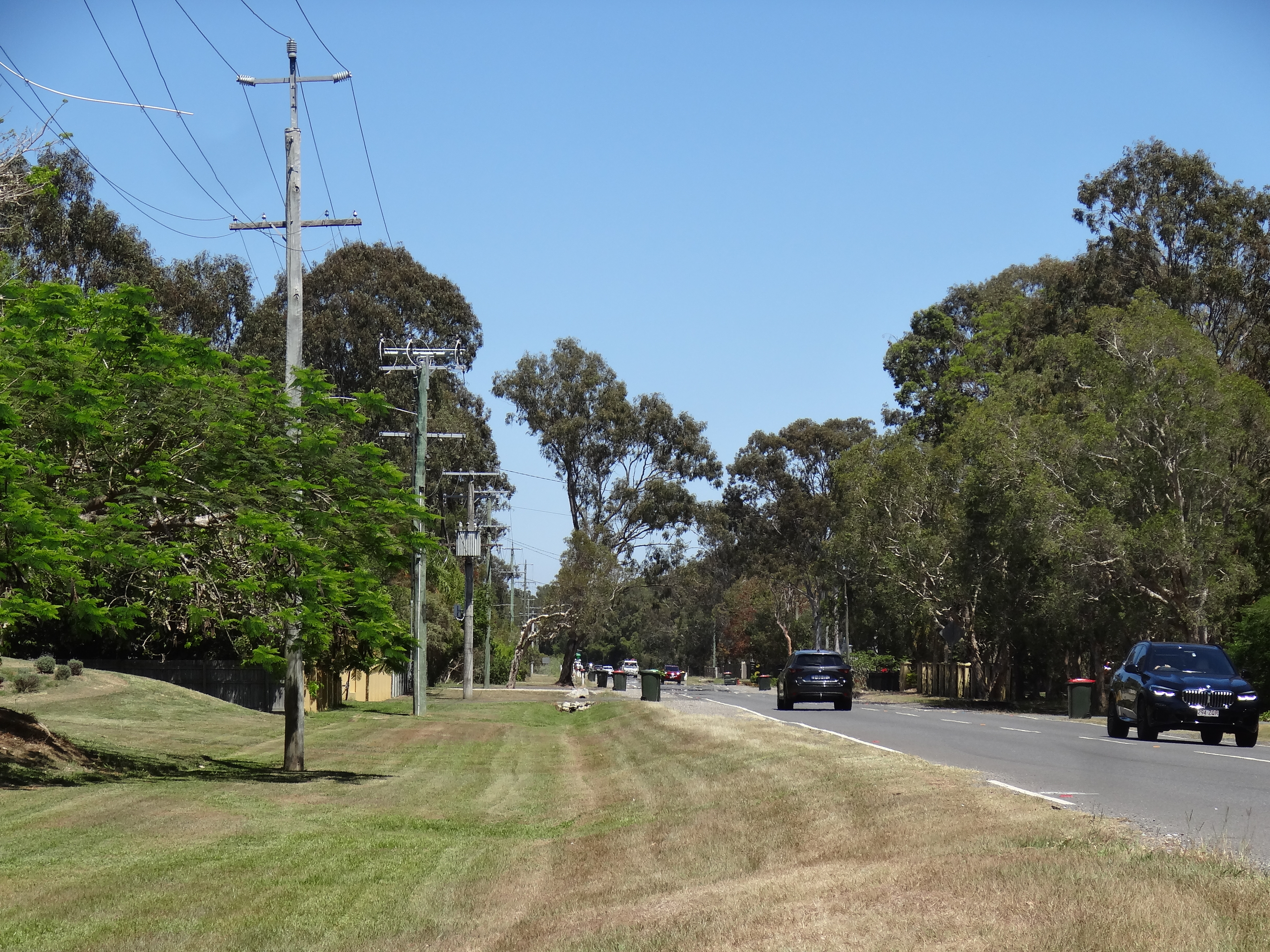
Rickertt Road

Tingalpa Creek Conservation Park is beside Molle Road and Tingalpa Creek (27.4955°S 153.1863°E).

The Cleveland railway line passes through the suburb from the north (Lota) to the north-east (Thorneside). It travels through undeveloped bushland and there is no railway station servicing the suburb.

Although the suburb does border Moreton Bay, the area near the coast is undeveloped land (Ransome Reserve) and includes two unnamed islands. Although there are walking tracks through the reserve, they do not extend past the railway line to the bay.

== History ==
Ransome was named after Charles Horace Ransome who lived in the area and had a sawmill, supplying mixed firewood to the city and the Queensland Railways Department. At the time of his death in November 1948, he was living in Keyes Street, Lota, immediately north of Lota Creek.

On 11 August 1975, the area was officially named and bounded by the Queensland Place Names Board.

== Demographics ==
In the 2011 census, Ransome had a population of 474 people, 50% female and 50% male. The median age of the Ransome population was 39 years, 2 years above the Australian median. 73.4% of people living in Ransome were born in Australia, compared to the national average of 69.8%; the next most common countries of birth were England 6.8%, New Zealand 6.1%, Germany 1.5%, Taiwan 0.8%, Austria 0.8%. 88.2% of people spoke only English at home; the next most common languages were 2.5% German, 1.5% Persian (excluding Dari), 0.8% Mandarin, 0.6% Dutch, 0.6% Danish.

In the 2016 census, Ransome had a population of 405 people.

In the 2021 census, Ransome had a population of 429 people.

== Education ==
There are no schools in Ransome. The nearest government primary school is Gumdale State School in Gumdale to the south-west. The nearest government secondary schools are Wellington Point State High School in Wellington Point to the east, Capalaba State College in Capalaba to the south, and Wynnum State High School in Wynnum to the north.

== Amenities ==
There are a number of parks in the suburb:

- Chadwell Street Park (27.5010°S 153.1843°E)
- Chelsea Road Park (no.258) (27.4889°S 153.1745°E)
- Chelsea Road Park (no.303) (27.4913°S 153.1830°E)
- Chelsea Road Park (no.498) (27.4771°S 153.1818°E)
- Chelsea Road Park (nos.399-551) (27.4827°S 153.1850°E)
- Green Camp Road Park (27.4800°S 153.1725°E)
- Molle Road Park (27.4973°S 153.1847°E)
- Ransome Road Park (27.4777°S 153.1877°E)
- Rickertt Road (no 277) Park (27.4887°S 153.1848°E)
- Rickertt Road Park (27.4844°S 153.1702°E)
