= Wakerley, Queensland =

Wakerley
- Suburb
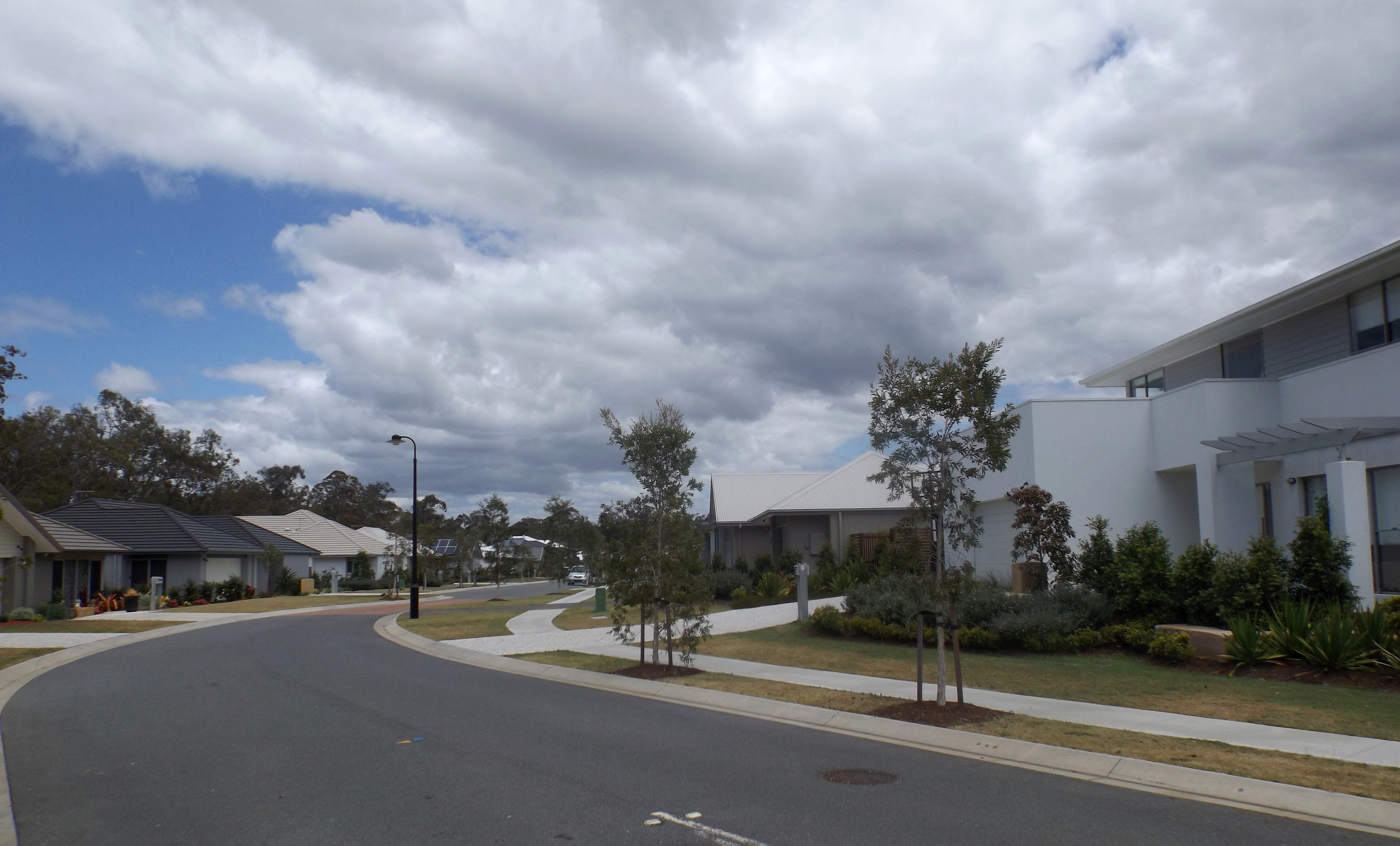
- Watervale Parade, 2014

- Interactive map of Wakerley
- Coordinates: 27.4816°S 153.1591°E
- Country: Australia
- State: Queensland
- City: Brisbane
- LGA: City of Brisbane (Chandler Ward; Doboy Ward)
- Location: 17.7 km (11.0 mi) E of Brisbane CBD

Government
  - State electorate: Chatsworth
  - Federal division: Bonner

Area
  - Total: 4.9 km^{2} (1.9 sq mi)

Population
  - Total: 8,718 (2021 census)
  - Density: 1,779/km^{2} (4,610/sq mi)
- Time zone: UTC+10:00 (AEST)
- Postcode: 4154
Suburbs around Wakerley
Tingalpa	Manly West	Manly West
Tingalpa	Wakerley	Ransome
Belmont	Gumdale	Ransome

Wakerley is an eastern suburb in the City of Brisbane, Queensland, Australia. In the 2021 census, Wakerley had a population of 8,718 people.

== Geography ==
Wakerley is south of the Brisbane River, 15 kilometres (9.3 mi) east of the Brisbane CBD, and close to the Southern bayside suburbs.

== History ==
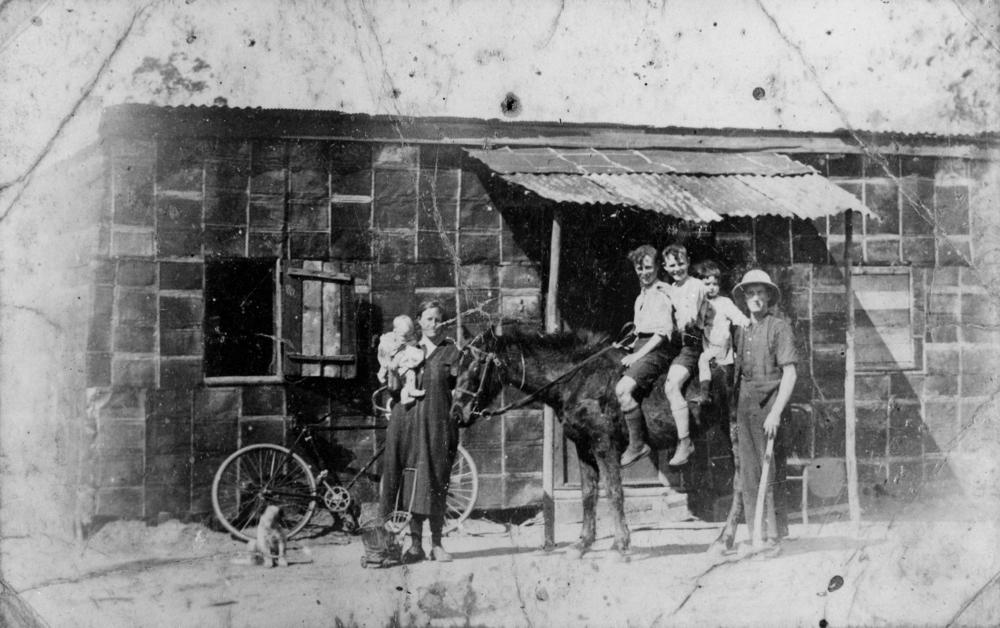
Family in front of house made of kerosene tins at Wakerley, 1927

Wakerley was named after early settler John William Wakerley.

Agnew School opened on 3 February 2003.

Agnew School opened in Agnew Street, Norman Park, on 3 February 2003. The school relocated to Wakerley in 2008 and, as of 2020, it is known as the Brisbane campus of One School Global.

== Demographics ==
In the 2011 census, the population of Wakerley was 7,804, 50.9% female and 49.1% male. The median age of the Wakerley population was 33 years, 4 years below the Australian median. 68.7% of people living in Wakerley were born in Australia, compared to the national average of 69.8%; the next most common countries of birth were England 6.5%, New Zealand 6.3%, South Africa 4%, Scotland 1%, India 0.6%. 85.8% of people spoke only English at home; the next most common languages were 1.8% Afrikaans, 0.9% Greek, 0.7% Spanish, 0.6% Hindi, 0.6% Italian.

In the 2016 census, Wakerley had a population of 8,445 people.

In the 2021 census, Wakerley had a population of 8,718 people.

== Education ==
The Brisbane campus of OneSchool Global (formerly known as the Agnew School) is a private primary and secondary (Years 3–12) school for boys and girls at 190 Ingleston Road (27.4852°S 153.1417°E). It is operated by the Plymouth Brethren Christian Church. In 2018, the school had an enrolment of 318 students with 36 teachers (32 full-time equivalent) and 26 non-teaching staff (20 full-time equivalent). As at 26 October 2024, the school had an enrolment of 143 students.

There are no government schools in Wakerley. The nearest government primary schools are Gumdale State School in neighbouring Gumdale to the south and Manly West State School in neighbouring Manly West to the north-east. The nearest government secondary schools are Brisbane Bayside State College in Wynnum West to the north-west and Wynnum State High School in Wynnum to the north-east.
