= Manly West, Queensland =

Manly West
- Suburb
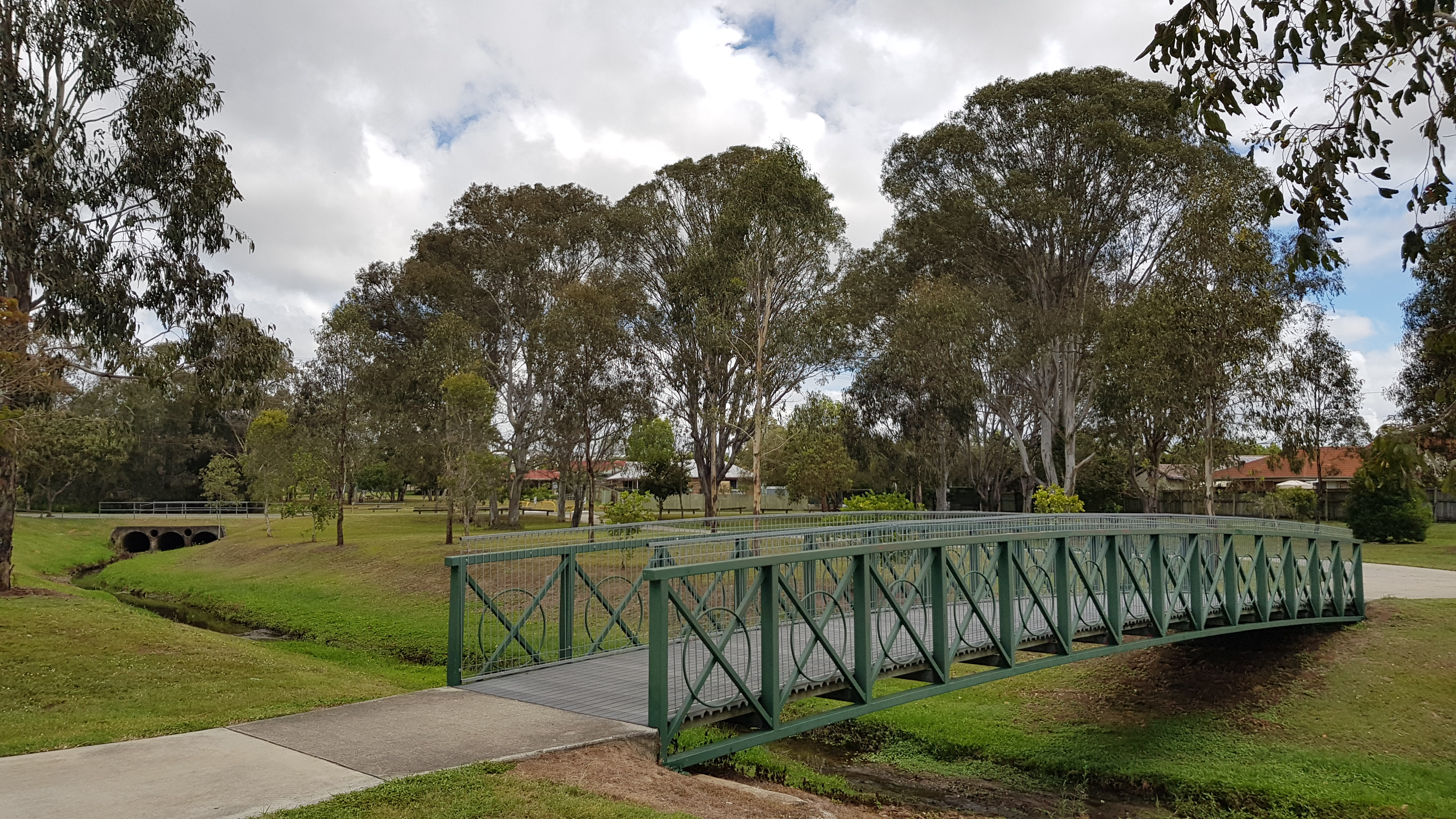
- Robtrish Street Park, 2018

- Interactive map of Manly West
- Coordinates: 27.4636°S 153.1691°E
- Country: Australia
- State: Queensland
- City: Brisbane
- LGA: City of Brisbane (Doboy Ward)
- Location: 17.6 km (10.9 mi) E of Brisbane CBD

Government
  - State electorates: Lytton; Chatsworth
  - Federal division: Bonner

Area
  - Total: 5.1 km^{2} (2.0 sq mi)

Population
  - Total: 12,436 (2021 census)
  - Density: 2,438/km^{2} (6,320/sq mi)
- Time zone: UTC+10:00 (AEST)
- Postcode: 4179
Suburbs around Manly West
Wynnum West	Wynnum	Manly
Tingalpa	Manly West	Lota
Tingalpa	Wakerley	Wakerley

Manly West is a suburb in the City of Brisbane, Queensland, Australia. In the 2021 census, Manly West had a population of 12,436 people.

== Geography ==
Manly West is one suburb inland from Moreton Bay and the most common style of housing in the area is modern, low-set brick houses. It is 17.6 kilometres (10.9 mi) by road east of the Brisbane CBD.

There are two neighbourhoods in the suburb:

- Green Camp, in the south-east of the suburb (27.4749°S 153.1703°E)
- The Springs, in the south of the suburb (27.4730°S 153.1600°E)

Roles Hill rises to 48 metres (157 ft) in the north-east of the suburb (27.4587°S 153.1757°E).

== History ==
Manly West originally was a part of the suburb of Manly (which takes its name from Manly, New South Wales). It was officially gazetted as a separate suburb in 1975.

Moreton Bay Girls' High School opened on 31 January 1901 on Bay Terrace Wynnum with 20 day students and 6 boarding students. It was established by Alice J Alison Greene and her sister Anne. In 1944 the Greene family gave the school to the Methodist Church which transferred it to the Presbyterian and Methodist Schools' Association. In 1957, the school was renamed Moreton Bay College. In 1975 the PMSA decided to close the school due to a slump in student numbers to 125. Negative reaction from parents and the community resulted in the Uniting Church taking back control of the school and establishing an independent board to pursue a new strategic plan. The boarding school closed in 1980. In 1981 a new site of 20 hectares (49 acres) was purchased in Wondall Road in Manly West. The primary school commenced operations on the new site at the start of 1984 with the secondary school relocating at the start of 1986. The school celebrated its centenary in 2001 with an enrolment of 1,170 students. In April 2003 the Upper Brookfield Uniting church building was relocated to the school for use as its Centenary Chapel.

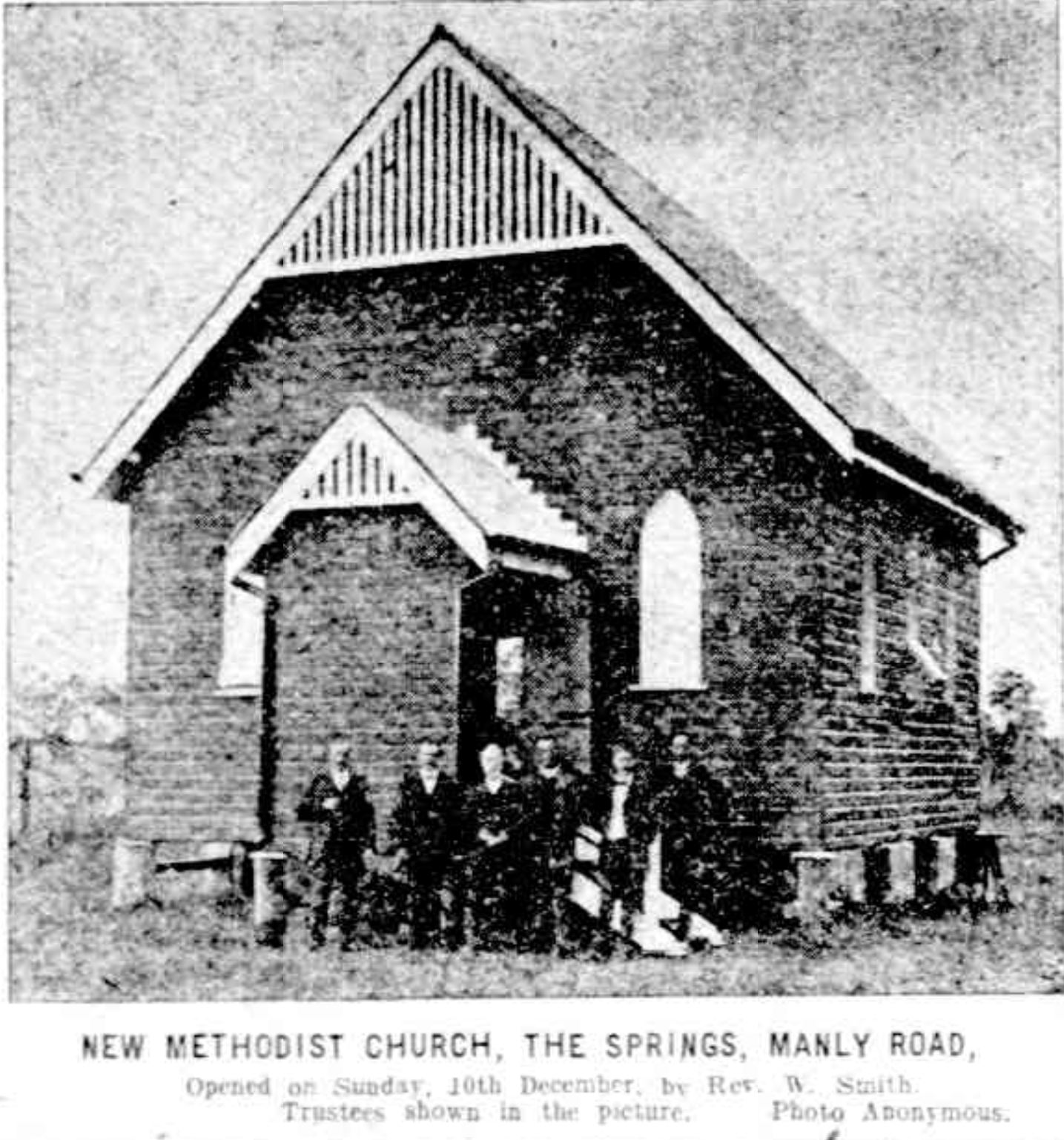
The Springs Methodist Church, 1916

The Springs Methodist Church was officially opened on Sunday 10 December 1916 by Reverend W. Smith. It was sold in 1985. It was at 481 Manly Road (27.4753°S 153.1636°E). The church building is no longer extant.

In 1951, land in Preston Road was purchased to build a Methodist church. A stump-capping ceremony was held on 1 November 1952. Sunday School commenced in the unfinished church on 12 April 1953 with the 22 children and 3 teachers being lifted into the building as the steps had not yet been built. Preston Road Methodist Church (also known as Manly West Methodist Church) opened on 22 August 1953 by the President of the Queensland Methodist Conference, Reverend Arthur Charles Tempest. In 1977, it became the Preston Road Uniting Church, when the Methodist Church amalgamated into the Uniting Church in Australia.The church was at 186 Preston Road (27.4550°S 153.1688°E). It is now in private ownership but, at 2021, the church building is still extant and being used as a childcare centre.

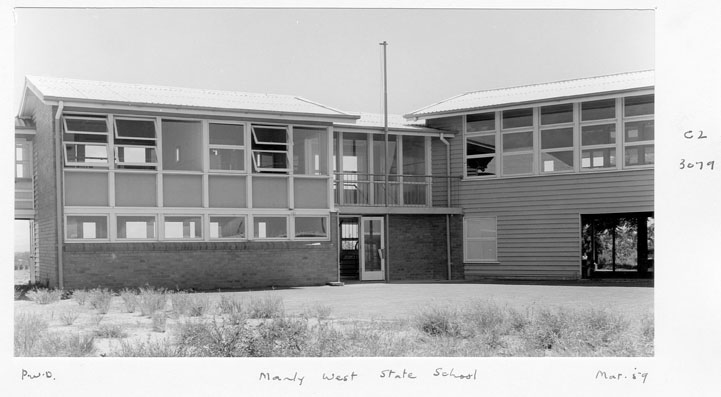
Manly West State School, March 1959

Manly West State School opened on 28 January 1958. The swimming pool was added in 1977.

Wynnum Christian Community Church opened in Preston Road in 1962.

Wondall Road State School opened on 12 September 1966. In 1967 it was renamed Wondall Heights State School.

A chapel for the Manly Ward of the Church of Jesus Christ of Latter-day Saints opened in Strawberry Road in 1972.

Eastside Community Church opened in Wondall Road in 1977.

Bayside Uniting Church was established in 1990, combining four Uniting Churches located at:

- Ashton Street, Wynnum, a former Methodist Church
- Kingsley Terrace, Manly, a former Methodist Church
- Preston Road, Manly West, a former Methodist Church
- Yamboyna Street, Manly, a former Congregational Church

Due to earlier or later closures, the Bayside Uniting Church also incorporated congregations from:

- Manly West ("The Springs") Methodist Church in Manly Road
- Lota Methodist Church in Ambool Street, Lota
- Lindum Methodist Church at 174 Sibley Road, Wynnum West
- Hemmant Methodist Church in Hemmant-Tingalpa Road, Hemmant

Initially the Bayside Uniting congregation held services at Oriel Handley Hall at Moreton Bay College, until their new Wondall Road church was opened on 16 November 1991.

Moreton Bay Boys College opened on 24 February 2003.

== Demographics ==
In the 2011 census, Manly West has a population of 11,195 people, 52% female and 48% male. The median age of the Manly West population was 38 years of age, 1 year above the Australian median. 78.1% of people living in Manly West were born in Australia, compared to the national average of 69.8%; the next most common countries of birth were England 4.9%, New Zealand 4.8%, South Africa 0.9%, Scotland 0.7%, Philippines 0.5%. 91.4% of people spoke only English at home; the next most common languages were 0.4% German, 0.3% Tagalog, 0.3% Japanese, 0.3% Arabic, 0.3% Spanish. Over 47% of households in this area consist of a couple with children and a further 35% are couples without children. Stand alone house account for 87% of all dwellings in this area, with townhouses accounting for a further 10%.

In the 2016 census, Manly West had a population of 11,978 people.

In the 2021 census, Manly West had a population of 12,436 people.

== Heritage listings ==
There are a number of heritage-listed sites in Manly West:

- Burwells, a Federation Queen Anne house, 10 Preston Road (27.4593°S 153.1760°E)
- Roles Hill Reservoirs, 30 Preston Road (27.4584°S 153.1752°E)
- Bunya trees, Road reserve, Manly Road (27.4747°S 153.1585°E)

== Education ==
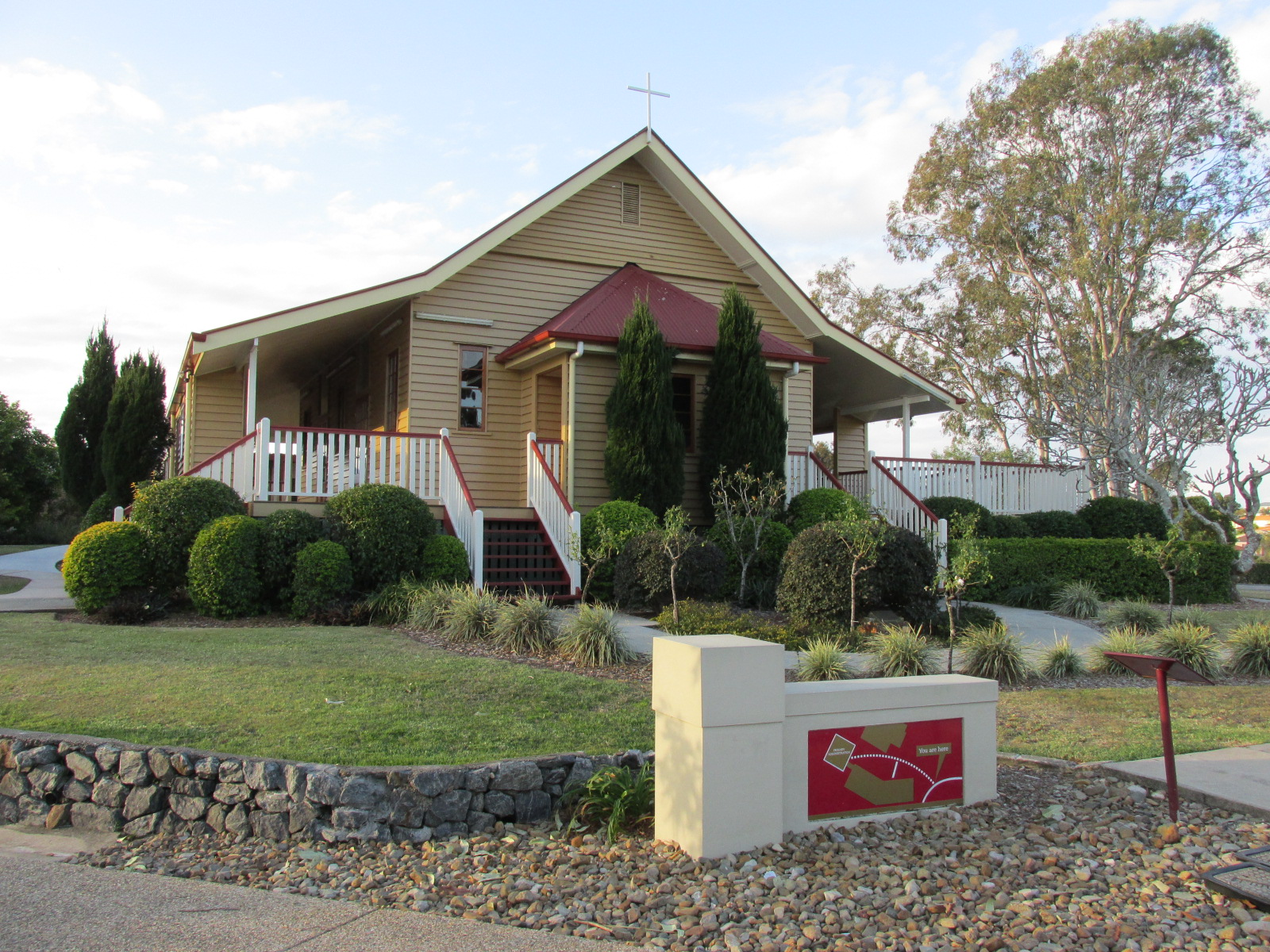
Centenary Chapel at Moreton Bay College, 2014

Manly West State School is a government primary (Prep–6) school for boys and girls at 226 Manly Road (27.4690°S 153.1742°E). In 2018, the school had an enrolment of 474 students with 33 teachers (30 full-time equivalent) and 21 non-teaching staff (14 full-time equivalent). It includes a special education program.

Wondall Heights State School is a government primary (Prep–6) school for boys and girls at Wondall Road (27.4641°S 153.1587°E). In 2018, the school had an enrolment of 678 students with 50 teachers (45 full-time equivalent) and 38 non-teaching staff (23 full-time equivalent). It includes a special education program.

Moreton Bay College is a private primary and secondary (Prep–12) school for girls at 450 Wondall Road (27.4698°S 153.1502°E). In 2018, the school had an enrolment of 1,116 students with 107 teachers (99 full-time equivalent) and 105 non-teaching staff (81 full-time equivalent).

Moreton Bay Boys College is a private primary and secondary (Prep–12) school for boys at 258-302 Manly Road (27.4707°S 153.1724°E). In 2018, the school had an enrolment of 476 students with 49 teachers (47 full-time equivalent) and 11 non-teaching staff (10 full-time equivalent).

There are no government secondary schools in Manly West. The nearest government secondary schools are Wynnum State High School in neighbouring Wynnum to the north and Brisbane Bayside State College in neighbouring Wynnum West to the north-west.

== Amenities ==
Manly West is serviced by a fortnightly visit of the Brisbane City Council's mobile library service at the Mayfair Village Shopping Centre on Manly Road (27.4748°S 153.1561°E).

There are a number of churches in Manly West, including:

- Bayside Uniting Church, 420 Wondall Road (27.4693°S 153.1514°E)
- Eastside Community Church, a Baptish church, 568 Wondall Road (27.4743°S 153.1466°E)
- Manly Ward of the Church of Jesus Christ of Latter-day Saints, 17 Daisy Road & 12 Strawberry Road (27.4571°S 153.1746°E)
- Wynnum Christian Community Church, affiliated with the Christian Community Churches of Australia, 165 Preston Road (27.4548°S 153.1700°E)
- Wynnum Manly Alliance Church, affiliated with the Christian and Missionary Alliance of Australia, 56-60 Preston Road (27.4567°S 153.1746°E)
