= Chandler, Queensland =

Chandler
- Suburb
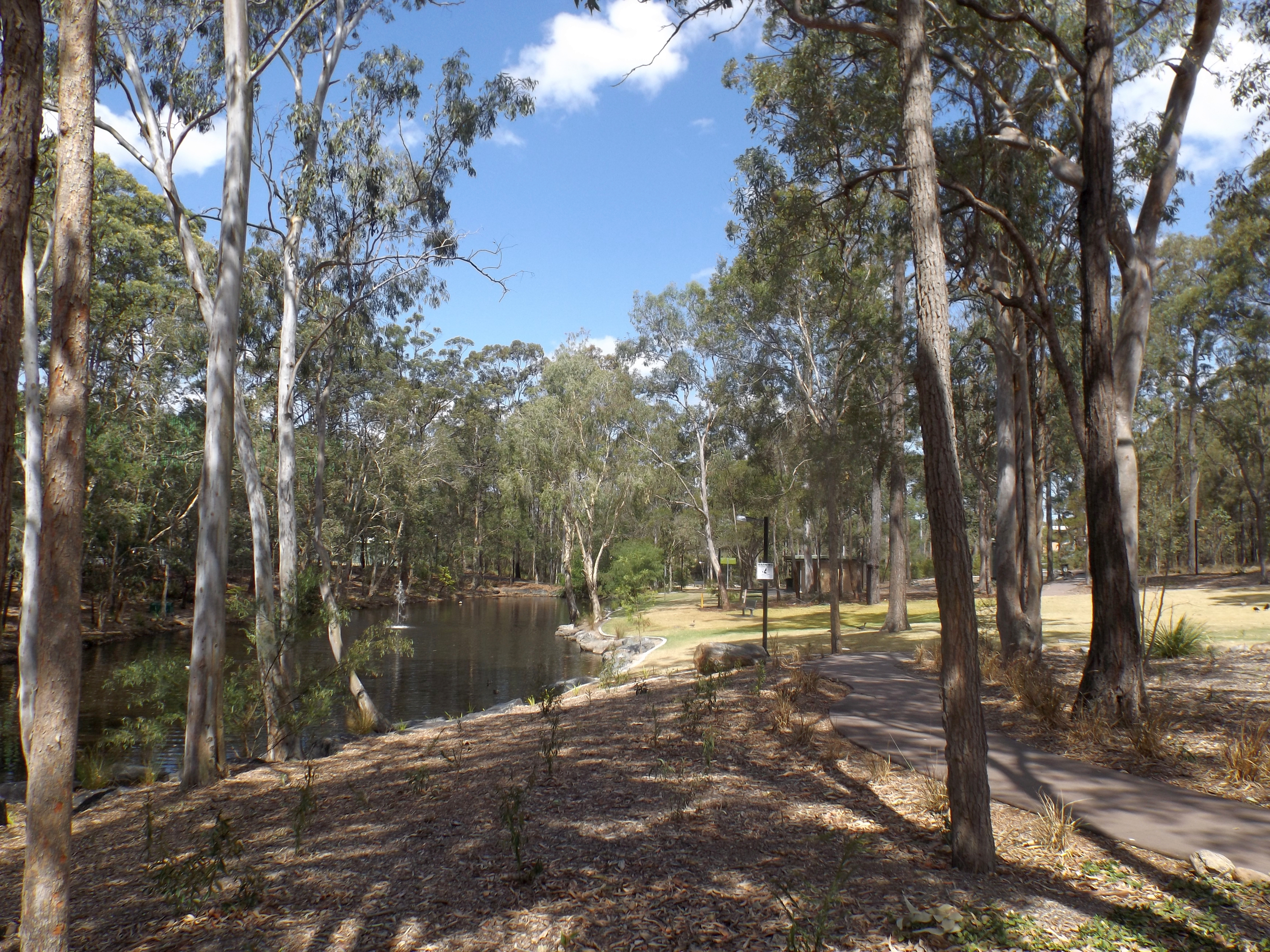
- Sleeman Centre parklands, 2014

- Interactive map of Chandler
- Coordinates: 27.5166°S 153.1855°E
- Country: Australia
- State: Queensland
- City: Brisbane
- LGA: City of Brisbane (Chandler Ward)
- Location: 16.4 km (10.2 mi) SE of Brisbane CBD

Government
  - State electorate: Chatsworth
  - Federal division: Bonner

Area
  - Total: 13.0 km^{2} (5.0 sq mi)

Population
  - Total: 1,475 (2021 census)
  - Density: 113.5/km^{2} (293.9/sq mi)
- Time zone: UTC+10:00 (AEST)
- Postcode: 4155
Suburbs around Chandler
Gumdale	Gumdale	Ransome
Belmont	Chandler	Birkdale
Belmont	Burbank	Capalaba

Chandler is an outer south-eastern suburb in the City of Brisbane, Queensland, Australia. In the 2021 census, Chandler had a population of 1,475 people.

== Geography ==
Chandler is 16.4 kilometres (10 mi) south-east by road from the Brisbane central business district.

The suburb is bounded to the east by Tingalpa Creek (27.5131°S 153.2014°E) and its southern boundary extends into the Tingalpa Reservoir (27.5296°S 153.1768°E). The easternmost point of Chandler is the easternmost point of the City of Brisbane mainland (but the easternmost point of the City as a whole is on Moreton Island considerably further east).

Chandler is a semi-rural suburb consisting largely of bushland and residential properties on acreage, close to the major commercial precincts of Carindale and Capalaba.

Chandler is perhaps best known for the Sleeman Sports Complex, a large sporting and entertainment complex.

== History ==
Chandler was named after the former Lord Mayor of Brisbane, Sir John Beals Chandler.

The town of Tingalpa (27.5174°S 153.1816°E) was surveyed in 1863 with the name of the town changed to Capalaba in 1927. The town was close to a ford of Tingalpa Creek known as The Rocks Crossing (27.5185°S 153.1882°E) which had been identified by surveyor James Warner in 1850. The ford formed part of the route from Brisbane to Cleveland until 1874 when a bridge was built over the creek along Old Cleveland Road (27.5195°S 153.1867°E).

The Grassdale Land Company Limited formed on 8 January 1885 to acquire the property known as Grassdale Paddocks, in the parish of Tingalpa, with registered shareholders holding 80 shares of 250 pounds each. This area is spread across the Brisbane suburbs of Chandler, Gumdale and Belmont. The company offered the land for auction in the Grassdale Estate later in 1885. The allotments were situated along Grassdale Road, London Road, Boston Road, Old Cleveland Road, Archer Street and four unnamed roads (later called Belmont Road, Stanborough Road, Tilley Road and New Cleveland Road). Prior to the sale extensive publicity was published in the Brisbane newspapers, calling for "the attention of the investor, capitalist, farmer, merchant, artizan [sic], and mechanic, and is only one hour’s drive from Brisbane, and as it has been decided to run the Cleveland Railway through the Estate, it will be brought within a few minutes' ride of the heart of the city". The results of the public auction on 28 November 1885 were reported in the Telegraph newspaper with "forty-two lots were disposed of, comprising an area of 144 acres..." The Grassdale Land Company Limited later produced a plan of divisions of unsold land into 45 lots, listing the size and value of the lots at the time.

In 1936, a new bridge across Tingalpa Creek was opened to replace the 1874 bridge.

It remained sparsely populated for decades, retaining much of its natural bushland. This lack of population motivated the construction of multiple buildings of the Sleeman Sporting Complex for the 1982 Commonwealth Games.

In 2009, the Department of Environment & Resource Management sought public comment on the proposal to discontinue Capalaba West as a suburb and to include the area into Chandler. On 30 April 2010, Capalaba West was absorbed into Chandler. This extended Chandler's eastern border to Tingalpa Creek, separating Brisbane from Redland City, and added a small commercial area along Old Cleveland Road to the suburb.

== Demographics ==
In the 2011 census, Chandler had a population of 1,422 people, of whom 50.4% were female and 49.6% were male. The median age of the Chandler population was 42 years of age, 5 years above the Australian median. 78.9% of people living in Chandler were born in Australia. The other top responses for country of birth were England (3.4%), New Zealand (2.3%), Italy (1%), Fiji (0.9%), and India (0.8%). 85.2% of people spoke only English at home; the next most popular languages were Italian (2%), Greek (1.5%), Vietnamese (0.9%), Hindi (0.5%), and Dutch (0.4%).

In the 2016 census, Chandler had a population of 1,442 people.

In the 2021 census, Chandler had a population of 1,475 people.

== Education ==
There are no schools in Chandler. The nearest government primary schools are Capalaba State College in neighbouring Capalaba to the south-east, Gumdale State School in neighbouring Gumdale to the north, and Belmont State School in Carindale to the west. The nearest government secondary schools are Capalabla State College in Capalaba and Brisbane Bayside State College in Wynnum West to the north.

== Facilities ==
Chandler Transfer Station is a waste transfer station at 728 Tilley Road (27.5142°S 153.1514°E). It is operated by the Brisbane City Council.

== Amenities ==
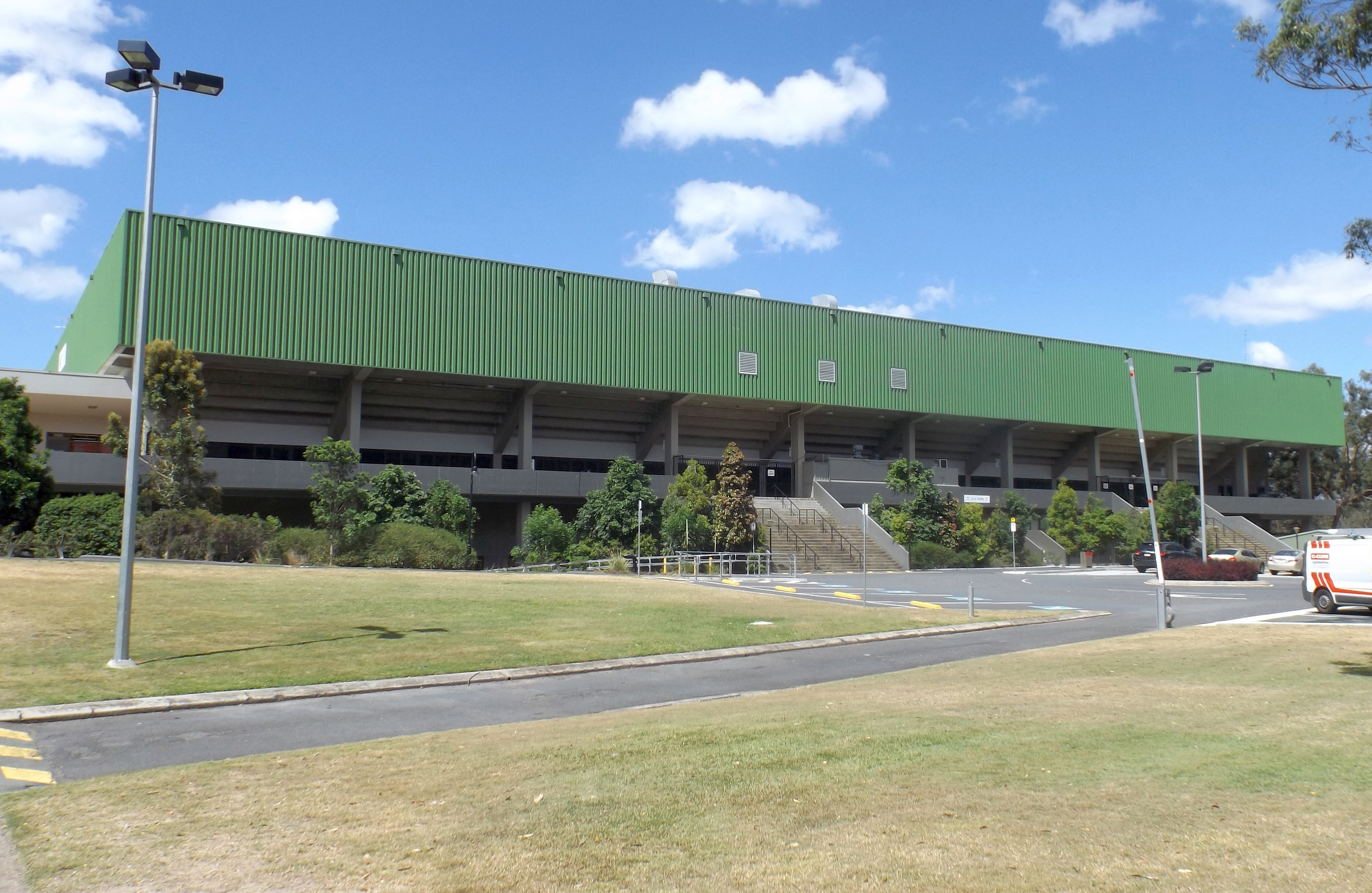
The Brisbane Aquatic Centre, a major venue of the Sleeman Sports Complex, which hosts an Olympic-size swimming pool and a diving platform.

The Sleeman Sports Complex is located at the corner of Old Cleveland & Tilley Roads (27.5109°S 153.1471°E), and has brought Chandler to prominence during events such as the 1982 Commonwealth Games, the 2001 Goodwill Games, and the 2018 Commonwealth Games. Alongside an auditorium, accommodation, and gardens, it provides facilities for a wide range of sports, including:

- Anna Meares Velodrome (27.5148°S 153.1466°E), an indoor velodrome
- BMX Supercross Track
- Brisbane Aquatic Centre (27.5130°S 153.1476°E)
- Chandler Arena (27.5123°S 153.1457°E), used for indoor soccer, basketball, badminton, volleyball, martial arts, and ballroom dancing
- Chandler Theatre (27.5128°S 153.1463°E)
- Chandler Velodrome (27.5111°S 153.1469°E), an outdoor velodrome
- Dry Diving Training Hall (27.5111°S 153.1471°E)
- Gymnastics Training Hall (27.5127°S 153.1452°E)
- State Weightlifting Centre
- A fitness centre for cardio, weight training, aerobics and spinning

Situated on Old Cleveland Road, the Complex also features a large Translink public "Park 'n' ride" facility, to travel by bus to nearby Carindale bus station or Capalaba bus station, and beyond. Once completed, TransLink's Eastern Busway is expected to travel through Chandler, near the Sleeman Centre.

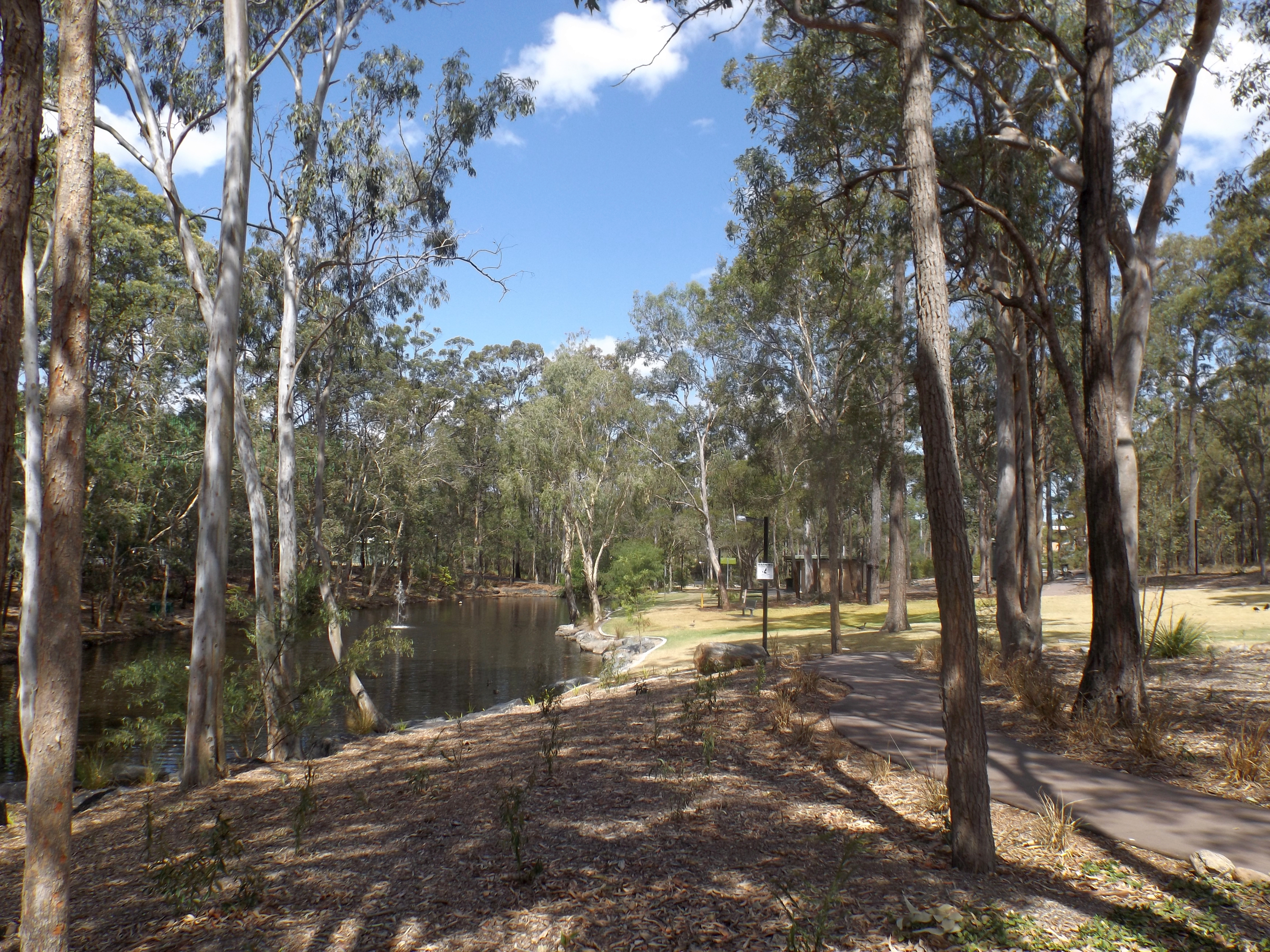
An area of bushland in Chandler, consisting of eucalyptus trees and a small lake, close to the Sleeman Sporting Complex.

There are a number of parks in the area:

- Capalaba Recreation Reserve (27.5182°S 153.1873°E)
- Sunnydene Road Park (27.5177°S 153.1915°E)
- Tilley Road Park (no. 727) (27.5176°S 153.1484°E)
- Tingalpa Creek Reserve (27.5067°S 153.1851°E)
- Toronto Road Park (no.143) (27.5138°S 153.1977°E)
- Toronto Road Park (no.173) (27.5133°S 153.1830°E)
- Tyberry Street Park (27.5176°S 153.1794°E)
