= Moreton Bay Boys' College =

Location
- Manly West, Queensland; Australia; 27°28′18″S 153°10′25.6″E

Information
- Type: Independent, day school
- Denomination: Presbyterian and Uniting Church
- Established: 2003
- Chair: Samantha O’Brien
- Principal: Andrew Holmes
- Staff: 88 (full & part-time)
- Teaching staff: 55
- Enrolment: 487 (2019) (P–11)
- Colour: Blue
- Slogan: Life adventurers. Life achievers.
- Website: www.mbbc.qld.edu.au

Moreton Bay Boys' College is an independent school for boys located in Manly West, a suburb of Brisbane, Queensland, Australia. Enrolment numbers are currently around 487.

Established in 2003 by the Presbyterian and Uniting Church, it opened in 2003 on the grounds of its sister school, Moreton Bay College, with years Prep and Year 1. In 2004 it moved to its permanent location.

== History ==
In 2003, Moreton Bay College and the Presbyterian and Methodist Schools Association entered into an agreement, establishing Moreton Bay Boys' College. A separate, not-for-profit company, Moreton Bay Boys' College Ltd (MBBC Ltd), which owns and operates the college, was incorporated on 10 April 2003.

The school opened in 2003 on vacant land at MBC, running Prep and Year 1 classes.

In 2004, MBBC added Year 2 classes and moved to its permanent home at 302 Manly Road, Manly West, located a few minutes away from Moreton Bay College.

Years 3 to 5 were added in 2005, Years 6 to 9 in 2006, Year 10 in 2008, and Year 11 in 2009, with the first Year 12s graduating from the college in 2010. The college has a maximum capacity of 750–800 students.

== House system ==
Moreton Bay Boys' College has four houses:

- Doherty House named after Peter Doherty; house colour: green
- Nicholls House named after Sir Douglas Nicholls; house colour: yellow
- Flynn House named after Reverend John Flynn; house colour: red
- Dunlop House named after Sir Edward Dunlop; house colour: blue
