= Lota House =

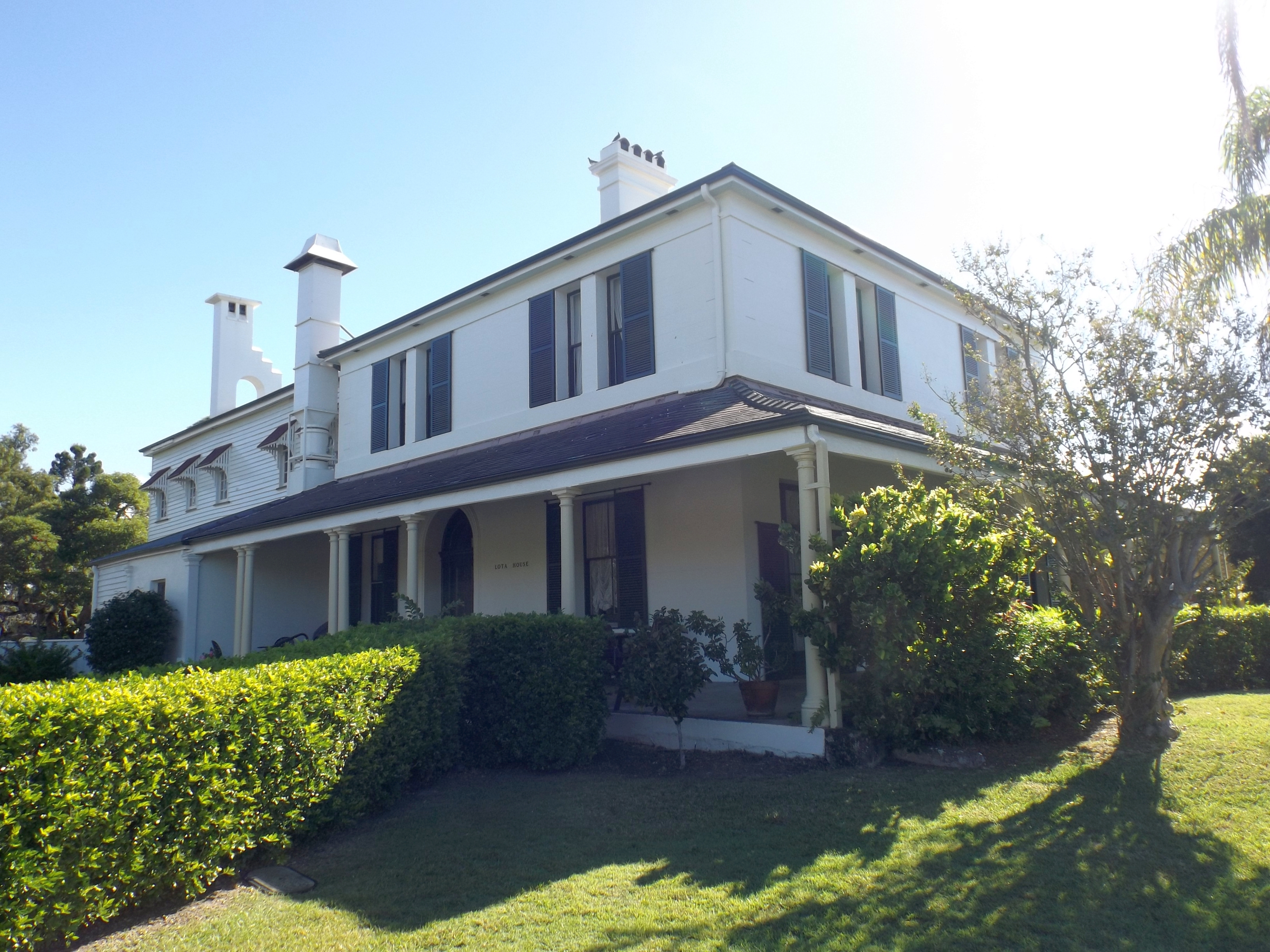
- Building in 2015

- Location within Queensland Location within Australia
- 27.4629°S 153.1892°E
- Location: 162 Oceana Terrace, Lota, City of Brisbane, Queensland, Australia

History
- Design period: 1840s–1860s (mid-19th century)
- Built: 1865 – c. 1910

Queensland Heritage Register
- Official name: Lota House – Edwin Marsden Tooth Memorial Home, Lota House
- Type: state heritage (built, landscape)
- Designated: 21 October 1992
- Reference no.: 600247
- Significant period: 1860s-1910s (fabric, historical)
- Significant components: trees/plantings, dairy/creamery, extension/s or addition/s, billiards room, driveway, tank – water (underground), natural landscape, garden/grounds, residential accommodation – main house, cellar

Lota House is a heritage-listed villa at 162 Oceana Terrace, Lota, City of Brisbane, Queensland, Australia. It was built from 1865 to c. 1910. It is also known as Edwin Marsden Tooth Memorial Home. It was added to the Queensland Heritage Register on 21 October 1992.

== History ==
The earliest section of Lota House, a substantial two-storeyed rendered brick residence, was constructed in 1865–66 for Irish born Queensland early settler, William Duckett White and his wife, Jane. Jane was the owner of Lota House until her death in 1887 when she bequeathed it to her son Albert and to William as his home for his lifetime. William Duckett White died at Lota House in 1893.

Lota was erected on approximately 240 acres (97 ha) of land. It was described by the White's son-in-law, Graham Douglas Mylne, as a grand, comfortable house with large rooms, fresh breezes, and views over Moreton Bay.

The entrance to Lota House faced south, but the principal rooms overlooked the bay to the east. A dairy was located on the southwest corner of the house, truncating the surrounding ground floor verandahs. The ground floor comprised a large entrance hall with drawing and dining rooms to the right, an office and staircase leading to the upper level on the right, a small sitting room at the end of the hall, next to which was a bootroom, and a pantry beneath the staircase, from which access to a cellar was gained. Upstairs comprised bedrooms and a dressing room. Servants' quarters and kitchen were located in a detached wing.

A pair of large white gates flanked by Moreton Bay figs (located on what is now White's Road with a gatekeeper's lodge nearby) gave access to a curved drive leading through open grass paddocks to the house, which was surrounded by extensive gardens designed by Jane White. At the rear of the house, a grassed courtyard separated it from stables, coachhouses, and haylofts opposite, and a detached kitchen wing and servants' quarters at right angles to the main building was connected to the house by a covered walkway. In the courtyard were two deep underground tanks, each covered with a large, circular-cut stone, and from these rain water was pumped to the house, kitchen, stables and garden. Further to the west, on the slope behind the stables, were yards, cow bales, fowl houses and pig styes, as well as a hut accommodating South Sea Islanders working on the property. Cows and horses grazed in the paddocks surrounding the house, and maize, sorghum and hay were grown on the flats of Lota Creek as supplementary fodder. Like most of the farmers in the district, White probably grew sugar cane on the property. The estate ran down to the bay; in the 1910s there was a boat-shed and jetty.

In 1908, William and Jane's grandson, William Duckett White (Duckett), acquired the property which he renovated and extended. The extensions were of timber and comprised a substantial two-storied wing at the rear incorporating kitchen and laundry on the ground floor and service stairs leading to a school room, spare bedroom, two bathrooms and servants' quarters on the upper floor; a single-storied day nursery on the west corner of the downstairs verandah; a separate billiard room to the northwest of the house; and a covered way and bush house roofed with wooden slats between the billiard room and the main house. Brisbane architect Claude William Chambers called tenders for the work in September 1908. At this time, the 1865–66 dining and drawing rooms were redecorated by the Sydney firm Beard Watsons with ornate timber mantelpieces (replacing earlier white marble) and new wallpapers and carpets. Duckett White also subdivided the estate, with land sales starting from 1911, and the grounds surrounding Lota House were reduced to just under 10 acres (4.0 ha). The pine trees lining the driveway from Oceana Terrace to the front of the house were most likely planted at this time.

Graham Ernest Mylne, son of Captain Graham Douglas Mylne and Helena White, purchased Lota House from his cousin Duckett White in 1913. Graham was general manager of White Collins & Co. from 1913 to 1942, and his wife Kathleen was prominently involved with the Queensland Country Women's Association. Graham Mylne died in 1958.

In 1957, businessman and philanthropist Edwin Marsden Tooth died, bequeathing £500,000 to the Anglican Church to support their schools and other charitable work with a specific request that the church establish an aged care home. The church purchased Lota House from Kathleen, widow of Graham Mylne, to establish the Edwin Marsden Tooth Memorial Home for aged care.

The remnant eucalypt woodland on the southeast and southwest perimeters of the property has been associated with Lota House from the earliest establishment of the estate. The woodland, which extends over the cliff along The Esplanade, forms a landmark in the Lota area and has been entered in the Brisbane City Council's Brisbane Conservation Atlas (prepared in the 1980s and 1990s) for its high biological and scenic values. In 1992 this woodland was subject to a BCC Vegetation Protection Order for its high scenic and landscape value.
