= Black's Camp, Wynnum =

Black's Camp or Wynnum Camp was the name for a large, permanent Aboriginal campsite established on the shores of Quandamooka (Moreton Bay) in what is now Wynnum, City of Brisbane, Queensland, Australia. Black's Camp constituted a settled Aboriginal village, similar to those noted elsewhere in Queensland by archaeologist Harry Lourandos. It was one of several permanent campsites recorded in the Wynnum district in the mid to late 1800s.

== History ==
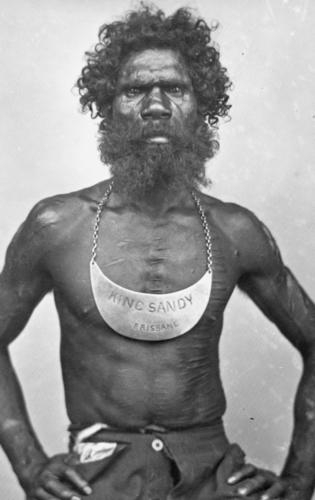
'King Sandy' Kerwalli (aka Gairballie) died at Black's Camp, Wynnum in 1900.

Thomas Petrie first described an Aboriginal camp in the Wynnum area around the 1840s, noting that residents would travel to St Helena Island to catch flying fox and collect 'cotton bush' on the Wynnum foreshore to make dilly-bags. European expansion into the Wynnum area commenced in the late 1850s around the mouth of Wynnum Creek. At this time, Black's Camp was identified on the salt flat to the north of Wynnum Creek, what is now partially covered by Greene and Elanora Parks (27.433°S 153.172°E).

Other permanent campsites were recorded in the Wynnum area at the corner of Sibley Road and Fordel Street, Wynnum West (Lindum Camp, 27.442°S 153.148°E) and on the site of the Manly Hotel, Manly (Manly Camp, 27.454°S 153.185°E). Lindum Camp was located to the immediate north of Bombarpin wetlands and became the only Aboriginal fishing reserve ever created in the southern Brisbane region.

In the 1880s, Brisbane newspapers carried advertisements for fishing and traditional hunting expeditions from Wynnum led by men living at Black's Camp. Throughout the 1880s and 1890s, the white and black community worked together in the nascent fishing industry centred on Wynnum Creek. However, there were some tensions between the original residents and the European newcomers, with a 'serious and unprovoked' attack on Black's Camp committed by 'a number of roughs' in 1884. A well-known resident of Black's Camp was 'King Sandy' Kerwalli (aka Gairballie), who died in Wynnum in May 1900.

Wynnum developed into a thriving seaside town in the early twentieth century, and many of the Black's Camp residents moved into housing and employment in the town, or moved to Stradbroke Island. Black's Camp was largely abandoned by 1908 when the Wynnum Town Council bought the land and turned it into a rubbish dump and rifle range. It was subsequently filled in and developed as a recreation reserve in the 1930s. Greene Park was re-used as a campsite between 1945 and 1948 by homeless families following the Second World War. Elanora Park continued to be referred to as 'Black's Camp' until at least the 1980s.

== In popular culture ==
Black's Camp (Winnam) is included in Quandamooka artist Megan Cope's 2014 work Twice Removed.

Brisbane author Ian Hamilton's book Meanjin Crossing is partially set in Wynnum and makes reference to Black's Camp.
