= Wynnum West =

- Suburb
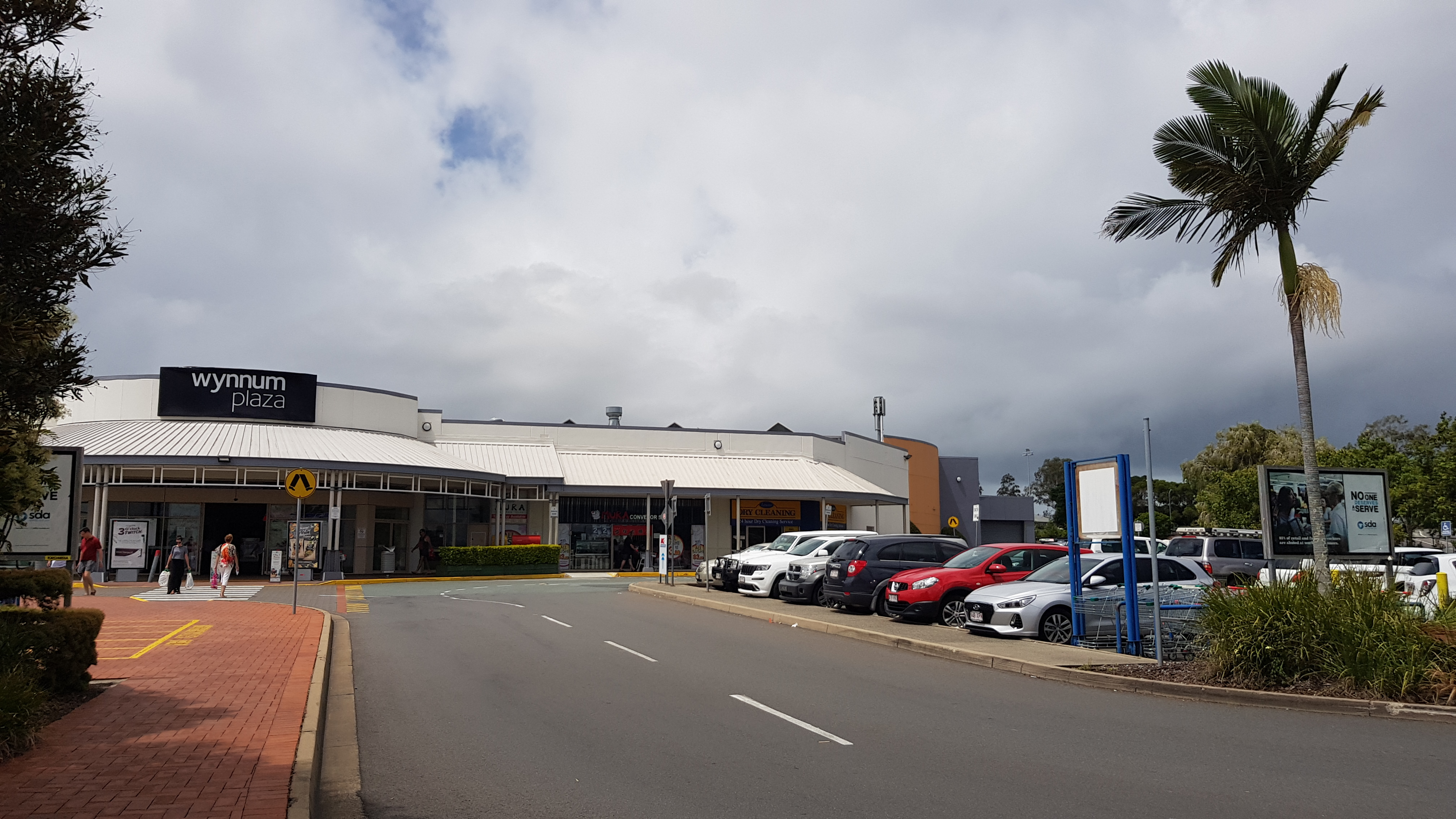
- Wynnum Plaza, 2018

- Interactive map of Wynnum West
- Coordinates: 27.4497°S 153.1538°E
- Country: Australia
- State: Queensland
- City: Brisbane
- LGA: City of Brisbane (Wynnum Manly Ward)
- Location: 17.7 km (11.0 mi) E of Brisbane CBD

Government
  - State electorate: Lytton
  - Federal division: Bonner

Area
  - Total: 5.8 km^{2} (2.2 sq mi)

Population
  - Total: 12,790 (2021 census)
  - Density: 2,205/km^{2} (5,710/sq mi)
- Time zone: UTC+10:00 (AEST)
- Postcode: 4178
Suburbs around Wynnum West
Lytton	Lytton	Wynnum
Hemmant	Wynnum West	Manly
Tingalpa	Tingalpa	Manly West

Wynnum West is an outer eastern suburb in the City of Brisbane, Queensland, Australia. In the 2021 census, Wynnum West had a population of 12,790 people.

== Geography ==
Wynnum West is located 17.7 kilometres (11.0 mi) by road east of the Brisbane GPO.

Lindum is a neighbourhood in the north-west of the suburb (27.45°S 153.15°E).

Bomparpin Swamp is a wetland (27.4461°S 153.1462°E).

== History ==
A large Jagera and Quandamooka campsite, known as Lindum Camp, was located until the 1890s at what is now the corner of Sibley Road and Fordel Street, to the immediate north and overlooking the Bombarpin lagoon (27.442°S 153.148°E). It became the only Aboriginal fishing reserve ever created in the southern Brisbane region.

The area was first settled by Europeans in the 1860s, with land use focusing on agriculture and viticulture. Aboriginal people from Lindum Camp worked in these industries alongside the newcomers. Wynnum West remained sparsely populated until the 1880s and 1890s, and it was not until the post-war years that significant development occurred.

Lindum Methodist Sunday School opened on 7 February 1914 in a barn near the Lindum railway station.

Lindum Baptist Church opened in 1920. A stump-capping ceremony was held on Saturday 4 October 1919. The church was officially opened on Sunday 25 January 1920. The church was at 95 Kianawah Road and is still extant, but no longer in use as a church. It is listed on the Brisbane Heritage Register.

Wynnum West State School opened on 15 May 1922 with 57 students who came mostly from rural families.

The suburb takes its name from the neighbouring suburb of Wynnum, which in turns takes its name from the Kabi language word winnam meaning the pandanus tree (Pandanus pedunculatus), but the Kabi language is not a local language in the area. The name Wynnum West and its boundaries were officially established by Queensland Place Names Board on 11 August 1975.

Wynnum West Mission Baptist Church opened in 1926. There was a stump-capping ceremony on Saturday 27 November 1926. It was at 2124 Wynnum Road. It is now a private residence and is listed on the Brisbane Heritage Register.

Lindum State School opened on an 8-acre (3.2 ha) site at 109 North Road (27.4375°S 153.1466°E) on 25 January 1954. It closed on 31 December 2010 as it was amalgamated with Wynnum Central State School in Florence Street, and Wynnum North State School in Prospect Street to create a new Wynnum State School. The Lindum State School site was sold to adjacent Iona College. Lindum State School's website was archived.

On Thursday 14 June 1956, the Lindum Methodist Church was officially opened at 176 Sibley Road in a small church building donated by the Australian Holiness Church and relocated to the site. The church building was believed to have been originally constructed in the late 1880s and measured 7.3 by 4.3 metres (24 ft × 14 ft). A small building for use as a hall was donated by Mrs Buzzer. It was placed behind the church and was 3.6 by 3 metres (11.8 ft × 9.8 ft). A Sunday School was re-established. By 1961 it was clear that the church building was too small with the minister having to preach from the doorway and so adjacent land was purchased to accommodate a larger church building. In November 1962 the first church and hall were relocated to the back of the site and on 7 September 1963 Reverend Tom Hardy Blackburn (the President of the Queensland Methodist Conference) laid the foundation stone for the new church, which was an A-frame structure designed by architect Neville Miller and built by Ernie Day. When the Uniting Church in Australia was established in 1977 through a merger of Methodist, Presbyterian and Congregational churches, this church became Lindum Uniting Church. In 1990 the congregation became part of the larger Bayside Uniting Church congregation but continued to hold services at the Lindum church, until 2013 when the church building needed significant expenditure to keep it safe and a decision was made to close the church with an official ceremony on 7 September 2013. The buildings were demolished and the land was used by the Wesley Mission Queensland to construct Asher House, a facility to support young people with high-care needs arising from acquired brain injury. Asher House was opened on Wednesday 20 July 2016 by Cameron Dick, Minister for Health and Ambulance Services.

Iona College was established on 28 January 1958 by the Missionary Oblates of Mary Immaculate on a 32-acre (13 ha) site on North Road provided by Archbishop James Duhig. The site was chosen because there were no Catholic schools in the area and it was close to the Lindum railway station. The first principal Father Tim Long had previously been the rector of St Patrick's College in Sri Lanka. Long and Father Denis McCarthy arrived on 1 October 1957 and had only 4 months to create the school from a site which contained only a derelict farmhouse, which was achieved with the help of local families. There were 58 students initially enrolled under four teachers: Fathers Long, McCarthy, Tom Shortall and Michael Clarke.

Formerly a suburb, Lindum became a neighbourhood in Wynnum West on 16 August 1975. The suburb of Lindum takes its name from the Lindum railway station, which was named in 1899 after the residence of ironmonger Edward Kelk (1850–1921), who named his property for the Roman name for Lincoln, England.

Bayside Uniting Church was established in 1990 in Wondall Road, Manly West, combining four Uniting Churches located at:

- Ashton Street, Wynnum, a former Methodist Church
- Kingsley Terrace, Manly, a former Methodist Church
- Preston Road, Manly West, a former Methodist Church
- Yamboyna Street, Manly, a former Congregational Church

Due to earlier or later closures, the Bayside Uniting Church also incorporated congregations from:

- "The Springs" Methodist Church in Manly Road, Manly West
- Lota Methodist Church in Ambool Street, Lota
- Lindum Methodist Church at Sibley Road, Wynnum West
- Hemmant Methodist Church in Hemmant-Tingalpa Road, Hemmant

The population has continued to increase since the 1990s as a result of more dwellings being constructed, and the suburb is now largely residential with a small commercial area on Wynnum Road.

Brisbane Bayside State College opened on 1 January 2010. It was previously Wynnum North State High School which originally opened in 1964 in Stradbroke Avenue (27.4400°S 153.1620°E) but was relocated the present site and renamed to accommodate the establishment of a new Wynnum State School at the Stradbroke Avenue site, which was an amalgamation of three primary schools: Wynnum Central State School in Florence Street, Wynnum North State School in Prospect Street and Lindum State School at North Road.

== Demographics ==
Census Date	Population
1954	387
1961	4,268 (estimated)
1976	7,769
1991	8,784
2001	10,547
2006	10,754
2011	11,745
2016	12,292
2021	12,790

In the 2011 census, Wynnum West had a population of 11,745 people, 51.4% female and 48.6% male. The median age of the Wynnum West population was 38 years, one year above the Australian median. 72% of people living in Wynnum West were born in Australia, compared to the national average of 69.8%; the next most common countries of birth were New Zealand 7.4%, England 4.5%, Philippines 1.6%, South Africa 1.1%, Scotland 0.7%. 86.9% of people spoke only English at home; the next most common languages were 0.7% Mandarin, 0.6% Tagalog, 0.6% Filipino, 0.6% Spanish, 0.5% Hindi.

In the 2016 census, Wynnum West had a population of 12,292 people.

In the 2021 census, Wynnum West had a population of 12,790 people.

== Heritage listings ==
There are a number of heritage-listed sites in the suburb, including:

- former Lindum Baptist Church, 95 Kianawah Road (27.4477°S 153.1429°E)
- Old Brisbane City Hall Fountain, Preston Road (27.4543°S 153.1672°E)
- former Wynnum West Baptist Church, 2124 Wynnum Road (27.4492°S 153.1573°E)

== Amenities ==
The Wynnum Plaza at 2021 Wynnum Road (27.4569°S 153.1546°E) is the major shopping centre within the bayside area. It contains Woolworths, Coles, Kmart, Fitness First, Dan Murphy's and 59 specialty stores.

Other amenities include Bayside BMX Club, Bayside Heritage Train Park, Durrington Park, and Edward Kelk Park.

Wesley Mission Queensland (a not-for-profit community service provider operated by the Uniting Church in Australia) operates an aged care facility at and a facility for young people with high care needs in Sibley Road

== Education ==
Wynnum West State School is a government primary (Prep to Year 6) school for boys and girls at 2036 Wynnum Road (27.4549°S 153.1545°E). In 2010 it had which 491 students. In 2018, the school had an enrolment of 434 students with 36 teachers (29 full-time equivalent) and 21 non-teaching staff (13 full-time equivalent). It includes a special education program.

Iona College is a Catholic primary and secondary (Years 5 to 12) school for boys at 85 North Road (27.4384°S 153.1456°E). In 2018, the school had an enrolment of 1,588 students with 123 teachers (117 full-time equivalent) and 71 non-teaching staff (58 full-time equivalent).

Brisbane Bayside State College is a government secondary (Years 7 to 12) school for boys and girls at Network Drive (27.4619°S 153.1499°E). In 2018, the school had an enrolment of 861 students with 76 teachers (71 full-time equivalent) and 43 non-teaching staff (31 full-time equivalent). It includes a special education program.

== Transport ==
Lindum railway station (27.4420°S 153.1449°E) provides access to regular Queensland Rail City network services to Brisbane and Cleveland.

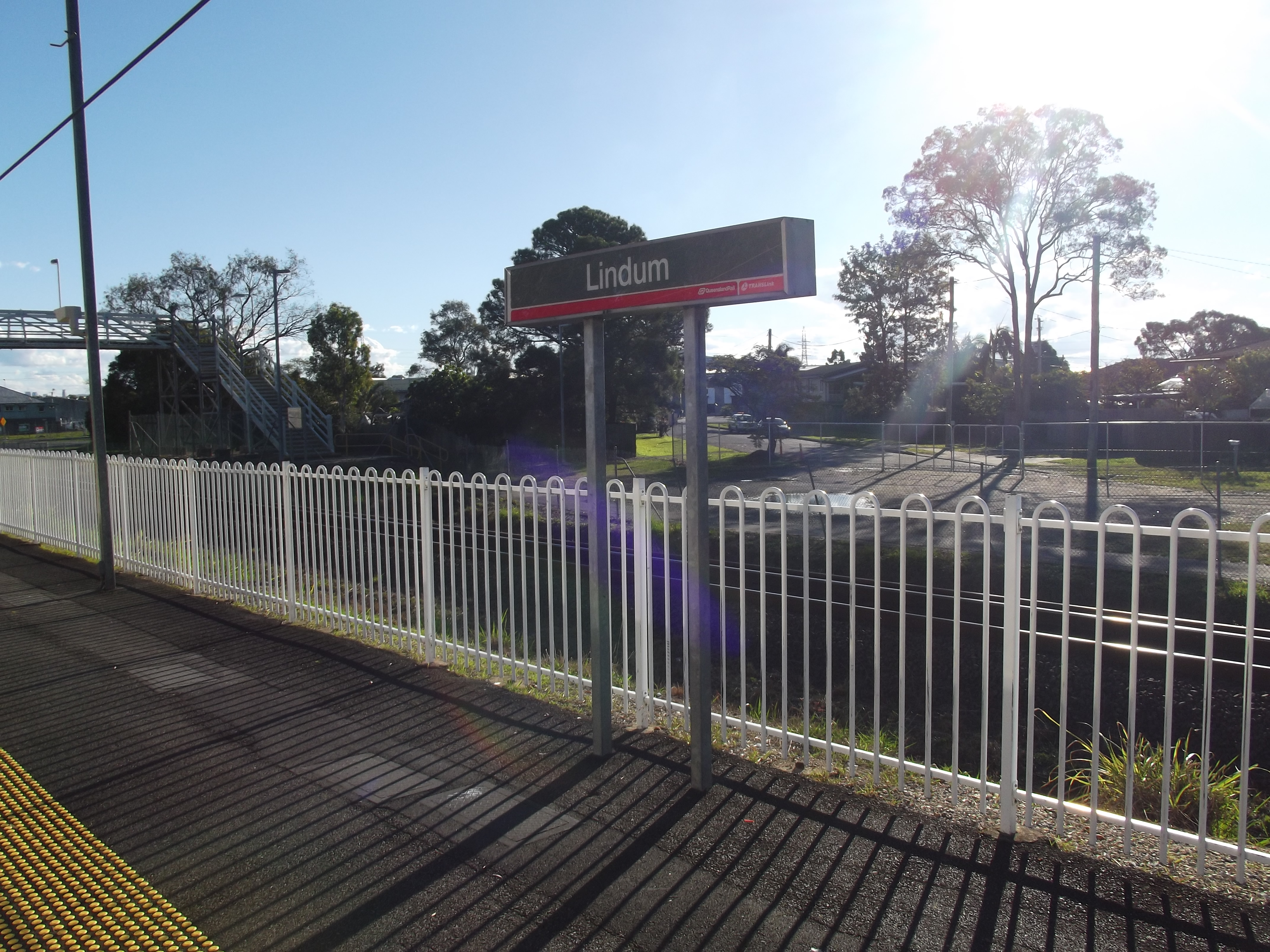
Lindum Railway Station, Queensland, July 2012
