= Wynnum State High School =

Secondary school in Queensland, Australia

Wynnum State High School (WSHS)

Location
- Peel Street; Manly, Queensland, 4179; Australia; 27.4550°S 153.1765°E

Information
- Type: State, secondary
- Motto: Latin: Semper Fidelis (Always Faithful)
- Opened: 2 March 1942
- Enrolment: 1,943 (2019) (2010)
- Campus: Surburban
- Colours: Green, gray and black
- Slogan: We’re Wynnum, We’re Proud
- Website: wynnumshs.eq.edu.au
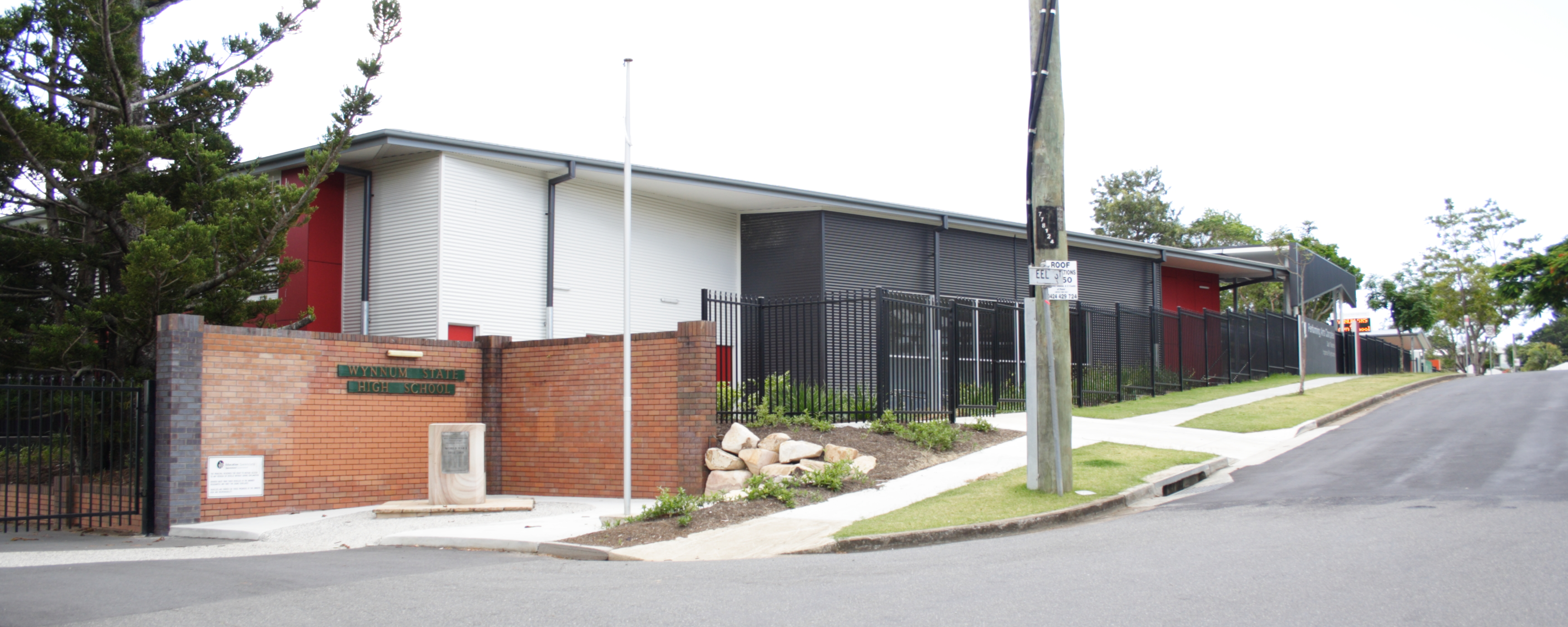
- Peet Street Entrance

Wynnum State High School is a public, co-educational secondary school located in the Brisbane suburb of Wynnum, Queensland, Australia.

== History ==
Construction began in 1941, and the school first opened for students on 2 March 1942.

Facilities at the school include:

- Basketball courts
- Pool
- Large sports oval
- Assembly hall
- Multi-Purpose Sports (MPS)
- Multiple classroom buildings
- Amphitheatre
- Technology Studios
- Science labs
- library
- Canteen

Construction also recently finished on a new block of four classrooms, dubbed the Russell Building or R Block (November, 2018). Later, it underwent construction to include 3 other classrooms.

== Notable alumni ==
- Warner Batchelor, Olympic boxer (1956)
- Carolyn Crudgington, Olympic softball player (1996)
- Robyn Forbes, Olympic trampoline gymnast (2000)
- Belle Gibson, criminal
- Caroline Hildreth, Olympic swimmer (1996)
- Robbie Peden, Olympic boxer (1996)
- Samantha Riley, Olympic swimmer (1992, 1996)
- Kyle Sandilands, radio host and television personality
