= Wynnum North =

Wynnum North may refer to:

- Wynnum, Queensland
- Wynnum North railway station
