= Electoral results for the district of Sandgate =

Electoral results for Sandgate, Queensland, Australia

This is a list of electoral results for the electoral district of Sandgate in Queensland state elections.

== Members for Sandgate ==
Member	Party	Term
Hubert Sizer	United Party/Country and Progressive National	1923–1935
Roland Hislop	Labor	1935–1941
Eric Decker	Country/Queensland People's/Liberal	1941–1953
Herbert Robinson	Labor	1953–1957
Herbert Robinson	Queensland Labor	1957
Thomas Ahearn	Liberal	1957–1960
Harry Dean	Labor	1960–1977
Nev Warburton	Labor	1977–1992
Gordon Nuttall	Labor	1992–2006
Vicky Darling	Labor	2006–2012
Kerry Millard	Liberal National	2012–2015
Stirling Hinchliffe	Labor	2015–2024
Bisma Asif	Labor	2024–present

== Election results ==
=== Elections in the 2020s ===
2024 Queensland state election: Sandgate
Party	Candidate	Votes	%	±%
Labor	Bisma Asif	15,703	45.94	−8.56
Liberal National	Chris Mangan	11,497	33.64	+6.94
Greens	Rachel Kennedy	3,896	11.40	−0.40
One Nation	Glen Barry	1,356	3.97	−1.23
Independent Democrat	Chris Simpson	892	2.61	+2.61
Family First	Russell Gee	611	1.79	+1.79
Independent	Victor Barwick	223	0.65	+0.65
Total formal votes		34,178	96.09	
Informal votes		1,389	3.91	
Turnout		35,567	91.57	
Two-party-preferred result
Labor	Bisma Asif	20,372	59.61	−7.69
Liberal National	Chris Mangan	13,806	40.39	+7.69
Labor hold		Swing	-7.69	

2020 Queensland state election: Sandgate
Party	Candidate	Votes	%	±%
Labor	Stirling Hinchliffe	17,777	54.59	+5.44
Liberal National	Clark Siemsen	8,712	26.75	+3.52
Greens	Miree Le Roy	3,825	11.75	−0.92
One Nation	Rodney Miles	1,693	5.20	−9.75
Independent	Todd Milham	558	1.71	+1.71
Total formal votes		32,565	97.29	+0.81
Informal votes		908	2.71	−0.81
Turnout		33,473	90.82	+0.55
Two-party-preferred result
Labor	Stirling Hinchliffe	21,916	67.30	+3.82
Liberal National	Clark Siemsen	10,649	32.70	−3.82
Labor hold		Swing	+3.82	

=== Elections in the 2010s ===
2017 Queensland state election: Sandgate
Party	Candidate	Votes	%	±%
Labor	Stirling Hinchliffe	15,460	49.1	−0.6
Liberal National	Jessie Van Der Hoek	7,308	23.2	−13.5
One Nation	Matthew Stephen	4,703	15.0	+15.0
Greens	Miree Le Roy	3,985	12.7	+2.4
Total formal votes		31,456	96.5	−1.6
Informal votes		1,150	3.5	+1.6
Turnout		32,606	90.3	+1.3
Two-party-preferred result
Labor	Stirling Hinchliffe	19,969	63.5	+3.4
Liberal National	Jessie Van Der Hoek	11,487	36.5	−3.4
Labor hold		Swing	+3.4	

2015 Queensland state election: Sandgate
Party	Candidate	Votes	%	±%
Labor	Stirling Hinchliffe	14,802	49.74	+12.09
Liberal National	Kerry Millard	10,967	36.85	−6.90
Greens	John Harbison	3,033	10.19	+1.21
Independent	Hamish Gray	959	3.22	+1.58
Total formal votes		29,761	98.09	+0.33
Informal votes		580	1.91	−0.33
Turnout		30,341	91.90	−1.16
Two-party-preferred result
Labor	Stirling Hinchliffe	17,262	60.10	+12.97
Liberal National	Kerry Millard	11,462	39.90	−12.97
Labor gain from Liberal National		Swing	+12.97	

2012 Queensland state election: Sandgate
Party	Candidate	Votes	%	±%
Liberal National	Kerry Millard	12,096	43.75	+11.41
Labor	Vicky Darling	10,408	37.64	−16.41
Greens	Claire Ogden	2,483	8.98	+0.78
Katter's Australian	John Dunkley	1,458	5.27	+5.27
Family First	Penny McCreery	751	2.72	+0.53
Independent	Mike Crook	454	1.64	+0.31
Total formal votes		27,650	97.76	−0.38
Informal votes		633	2.24	+0.38
Turnout		28,283	93.06	+0.18
Two-party-preferred result
Liberal National	Kerry Millard	13,228	52.87	+15.24
Labor	Vicky Darling	11,794	47.13	−15.24
Liberal National gain from Labor		Swing	+15.24	

=== Elections in the 2000s ===
2009 Queensland state election: Sandgate
Party	Candidate	Votes	%	±%
Labor	Vicky Darling	14,708	54.0	−2.0
Liberal National	Lenard Gaffel	8,800	32.3	+4.1
Greens	Keith Skelton	2,231	8.2	+0.8
Family First	Mark Grundy	597	2.2	−4.7
Independent	Kevin Stiller	516	1.9	+1.9
Independent	Mike Crook	361	1.3	+1.3
Total formal votes		27,213	98.0	
Informal votes		515	2.0	
Turnout		27,728	92.9	
Two-party-preferred result
Labor	Vicky Darling	15,880	62.4	−2.9
Liberal National	Lenard Gaffel	9,581	37.6	+2.9
Labor hold		Swing	−2.9	

2006 Queensland state election: Sandgate
Party	Candidate	Votes	%	±%
Labor	Vicky Darling	13,756	55.9	+1.7
Liberal	Alan Boulton	6,937	28.2	−2.0
Greens	Peter Fagan	1,816	7.4	−5.9
Family First	Sally Vincent	1,765	7.2	+7.2
Independent	Ronny Eaton	321	1.3	+0.2
Total formal votes		24,595	97.8	−0.2
Informal votes		563	2.2	+0.2
Turnout		25,158	91.9	−0.9
Two-party-preferred result
Labor	Vicky Darling	14,845	65.2	+1.2
Liberal	Alan Boulton	7,927	34.8	−1.2
Labor hold		Swing	+1.2	

2004 Queensland state election: Sandgate
Party	Candidate	Votes	%	±%
Labor	Gordon Nuttall	13,235	54.2	−12.6
Liberal	Luke Howarth	7,381	30.2	+10.1
Greens	Susan Black	3,253	13.3	+13.3
Independent	Ron Eaton	279	1.1	−12.0
Independent	Rod McDonough	259	1.1	+1.1
Total formal votes		24,407	98.0	+0.3
Informal votes		505	2.0	−0.3
Turnout		24,912	92.8	−1.3
Two-party-preferred result
Labor	Gordon Nuttall	14,258	64.0	−10.5
Liberal	Luke Howarth	8,022	36.0	+10.5
Labor hold		Swing	−10.5	

2001 Queensland state election: Sandgate
Party	Candidate	Votes	%	±%
Labor	Gordon Nuttall	16,242	66.8	+17.4
Liberal	Don Young	4,890	20.1	-0.0
Independent	Ron Eaton	3,179	13.1	+13.1
Total formal votes		24,311	97.7	
Informal votes		565	2.3	
Turnout		24,876	94.1	
Two-party-preferred result
Labor	Gordon Nuttall	16,774	74.5	+8.5
Liberal	Don Young	5,750	25.5	−8.5
Labor hold		Swing	+8.5	

=== Elections in the 1990s ===
1998 Queensland state election: Sandgate
Party	Candidate	Votes	%	±%
Labor	Gordon Nuttall	11,155	49.4	−6.6
Liberal	Don Young	4,546	20.1	−19.7
One Nation	Elizabeth Thurman	4,176	18.5	+18.5
Independent	Anne Hobbs	1,812	8.0	+8.0
Greens	Peter Burgoyne	631	2.8	+2.8
Reform	Fay Mills	243	1.1	+1.1
Total formal votes		22,563	98.5	+0.5
Informal votes		340	1.5	−0.5
Turnout		22,903	93.4	+0.8
Two-party-preferred result
Labor	Gordon Nuttall	13,272	66.0	+8.1
Liberal	Don Young	6,841	34.0	−8.1
Labor hold		Swing	+8.1	

1995 Queensland state election: Sandgate
Party	Candidate	Votes	%	±%
Labor	Gordon Nuttall	11,843	56.1	−10.3
Liberal	Anne Hobbs	8,414	39.8	+6.3
Confederate Action	Steve Purtill	859	4.1	+4.1
Total formal votes		21,116	98.0	+1.0
Informal votes		429	2.0	−1.0
Turnout		21,545	92.6	
Two-party-preferred result
Labor	Gordon Nuttall	12,130	57.9	−8.5
Liberal	Anne Hobbs	8,823	42.1	+8.5
Labor hold		Swing	−8.5	

1992 Queensland state election: Sandgate
Party	Candidate	Votes	%	±%
Labor	Gordon Nuttall	13,572	66.4	−0.5
Liberal	Rob Dixon	6,858	33.6	+11.7
Total formal votes		20,430	97.0	
Informal votes		620	3.0	
Turnout		21,050	93.1	
Labor hold		Swing	−1.3	

=== Elections in the 1980s ===
1989 Queensland state election: Sandgate
Party	Candidate	Votes	%	±%
Labor	Nev Warburton	12,839	66.5	+7.3
Liberal	Ron Nankervis	4,308	22.3	+6.1
National	Stephen Purtill	2,171	11.2	−13.5
Total formal votes		19,318	97.0	−1.0
Informal votes		587	3.0	+1.0
Turnout		19,905	91.7	−1.0
Two-party-preferred result
Labor	Nev Warburton	13,001	67.3	+3.6
Liberal	Ron Nankervis	6,317	32.7	+32.7
Labor hold		Swing	+3.6	

1986 Queensland state election: Sandgate
Party	Candidate	Votes	%	±%
Labor	Nev Warburton	10,635	59.2	−0.7
National	John Curtin	4,428	24.6	−2.9
Liberal	Ivan Storey	2,904	16.2	+3.6
Total formal votes		17,967	98.0	
Informal votes		369	2.0	
Turnout		18,336	92.7	
Two-party-preferred result
Labor	Nev Warburton	11,445	63.7	+2.5
National	John Curtin	6,522	36.3	−2.5
Labor hold		Swing	+2.5	

1983 Queensland state election: Sandgate
Party	Candidate	Votes	%	±%
Labor	Nev Warburton	9,023	59.9	−0.6
National	Ian Armstrong	4,135	27.5	+27.5
Liberal	Ian Parminter	1,895	12.6	−14.5
Total formal votes		15,053	98.4	0.0
Informal votes		244	1.6	0.0
Turnout		15,297	92.2	+2.8
Two-party-preferred result
Labor	Nev Warburton	9,446	62.8	−1.8
National	Ian Armstrong	5,607	37.2	+37.2
Labor hold		Swing	−1.8	

1980 Queensland state election: Sandgate
Party	Candidate	Votes	%	±%
Labor	Nev Warburton	8,971	60.5	+4.5
Liberal	David Preston	4,027	27.1	−2.4
Coalitionist	Peter Jackman	1,530	10.3	+10.3
Independent	Anthony Catip	309	2.1	+2.1
Total formal votes		14,837	98.4	+0.1
Informal votes		240	1.6	−0.1
Turnout		15,077	89.4	−2.9
Two-party-preferred result
Labor	Nev Warburton	9,585	64.6	+6.6
Liberal	David Preston	5,252	35.4	−6.6
Labor hold		Swing	+6.6	

=== Elections in the 1970s ===
1977 Queensland state election: Sandgate
Party	Candidate	Votes	%	±%
Labor	Nev Warburton	8,306	56.0	+4.0
Liberal	Donald Connolly	4,385	29.5	−18.5
National	Peter Jackman	2,153	14.5	+14.5
Total formal votes		14,844	98.3	
Informal votes		251	1.7	
Turnout		15,095	92.3	
Two-party-preferred result
Labor	Nev Warburton	8,607	58.0	+6.0
Liberal	Donald Connolly	6,237	42.0	−6.0
Labor hold		Swing	+6.0	

1974 Queensland state election: Sandgate
Party	Candidate	Votes	%	±%
Labor	Harry Dean	6,758	53.5	−8.2
Liberal	Malcolm Thompson	5,870	46.5	+23.4
Total formal votes		12,628	97.6	−0.6
Informal votes		316	2.4	+0.6
Turnout		12,944	91.7	−0.3
Labor hold		Swing	−10.1	

1972 Queensland state election: Sandgate
Party	Candidate	Votes	%	±%
Labor	Harry Dean	7,184	61.7	−1.5
Liberal	Ivan Brown	2,684	23.1	−4.0
Queensland Labor	Bernard Beston	1,770	15.2	+5.5
Total formal votes		11,638	98.2	
Informal votes		208	1.8	
Turnout		11,846	92.0	
Two-party-preferred result
Labor	Harry Dean	7,399	63.6	−2.5
Liberal	Ivan Brown	4,239	36.4	+2.5
Labor hold		Swing	−2.5	

=== Elections in the 1960s ===
1969 Queensland state election: Sandgate
Party	Candidate	Votes	%	±%
Labor	Harry Dean	7,431	63.2	+0.3
Liberal	Colin Clark	3,190	27.1	−4.1
Queensland Labor	Bernard Beston	1,146	9.7	+3.8
Total formal votes		11,767	98.3	+0.1
Informal votes		205	1.7	−0.1
Turnout		11,972	92.1	−0.3
Two-party-preferred result
Labor	Harry Dean	7,612	64.7	+0.7
Liberal	Colin Clark	4,155	35.3	−0.7
Labor hold		Swing	+0.7	

1966 Queensland state election: Sandgate
Party	Candidate	Votes	%	±%
Labor	Harry Dean	7,087	62.9	+7.5
Liberal	Colin Clark	3,510	31.2	−6.0
Queensland Labor	Reginald Lincoln	666	5.9	−1.5
Total formal votes		11,263	98.2	−0.3
Informal votes		202	1.8	+0.3
Turnout		11,465	92.4	−2.3
Two-party-preferred result
Labor	Harry Dean	7,211	64.0	+7.2
Liberal	Colin Clark	4,052	36.0	−7.2
Labor hold		Swing	+7.2	

1963 Queensland state election: Sandgate
Party	Candidate	Votes	%	±%
Labor	Harry Dean	5,765	55.4	+4.6
Liberal	Maurice White	3,866	37.2	−4.6
Queensland Labor	Austin McShane	767	7.4	0.0
Total formal votes		10,398	98.5	−0.2
Informal votes		160	1.5	+0.2
Turnout		10,558	94.7	+2.4
Two-party-preferred result
Labor	Harry Dean	5,908	56.8	
Liberal	Maurice White	4,490	43.2	
Labor hold		Swing	N/A	

1960 Queensland state election: Sandgate
Party	Candidate	Votes	%	±%
Labor	Harry Dean	4,990	50.8	
Liberal	Thomas Ahearn	4,112	41.8	
Queensland Labor	Hindrick Lokhorst	727	7.4	
Total formal votes		9,829	98.7	
Informal votes		126	1.3	
Turnout		9,955	92.3	
Labor gain from Liberal		Swing		

=== Elections in the 1950s ===
1957 Queensland state election: Sandgate
Party	Candidate	Votes	%	±%
Liberal	Thomas Ahearn	6,620	37.2	−6.2
Labor	Harold Dean	6,323	35.5	−21.1
Queensland Labor	Herbert Robinson	4,867	27.3	+27.3
Total formal votes		17,810	99.0	+0.2
Informal votes		173	1.0	−0.2
Turnout		17,983	95.3	+2.0
Liberal gain from Labor		Swing	+7.7	

1956 Queensland state election: Sandgate
Party	Candidate	Votes	%	±%
Labor	Herbert Robinson	9,562	56.6	+0.7
Liberal	Thomas Ahearn	7,340	43.4	−0.7
Total formal votes		16,902	98.8	+0.2
Informal votes		210	1.2	−0.2
Turnout		17,112	93.3	−0.7
Labor hold		Swing	+0.7	

1953 Queensland state election: Sandgate
Party	Candidate	Votes	%	±%
Labor	Herbert Robinson	8,047	55.9	+9.9
Liberal	Eric Decker	6,338	44.1	−9.9
Total formal votes		14,385	98.6	0.0
Informal votes		209	1.4	0.0
Turnout		14,594	94.0	−0.3
Labor gain from Liberal		Swing	+9.9	

1950 Queensland state election: Sandgate
Party	Candidate	Votes	%	±%
Liberal	Eric Decker	6,193	54.0	
Labor	Herbert Robinson	5,273	46.0	
Total formal votes		11,466	98.6	
Informal votes		168	1.4	
Turnout		11,634	94.3	
Liberal hold		Swing		

=== Elections in the 1940s ===
1947 Queensland state election: Sandgate
Party	Candidate	Votes	%	±%
People's Party	Eric Decker	7,904	58.3	−1.2
Labor	Ron McAuliffe	5,664	41.7	+1.2
Total formal votes		13,568	98.8	+0.1
Informal votes		160	1.2	−0.1
Turnout		13,728	93.5	+3.3
People's Party hold		Swing	−1.2	

1944 Queensland state election: Sandgate
Party	Candidate	Votes	%	±%
People's Party	Eric Decker	6,613	59.5	+35.6
Labor	Erle Wettemeyer	4,501	40.5	+1.8
Total formal votes		11,114	98.7	+0.9
Informal votes		141	1.3	−0.9
Turnout		11,255	90.2	−2.9
People's Party gain from Country		Swing	N/A	

1941 Queensland state election: Sandgate
Party	Candidate	Votes	%	±%
Labor	Roland Hislop	3,969	38.7	−6.7
Country	Eric Decker	3,936	37.4	+37.4
United Australia	James Fry	2,457	23.9	−14.8
Total formal votes		10,292	97.8	−1.0
Informal votes		231	2.2	+1.0
Turnout		10,493	93.1	−2.4
Two-party-preferred result
Country	Eric Decker	4,915	54.5	+54.5
Labor	Roland Hislop	4,105	45.5	−6.8
Country gain from Labor		Swing	N/A	

=== Elections in the 1930s ===
1938 Queensland state election: Sandgate
Party	Candidate	Votes	%	±%
Labor	Roland Hislop	4,515	45.4	−9.6
United Australia	James Fry	3,849	38.7	−6.3
Protestant Labour	Richard Vane-Millbank	1,237	12.5	+12.5
Social Credit	Leonard Jones	336	3.4	+3.4
Total formal votes		9,937	98.8	+0.3
Informal votes		116	1.2	−0.3
Turnout		10,053	95.5	+0.6
Two-party-preferred result
Labor	Roland Hislop	4,801	52.3	−2.7
United Australia	James Fry	4,386	47.7	+2.7
Labor hold		Swing	−2.7	

1935 Queensland state election: Sandgate
Party	Candidate	Votes	%	±%
Labor	Roland Hislop	4,920	55.0	
CPNP	James Kenny	4,029	45.0	
Total formal votes		8,949	98.5	
Informal votes		137	1.5	
Turnout		9,086	94.9	
Labor gain from CPNP		Swing		

1932 Queensland state election: Sandgate
Party	Candidate	Votes	%	±%
CPNP	Hubert Sizer	4,711	50.8	
Labor	Herbert McPhail	4,194	45.2	
Queensland Party	Benjamin White	374	4.0	
Total formal votes		9,279	99.2	
Informal votes		76	0.8	
Turnout		9,355	94.7	
CPNP hold		Swing		

- Preferences were not distributed.

=== Elections in the 1920s ===
1929 Queensland state election: Sandgate
Party	Candidate	Votes	%	±%
CPNP	Hubert Sizer	4,796	55.4	−4.4
Labor	Jack Kavanagh	2,811	32.5	−7.7
Independent	William Childs	1,050	12.1	+12.1
Total formal votes		8,657	98.0	−1.0
Informal votes		175	2.0	+1.0
Turnout		8,832	93.9	+3.4
CPNP hold		Swing	N/A	

1926 Queensland state election: Sandgate
Party	Candidate	Votes	%	±%
CPNP	Hubert Sizer	4,739	59.8	−3.2
Labor	James Weir	3,185	40.2	+40.2
Total formal votes		7,924	99.0	+4.8
Informal votes		79	1.0	−4.8
Turnout		8,003	90.5	+12.9
CPNP hold		Swing	N/A	

1923 Queensland state election: Sandgate
Party	Candidate	Votes	%	±%
United	Hubert Sizer	3,863	63.0	
Independent	Thomas Coaldrake	2,273	37.0	
Total formal votes		6,136	94.2	
Informal votes		377	5.8	
Turnout		6,513	77.6	
United hold		Swing		
