= Electoral results for the district of Nudgee =

Queensland, Australia, district election results

This is a list of electoral results for the electoral district of Nudgee in Queensland state elections.

== Members for Nudgee ==
Member	Party	Term
Jack Melloy	Labor	1960–1977
Ken Vaughan	Labor	1977–1995
Neil Roberts	Labor	1995–2012
Jason Woodforth	Liberal National	2012–2015
Leanne Linard	Labor	2015–present

== Election results ==
=== Elections in the 2020s ===
2024 Queensland state election: Nudgee
Party	Candidate	Votes	%	±%
Labor	Leanne Linard	16,860	48.20	−3.30
Liberal National	Robert Wilson	11,137	31.84	+1.84
Greens	Jim Davies	4,721	13.50	+0.30
One Nation	Joshua Baer	1,248	3.57	+0.07
Family First	Sharan Hall	591	1.69	+1.69
Independent	Bruce Tanti	419	1.20	+1.20
Total formal votes		34,976	97.08	
Informal votes		1,053	2.92	
Turnout		36,029	89.80	
Two-party-preferred result
Labor	Leanne Linard	21,686	62.00	−3.10
Liberal National	Robert Wilson	13,290	38.00	+3.10
Labor hold		Swing	–3.10	

2020 Queensland state election: Nudgee
Party	Candidate	Votes	%	±%
Labor	Leanne Linard	16,836	51.46	−0.39
Liberal National	Ryan Shaw	9,818	30.01	+1.31
Greens	Jim Davies	4,327	13.23	−0.10
One Nation	Carrol Halliwell	1,149	3.51	+3.51
Informed Medical Options	Dane Pritchard	584	1.79	+1.79
Total formal votes		32,714	97.50	+1.46
Informal votes		839	2.50	−1.46
Turnout		33,553	88.66	+0.49
Two-party-preferred result
Labor	Leanne Linard	21,292	65.09	+0.76
Liberal National	Ryan Shaw	11,422	34.91	−0.76
Labor hold		Swing	+0.76	

=== Elections in the 2010s ===
2017 Queensland state election: Nudgee
Party	Candidate	Votes	%	±%
Labor	Leanne Linard	16,074	51.9	+4.0
Liberal National	Debbie Glaze	8,896	28.7	−7.1
Greens	Ell-Leigh Ackerman	4,130	13.3	+3.4
Independent	Anthony Simpson	1,899	6.1	+6.1
Total formal votes		30,999	96.0	−2.3
Informal votes		1,277	4.0	+2.3
Turnout		32,276	88.2	+1.3
Two-party-preferred result
Labor	Leanne Linard	19,940	64.3	+5.1
Liberal National	Debbie Glaze	11,059	35.7	−5.1
Labor hold		Swing	+5.1	

2015 Queensland state election: Nudgee
Party	Candidate	Votes	%	±%
Labor	Leanne Linard	15,470	49.69	+12.20
Liberal National	Jason Woodforth	10,531	33.82	−10.67
Greens	Claire Ogden	2,979	9.57	+1.48
Palmer United	Peter Dufficy	1,361	4.37	+4.37
Independent	Edward Monaei	793	2.55	+2.55
Total formal votes		31,134	98.24	+0.43
Informal votes		559	1.76	−0.43
Turnout		31,693	90.30	−1.80
Two-party-preferred result
Labor	Leanne Linard	18,046	61.25	+14.36
Liberal National	Jason Woodforth	11,418	38.75	−14.36
Labor gain from Liberal National		Swing	+14.36	

2012 Queensland state election: Nudgee
Party	Candidate	Votes	%	±%
Liberal National	Jason Woodforth	12,862	44.49	+13.55
Labor	Leanne Linard	10,837	37.49	−18.48
Greens	Anthony Pink	2,337	8.08	−0.71
Katter's Australian	Terri Bell	1,953	6.76	+6.76
Family First	Claude Gonsalves	571	1.98	−0.46
Independent	Douglas Crowhurst	349	1.21	−0.65
Total formal votes		28,909	97.81	−0.42
Informal votes		647	2.19	+0.42
Turnout		29,556	92.10	+0.45
Two-party-preferred result
Liberal National	Jason Woodforth	13,932	53.11	+17.37
Labor	Leanne Linard	12,300	46.89	−17.37
Liberal National gain from Labor		Swing	+17.37	

=== Elections in the 2000s ===
2009 Queensland state election: Nudgee
Party	Candidate	Votes	%	±%
Labor	Neil Roberts	16,034	56.0	−5.4
Liberal National	Michael Palmer	8,864	30.9	+2.8
Greens	Noel Clothier	2,517	8.8	−1.4
Family First	Centaine Francis	700	2.4	+2.4
Independent	Douglas Crowhurst	534	1.9	+1.9
Total formal votes		28,649	98.1	
Informal votes		517	1.9	
Turnout		29,166	91.7	
Two-party-preferred result
Labor	Neil Roberts	17,318	64.3	−3.9
Liberal National	Michael Palmer	9,633	35.7	+3.9
Labor hold		Swing	−3.9	

2006 Queensland state election: Nudgee
Party	Candidate	Votes	%	±%
Labor	Neil Roberts	14,851	61.6	−1.8
Liberal	Max Swanson	6,754	28.0	+0.3
Greens	Noel Clothier	2,497	10.4	+1.5
Total formal votes		24,102	98.0	−0.1
Informal votes		494	2.0	+0.1
Turnout		24,596	91.5	−0.7
Two-party-preferred result
Labor	Neil Roberts	15,744	68.3	−1.0
Liberal	Max Swanson	7,294	31.7	+1.0
Labor hold		Swing	−1.0	

2004 Queensland state election: Nudgee
Party	Candidate	Votes	%	±%
Labor	Neil Roberts	15,421	63.4	−11.7
Liberal	Lorne Thurgar	6,725	27.7	+2.8
Greens	Mark Carey-Smith	2,167	8.9	+8.9
Total formal votes		24,313	98.1	+1.6
Informal votes		464	1.9	−1.6
Turnout		24,777	92.2	−1.5
Two-party-preferred result
Labor	Neil Roberts	16,182	69.3	−5.8
Liberal	Lorne Thurgar	7,160	30.7	+5.8
Labor hold		Swing	−5.8	

2001 Queensland state election: Nudgee
Party	Candidate	Votes	%	±%
Labor	Neil Roberts	18,252	75.1	+19.9
Liberal	Scott Taylor	6,042	24.9	+1.6
Total formal votes		24,294	96.5	
Informal votes		882	3.5	
Turnout		25,176	93.7	
Labor hold		Swing	+8.7	

=== Elections in the 1990s ===
1998 Queensland state election: Nudgee
Party	Candidate	Votes	%	±%
Labor	Neil Roberts	11,788	55.9	−4.8
Liberal	Paul Varley	4,750	22.5	−16.7
One Nation	Wayne Whitney	3,632	17.2	+17.2
Greens	Mike Stasse	734	3.5	+3.5
Reform	Keith Lane	172	0.8	+0.8
Total formal votes		21,076	98.6	+1.1
Informal votes		294	1.4	−1.1
Turnout		21,370	94.4	+1.4
Two-party-preferred result
Labor	Neil Roberts	13,289	67.4	+6.7
Liberal	Paul Varley	6,421	32.6	−6.7
Labor hold		Swing	+6.7	

1995 Queensland state election: Nudgee
Party	Candidate	Votes	%	±%
Labor	Neil Roberts	12,409	60.7	−8.0
Liberal	Daniel Taylor	8,022	39.3	+8.0
Total formal votes		20,431	97.5	+0.6
Informal votes		524	2.5	−0.6
Turnout		20,955	93.0	
Labor hold		Swing	−8.0	

1992 Queensland state election: Nudgee
Party	Candidate	Votes	%	±%
Labor	Ken Vaughan	14,359	68.7	+3.2
Liberal	Max Shadlow	6,539	31.3	+7.3
Total formal votes		20,898	96.9	
Informal votes		673	3.1	
Turnout		21,571	93.4	
Labor hold		Swing	+2.5	

=== Elections in the 1980s ===
1989 Queensland state election: Nudgee
Party	Candidate	Votes	%	±%
Labor	Ken Vaughan	11,629	67.8	+9.7
Liberal	Ron Nightingale	3,593	21.0	+2.9
National	Charles Allsop	1,927	11.2	−12.6
Total formal votes		17,149	97.0	−1.0
Informal votes		349	3.0	+1.0
Turnout		17,682	92.4	+1.6
Two-party-preferred result
Labor	Ken Vaughan	11,764	68.6	+5.5
Liberal	Ron Nightingale	5,385	31.4	+31.4
Labor hold		Swing	+5.5	

1986 Queensland state election: Nudgee
Party	Candidate	Votes	%	±%
Labor	Ken Vaughan	9,849	58.1	−4.3
National	Reginald Rofe	4,041	23.8	+23.8
Liberal	Peter Hull	3,069	18.1	−19.5
Total formal votes		16,959	98.0	+0.2
Informal votes		349	2.0	−0.2
Turnout		17,308	94.0	+0.7
Two-party-preferred result
Labor	Ken Vaughan	10,701	63.1	+2.1
National	Reginald Rofe	6,258	36.9	+36.9
Labor hold		Swing	+2.1	

1983 Queensland state election: Nudgee
Party	Candidate	Votes	%	±%
Labor	Ken Vaughan	8,973	62.4	+1.5
Liberal	Peter Hull	5,398	37.6	−1.5
Total formal votes		14,371	97.7	−0.8
Informal votes		331	2.3	+0.8
Turnout		14,702	93.4	+2.7
Labor hold		Swing	+1.5	

1980 Queensland state election: Nudgee
Party	Candidate	Votes	%	±%
Labor	Ken Vaughan	8,567	60.9	+2.2
Liberal	Gerald Connor	5,503	39.1	−2.2
Total formal votes		14,070	98.5	+0.4
Informal votes		210	1.5	−0.4
Turnout		14,280	90.7	−1.9
Labor hold		Swing	+2.2	

=== Elections in the 1970s ===
1977 Queensland state election: Nudgee
Party	Candidate	Votes	%	±%
Labor	Ken Vaughan	8,483	58.7	+7.6
Liberal	Denis Simonyi	5,976	41.3	−7.6
Total formal votes		14,459	98.1	
Informal votes		278	1.9	
Turnout		14,737	92.6	
Labor hold		Swing	+7.6	

1974 Queensland state election: Nudgee
Party	Candidate	Votes	%	±%
Labor	Jack Melloy	7,399	54.1	−10.2
Liberal	Denis Simonyi	6,286	45.9	+19.2
Total formal votes		13,685	98.5	+0.3
Informal votes		208	1.5	−0.3
Turnout		13,893	91.2	−3.2
Labor hold		Swing	−11.3	

1972 Queensland state election: Nudgee
Party	Candidate	Votes	%	±%
Labor	Jack Melloy	7,908	64.3	+2.7
Liberal	Alan Camp	3,288	26.7	−0.8
Queensland Labor	Gordon Blain	1,100	9.0	+0.4
Total formal votes		12,296	98.2	
Informal votes		221	1.8	
Turnout		12,517	94.4	
Two-party-preferred result
Labor	Jack Melloy	8,042	65.4	+1.7
Liberal	Alan Camp	4,254	34.6	−1.7
Labor hold		Swing	+1.7	

=== Elections in the 1960s ===
1969 Queensland state election: Nudgee
Party	Candidate	Votes	%	±%
Labor	Jack Melloy	8,771	61.6	−1.7
Liberal	Robert Harper	3,914	27.5	−7.2
Queensland Labor	David Mapstone	1,228	8.6	+8.6
Social Credit	Hubert Giesberts	335	2.3	+2.3
Total formal votes		14,248	98.1	−0.2
Informal votes		268	1.9	+0.2
Turnout		14,516	95.2	+0.3
Two-party-preferred result
Labor	Jack Melloy	9,111	63.9	−1.0
Liberal	Robert Harper	5,137	36.1	+1.0
Labor hold		Swing	−1.0	

1966 Queensland state election: Nudgee
Party	Candidate	Votes	%	±%
Labor	Jack Melloy	8,547	63.3	+2.9
Liberal	Kenneth Nugent	4,685	34.7	+3.4
Communist	William Hill	270	2.0	+2.0
Total formal votes		13,502	98.3	+0.3
Informal votes		226	1.7	−0.3
Turnout		13,728	94.9	−0.6
Two-party-preferred result
Labor	Jack Melloy	8,763	64.9	+2.9
Liberal	Kenneth Nugent	4,739	35.1	−2.9
Labor hold		Swing	+2.9	

1963 Queensland state election: Nudgee
Party	Candidate	Votes	%	±%
Labor	Jack Melloy	7,563	60.4	+6.7
Liberal	Dennis Hedges	3,919	31.3	−2.0
Queensland Labor	Mick O'Connor	1,033	8.3	−3.8
Total formal votes		12,515	98.0	−0.7
Informal votes		261	2.0	+0.7
Turnout		12,776	95.5	+1.6
Two-party-preferred result
Labor	Jack Melloy	7,755	62.0	
Liberal	Dennis Hedges	4,760	38.0	
Labor hold		Swing	N/A	

1960 Queensland state election: Nudgee
Party	Candidate	Votes	%	±%
Labor	Jack Melloy	6,325	53.7	
Liberal	William Banks	3,926	33.3	
Queensland Labor	Walter Barnes	1,423	12.1	
Communist	William Hill	105	0.9	
Total formal votes		11,779	98.7	
Informal votes		151	1.3	
Turnout		11,930	93.9	
Labor win		(new seat)		
