= 1931 Brisbane City Council election =

Australian local council election

1931 Brisbane City Council elections
- 2 May 1931

20 seats on the Brisbane City Council
	First party	Second party	Third party
Party	Labor	Civic Reform	Non-Party Progressives
Last election	5 wards	0 wards	0 wards
Seats won	8 wards	7 wards	3 wards
Seat change	▲3	▲7	▲3
	Fourth party	Fifth party
Party	National Civic	Nationalist Citizens
Last election	16 wards	0 wards
Seats won	1 ward	1 ward
Seat change	▼15	▲1
Lord Mayor of Brisbane before election
Archibald Watson
National Citizens
Subsequent Lord Mayor
John William Greene
Progressives

The 1931 Brisbane City Council election was held on 2 May 1931 to elect councillors for each of the 20 wards of the City of Brisbane. The election resulted in 8 seats for Labor, 7 seats for Civic Reform, 3 seats for non-party progressives and 2 seats for National Citizens. The new council elected John William Greene as Lord Mayor.

== Results ==
=== Summary ===
Ward	Party	Alderman
Brisbane	Civic Reform	Alfred Faulkner
Bulimba	Labor	William McAuliffe
Coorparoo	Labor	John Innes Brown
Enoggera	Nationalist Civic	Ernest Lanham
Hamilton	Civic Reform	Archibald Houston Tait
Ithaca	Labor	William Robert Warmington
Kelvin Grove	Labor	Peter Gaffney
Kurilpa	Labor	Joseph Moore
Logan	Nationalist Citizens	Robert Nixon-Smith
Maree	Labor	Alexander Skirving
Oxley	Progressives	John Edward Lane
Paddington	Labor	William Power
South Brisbane	Labor	Arthur Laurie
Sandgate	Progressives	Eric Decker
Stephens	Civic Reform	Robert Paine
Toombul	Civic Reform	Thomas Gregory Payne
Toowong	Civic Reform	Harry Massey
Valley	Civic Reform	Malcolm Peter Morrison Campbell
Windsor	Civic Reform	George Boardman Vickers
Wynnum	Progressives	John William Greene

=== Coorparoo ===
1931 Brisbane City Council election: Coorparoo Ward (Note: These were the last results published. The report noted that the "[f]ew outstanding results cannot affect results".)
Party	Candidate	Votes	%	±%
Labor	John Brown	1,425	51.91	
Civic Reform	John Lackey	1,320	48.09	
Total formal votes		2,745	98.89	
Informal votes		31	1.12	
Turnout		2,776	77.67	
Labor win		(new ward)		

=== Enoggera ===
1931 Brisbane City Council election: Enoggera Ward
Party	Candidate	Votes	%	±%
Labor	James McGuire	899	34.44	
Nationalist Civic	Ernest Lanham	755	28.93	
Civic Reform	Stanley Chapman	737	28.24	
Ind. Progressive	Cecil Snartt	219	8.39	
Total formal votes		2,610	97.79	
Informal votes		59	2.21	
Turnout		2,669	74.24	
Two-party-preferred result
Nationalist Civic	Ernest Lanham	1,407	53.91	
Labor	James McGuire	1,203	46.09	
Nationalist Civic hold		Swing		

=== Hamilton ===
1931 Brisbane City Council election: Hamilton Ward
Party	Candidate	Votes	%	±%
Civic Reform	Archibald Tait	2,052	58.76	
National Citizens	Charles Campbell	957	27.41	
Non-party Progressive	Stanley Carrick	503	14.40	
Total formal votes		3,492	97.22	
Informal votes		100	2.78	
Turnout		3,592	85.32	
Civic Reform win		(new ward)		

=== Paddington ===
1931 Brisbane City Council election: Paddington Ward
Party	Candidate	Votes	%	±%
Labor	Bill Power	1,999	56.56	
Civic Reform	Benjamin Harding	1,056	29.88	
Non-party Progressive	James Leavy	241	6.82	
Independent Citizens'	Elizabeth Goldsmith	238	6.73	
Total formal votes		3,534	91.34	
Informal votes		335	8.66	
Turnout		3,869	91.31	
Labor hold		Swing		
