= 1934 Brisbane City Council election =

Australian local council election

1934 Brisbane City Council elections
- 28 April 1934

All 19 seats on Brisbane City Council 10 seats needed for a majority
- Lord Mayor
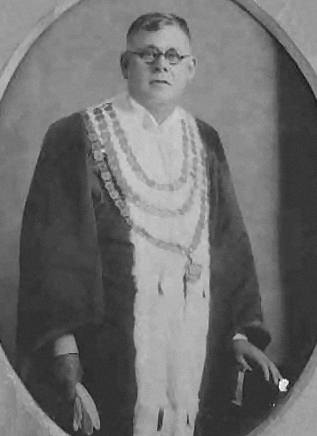

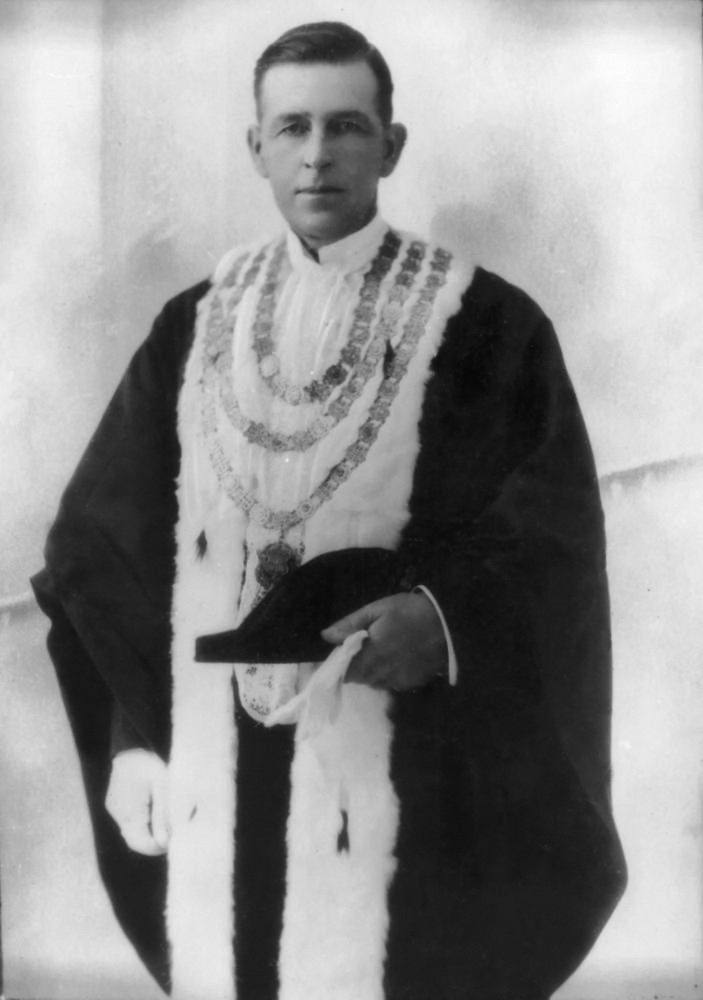

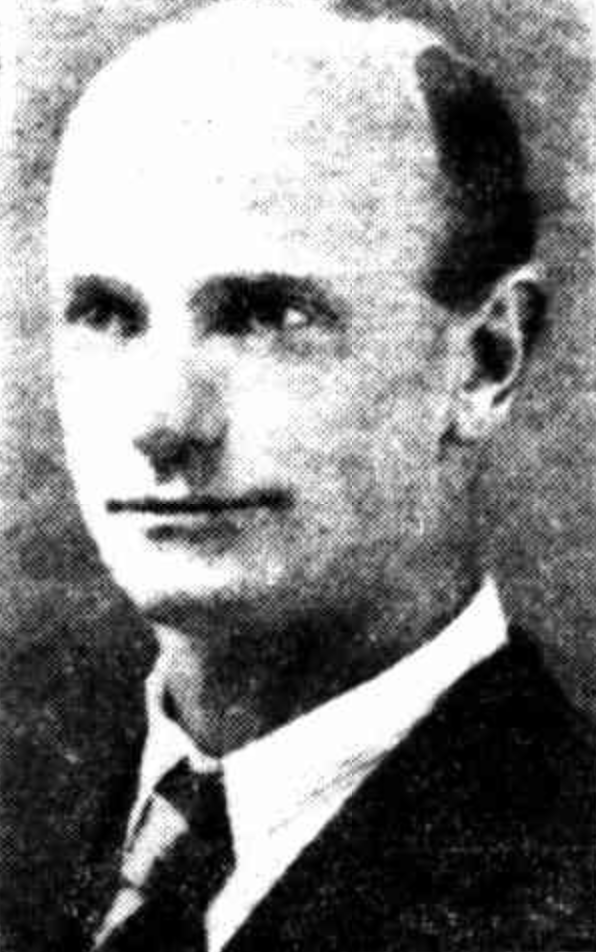
	First party	Second party	Third party
Candidate	Alfred James Jones	John William Greene	Fred Paterson
Party	Labor	National Citizens'	Communist
Primary vote	79,367	76,524	8,262
Percentage	48.35%	46.62%	5.03%
Lord Mayor before election
John William Greene
Independent Progressive
Subsequent Lord Mayor
Alfred James Jones
Labor
- Aldermen
Party	Leader	Vote %	Seats	+/–
Labor	Alfred James Jones		12	+5
National Citizens'	John William Greene		5	−7
This lists parties that won seats. See the complete results below.

The 1934 Brisbane City Council election was held on 28 April 1934 to elect the Lord Mayor and councillors for each of the 20 wards of the City of Brisbane, a local government areas (LGA) of Queensland, Australia.

The election was held separate to all other LGAs in Queensland, which had held elections a year prior in April 1933.

== Results ==
=== Lord Mayor ===
1934 Brisbane mayoral election
Party	Candidate	Votes	%	±%
Labor	William Jolly	79,367	48.35	
National Citizens'	John William Greene	76,524	46.62	
Communist	Fred Paterson	8,262	5.03	
Total formal votes		164,153		
Informal votes				
Turnout				
Labor win		(new seat)		

=== Wards ===
Ward	Party	Alderman
Brisbane	Labor	J. A. Moir
Bulimba	Labor	William McAuliffe
Buranda	Labor	A. Laurie
Enoggera	National Citizens'	Ernest Lanham
Fortitude Valley	Labor	E. F. O'Brien
Hamilton	National Citizens'	Archibald Houston Tait
Ithaca	Labor	William Robert Warmington
Kelvin Grove	Labor	W. J. Graham
Kurilpa	Labor	Joseph Moore
Logan	Labor	John Innes Brown
Maree	Labor	Alexander Skirving
Merthyr	Labor	H. C. H. Taaffe
Nundah	Labor	A. E. J. Austin
Oxley	National Citizens'	John Edward Lane
Paddington	Labor	William Power
Sandgate	National Citizens'	Eric Decker
South Brisbane	Labor	W. V. Hefferan
Toowong	Independent	Harry Massey
Windsor	Labor	H. Williams
Wynnum	National Citizens'	William Logan Dart
