= Coorparoo Ward =

Brisbane City Council ward

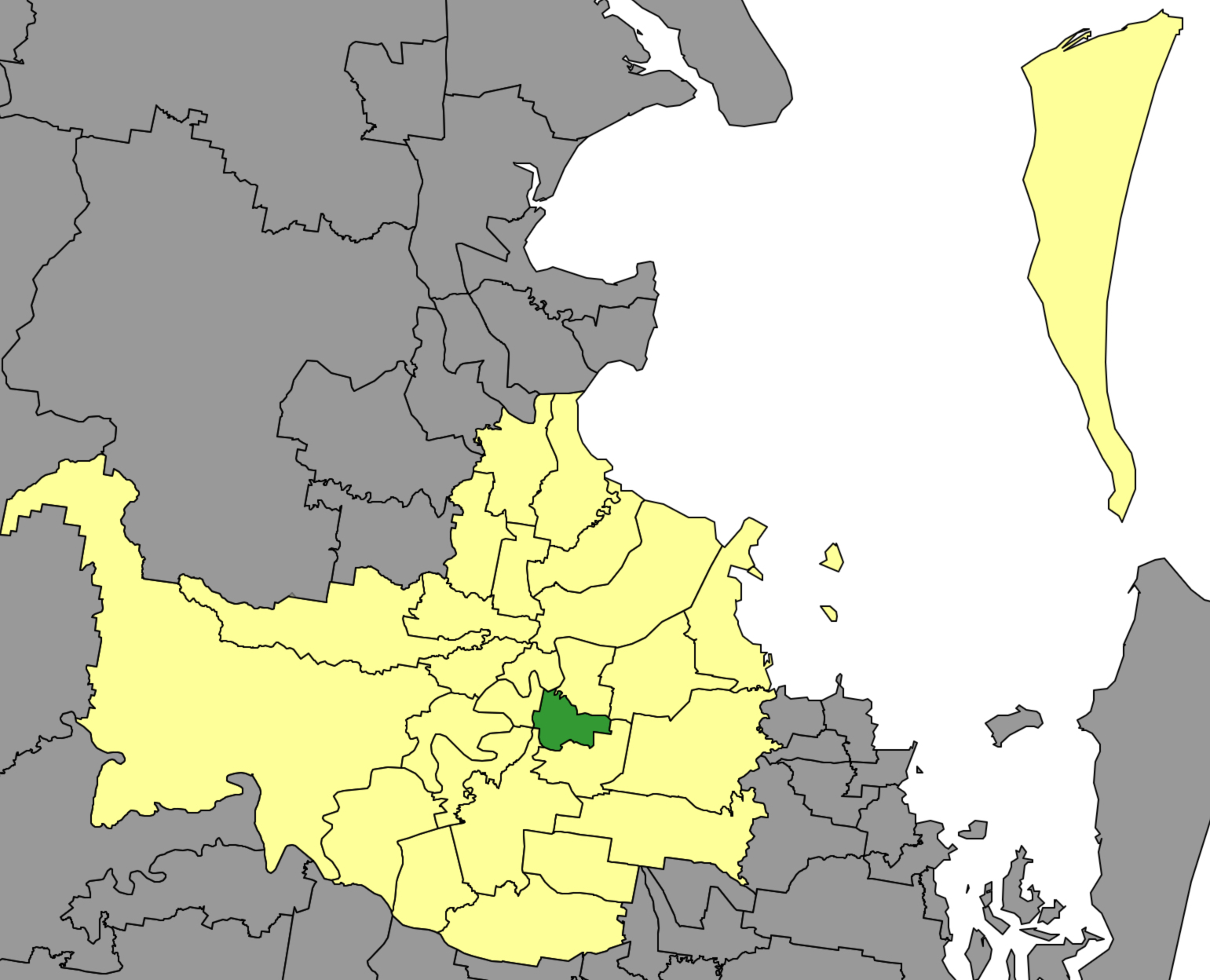
- Dates current: 1931–1934; 1952–1961; 2016–present
- Councillor: Fiona Cunningham
- Party: Liberal National Party
- Namesake: Coorparoo
- Electors: 33,207 (2024)
- Demographic: Inner metropolitan

The Coorparoo Ward is a Brisbane City Council ward covering Coorparoo, Carina Heights, Greenslopes and parts of East Brisbane, Annerley and Camp Hill.

Parts of East Brisbane were added in boundary changes prior to the 2020 LGA elections.

== History ==
=== First incarnation ===
The original Coorparoo Ward was established for the 1931 Brisbane City Council election, seemingly largely replacing the former Buranda Ward. This change was made despite the ward boundaries being based on those of the state electoral districts; with the Electoral district of Buranda still having existed at this time.

The ward was won for the Labor Party by John Innes Brown at the 1931 election. Brown had served as alderman of the adjacent Bulimba Ward since the previous election.

The ward was abolished ahead of the 1934 Brisbane City Council election; the re-established Buranda Ward largely succeeding the ward. Incumbent Alderman Brown chose to instead contest the nearby Logan Ward; representing the ward for a partial term until 1936.

=== Second incarnation ===
The 1950 Queensland state election saw the number of districts increase from 62 to 75, which led to the abolishment of both the districts of Logan and Maree abolished. Parts of the two districts formed the new Electoral district of Coorparoo.

As wards in Brisbane were based on the state district boundaries, this led to the abolishment of the Logan and Maree wards, and the creation of the second Coorparoo Ward, at the 1952 Brisbane City Council election (the first council election following the state election).

The ward was won for the C.M.O. by Horace Williams at the 1952 election. Williams had served as alderman for the abolished Logan Ward since at least the 1940 Brisbane City Council election. Williams retained the ward for the C.M.O. at the 1955 election, but passed away in office in July of that year.

A by-election was held to fill the vacancy caused by Williams' death on 3 September 1955. Arthur Russell Penfold retained the ward for the C.M.O. at the election. Penfold again retained the ward at the 1958 election, and represented the ward until its abolishment at the 1961 election. The abolishment came as a result of the state district of Coorparoo being abolished at the 1960 Queensland state election.

=== Third incarnation ===
The third and current incarnation of the ward was established for the 2016 election. The ward took more than half of the area previously within Holland Park Ward, which shifted considerably south due to the abolishment of Wishart Ward.

The new ward was won by Ian McKenzie for the LNP; having previously represented Holland Park Ward since the 2008 election. McKenzie represented the ward until 10 May 2019, when he resigned to allow for the appointment of his successor ahead of the 2020 election.

Fiona Cunningham was appointed to the casual vacancy left by McKenzie's resignation on 14 May 2019. Cunningham retained the ward for the LNP at the 2020 and 2024 elections.

== Councillors for Coorparoo Ward ==
=== First incarnation ===
| Image | Alderman | Party | Term | Notes |
|---|---|---|---|---|
| | John Brown | Labor | 2 May 1931 – 28 April 1934 | Previously represented Bulimba Ward since 1928 election. Ward abolished; successfully contested Logan Ward at 1934 election. |

=== Second incarnation ===
| Image | Alderman | Party | Term | Notes |
|---|---|---|---|---|
| | Horace Williams | Citizens | 31 May 1952 – 9 July 1955 | Previously represented Logan Ward since 1940 election. Died in office. |
| | Arthur Russell Penfold | Citizens | 3 September 1955 – 29 April 1961 | Elected at by-election. Ward abolished. |

=== Third incarnation ===
| Image | Councillor | Party | Term | Notes |
|---|---|---|---|---|
| | Ian McKenzie | Liberal National | 19 March 2016 – 10 May 2019 | Resigned. |
| | Fiona Cunningham | Liberal National | 14 May 2019 – present | Appointed to fill casual vacancy. Incumbent |

== Results ==
=== 2024 ===
2024 Queensland local elections: Coorparoo Ward
| Party | Candidate | Votes | % | ±% |
|---|---|---|---|---|
| Liberal National | Fiona Cunningham | 12,226 | 44.87 | 0.0 |
| Greens | Kath Angus | 9,500 | 34.86 | +7.24 |
| Labor | Alicia Weiderman | 5,523 | 20.27 | −7.24 |
| Total formal votes | | 27,249 | 98.4 | |
| Informal votes | | 435 | 1.6 | |
| Turnout | | 27,684 | 83.37 | +6.07 |
Two-party-preferred result
| Liberal National | Fiona Cunningham | 13,132 | 52.3 | −3.37 |
| Greens | Kath Angus | 11,976 | 47.7 | +3.37 |
| Liberal National hold | | Swing | −3.37 | |

=== 2020 ===
2020 Queensland local elections: Coorparoo Ward
| Party | Candidate | Votes | % | ±% |
|---|---|---|---|---|
| Liberal National | Fiona Cunningham | 10,575 | 44.87 | −1.63 |
| Greens | Sally Dillon | 6,509 | 27.62 | +9.82 |
| Labor | Matt Campbell | 6,484 | 27.51 | −5.61 |
| Total formal votes | | 23,568 | 98.0 | +0.7 |
| Informal votes | | 476 | 2.0 | −0.7 |
| Turnout | | 24,044 | 77.3 | |
Two-party-preferred result
| Liberal National | Fiona Cunningham | 11,338 | 55.67 | +2.57 |
| Greens | Sally Dillon | 9,030 | 44.33 | +44.33 |
| Liberal National hold | | Swing | +2.57 | |

=== 2016 ===
2016 Queensland local elections: Coorparoo Ward
| Party | Candidate | Votes | % | ±% |
|---|---|---|---|---|
| Liberal National | Ian McKenzie | 10,774 | 46.6 | −9.2 |
| Labor | Matt Campbell | 8,157 | 35.3 | +4.1 |
| Greens | David Hale | 3,567 | 15.4 | +4.3 |
| People Decide | Grigory Graborenko | 639 | 2.8 | +2.8 |
| Total formal votes | | 20,515 | - | − |
| Informal votes | | 662 | - | − |
| Turnout | | 23,137 | - | − |
Two-party-preferred result
| Liberal National | Ian McKenzie | 11,117 | 53.0 | −9.2 |
| Labor | Matt Campbell | 9,875 | 47.0 | +9.2 |
| Liberal National hold | | Swing | −9.2 | |

=== 1931 ===
1931 Brisbane City Council election: Coorparoo Ward (Note: These were the last results published. The report noted that the "[f]ew outstanding results cannot affect results".)
| Party | Candidate | Votes | % | ±% |
|---|---|---|---|---|
| Labor | John Brown | 1,425 | 51.91 | |
| Civic Reform | John Lackey | 1,320 | 48.09 | |
| Total formal votes | | 2,745 | 98.89 | |
| Informal votes | | 31 | 1.12 | |
| Turnout | | 2,776 | 77.67 | |
| Labor win | | (new ward) | | |
