= 1928 Brisbane City Council election =

Australian local council election

1928 Brisbane City Council elections
- 18 February 1928

20 seats on the Brisbane City Council
- Lord Mayor
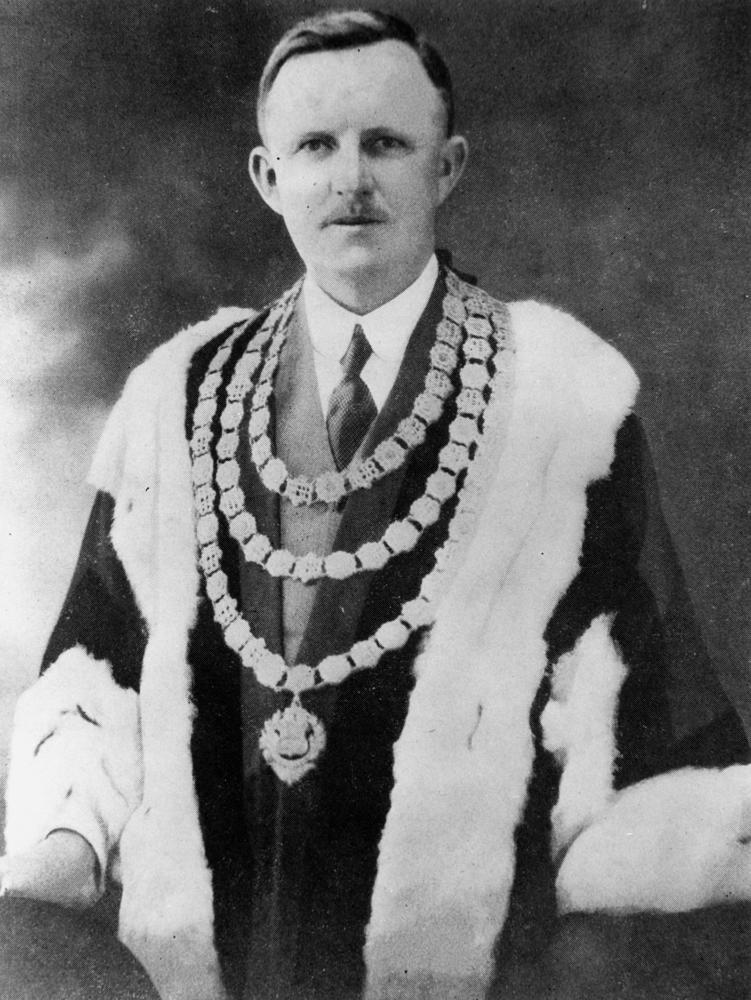

	First party	Second party
Candidate	William Jolly	Ernest Edward Quinlan
Party	Nationalist Civic	Labor
Popular vote	73,919	47,101
Percentage	61.08%	38.92%
Swing	▲2.39 pp	▼2.39 pp
Lord Mayor before election
William Jolly
Nationalist Civic Party
Lord Mayor after election
William Jolly
Nationalist Civic Party
- Aldermen
- All 20 wards on the City Council; 11 wards (or 10 wards & mayoralty) needed for a majority
Party	Leader	Vote %	Seats	+/–
Nationalist Civic	William Jolly	52.67	12	−2
Labor	Ernest Edward Quinlan	42.15	6	0
Independent	N/A	5.19	2	+2
This lists parties that won seats. See the complete results below.

The 1928 Brisbane City Council election was held on 18 February 1928 to elect the Lord Mayor and councillors for each of the 20 wards of the City of Brisbane.

== Results ==
The ruling United Party changed its name to Nationalist Civic Party during the preceding term.

These results do not include postal and absent votes, but are otherwise complete except where stated.

=== Lord Mayor ===
1928 Brisbane mayoral election
Party	Candidate	Votes	%	±%
Nationalist Civic	William Jolly	73.919	61.08	+2.39
Labor	Ernest Edward Quinlan	47,101	38.92	−2.39
Total formal votes		121,020		
Informal votes				
Turnout				
Nationalist Civic hold		Swing	+2.39	

=== Wards ===
==== Summary ====
Ward	Party	Councillor
Brisbane	Labor	William Thomas King
Bulimba	Labor	John Innes Brown
Buranda	Labor	A. Laurie
Enoggera	Nationalist Civic	Ernest Lanham
Fortitude Valley	Labor	J. P. Keogh
Ithaca	Nationalist Civic	Wm. Robert Warmington
Kelvin Grove	Labor	J. Tait
Kurilpa	Nationalist Civic	Ernest Barstow
Logan	Nationalist Civic	J. Soden
Maree	Nationalist Civic	Lewis Wills Luckins
Merthyr	Nationalist Civic	A. M. Oxlade
Nundah	Independent Nationalist	Frederick William Bradbury
Oxley	Nationalist Civic	Frederick Arthur Stimpson
Paddington	Labor	John Fihelly
Sandgate	Independent Nationalist	William Frederick Schulz
South Brisbane	Nationalist Civic	Robert William Henry Long
Toombul	Nationalist Civic	C. W. Campbell
Toowong	Nationalist Civic	Archibald Watson
Windsor	Nationalist Civic	Thomas Prentice
Wynnum	Nationalist Civic	William Logan Dart

==== Paddington ====
1928 Brisbane City Council election: Paddington Ward
Party	Candidate	Votes	%	±%
Labor	John Arthur Fihelly	2,321	59.12	−1.82%
Nationalist Civic	Windham Harold Wilson	1,605	40.88	+1.82%
Total formal votes		3,926		
Informal votes				
Turnout				
Labor hold		Swing	−1.82%	
