= 1935 Queensland state election =

- 11 May 1935

All 62 seats in the Legislative Assembly of Queensland 32 Assembly seats were needed for a majority
- Registered: 507,760 ▲3.2%
- Turnout: 470,691 (92.70%) (▼0.12 pp)
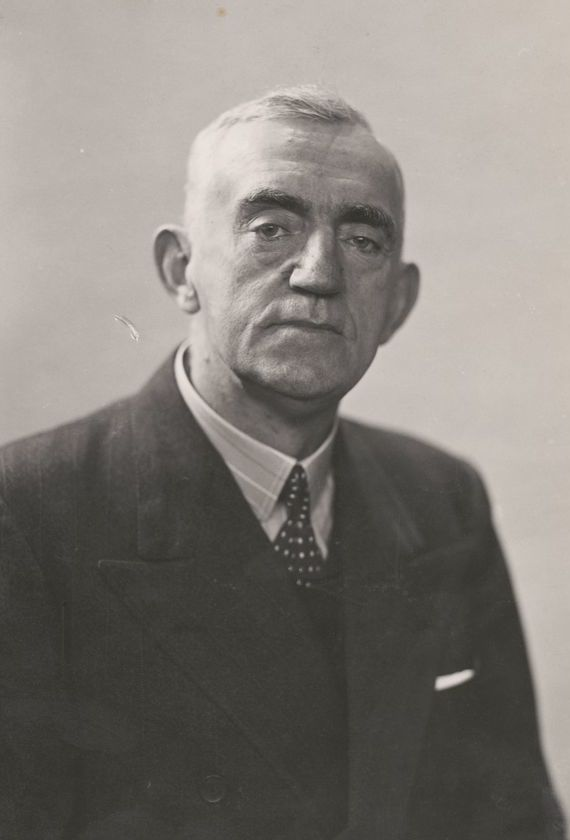

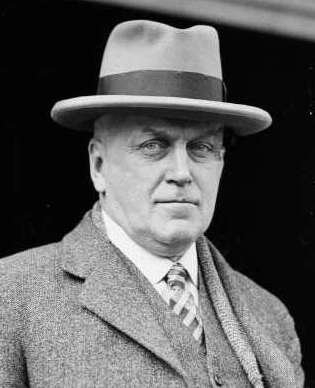
	First party	Second party
Leader	William Forgan Smith	Arthur Edward Moore
Party	Labor	CPNP
Leader since	27 May 1929	19 April 1924
Leader's seat	Mackay	Aubigny
Last election	33 seats, 49.89%	28 seats, 45.21%
Seats won	46	16
Seat change	▲13	▼12
Popular vote	247,135	156,325
Percentage	53.43%	33.80%
Swing	▲3.54 pp	▼11.41 pp
Premier before election
William Forgan Smith
Labor
Elected Premier
William Forgan Smith
Labor

Elections were held in the Australian state of Queensland on 11 May 1935 to elect the 62 members of the state's Legislative Assembly. The Labor government of Premier William Forgan Smith was seeking a second term after having defeated the Country and Progressive National Party in the 1932 election.

Labor received a significant swing and gained 13 seats. The election took place on new boundaries for the second election in a row.

== Key dates ==
Date	Event
20 March 1935	The new electoral boundaries were proclaimed.
9 April 1935	The Parliament was dissolved.
10 April 1935	Writs were issued by the Governor to proceed with an election.
17 April 1935	Close of nominations.
11 May 1935	Polling day, between the hours of 8am and 6pm.
21 May 1935	The Forgan Smith Ministry was re-sworn in.
8 June 1935	The writ was returned and the results formally declared.
26 August 1935	Parliament resumed for business.

== Results ==
Legislative Assembly (IRV) – Turnout: 92.70% (CV)
Party	Primary vote			Seats	
Party	Votes	%	Swing (pp)	Seats	Change
Labor	247,135	53.43	+3.55	46	▲13
Country and Progressive National	156,325	33.80	−11.41	16	▼12
Social Credit	32,447	7.02	+7.02	0	Steady
Communist	6,101	1.32	+1.09	0	Steady
Women's Political Association	2,898	0.68	+0.68	0	Steady
Independent Labor	1,918	0.42	+0.01	0	Steady
Independents	15,681	3.39	+0.94	0	▼1
Total	462,505	100.00		62	Steady
Invalid/blank votes	8,186	1.74	–0.61	–	–
Turnout	470,691	92.70	–0.12	–	–
Registered voters	507,760	–	–	–	–

Popular vote
Labor	53.43%
CPNP	33.80%
Social Credit	7.02%
Communist	1.32%
WPA	0.68%
Ind. Labor	0.42%
Independents	3.39%

Seats
Labor	74.19%
CPNP	25.81%

== Seats changing party representation ==
This table lists changes in party representation at the 1935 election.

Seat	Incumbent member	Party	New member	Party
Baroona	New seat		Bill Power	Labor
Carnarvon	Edward Costello	CPNP	Paul Hilton	Labor
Cook	James Kenny	CPNP	Harold Collins	Labor
East Toowoomba	James Annand	CPNP	James Kane	Labor
Fassifern	Arnold Wienholt	Independent	Alf Muller	CPNP
Fitzroy	Jens Peterson	CPNP	Jim Clark	Labor
Gympie	Vivian Tozer	CPNP	Thomas Dunstan	Labor
Kennedy	Arthur Fadden	CPNP	Cecil Jesson	Labor
Logan	Reginald King	CPNP	John Brown	Labor
Mirani	Edward Swayne	CPNP	Ted Walsh	Labor
Murilla	Godfrey Morgan	CPNP	Seat abolished	
Sandgate	Hubert Sizer	CPNP	Roland Hislop	Labor
Warwick	George Barnes	CPNP	John Healy	Labor
Windsor	Charles Taylor	CPNP	Herbert Williams	Labor
Wynnum	James Bayley	CPNP	John Donnelly	Labor

- Members listed in italics did not recontest their seats.
- The CPNP sitting member for Cook, James Kenny instead contested the seat of Sandgate and lost.
- The CPNP sitting member for Kennedy, Arthur Fadden instead contested the seat of Mirani and lost.
- The CPNP sitting member for the abolished district of Murilla, Godfrey Morgan contested the seat of Dalby and won.

== See also ==
- Members of the Queensland Legislative Assembly, 1932–1935
- Members of the Queensland Legislative Assembly, 1935–1938
- Candidates of the Queensland state election, 1935
- Forgan Smith Ministry
