= Vicky Darling =

Australian politician (born 1966)

Minister for Environment of Queensland
- In office 22 June 2011 – 26 March 2012
- Premier: Anna Bligh
- Preceded by: Kate Jones
- Succeeded by: Andrew Powell

Member of the Queensland Parliament for Sandgate
- In office 9 September 2006 – 24 March 2012
- Preceded by: Gordon Nuttall
- Succeeded by: Kerry Millard

Personal details
- Born: Vicky Elizabeth Darling; 29 November 1966 (age 59) Brisbane, Queensland, Australia
- Party: Labor
- Spouse: John McDermott
- Relations: Elaine Darling (mother), Jack Melloy (grandfather)
- Education: Griffith University
- Occupation: Public servant, Travel agent, Lecturer

Vicky Elizabeth Darling (born 29 November 1966) is an Australian Labor politician elected to the Queensland Legislative Assembly in September 2006 as the member for Sandgate.

Darling was preselected by the Labor Party in 2006 She replaced controversial Labor MP Gordon Nuttall who was jailed in July 2009 for corruptly receiving secret commissions.

She was appointed as Minister for the Environment, Resource Management and Climate Change on 22 June 2011, after Kate Jones resigned from cabinet to defend her seat of Ashgrove against Liberal National Party (LNP) leader Campbell Newman. Darling lost her seat in the LNP landslide at the 2012 state election.

Her mother, Elaine Darling, the first female member of the Australian House of Representatives from Queensland, was a Labor MP for Lilley from 1980 until 1993. Her grandfather, Jack Melloy, was a Labor Queensland state MP for Nudgee from 1960 to 1977.

Darling is currently the CEO of Volunteering & Contact ACT.

== See also ==
- Members of the Queensland Legislative Assembly, 2006–2009
- Members of the Queensland Legislative Assembly, 2009–2012

Political offices
Preceded by Kate Jones	Minister for Environment; 2011–2012	Succeeded by Andrew Powell
Parliament of Queensland
Preceded by Gordon Nuttall	Member for Sandgate; 2006–2012	Succeeded by Kerry Millard
