= Jack Melloy =

Australian politician (1908–2006)

Deputy Leader of the Opposition in Queensland Deputy Leader of the Labor Party in Queensland
- In office 19 December 1974 – November 1976
- Leader: Tom Burns
- Preceded by: Fred Newton
- Succeeded by: Jack Houston

Member of the Queensland Legislative Assembly for Nudgee
- In office 28 May 1960 – 12 November 1977
- Preceded by: New seat
- Succeeded by: Ken Vaughan

Personal details
- Born: John Melloy; 10 November 1908 Brisbane, Queensland, Australia
- Died: 6 January 2006 (aged 97) Redcliffe, Queensland, Australia
- Party: Labor
- Spouse(s): Elizabeth Maude Garner (b.1910 Charters Towers, m.1933)
- Relations: Numerous, including Vicky Darling
- Children: John Douglas, Elaine Elizabeth (Elaine Darling), Lynette Anne, Carol Netta, Noela Meryl, Geoffrey Francis, Christine Louise
- Occupation: Dental technician, Air Cargo Officer, Bookie's Clerk, Trade union organiser

John (Jack) Melloy (10 November 1908 – 6 January 2006) was a member of the Legislative Assembly of Queensland for the Australian Labor Party.

== Personal life ==
Jack Melloy was born in Brisbane, the youngest of six children of Charles Frederick Melloy and Ada Louise Crampton. Unlike his older siblings, Jack (formally John) had no middle name, which irritated him, so he sometimes called himself John Joseph Patrick Melloy.

Jack grew up in a rented house at Kangaroo Point on the banks of the Brisbane River. His father, having sailed the seven seas (or at least one or two them) after leaving his family home in Liverpool, England at the age of 14, worked on boats sailing up and down the river. Jack was a Naval Cadet at an early age, but led the life of a landlubber in later times.

He married Elizabeth Maude Garner (b. 1910 in Charters Towers, Queensland) on 24 June 1933. They had seven children: John Douglas, Elaine Elizabeth (Elaine), Lynette Anne, Carol Netta, Noela Meryl, Geoffrey Francis, and Christine Louise.

Jack Melloy died at Redcliffe (north of Brisbane) in 2006, aged 97. His wife Elizabeth had died in 1995. The couple were survived by their 7 children, 18 grandchildren and numerous great-grandchildren.

== Business life ==
Jack Melloy was a dental technician. He was president and secretary of the Dental Technicians Association of Queensland. He served as the union representative on various dental committees. During World War II, he was a Staff Sergeant for the Australian Army Dental Corps from 1942 to 1946.

From 1951 to 1952 he was organizer and industrial advocate for the Federated Miscellaneous Workers' Union. Prior to his election to parliament in 1960, he was working as an Air Cargo Officer at the Brisbane Airport. He had also done some part-time work as a Bookie's Clerk at the main Brisbane race venues (no doubt to help feed his 7 hungry children - all of them voracious eaters.)

== Politics ==
Jack Melloy joined the Labor Party in 1922 at the age of 14. His interest in socialist politics was influenced by his mother's trade unionist cousin Walter Russell Crampton, who famously did himself out of a job by voting in favour of the abolition the Queensland Legislative Council (the upper house of parliament), of which he was a member.

Jack Melloy first ran for public office in 1949 as a Labor candidate for Buranda in Brisbane City Council elections but was unsuccessful.

He stood for the federal electorate of Lilley in 1955 and 1958 but was unsuccessful both times.

In 1960 he was the Labor candidate in the Queensland electorate of Nudgee (defeating Frank Sleeman, who was later Brisbane's Lord Mayor) and was elected to the Legislative Assembly of Queensland. He remained as Member for Nudgee until his retirement in 1977.

He was Shadow Minister for Health from 1967 to 1972, where his background as a dental technician made him passionate about the state's lack of dental services and the poor health system generally. He also served as shadow minister for Health, Police, and Aboriginal Affairs, for some time starting round about 1975.

In 1974 Melloy was elected deputy leader of the State Labor Party, defeating Keith Wright and Jack Houston. He remained deputy leader until 1976.

He championed the safari suit (a short-sleeved jacket worn without a shirt designed for wear in warm climates) by wearing one in Parliament but was told to leave and jokingly derided as a bagman and a hippy.

He retired in 1977, but continued his political activities through assisting his politically active family in their campaigns. In 1980 his daughter Elaine Darling won the seat of Lilley (the one he had unsuccessfully contested twice in the 1950s). His granddaughter Vicky Darling won the state seat of Sandgate in 2006. Some other family members served in executive positions of branches of the Labor Party. In 1989 his daughter Noela Pemberton was the Labor candidate in the State electorate of Aspley being defeated by about 400 votes, after outpolling a sitting National Party State Government Minister and a Liberal Party Local Government Councillor on the primary vote. The Local Government councillor won the seat after the distribution of preferences.

In 2000 his daughters Elaine Darling and Lyn Kally became local government Councillors in Queensland - Elaine in Caloundra, and Lyn in Esk Shire.

Jack Melloy was awarded life membership of the Australian Labor Party in 1984.

At age 95, he was still handing out how-to-vote cards on election day, loyal to his party. He served his party for over 80 years.

Parliament of Queensland
New seat	Member for Nudgee; 1960–1977	Succeeded by Ken Vaughan
