= Nev Warburton =

Australian politician

The Honourable Neville Warburton

Minister for Police and Emergency Services
- In office 16 December 1991 – 24 September 1992
- Premier: Wayne Goss
- Preceded by: Terry Mackenroth
- Succeeded by: Paul Braddy

Minister for Employment, Training and Industrial Relations
- In office 7 December 1989 – 16 December 1991
- Premier: Wayne Goss
- Preceded by: Vince Lester
- Succeeded by: Ken Vaughan

Leader of the Opposition in Queensland
- In office 29 August 1984 – 2 March 1988
- Deputy: Tom Burns
- Preceded by: Keith Wright
- Succeeded by: Wayne Goss

Leader of the Labor Party in Queensland
- In office 29 August 1984 – 2 March 1988
- Deputy: Tom Burns
- Preceded by: Keith Wright
- Succeeded by: Wayne Goss

Deputy Leader of the Opposition in Queensland
- In office 20 October 1982 – 29 August 1984
- Leader: Keith Wright
- Preceded by: Bill D'Arcy
- Succeeded by: Tom Burns

Deputy Leader of the Labor Party in Queensland
- In office 20 October 1982 – 29 August 1984
- Leader: Keith Wright
- Preceded by: Bill D'Arcy
- Succeeded by: Tom Burns

Member of the Queensland Legislative Assembly for Sandgate
- In office 12 November 1977 – 19 September 1992
- Preceded by: Harry Dean
- Succeeded by: Gordon Nuttall

Personal details
- Born: Neville George Warburton; 23 February 1932 Brisbane, Queensland, Australia
- Died: 6 August 2018 (aged 86) Maroochydore, Queensland, Australia
- Resting place: Buderim, Queensland, Australia
- Party: Labor
- Spouse: Frances Helen Doig (m. 1956)
- Children: 3
- Education: Hendra State School
- Occupation: Electrician; Unionist; Politician

Neville George Warburton (23 February 1932 – 5 August 2018) was an Australian politician from Queensland, who served as leader of the opposition from 1984 to 1988, and as a minister in the Goss Ministry from 1989 to 1992.

== Career ==
=== Early career ===
Warburton was elected at the 1977 election as the Labor Party candidate for the seat of Sandgate, succeeding Harold Dean who had held the seat for the ALP since 1960.

In 1982, following a string of poor election results under Ed Casey, a leadership contest lead to fellow opposition frontbencher Keith Wright defeating Casey in a secret ballot. Warburton was appointed deputy opposition leader in Wright's shadow cabinet, despite having served only five years in parliament.

Warburton became a member of the then dominant Trades and Labour Council faction, an affiliation he retained during his later career.

=== Leader of the Opposition ===
In 1984, Wright resigned from the Legislative Assembly to stand for election to federal parliament. Warburton was elected by caucus as the new Labor leader in Queensland on 29 August 1984. Warburton was often portrayed in the media as being an "old style" Labor leader; uncomplicated and honest. Peter Bowers, a columnist with the Sydney Morning Herald declared that Warburton was "...a straight up and down politician, no charisma, no nonsense".

Labor approached the 1986 election being given little hope of taking power, given the continued existence of the Bjelkemander, despite continued disunity and infighting between the Liberal and National parties that formed government. Warburton's policies included the introduction of random breath testing in Queensland, and a ban on uranium mining in Queensland, an idea that would become longstanding Labor party policy. Warburton also made overtures to the Liberals, offering to form a coalition government with them in order to break the National Party's grip on power. However, on polling day, the National party won a resounding victory that enabled them to govern in their own right, and Labor lost two seats, despite polling more votes than the Nationals. Warburton hung on as leader of the opposition after this defeat, but eventually handed over the party leadership to Wayne Goss in 1988.

=== Minister in the Goss Government ===
Warburton stayed on the opposition frontbench at the invitation of Goss, and when Labor won power for the first time in over thirty years at the 1989 election, he was appointed as Minister for Employment, Training and Industrial relations. In 1991, he switched portfolios and became Minister for Police and Emergency Services, a post he held until he retired from Parliament in 1992.

== Lawn bowler ==
In addition to his political career, Warburton was also an enthusiastic participant in the sport of lawn bowls.

== Death ==
Warburton died on 5 August 2018 on the Sunshine Coast. At the time of his death he was the only surviving ALP leader who did not become Premier and the last surviving Opposition Leader who had led his party during its 32 years in Opposition between 1957 and 1989.

Parliament of Queensland
Preceded by Harold Dean	Member for Sandgate; 1977–1992	Succeeded by Gordon Nuttall
Political offices
Preceded by Keith Wright	Leader of the Opposition; 1984–1988	Succeeded by Wayne Goss
