= Bisma Asif =

Australian politician

Bisma Asif MP

Member of the Legislative Assembly of Queensland for Sandgate
- Incumbent
- Assumed office 26 October 2024
- Preceded by: Stirling Hinchliffe

Personal details
- Born: 1995 or 1996 (age 30–31) Lahore, Punjab, Pakistan
- Citizenship: Australian
- Party: Labor
- Education: University of Queensland
- Profession: Politician

Bisma Asif is an Australian politician. She represents Sandgate in the Legislative Assembly of Queensland. Asif is the first Muslim to be elected to the Parliament of Queensland.

== Early life ==
Bisma Asif was born in Lahore, Punjab, Pakistan and moved to Sydney with her family in 2004.

She received a Bachelor of Economics from the University of Queensland. Asif has said that she became interested in politics and involved in the Labor Party at university, while working three jobs to support her family and pay the rent. Her first political involvement was working on a campaign for former MP Wayne Swan.

== Political career ==
Prior to seeking elected office, Asif served as the president of Young Labor and as an advisor to Anika Wells.

Asif was preselected by the Queensland Labor Party as its candidate for Sandgate at the 2024 Queensland state election to succeed the retiring incumbent Stirling Hinchliffe and was subsequently elected .

== Personal life ==
Asif is married and lives in Sandgate. She speaks Punjabi, English, Hindi and Urdu.
