= Leanne Linard =

Australian politician

The Honourable Leanne Linard MP
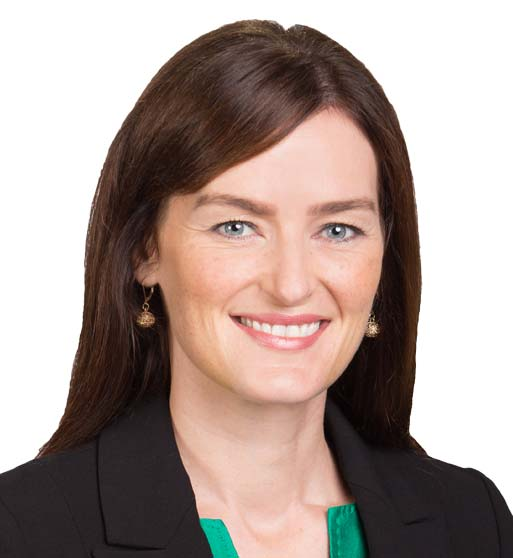

Minister for Science and Innovation
- In office 18 December 2023 – 28 October 2024
- Premier: Steven Miles
- Preceded by: Herself (as Minister for Science); Stirling Hinchliffe (as Minister for Innovation, Tourism and Sport)

Minister for Science
- In office 18 May 2023 – 18 December 2023
- Premier: Annastacia Palaszczuk; Steven Miles
- Preceded by: Meaghan Scanlon (Note: For "Science".)
- Succeeded by: Herself (as Minister for Science and Innovation)

Minister for the Environment and the Great Barrier Reef
- In office 18 May 2023 – 28 October 2024
- Premier: Annastacia Palaszczuk; Steven Miles
- Preceded by: Meaghan Scanlon

Minister for Multicultural Affairs
- In office 12 November 2020 – 18 December 2023
- Premier: Annastacia Palaszczuk; Steven Miles
- Preceded by: Stirling Hinchliffe
Ministerial positions (2020–2023)
Succeeded by	Charis Mullen
Minister for Children and Youth Justice
In office 12 November 2020 – 18 May 2023
Premier	Annastacia Palaszczuk
Preceded by	Position established
Succeeded by	Di Farmer (Note: For "Youth Justice".)

Member of the Legislative Assembly of Queensland for Nudgee
- Incumbent
- Assumed office 31 January 2015
- Preceded by: Jason Woodforth

Personal details
- Born: Leanne Maree Linard; 29 October 1980 (age 45) Wagga Wagga, New South Wales, Australia
- Party: Labor
- Children: 2
- Education: Queensland University of Technology
- Website: leannelinard.com.au

Leanne Maree Linard (born 29 October 1980) is an Australian politician. She has been the Labor Party member for Nudgee in the Legislative Assembly of Queensland since 2015. On 12 November 2020, Linard was sworn in as a cabinet minister in the third Palaszczuk government as Minister for Children and Youth Justice and Minister for Multicultural Affairs. Her responsibilities as Minister included adoption, child protection services, youth justice, the redress scheme for Queensland survivors of institutional child sexual abuse and multicultural affairs.

Linard grew up in Banyo, lived in Nundah for many years, and along with her husband Ian, is now raising her two young boys in Northgate. Leanne attended Virginia State Primary and was School Captain of Banyo State High (now Earnshaw State College). As the daughter of a RAAF pilot and engineer, Leanne has grown up knowing the value of community service.

Leanne currently serves as Shadow Minister for Environment, Science, Innovation and Climate Change, as well as a Member of the Ethics Committee.

== Notes ==
Parliament of Queensland
Preceded by Jason Woodforth	Member for Nudgee; 2015–present	Incumbent
