= Roland Hislop =

Australian politician

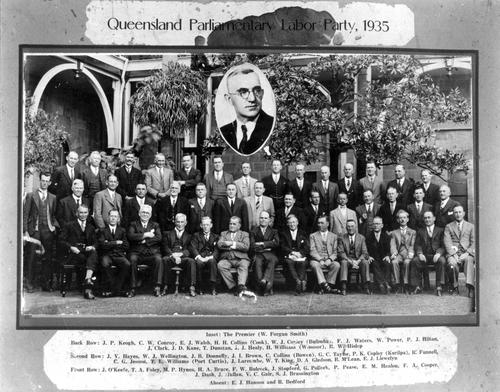
- Queensland Parliamentary Labor Party, 1935 - Hislop is on the far right in the back row.

Member of the Queensland Legislative Assembly for Sandgate
- In office 11 May 1935 – 29 March 1941
- Preceded by: Hubert Sizer
- Succeeded by: Eric Decker

Personal details
- Born: Roland William Hislop; 20 April 1884 Brisbane, Queensland, Australia
- Died: 30 May 1948 (aged 64) Brisbane, Queensland, Australia
- Party: Labor
- Spouse: Daisy Elizabeth Davidge (m.1909 d.1953)
- Occupation: Furniture manufacturer

Roland William Hislop (20 April 1884 – 30 May 1948) was a member of the Queensland Legislative Assembly.

== Biography ==
Hislop was born in Brisbane, Queensland, the son of William Hislop and his wife Alice (née Toyne) and educated in Brisbane. He was a well-known furniture manufacturer and after he was finished in politics worked as a welfare officer with the Queensland Apprenticeships Committee.

On 21 December 1909, he married Daisy Elizabeth Davidge (died 1953). Hislop died in May 1948 and was cremated at the Mt Thompson Crematorium.

== Public career ==
Hislop won the seat of Sandgate for the Labor Party at the 1935 Queensland state election, defeating James Kenny of the Country and Progressive National Party. He went on to hold the seat for six years before his defeat at the 1941 Queensland state election by Eric Decker of the Country Party.

Parliament of Queensland
| Preceded by Hubert Sizer | Member for Sandgate; 1935–1941 | Succeeded by Eric Decker |
