= Hubert Sizer =

Australian politician (1893–1973)

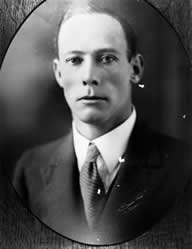

Member of the Queensland Legislative Assembly for Nundah
- In office 16 March 1918 – 15 May 1923
- Preceded by: Thomas Bridges
- Succeeded by: Wiliam Kelso

Member of the Queensland Legislative Assembly for Sandgate
- In office 15 May 1923 – 11 May 1935
- Preceded by: New seat
- Succeeded by: Roland Hislop

Personal details
- Born: Hubert Ebenezer Sizer; 7 August 1893 Cambridge, Cambridgeshire, England
- Died: 4 May 1973 (aged 79) Murrindindi, Victoria, Australia
- Party: National
- Other political affiliations: United Party of Queensland, Country and Progressive National Party
- Spouse(s): Florence Jane Sturgiss (m. 1917 d. 1920), Ruby Ann Hawkins (m. 1923)
- Occupation: Journalist

Hubert Ebenezer Sizer (7 August 1893 – 4 May 1973) was an Australian politician. He was a member of the Legislative Assembly of Queensland from 1918 to 1935, representing Nundah until 1923 and Sandgate thereafter. He was a member of the National, the United Party of Queensland, and then the Country and Progressive National parties.

Parliament of Queensland
Preceded by Thomas Bridges	Member for Nundah; 1918–1923	Succeeded by Wiliam Kelso
New seat	Member for Sandgate; 1923–1935	Succeeded by Roland Hislop
