= Harry Dean (politician) =

Australian politician

Harry Dean JP

Member of the Queensland Legislative Assembly for Sandgate
- In office 28 May 1960 – 12 November 1977
- Preceded by: Thomas Ahearn
- Succeeded by: Nev Warburton

Personal details
- Born: Harold Dean; 20 February 1913 Brisbane, Queensland, Australia
- Died: 28 February 1997 (aged 84) Sandgate, Queensland, Australia
- Party: Labor
- Spouse: Iris Lillian Toppin (m.1977 )
- Occupation: Public servant

Harold Dean (20 February 1913 – 28 February 1997) was a Queensland politician, and served as the member for Sandgate for the Labor from 1960 to 1977.

Parliament of Queensland
Preceded by Thomas Ahearn	Member for Sandgate; 1960–1977	Succeeded by Nev Warburton
