= Jason Woodforth =

Australian politician

Member of the Queensland Legislative Assembly for Nudgee
- In office 24 March 2012 – 31 January 2015
- Preceded by: Neil Roberts
- Succeeded by: Leanne Linard

Personal details
- Born: 27 November 1970 (age 55) Brisbane, Queensland, Australia
- Party: Independent
- Other political affiliations: Liberal National; Health Australia Party
- Children: 2
- Profession: Sales representative, sales manager, fitness business owner

Jason Ross Woodforth (born 27 November 1970) is an Australian Liberal National politician who was the member of the Legislative Assembly of Queensland for Nudgee from 2012 to 2015.

== Biography ==
Jason Woodforth was born in Brisbane on 27 November 1970. He was educated at Craigslea and Brisbane State High Schools. He runs a bodybuilding supplements business, Bodyzone sports supplements, and is managing director of supplement importing company International Brands Direct. He also serves as the Australian vice president and Queensland president of the International Natural Bodybuilding Association. He has won a 'promoter's contest' in bodybuilding held by the INBA.

== Fluoridation ==
Woodforth was quoted by the Courier Mail as being in support of ceasing fluoridation of the Queensland water supply. This was at odds with Woodforth's maiden speech, where he was concerned by rising health care costs in Australia. He has been disciplined by prominent Queensland LNP member and former dentist John-Paul Langbroek for these comments, as well as receiving a critical editorial from the Courier Mail. Andrew Wong of the Australian Dental Association agreed with ABC AM interviewer Annie Guest that the LNP was possibly appeasing an "uninformed minority". In this interview, Woodforth avoided answering questions regarding his lack of formal education he had in health care, by stating "What I say to people is you actually don't need letters after your name to work out what's right and what's wrong".

Parliament of Queensland
Preceded by Neil Roberts	Member for Nudgee; 2012–2015	Succeeded by Leanne Linard
