= Neil Roberts (politician) =

Australian politician

The Hon Neil Roberts
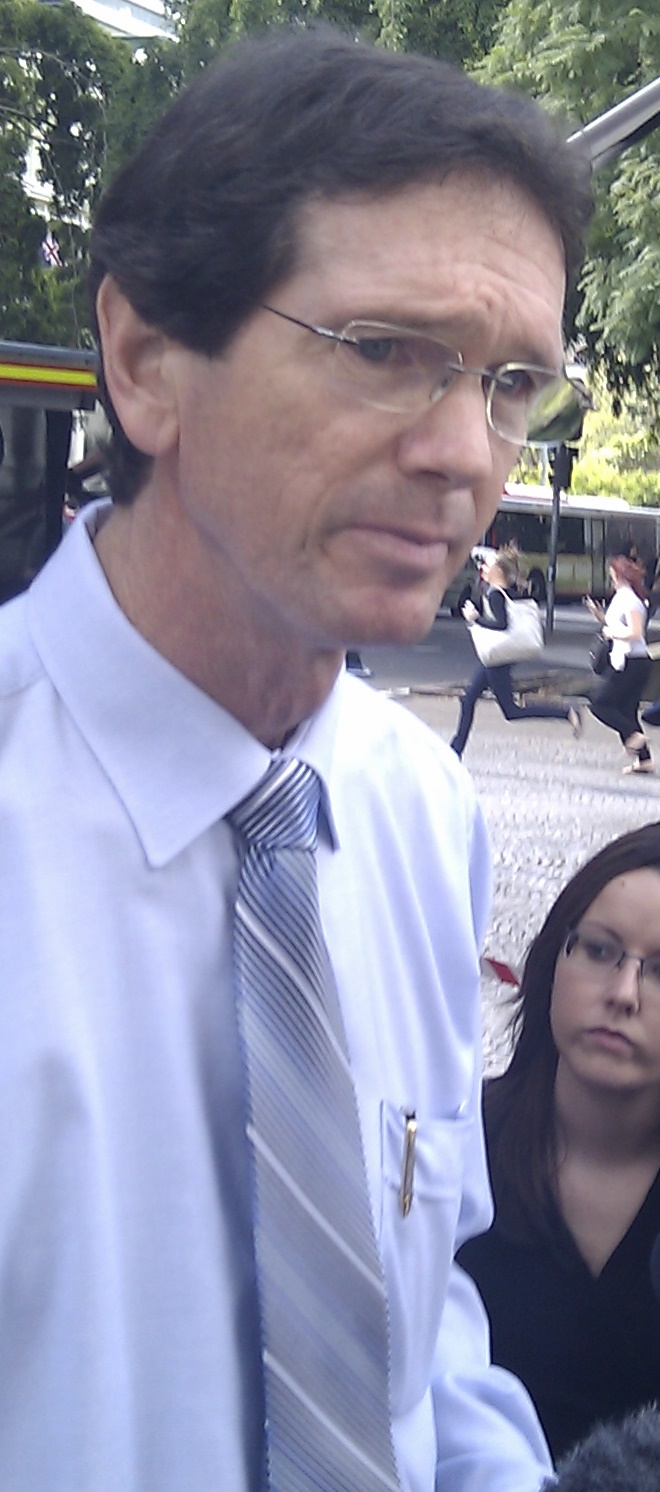
- Roberts at a media conference, May 2010

Queensland Minister for Police, Emergency Services and Corrective Services
- In office 26 March 2009 – 26 March 2012
- Constituency: Nudgee

Member of Parliament for Member of the Queensland Parliament for Nudgee
- In office 15 July 1995 – 24 March 2012
- Preceded by: Ken Vaughan
- Succeeded by: Jason Woodforth

Personal details
- Born: Neil Stuart Roberts; 3 January 1955 (age 71) Charleville, Queensland, Australia
- Party: Labor
- Education: Queensland University of Technology
- Occupation: Electrician, Industrial Advocate for the Electrical Trades Union

Neil Stuart Roberts (born 3 January 1955) is a former Australian politician.

== Politics ==
Roberts represented the seat of Nudgee in the Legislative Assembly of Queensland from 1995 to 2012. He was the Minister for Emergency Services, Corrective Services, and Police in Queensland.

On 11 December 2011, he announced he would not be contesting the 2012 Queensland state election.

Parliament of Queensland
Preceded by Ken Vaughan	Member for Nudgee; 1995–2012	Succeeded by Jason Woodforth
