= Thomas Ahearn (Australian politician) =

Australian politician (1929–2021)

Member of the Queensland Legislative Assembly for Sandgate
- In office 3 August 1957 – 28 May 1960
- Preceded by: Herbert Robinson
- Succeeded by: Harry Dean

Personal details
- Born: Thomas Gipps Ahearn; 6 August 1929 Nanango, Queensland, Australia
- Died: 21 March 2021 (aged 91) Clayfield, Queensland, Australia
- Party: Liberal Party
- Spouse: Sonia Rochelle Davies (m. 1952, died 2016)
- Education: University of Queensland
- Occupation: Mechanical engineer

Thomas Gipps Ahearn (6 August 1929 – 10 March 2021) was an Australian politician who was a member of the Queensland Legislative Assembly.

== Biography ==
Thomas Gipps Ahearn was born on 6 August 1929 at Nanango, Queensland, the son of Leslie Norman Ahearn and his wife Hilda Christina (née Hansen). He was educated at the Toowoomba Anglican College and Preparatory School, the Slade School, Warwick, and Toowoomba Grammar School before going on to the University of Queensland. He was the senior chemistry master at The Southport School in 1949-1950 and in 1957 established the company TH Ahearn and Co which he ran until 1997.

On 28 June 1952 he married Sonia Rochelle Davies (died 2016) and together had a son and two daughters. He died on 10 March 2021, at the age of 91.

== Public career ==
Ahearn won the seat of Sandgate for the Liberal Party at the 1957 Queensland state election, defeating Harry Dean of the Labor Party and the sitting member, Herbert Robinson of the Queensland Labor Party. Ahearn held the seat for one term, losing to Harry Dean in 1960.

Parliament of Queensland
Preceded by Herbert Robinson	Member for Sandgate; 1957–1960	Succeeded by Harry Dean
