= Herbert Robinson (Queensland politician) =

Australian politician (1893–1969)

Member of the Queensland Legislative Assembly for Sandgate
- In office 7 March 1953 – 3 August 1957
- Preceded by: Eric Decker
- Succeeded by: Thomas Ahearn

Personal details
- Born: Herbert Freemont Robinson; 20 May 1893 Comet, Queensland, Australia
- Died: 3 June 1969 (aged 76) Greenslopes, Queensland
- Resting place: Nudgee Cemetery
- Party: Queensland Labor Party
- Other political affiliations: Labor
- Spouse: Agnes Amelia Doran (m.1924 d.1958 )
- Occupation: Railway worker

Herbert Freemont Robinson (20 May 1893 – 3 June 1969) was an Australian politician, and a Member of the Queensland Legislative Assembly from 1953 until 1957 representing the seat of Sandgate.

== Early life ==
Robinson was born on 20 May 1893 in Comet, Queensland, to Philip Robinson, a school teacher, and his wife Lucy (née Mann). He was educated at Comet State School and subsequently taught as a pupil-teacher. As a youth he played rugby league for Toowoomba and Ipswich. By 1915, he was working as a railway porter in Toowoomba.

He enlisted in the First Australian Imperial Force on 27 August 1915 as a Private, embarking for active service in Egypt on 31 January 1916 aboard T.S. Wandilla and transferring to the 2nd Pioneer Battalion where he saw service in both Egypt and France. He was wounded in action in May 1917, and was out of the war for much of 1918 due to illness. In April 1919 he joined the AIF Education Service where he worked as a Duty Librarian. He returned to Brisbane in July 1919 and was discharged there with the rank of Sergeant on 27 August 1919. He was awarded the British War Medal and Victory Medal.

Robinson worked variously in the railways of Queensland for much of his life. He was a porter in Wyreema, Maryborough and Gympie over 1919–1920, and a shunter in Ipswich and Bundamba until 1925. While working in Ipswich, he married Agnes Doran on 14 July 1924, with whom he has two sons and three daughters. From 1925 until 1942, Robinson was employed as a guard on the Kingaroy line, and then became a first-class guard at Shorncliffe in 1942, and moved his family to nearby Sandgate.

== Politics ==
As a railway employee, Robinson had become involved with the Australian Railways Union and was elected to its executive. He joined the Labor Party and was an active worker in the Nanango and Sandgate branches. His wife was also an organiser for the Storemen and Packers' Union.

At the 1950 state election, as a Labor candidate, he unsuccessfully contested the seat of Sandgate against the Liberal incumbent, Eric Decker. However, in the 1953 state election on 7 March 1953, he achieved a 10% swing against Decker and won the seat. He held the seat in 1956 election.

On 24 April 1957, Queensland Premier Vince Gair was expelled from the Labor Party, and a number of mostly Catholic Labor MPs joined him in forming a new Queensland Labor Party, with Robinson joining on 26 April 1957. Robinson lost at the subsequent state election on 3 August 1957 to Liberal candidate Thomas Ahearn.

== Later life ==
After his defeat, he worked as a railways clerk in Brisbane until his retirement in 1959. He died on 3 June 1969 in Greenslopes at the Repatriation Hospital, and was buried in the Nudgee Catholic Cemetery.

== See also ==
- Members of the Queensland Legislative Assembly, 1953–1956
- Members of the Queensland Legislative Assembly, 1956–1957

Parliament of Queensland
Preceded by Eric Decker	Member for Sandgate; 1953–1957	Succeeded by Thomas Ahearn
