= John William Greene =

Australian politician (1876–1959)

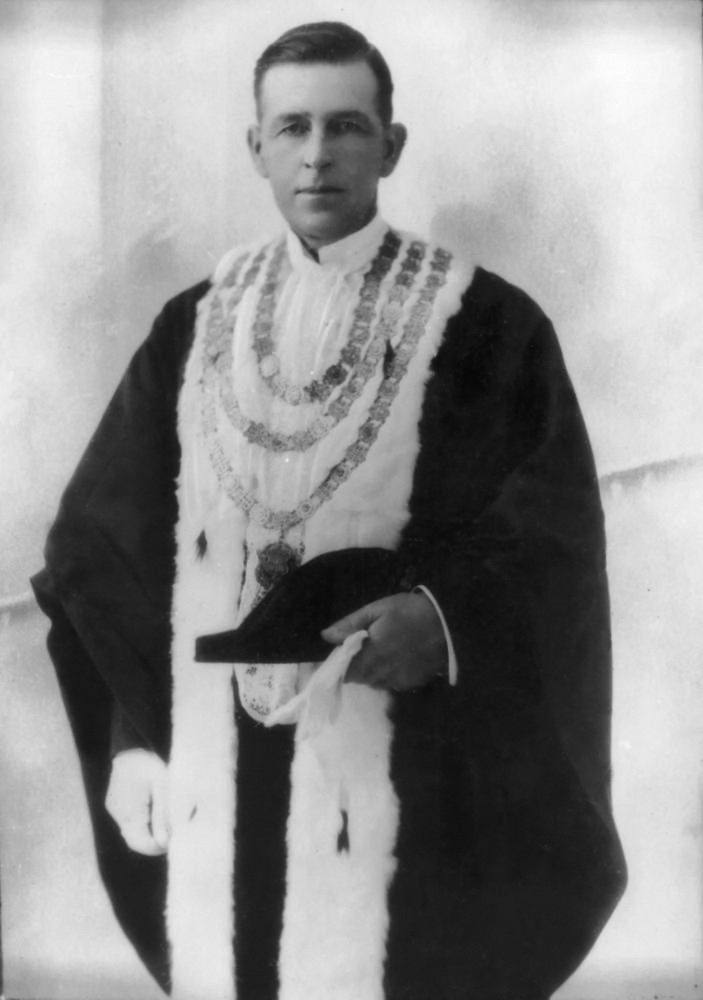

3rd Lord Mayor of Brisbane
- In office 11 May 1931 – 13 May 1934
- Preceded by: Archibald Watson
- Succeeded by: Alfred James Jones

Mayor of Wynnum
- In office 23 July 1921 – 1 October 1925
- Preceded by: Samuel Greene
- Succeeded by: Position Abolished

Personal details
- Born: 3 September 1876 Cardiff, Wales
- Died: 7 October 1959 (aged 83) Brisbane, Australia
- Party: Progress Party

John William Greene (3 September 1876, in Cardiff, Wales – 7 October 1959, in Brisbane, Australia) was the Lord Mayor of Brisbane from 1931 to 1934.

He was the last Mayor of Wynnum before the 1925 amalgamation, and was the only one who was popularly elected. His brother Sam, was the first Mayor of Wynnum in 1913.

== Life ==
Green was born in Cardiff. His Methodist parents were Ellen Webber (born Greenham) and her husband John Ily Green who had lived in Bridport in Dorset. He was one of their eleven children. His father designed and built Moreton Bay College where five of his sisters taught.

== Wynnum Town Council ==
Prior to the formation of Brisbane City Council in 1925, the Brisbane area was split amongst many Cities, Towns and Shires, including the Town of Wynnum.

Greene was the last Mayor of Wynnum. Greene won the election for mayor, held on Saturday 23 July 1921, for a three-year term, winning with 1137 votes against four other candidates, many of whom would run against him in future elections. He was the first popularly elected Mayor of Wynnum, as previously only land owners could vote. Greene then successfully nominated for Mayor for 5 April 1924 elections. Greene was elected mayor with 1334 votes over his nearest rival's 1118 votes, with a third candidate getting 668 votes, for a term that would last less than a year before Wynnum was amalgamated into Brisbane. Mayor Greene was against the Town of Wynnum being included in a Greater Brisbane, but his wishes were denied.

Greene's brother Samuel Greene, a local builder and owner of the Star Theatre, was the inaugural Mayor of the Town of Wynnum in 1913 (after being elected an alderman in Ward 2) when it changed from being a Shire to a Town.

== Formation of Brisbane City Council & 1925 Elections ==
With the formation of Brisbane City Council, Wynnum Town Council was absorbed into the new Council representing Greater Brisbane. John Greene ran for the ward of Wynnum as an Independent. In a very competitive race between 4 candidates, Wynnum was won by William Dart, the United Party candidate on 1,333 votes to 1,298 for Greene, with Francis O'Driscoll on 1,115 votes, Joseph Curtis 650 votes, and George Hymer last on 229 votes. Dart was an incumbent alderman for Wynnum Town Council. The other candidates were not sitting aldermen, with two of them unsuccessful candidates in past election at Wynnum Town Council.

== Lord Mayor of Brisbane ==
Greene was the alderman (councillor) of Wynnum and Mayor of Brisbane from 1931 to 1934, which was also his only term in Brisbane City Council. Greene was elected as an alderman to the Wynnum Ward defeating incumbent William Dart. Greene was elected at a time when there was not universal suffrage for Brisbane City Council elections (only land owners could vote), and was never a popularly elected mayor. When universal suffrage was restored for the 1934 election, the opposition Labor Party won easily.

=== 1931 General Election ===
The 1931 Municipal Elections saw a dramatic change in council, with 10 of the majority Nationalist Citizens Party losing their wards. The incumbent mayor, Archibald Watson, the alderman for Toowong, was defeated, losing his ward to a rival candidate, from the Civic Reform party. Watson had been appointed acting mayor when the incumbent William Jolly retired before the end of his term. The Nationalist Citizens Party was left with only two aldermen out of 20 wards, so Watson would not have retained the Mayoralty even if he had of won his ward, as the State had changed the rules to elect Mayors by a majority vote of the aldermen. This was because the election was held during a time of brief conservative control of the State Government with Arthur Edward Moore, Premier of Queensland. It was anticipated upon the Moore Government's election that the Brisbane City Council would be broken up and that major amendments would be made to City of Brisbane Act 1924. But the critics of a Greater Brisbane were proven to be disappointed, with the rural-based Moore Government taking little interest in metropolitan affairs, and while making some significant changes it left the Council essentially intact. Universal suffrage was removed, in favour of occupier franchise and plural voting, which was expected to favour the incumbent regime. The number of aldermen were reduced by one, and the mayor was to be elected by a vote amongst the aldermen, rather than by direct election. However it was also the time of the Great Depression in Australia, which caused the demise of many administrations, including Brisbane's, and Mayor Watson was reluctantly forced to admit that Council had a large cash shortage. In addition he was taking criticism from the left from the Labor Party over the unfairness of the loss of universal suffrage, and far more severe criticism from the right from various businessmen who wanted to slash Council's costs despite the depression. The conservative vote was split between three conservative parties (Nationalist Citizens, Civic Reform and Progress), with the Civic Reform Party formed in opposition to what they saw as insufficient changes by the Moore Government, and the Progress Party supportive of the government's changes. With the conservative vote split, Labor Party managed to out perform expectations and win 8 wards.

=== 1931 Mayoral Election ===
Alderman Greene, the leader of the Progress Party was elected as Lord Mayor on Thursday 14 May 1931, 13 votes to 7 among the city aldermen. He was a compromise candidate, as the winning Labor Party had won 8 wards, and to avoid the anti-Labor Civic Reform Party winning (7 aldermen led by Alderman Falukner, who lost the mayoralty vote to Billy Greene), they joined with three Independent Progressives (including Greene) and the two remaining Nationalist Citizens aldermen to make Greene mayor. Due to the harshness of the Civic Reform campaign they were totally excluded from the Council executive.

=== Uniting Conservatives ===
While Greene started out as an independent, later aligned with the Progress Party, he ultimately aligned with conservative politics. While he was elected Lord Mayor by the Labor Party votes, by the end of his term, he had joined a consolidated faction of Conservative aldermen, where it seemed he was the popular choice as leader. The Nationalist Citizens Party was strengthened to support all non-Labor candidates, and generally endorsed the incumbent Nationalist, Civic Reform and Independent candidates, although one non-Labor alderman, H. Massey of Toowong did not join, and won re-election easily. Only one incumbent, George Vickers of Windsor Ward, was refused the nomination. Two others, former Civic Reform leader Faulkener and Stephen Payne did not seek endorsement and did not contest the election, Payne due to redistricting. For the next few decades, the CMO was the conservative party contesting the Brisbane City Council elections.

=== 1934 Election ===
With the Labor Government back in power, the 1934 election saw the Mayor directly elected by the voters, and Greene lost to Labor candidate Alfred Jones. Most of the CMO candidates lost, with Labor winning 14 wards to 6.

Greene did not serve as an alderman again. Despite the poor showing at the 1934 election, Wynnum was won back by the CMO's William Dart, who had previously served the Wynnum Ward from 1925 to 1931 (before his loss to Greene in the 1931 election), and with Greene running for mayor, Dart was able to win the vacated ward of Wynnum in 1934. Dart held the ward until 1938, before he resigned from council in October to contest the State Legislative Assembly seat of Wynnum, causing a by-election.

Preceded by Archibald Watson	Lord Mayor of Brisbane; 1931–1934	Succeeded by Alfred James Jones
