= Archibald Watson (mayor) =

Australian politician

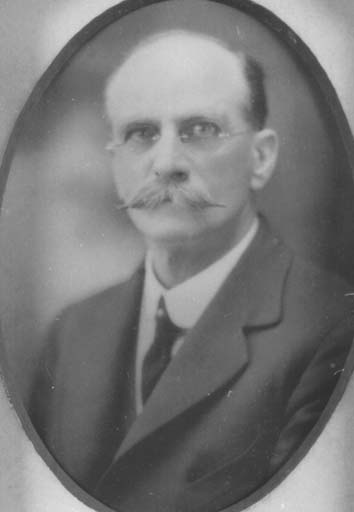

2nd Lord Mayor of Brisbane
- In office 24 February 1931 – 11 May 1931
- Preceded by: William Jolly
- Succeeded by: John William Greene

Personal details
- Born: 22 October 1874 Dundee, Scotland
- Died: 25 February 1941 (aged 66) Brisbane, Queensland
- Party: Queensland United Party
- Other political affiliations: Nationalist Civic Party

Archibald Watson was briefly the Lord Mayor of Brisbane in 1931. Watson had previously been Mayor of Toowong before the 1925 merger of the Brisbane councils.

== Personal life ==
Archibald Watson was born on 22 October 1874 in Dundee, Angus, Scotland, the son of George Watson and his wife Mary Ann Gilruth (née Taylor).

He married Maud May Clark in Brisbane on 4 April 1901.

Archibald Watson died on 25 Feb 1941 aged 66 years following a long illness. He was buried in Toowong Cemetery.

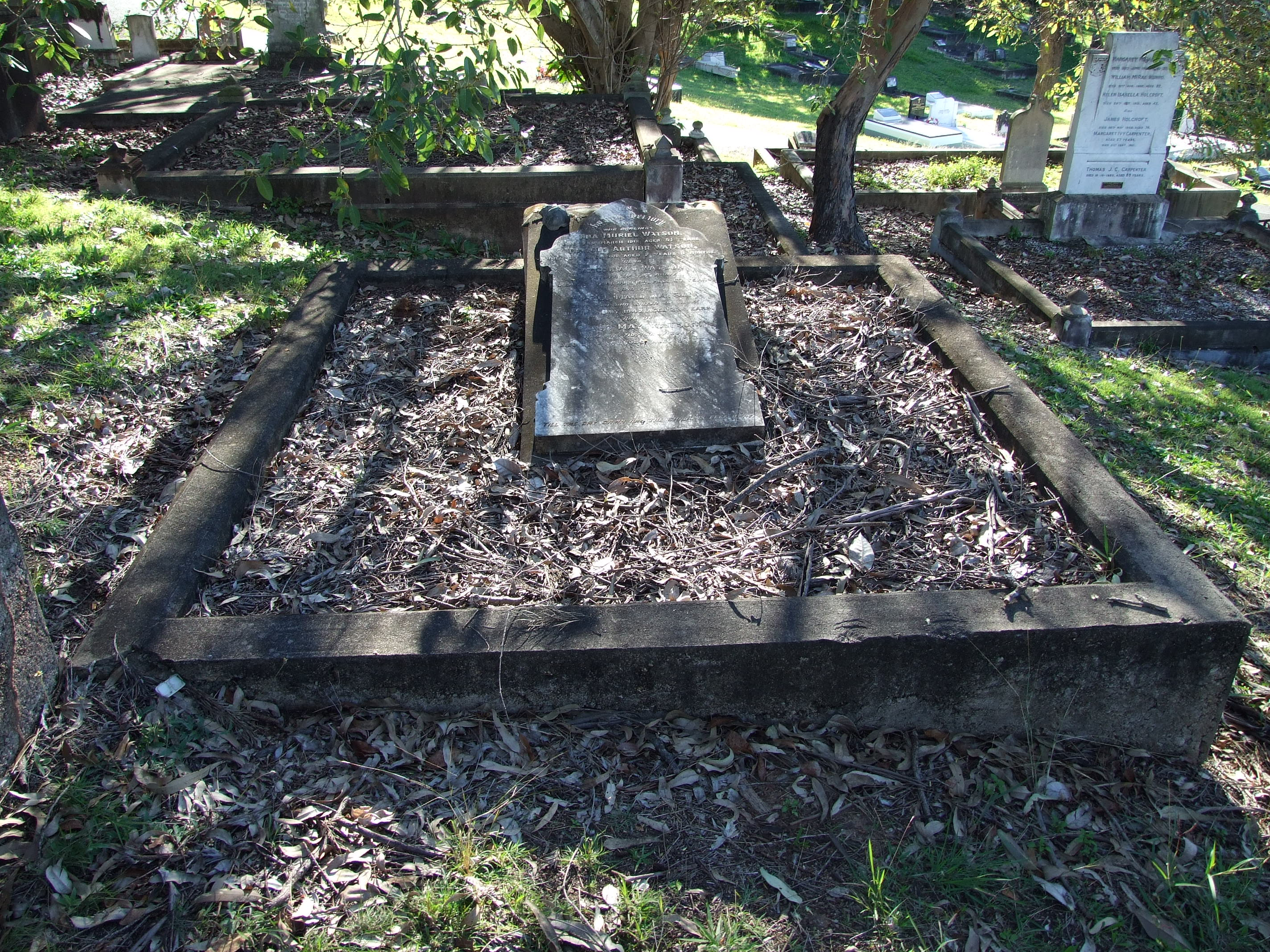
The grave of Archibald Watson at Brisbane's Toowong Cemetery.

== Public life ==
Archibald Watson was the Chairman of the Toowong Fire Brigade, which built a fire station in Jephson Street, Toowong, in 1919.

Archibald Watson was (briefly) the last mayor of Town of Toowong prior to its amalgamation into Greater Brisbane in 1925. On the last election for Toowong, held on Saturday 12 April 1924, Watson was elected Mayor, 2884 votes to 2278 votes for his opponent, A. H. Fisher, in the race to replace Charles Patterson, for a term that lasted less than a year.

The elections for an amalgamated Brisbane City Council were held on 21 February 1925. At the election where William Jolly was the popularly elected Lord Mayor, Watson like Jolly running for the United Party, won the ward of Toowong in a landslide, winning 4,607 to 2103 votes. He served as an alderman for Toowong between 1926 and his election loss in 1931. In April 1926, Hugh Russell the Deputy Mayor and Alderman for Toombul resigned to run for a seat in the State Assembly. Watson was voted in as his replacement as Deputy Mayor. Upon William Jolly's mid-term retirement in early 1931, Watson was then duly elected by a majority of Alderman Lord Mayor for a brief period between 24 February and 11 May 1931.

While on the Brisbane City Council, Archibald Watson served on the following committees:

- Finance Committee 1925–1930
- Tenders & Stores Committee 1925–1931
- Parks & Recreation Committee 1925–1927 (chairman)
- Town Planning & Housing Committee 1925 (chairman)
- General Purposes Committee 1925
- Transit Committee 1926–1931 (chairman)
- Licensing Committee 1926–1937
- Markets & Miscellaneous Committee 1926–1927
- Resumptions Committee 1926–1927
- Electric Light & Powerhouse Committee 1928–1931 (chairman)
- Water Supply & Sewerage Committee 1929, 1931

== Later life and death ==
After his landslide 1931 election defeat, Watson was never elected to Brisbane City Council again. After the formation of the anti-Labor Citizens' Municipal Organisation, Watson unsuccessfully sought to be nominated as the CMO Lord Mayoral candidate, with the incumbent John William Greene being selected. Watson was however successful in obtaining the CMO nomination for the Toowong Ward for the 1937 election, which he failed to win against conservative independent Harry Massey.

He died, in 1941, aged 66 years after a long illness.

== See also ==
- List of mayors and lord mayors of Brisbane

Preceded by William Jolly	Lord Mayor of Brisbane; 1931	Succeeded by John William Greene
