= Ken Vaughan =

Australian politician

Member of the Queensland Legislative Assembly for Nudgee
- In office 12 November 1977 – 15 July 1995
- Preceded by: Jack Melloy
- Succeeded by: Neil Roberts

Personal details
- Born: Kenneth Hamilton Vaughan; 29 October 1934 Townsville, Queensland, Australia
- Died: 22 June 2011 (aged 76) Brisbane, Queensland, Australia
- Party: Labor
- Spouse: Lesley Cowdroy (m.1959)
- Occupation: Electrician, trade union assistant secretary

Kenneth Hamilton Vaughan (29 October 1934 – 22 June 2011) was an Australian politician.

Vaughan's father Clifford Llewelyn Vaughan, a butcher, died from blood poisoning in 1939 and he was raised by his mother, Ruby Sarah, in Richmond, attending school in Charters Towers. He was sent to Brisbane to live with his aunt in 1950 to begin work as a clerk for Queensland Railways. He concluded his apprenticeship in 1955, but was conscripted for national service in August 1956, serving as an army sergeant at Wacol. In 1958 he was elected shop steward for the Electrical Trades Union (ETU), and in 1959 married Lesley Cowdroy, in which year he also joined the Labor Party.

In 1974 Vaughan contested the Senate unsuccessfully, and was subsequently appointed the ETU's assistant state secretary. In 1977 he was elected to the Legislative Assembly of Queensland for the seat of Nudgee. When Labor won office in 1989 under Wayne Goss, Vaughan was appointed Minister for Resource Industries. In 1991 he was appointed Minister for Employment, Training and Industrial Relations, but he retired to the backbench in 1992 and from politics in 1995.

Parliament of Queensland
Preceded by Jack Melloy	Member for Nudgee; 1977–1995	Succeeded by Neil Roberts
