= Alexander Skirving =

The Hon Alexander Skirving
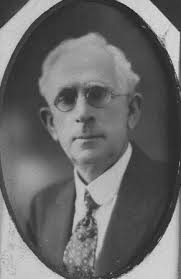

Member of the Queensland Legislative Council
- In office 18 August 1919 – 23 March 1922

Personal details
- Born: Alexander Skirving; 1868 Edinburgh, Scotland
- Died: 28 June 1935 (aged 66 or 67) Brisbane, Queensland, Australia
- Party: Labor
- Spouse: Isabella Hyland (m. 1907, d. 1953)
- Occupation: Trade union secretary

Alexander Skirving (1868 – 28 June 1935) was a trade union secretary and member of the Queensland Legislative Council.

Skirving was born at Edinburgh, Scotland to Alexander Skirving Snr. and his wife Mary Ann (née Hunt). Moving to Brisbane at an early age, he attended Kangaroo Point State School. He was an apprentice lithographer before being appointed as secretary of the hairdressers union. Skirving was President of the Queensland Industrial Council from 1914 to 1916 and, representing the seat of Maree, an alderman with the Brisbane City Council for four years from 1931.

== Political career ==
When the Labour Party starting forming governments in Queensland, it found much of its legislation being blocked by a hostile Council, where members had been appointed for life by successive conservative governments. After a failed referendum in May 1917, Premier Ryan tried a new tactic, and later that year advised the Governor, Sir Hamilton John Goold-Adams, to appoint thirteen new members whose allegiance lay with Labour to the council.

In August 1919, Skirving was one of three additional new members, and went on to serve for two and a half years until the council was abolished in March 1922.

== Personal life ==
On 20 March 1907, Skirving married Isabella Hyland and together they had one son, Alexander Jnr. A member of the Independent Order of Good Templars, Skirving died in Brisbane in June 1935 and was cremated at Mount Thompson Crematorium.
