= Electoral district of Nudgee =

State electoral district of Queensland, Australia

Nudgee Queensland—Legislative Assembly
- Electoral map of Nudgee 2017
- State: Queensland
- Dates current: 1960–present
- MP: Leanne Linard
- Party: Labor
- Namesake: Nudgee
- Electors: 37,845 (2020)
- Area: 42 km^{2} (16.2 sq mi)
- Demographic: Outer-metropolitan
- Coordinates: 27°22′S 153°4′E
Electorates around Nudgee:
Sandgate	Sandgate	Moreton Bay
Aspley	Nudgee	Clayfield
Stafford	Clayfield	Clayfield

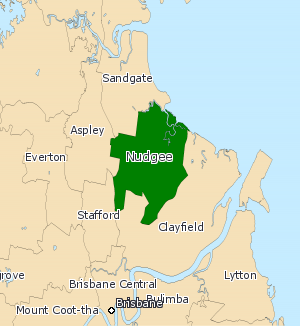
Electoral map of Nudgee 2008

Nudgee is an electoral district of the Legislative Assembly in the Australian state of Queensland. It is located in the north-eastern suburbs of Brisbane.

== Members for Nudgee ==
Member	Party	Term
Jack Melloy	Labor	1960–1977
Ken Vaughan	Labor	1977–1995
Neil Roberts	Labor	1995–2012
Jason Woodforth	Liberal National	2012–2015
Leanne Linard	Labor	2015–present

== Election results ==
2024 Queensland state election: Nudgee
Party	Candidate	Votes	%	±%
Labor	Leanne Linard	16,860	48.20	−3.30
Liberal National	Robert Wilson	11,137	31.84	+1.84
Greens	Jim Davies	4,721	13.50	+0.30
One Nation	Joshua Baer	1,248	3.57	+0.07
Family First	Sharan Hall	591	1.69	+1.69
Independent	Bruce Tanti	419	1.20	+1.20
Total formal votes		34,976	97.08	
Informal votes		1,053	2.92	
Turnout		36,029	89.80	
Two-party-preferred result
Labor	Leanne Linard	21,686	62.00	−3.10
Liberal National	Robert Wilson	13,290	38.00	+3.10
Labor hold		Swing	-3.10	
