= Electoral district of Sandgate =

Sandgate Queensland—Legislative Assembly
- Electoral map of Sandgate 2017
- State: Queensland
- MP: Bisma Asif
- Party: Labor
- Namesake: Sandgate
- Electors: 36,858 (2020)
- Area: 35 km^{2} (13.5 sq mi)
- Demographic: Outer-metropolitan
- Coordinates: 27°19′S 153°3′E
Electorates around Sandgate:
Aspley	Murrumba	Moreton Bay
Aspley	Sandgate	Moreton Bay
Aspley	Nudgee	Nudgee

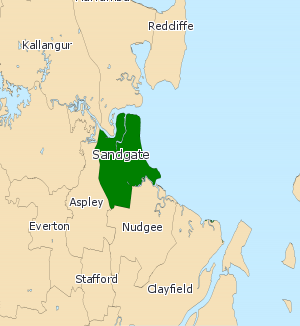
Electoral map of Sandgate 2008

Sandgate is an electoral division in the state of Queensland, Australia.

It is located in the northern suburbs of Brisbane, covering Sandgate, Shorncliffe, Deagon, Brighton, Bracken Ridge, Fitzgibbon and Taigum. The whole electorate is located within the local government area of the City of Brisbane.

Until 2024, Sandgate was held by Stirling Hinchliffe of the Labor Party. The seat was held by former Labor leader Nev Warburton and former health minister Gordon Nuttall.

== Members for Sandgate ==
Member	Party	Term
Hubert Sizer	United/Country and Progressive National	1923–1935
Roland Hislop	Labor	1935–1941
Eric Decker	Country/Queensland People's/Liberal	1941–1953
Herbert Robinson	Labor	1953–1957
Herbert Robinson	Queensland Labor	1957
Thomas Ahearn	Liberal	1957–1960
Harry Dean	Labor	1960–1977
Nev Warburton	Labor	1977–1992
Gordon Nuttall	Labor	1992–2006
Vicky Darling	Labor	2006–2012
Kerry Millard	Liberal National	2012–2015
Stirling Hinchliffe	Labor	2015–2024
Bisma Asif	Labor	2024–present

== Election results ==
2024 Queensland state election: Sandgate
Party	Candidate	Votes	%	±%
Labor	Bisma Asif	15,703	45.94	−8.56
Liberal National	Chris Mangan	11,497	33.64	+6.94
Greens	Rachel Kennedy	3,896	11.40	−0.40
One Nation	Glen Barry	1,356	3.97	−1.23
Independent Democrat	Chris Simpson	892	2.61	+2.61
Family First	Russell Gee	611	1.79	+1.79
Independent	Victor Barwick	223	0.65	+0.65
Total formal votes		34,178	96.09	
Informal votes		1,389	3.91	
Turnout		35,567	91.57	
Two-party-preferred result
Labor	Bisma Asif	20,372	59.61	−7.69
Liberal National	Chris Mangan	13,806	40.39	+7.69
Labor hold		Swing	–7.69	
