= Eric Decker (politician) =

Australian politician

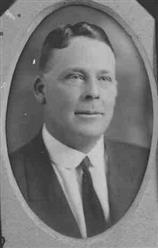

Member of the Queensland Legislative Assembly for Sandgate
- In office 29 March 1941 – 7 March 1953
- Preceded by: Roland Hislop
- Succeeded by: Herbert Robinson

Personal details
- Born: Eric Paul Decker; 22 November 1896 Roma, Queensland, Australia
- Died: 7 July 1970 (aged 73) Sandgate, Queensland, Australia
- Party: Liberal Party
- Other political affiliations: Queensland People's Party, Country Party
- Spouse: Eden Templeton Kemp (m.1926 d.1990)

Eric Paul Decker (22 November 1896 – 7 July 1970) was an Australian politician and real estate agent. He was a member of the Queensland Legislative Assembly.

== Biography ==
Decker was born at Roma, Queensland, the son of Edward Herman Decker and his wife Kate (née Johnson). He was educated at Queensland state schools and went on to the Brisbane Grammar School. After finishing his education he went into the real estate industry.

He joined the First Australian Imperial Force in 1916, and was appointed a lance corporal in June 1917 and wounded in August 1917. He was wounded again in May 1918 and discharged the following year.

On 18 September 1926 he married Eden Templeton Kemp (died 1990) and together had a son and a daughter. A keen fisherman, Decker and a friend, George Mulvena, were fishing off Sandgate when their dinghy capsized and both men drowned. He was cremated at the Albany Creek Crematorium.

== Public career ==
Decker was an alderman on the Brisbane City Council, representing the ward of Sandgate from 1931 to 1941. He was chairman of the works committee from 1939 until 1940.

He won the seat of Sandgate for the Country Party at the 1941 Queensland state election, defeating the sitting member, Roland Hislop of the Labor Party. He would later be a member of the Queensland People's Party and the Liberal Party. He represented Sandgate until the 1953 Queensland state election where in a surprise result was beaten by Labor candidate Herbert Robinson.

Parliament of Queensland
Preceded by Roland Hislop	Member for Sandgate; 1941–1953	Succeeded by Herbert Robinson
