= William Jolly =

Australian politician

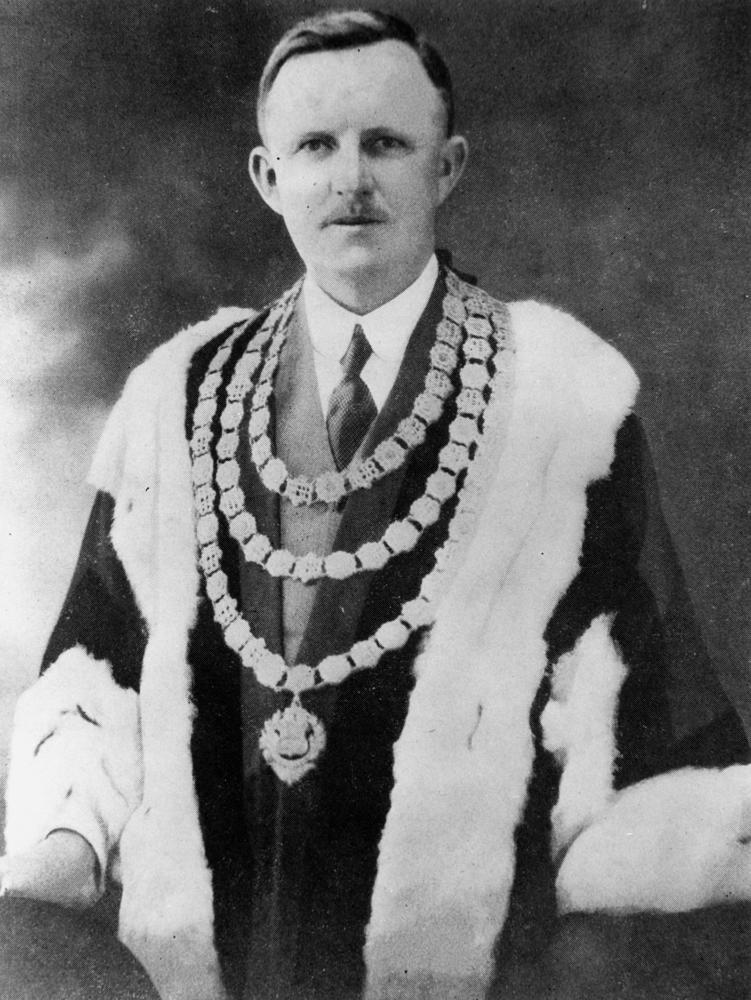

Member of the Australian Parliament for Lilley
- In office 23 October 1937 – 21 August 1943
- Preceded by: Donald Cameron
- Succeeded by: Jim Hadley

1st Lord Mayor of Brisbane
- In office 1 October 1925 – 24 February 1931
- Succeeded by: Archibald Watson

Personal details
- Born: 11 September 1881 Spring Hill, Brisbane
- Died: 30 May 1955 (aged 73) Windsor, Brisbane
- Party: United Australia Party (federal); United Party (state)
- Spouse: Lillie Maude Moorhouse
- Children: Seven sons
- Occupation: Law clerk, accountant, public servant

William Alfred Jolly CMG (11 September 1881, Spring Hill, Brisbane – 30 May 1955, Windsor, Brisbane) was an Australian politician who was the Mayor of the Town of Windsor from 1918 to 1923, the first Lord Mayor of Brisbane from 1925 to 1931, and a member of the Australian Parliament for the Division of Lilley from 1937 to 1943.

== Public life ==
In 1914, he began to practice as a public accountant. Upon the establishment of the Institute of Chartered Accountants in Australia Jolly was elected a member of the first Board. He was the director of the National Bank of Australia after it merged with the Queensland National Bank. He was councillor of Kings College at the University of Queensland, a member of the Board for the YMCA and a long-term member of the Brisbane Rotary Club.

He was elected an alderman of the Windsor Town Council in 1912, becoming the Mayor between 1918 and 1923.

In 1925, the present City of Brisbane was created through the amalgamation of the city (which previously covered only the innermost suburbs) with all of the local government areas that contained its suburbs (known as the Greater Brisbane scheme). Jolly was elected the first Lord Mayor of Brisbane in 1925 and held that role until 1931.

After seven years of agitation, Brisbane's tram service was extended to Grange in July 1928. The opening ceremony was attended by Jolly, and two Members of the Queensland Legislative Assembly, James Stevingstone Kerr and Charles Taylor. The mayor had previously threatened not to attend any ceremony for the opening of the tram service because two rival groups were organising separate celebrations; he would only attend if there was a single ceremony.

In 1928, artist Caroline Barker painted a portrait of Lord Mayor of Brisbane William Jolly in his mayoral robes and exhibited it at the Royal Queensland Art Society. Charles Herbert Gough was so impressed by the work that he initiated a public subscription to purchase the portrait as a gift for the mayor from the citizens of Brisbane. As Jolly was a popular mayor, the public were generous in their donations and the portrait was presented to the mayor in December 1928 together with a string of pearls for his wife, the Lady Mayoress.

During his time as Lord Mayor, Jolly was responsible for many civic developments, especially the arterial road network in Brisbane. The Grey Street Bridge (renamed the William Jolly Bridge shortly after his death) was built during his time in office.

In 1937 and 1940, he stood and was elected the UAP member for the Federal Division of Lilley. William Jolly retired from politics following his defeat in the 1943 general election.

He was a director of the Queensland National Bank and at the time of his death a director of the National Bank of Australasia.

== Personal life ==
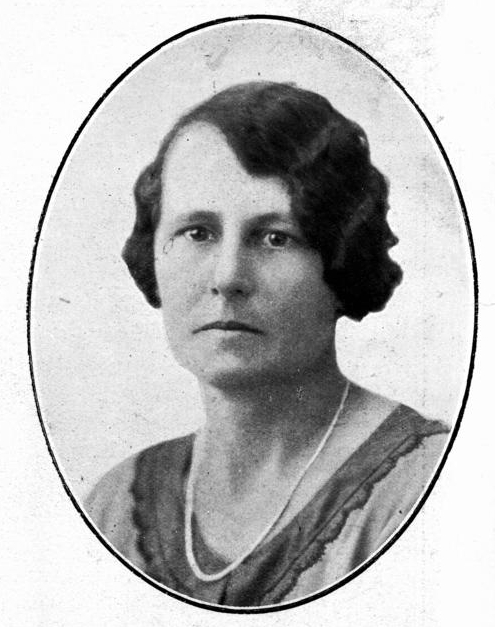
Lillie Maude Moorhouse Jolly (wife of Lord Mayor William Jolly), 1930

William Jolly was born on 11 September 1881 at Spring Hill, Brisbane, the son of Alexander Jolly, a gardener from Scotland, and his Irish wife Mary Kelly. His father was the gardener at the Glen Lyon Estate in Ashgrove. Later his father became the landscape gardener of the Ithaca Town Council and created the parkland surrounding the Ithaca War Memorial and the Ithaca Embankments (both of which are now heritage-listed).

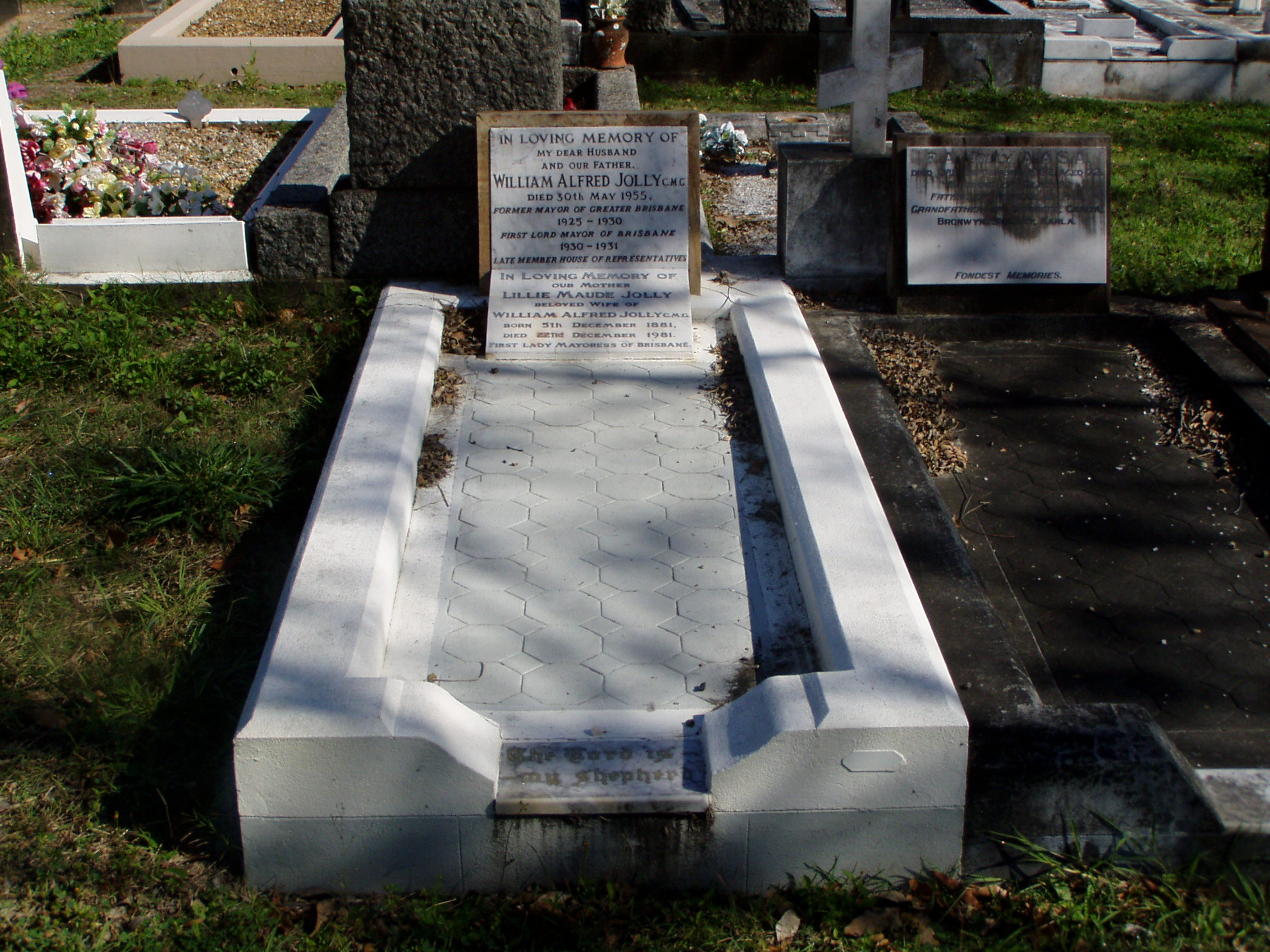
The grave of William Jolly at Brisbane's Toowong Cemetery.

Jolly was described as a family man who was active in church activities. He attended Ashgrove State School. He began working as law clerk with at a small law firm and then moved to the larger Atthow & MacGregor while studying accountancy. On 8 January 1907, he married Lillie Maude Moorhouse, the second daughter of Rev. James Moorhouse, at her parents' residence in Paddington. They had seven sons: Douglas, Frank, Arthur, William, Stanley, Harold and Norman.

Jolly died in Windsor on 30 May 1955 aged 73 years. He was buried on 31 May 1955 in Toowong Cemetery.

== Legacy ==
The following were named after him:

- William Jolly Bridge, crossing the Brisbane River between South Brisbane and the Brisbane CBD
- Jollys Lookout, a locality in the City of Moreton Bay, named after his visit in 1927
- W.A. Jolly Park, 50 Wesley Street, Lutwyche, Brisbane

On 6 April 2013, William Jolly's grandson Warren Jolly was a guest speaker at the reopening of the newly refurbished Brisbane City Hall, which was first opened by William Jolly on 8 April 1930.

Political offices
New title	Lord Mayor of Brisbane; 1925–1931	Succeeded by Archibald Watson
Parliament of Australia
Preceded by Donald Charles Cameron	Member for Lilley; 1937–1943	Succeeded by Jim Hadley
