= John Brown (Queensland politician) =

Australian politician and blacksmith

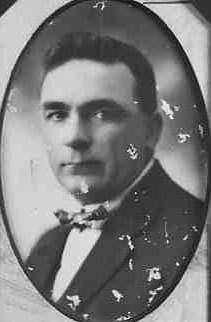

Member of the Queensland Legislative Assembly for Logan
- In office 11 May 1935 – 15 April 1944
- Preceded by: Reginald King
- Succeeded by: Thomas Hiley

Personal details
- Born: John Innes Brown; Around 1881 Glasgow, Scotland
- Died: 3 December 1949 (aged 68) Brisbane, Queensland, Australia
- Party: Labor
- Spouse(s): Mary Ellen Thomson (m.1913 d.1927), Euphemia Macintosh Galloway Crockatt (m.1913 d.1984)
- Relations: Dick Brown (brother)
- Occupation: Blacksmith, Insurance inspector

John Innes Brown (c.1881 – 3 December 1949) was a blacksmith and member of the Queensland Legislative Assembly.

== Early days ==
Brown was born at Glasgow, Scotland, to John Brown, and his wife Janet (née Kidston). Arriving with his family in 1889, he attended South Brisbane State School before commencing work in the family business as a blacksmith at Coorparoo.

Brown was a founding member of the Thompson Estate Harriers Athletic Club in 1900, and the team he captained went on to represent Queensland in the first inter-state cross country championships in Sydney in 1905. In 1915 he was awarded life membership of the club.

== Political career ==
Brown entered politics in 1919 as an alderman on the Coorparoo Shire Council, rising to be its chairman. In 1928 he became an alderman on the Brisbane City Council, remaining there until 1936.

At the 1935 Queensland state election, Brown, representing the Labor, won the seat of Logan by convincingly defeating the long-serving member, Reginald King. He held the seat until the state election in 1944 when he was defeated by future Queensland Treasurer, Tom Hiley.

During his public life he was a member of the Victoria Bridge Board, the Electricity Board; the Water and Sewerage Board and the Brisbane Tramway Trust. He was also awarded life membership of the Queensland Amateur Athletics Club and was a founding member of the Coorparoo Bowls Club.

His brother, Dick Brown, also served in the Queensland Parliament, as the member for Buranda from 1935 until 1944.

== Personal life ==
On 13 August 1913, Brown married Mary Ellen Thomson (died 1927). He then married Euphemia Macintosh Galloway Crockatt (died 1984) on 27 July 1929.

After a long illness, Brown died 1949 and was cremated at Mount Thompson Crematorium.

Parliament of Queensland
Preceded by Reginald King	Member for Logan; 1935–1944	Succeeded by Thomas Hiley
