= National Party (Queensland, 1917) =

- Leader: James Tolmie (1917-1918); Edward Macartney (1918–1920); William Vowles (1920); Walter Barnes (1920–1921); Charles Taylor (1921–1924); Reginald King (1924–1925); Charles Taylor (1925)
- Founded: 1917
- Dissolved: 1925
- Merger of: Liberal Party; Country Party
- Merged into: Country and Progressive National Party
- Ideology: Nationalism; Liberal conservatism
- Political position: Centre-right

The National Party, known as the United Party from 1923, was a political party in the Australian state of Queensland from 1917 to 1925. Although allied with the federal Nationalist Party, it had different origins in state politics. It sought to combine the state's Liberal Party with the Country Party but the latter soon withdrew. In 1923 the party sought a further unification with the Country Party but only attracted a few recruits. Then in 1925 it merged with the Country Party, initially as the Country Progressive Party with a few members left out and then they were absorbed into the renamed Country and Progressive National Party.

== History ==
As early as January 1916 the various groups opposed to the state Labor government began exploring forming an umbrella extra-parliamentary organisation to co-ordinate activities. On 29 March that year the formation of the National Political Council was announced. At the end of May the Queensland Farmers' Union, sponsors of the Country Party, agreed to affiliate. In Queensland the Australian Labor Party split of 1916 had only a minor impact with Premier T. J. Ryan working hard to successfully keep the party together in the state with only limited losses. Instead the focus remained entirely on the multiple opposition groups. By the end of the year there were growing demands for the formation of a dedicated party on the same lines. Calls grew following the 1917 federal election and on 16 June 1917 a joint conference of delegates from the state Liberal Association and the federal National Federation called for unity as the "National Party". On 6 July the first meeting of the National Party was held. The sitting Liberal leader, James Tolmie, became the leader of the new party. At the National Political Council's annual meeting in August a resolution was passed calling for all its affiliates to work together as a National party. In the run-up to the 1918 state election the Country Party joined under the National Party banner.

Before the election Tolmie stood down due to illness and was succeeded by Edward Macartney. The election was a disappointment, with the National Party winning four fewer seats than its predecessors combined. In the state parliament the party held together for the time being, but there was much disruption amongst the extra-parliamentary forces, starting when the Queensland Farmers' Union withdrew from the National Political Council. Macartney also left the National Political Council and formed the more hardline Australian Democratic Union, which soon overcame its rival and the following the year the two merged as the National Democratic Council. A separate party, the Northern Country Party, also emerged as a regional division with the Nationalists. Suffering ill health, Macartney stood down in 1920 to be succeeded by William Vowles. After six months, Vowles led the majority of National MLAs into a reformed Country Party. Walter Barnes, the deputy leader, became the new leader. The National Party, Country Party, Northern Country Party and National Labor Party all co-operated in the 1920 state election but were unable to dislodge Labor. In June 1921 Charles Taylor succeeded Barnes as leader.

Another attempt at unity was made and in January 1923 a convention was held which changed the name to the Queensland United Party, but only four sitting Country MLAs and two of the Northern Country MLAs joined. The leadership was offered to various figures including First World War officer and federal Senator Major General Sir William Glasgow and William Green, the leader of the Northern Country Party, but ultimately Taylor was retained. Further efforts were made in April 1924 when the United and Country parliamentary parties agreed to form a joint Opposition, headed by Arthur Edward Moore. Taylor resigned as leader at the end of the year, to be succeeded by Reginald King.

In May 1925 the bulk of the party merged with the Country Party to form the Country Progressive Party; but four United MLAs (Taylor, Walter Barnes, George Barnes and William Kelso) were excluded from the merger due to their standing opposition to arrangements for joint fundraising for the parties. They opted to carry on as a rump United Party. However the successful co-operation of the federal Nationalist-Country Coalition in the 1925 federal election renewed interest in a merger and the following month the rump merged in, having secured a party name change to Country and Progressive National Party.

The party also contested Brisbane City Council, with William Jolly becoming the first Lord Mayor of Brisbane at the elections when the city was expanded in 1925. Following the state merger, the Brisbane City party continued to contest elections as the Nationalist Civic Party. Jolly was briefly followed by Archibald Watson but following the latter's defeat in the 1931 election the party subsequently merged into the Citizens' Municipal Organisation.

== Leaders ==
Leader	Date started	Date finished
James Tolmie	6 July 1917	15 February 1918
Edward Macartney	15 February 1918	28 January 1920
William Vowles	28 January 1920	28 July 1920
Walter Barnes	28 July 1920	7 June 1921
Charles Taylor	7 June 1921	26 January 1923
(Renamed to United Party)		
Charles Taylor	26 January 1923	18 December 1924
Reginald King	18 December 1924	12 May 1925
(Majority merges into Country Progressive Party		
Rump: Charles Taylor	12 May 1925	15 December 1925
(Rump merges into Country and Progressive National Party		

== Election results ==
Election	Leader	Votes	%	Seats	+/–	Position	Government
1918	Edward Macartney	150,225	44.62	22 / 72	▲1	▲2nd	Opposition
1920	Walter Barnes	90,730	25.73	13 / 72	▼9	▼2nd	Opposition
1923	Charles Taylor	131,810	36.12	16 / 72	▲3	▲2nd	Opposition

== See also ==
- Category:National Party (Queensland, 1917) members of the Parliament of Queensland

== Bibliography ==
- Evans, Raymond (1987). Loyalty and Disloyalty: Social Conflict on the Queensland Homefront, 1914-18. Allen & Unwin. ISBN 9780049940062.
- Fitzgerald, Ross (1984). From 1915 to the Early 1980s: A History of Queensland. University of Queensland Press. ISBN 9780702217340.
- Hughes, Colin A. (1980). The Government of Queensland. University of Queensland Press. ISBN 978-0702215155.
