= McDowall, Queensland =

McDowall
- Suburb
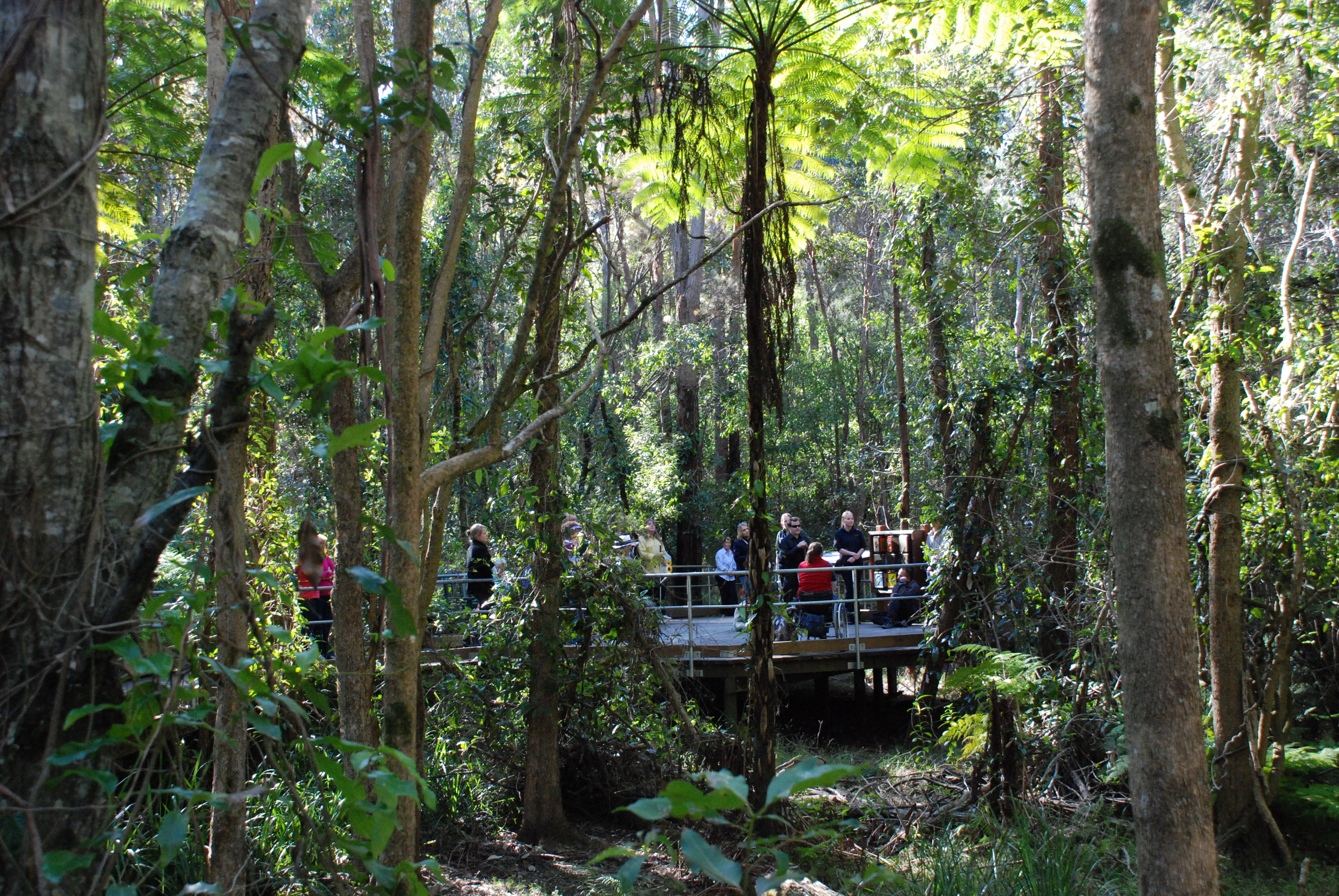

- Interactive map of McDowall
- Coordinates: 27.3788°S 152.9938°E
- Country: Australia
- State: Queensland
- City: Brisbane
- LGA: City of Brisbane (McDowall Ward)
- Location: 12.8 km (8.0 mi) NNW of Brisbane CBD

Government
  - State electorates: Aspley; Everton; Stafford
  - Federal divisions: Dickson; Lilley

Area
  - Total: 4.2 km^{2} (1.6 sq mi)

Population
  - Total: 7,612 (2021 census)
  - Density: 1,812/km^{2} (4,690/sq mi)
- Time zone: UTC+10:00 (AEST)
- Postcode: 4053
Suburbs around McDowall
Albany Creek	Bridgeman Downs	Aspley
Bunya	McDowall	Chermside West
Everton Hills	Everton Park	Stafford Heights

McDowall (/məkˈdaʊl/ mək-DOWL) is a northern suburb in the City of Brisbane, Queensland, Australia. In the 2021 census, McDowall had a population of 7,612 people.

== Geography ==
McDowall is 12.8 kilometres (8.0 mi) by road from the Brisbane CBD.

== History ==
McDowall State School was opened on 28 January 1975 with 36 students and six teachers. The school was named before the suburb was named. The school was named in honour of Colonel John McDowall, who was a distinguished early-settler of the area. As the population grew, the Brisbane City Council considered naming the suburb Annand after Colonel Frederick Annand. This was disapproved of by local residents, who wanted the suburb to be named after the newly-opened school. The name McDowall was therefore accepted for the area by the Place Names Board of Queensland in 1975.

== Demographics ==
In the 2011 census, the population of McDowall was 6,818, 51.2% female and 48.8% male. The median age of the Mcdowall population was 38 years of age, 1 year above the Australian median. 78.5% of people living in Mcdowall were born in Australia, compared to the national average of 69.8%; the next most common countries of birth were England 3.3%, New Zealand 2.6%, South Africa 1.5%, Italy 1.3%, India 1.1%. 87.1% of people spoke only English at home; the next most common languages were 2.9% Italian, 1.3% Cantonese, 1% Mandarin, 0.5% Greek, 0.4% Hindi.

In the 2016 census, McDowall had a population of 7,237 people.

In the 2021 census, McDowall had a population of 7,612 people.

== Education ==
McDowall State School is a government primary (Prep-6) school for boys and girls at 1018 Rode Road (27.3880°S 152.9900°E). In 2018 , the school had an enrolment of 997 students with 64 teachers (57.6 full-time equivalent) and 34 non-teaching staff (24.4 full-time equivalent). It includes a special education program.

There are no government secondary schools in McDowall. The nearest government secondary schools are Craigslea State High School in neighbouring Chermside West to the east, Everton Park State High School in neighbouring Everton Park to the south, and Albany Creek State High School in neighbouring Albany Creek to the north-west.

== Amenities ==
McDowall Village shopping centre is located at 109 Beckett Road (corner of Hamilton Road, 27.3802°S 152.9895°E). It is anchored by Drakes Supermarket.

== Transport ==
A number of bus services also travel through the area (namely, the 350, 351, 352, 353 and 598 / 599 Great Circle Line and a number of school bus routes) going to local shopping centres such as Chermside, Aspley, and Brisbane City.
