= Chermside, Queensland =

Suburb of Brisbane, Queensland, Australia

Chermside
- Suburb
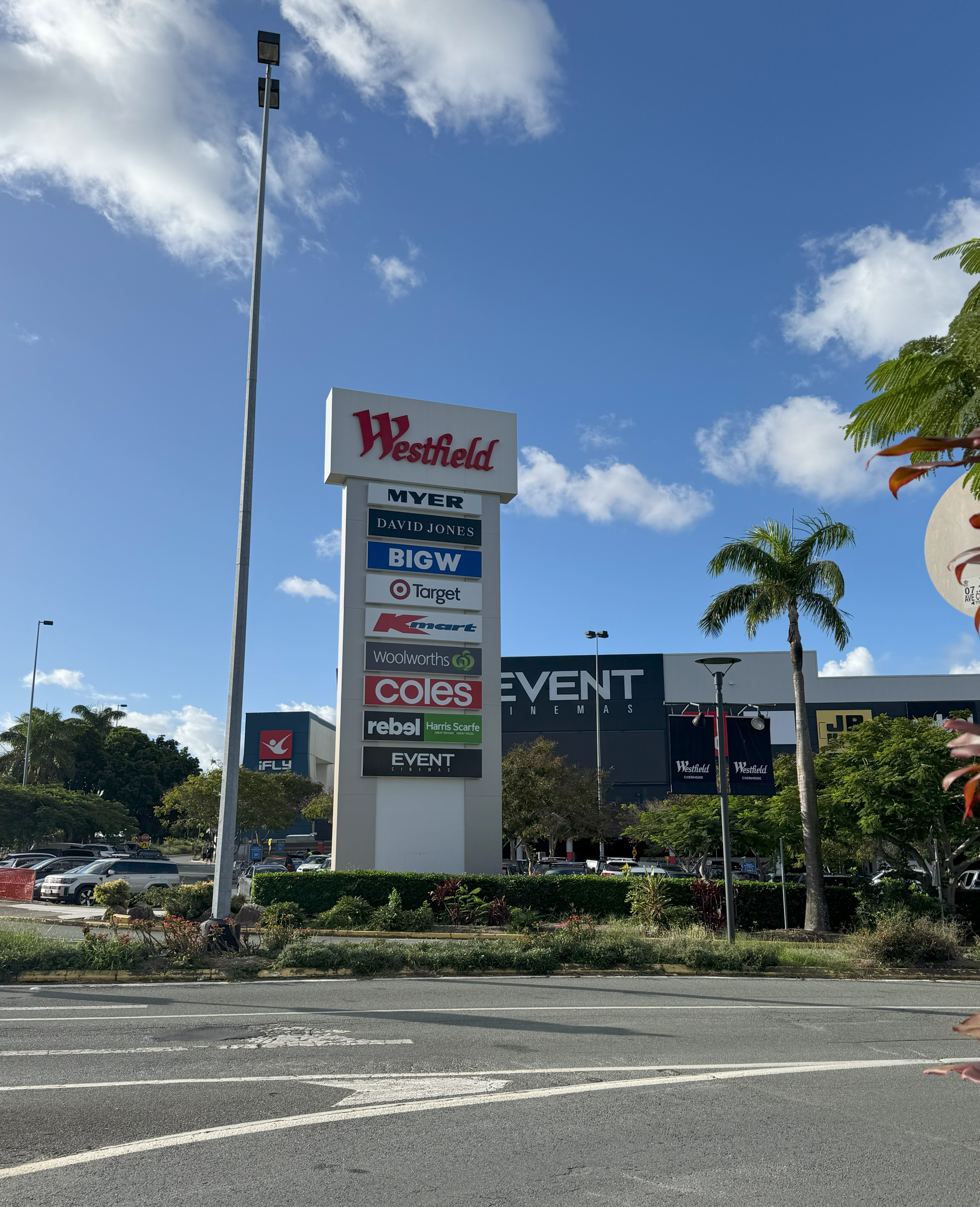
- Westfield Chermside

- Interactive map of Chermside
- Coordinates: 27.3831°S 153.0357°E
- Country: Australia
- State: Queensland
- City: Brisbane
- LGA: City of Brisbane (Marchant Ward and Northgate Ward)
- Location: 9.8 km (6.1 mi) N of Brisbane CBD

Government
  - State electorates: Stafford; Nudgee
  - Federal division: Lilley

Area
  - Total: 4.0 km^{2} (1.5 sq mi)
- Elevation: 25 m (82 ft)

Population
  - Total: 11,426 (2021 census)
  - Density: 2,860/km^{2} (7,400/sq mi)
- Time zone: UTC+10:00 (AEST)
- Postcode: 4032
Suburbs around Chermside
Aspley	Aspley	Geebung
Chermside West	Chermside	Wavell Heights
Stafford	Kedron	Wavell Heights

Chermside is a suburb in the City of Brisbane, Queensland, Australia. The suburb is situated 9.8 kilometres (6.1 mi) by road north of the Brisbane CBD. It is home to a large Westfield shopping centre. In the 2021 census, Chermside had a population of 11,426 people.

== Geography ==
Chermside is a key destination along Queensland Transport's future Northern Busway, and home to Westfield Chermside, the second largest Westfield shopping centre in Australia, with a three-storey Myer and a 16 screen cinema complex.

== History ==
The Chermside area was first settled by Europeans in the late 19th century. The first plot of land was sold on 23 May 1866, and the population has progressively increased since with a significant increase with the post-war residential development.

When the Gympie goldrush started in 1867, many travellers heading north would run into trouble at a creek in present-day Chermside. Because of this waterway, Chermside was first known as Downfall Creek.

In November 1868, Cobb & Co. stagecoaches began to travel through the area on the way to the goldfields at Gympie.

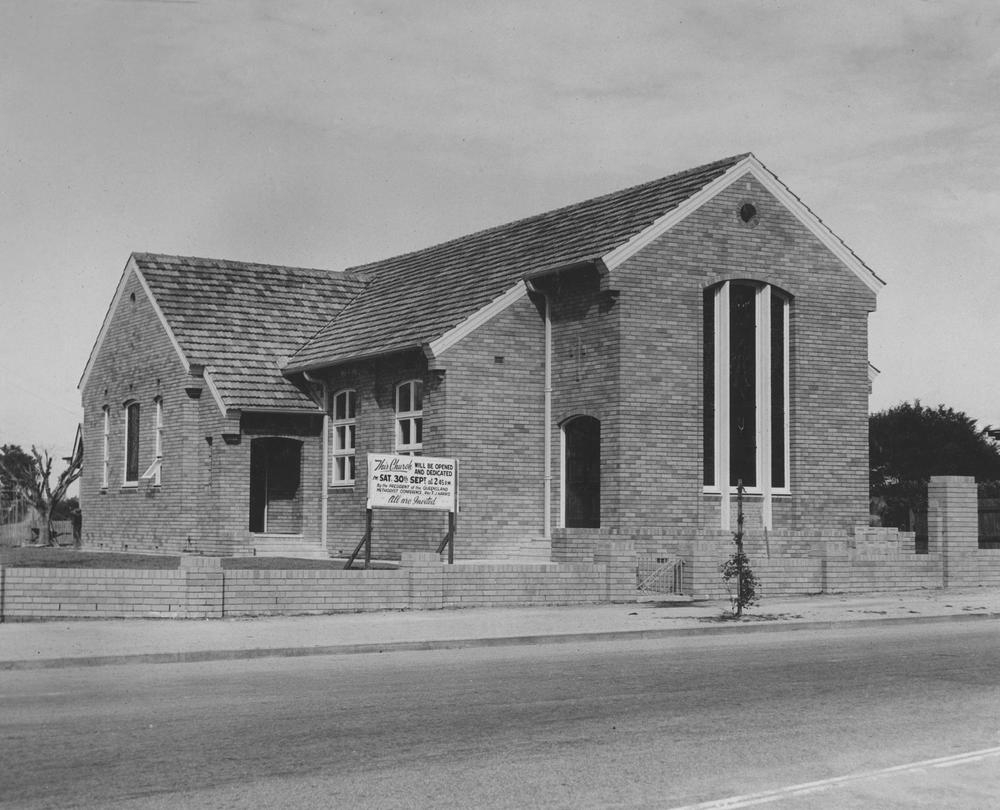
Chermside Methodist Church, 1950

A United Methodist Free church opened on Sunday 11 August 1878 on the corner of Gympie Road and Banfield Street, (then Church Street, approx 27.3818°S 153.0230°E). In 1926, a more central site was purchased on the south-east corner of Gympie Road and Hamilton Road and the church building was relocated to the new site and renovated. It was replaced by a brick church which opened on 30 September 1950. It became part of the Uniting Church in 1977. This brick church was demolished in 2004, probably because the current Chermside-Kedron Community Church (a Uniting Church) in Chermside on the north-western corner of Gympie Road and Rode Road had opened on 23 September 2001.

Downfall Creek State School opened on 9 July 1900. In 1903, it was renamed Chermside State School. It closed in December 1996. It was on the north-western corner of the intersection of Gympie Road and Rode Road (27.3930°S 153.0306°E).

In 1904, the district's name was changed to Chermside after the Governor of Queensland, Sir Herbert Chermside.

Regular Anglican services commenced circa 1906 in the public hall (School of Arts) on the corner of Gympie Road and Hall Street. In January 1913, land was purchased in Hamilton Road to build an Anglican church. A stump-capping ceremony was held on St James' Day 25 July 1914. The first service was held on 11 October 1914. The official dedication of All Saints Anglican Church by Archbishop St Clair Donaldson was held on 15 November 1914. The foundation stone of the present church building was laid by Archbishop Reginald Halse on Sunday 11 December 1960. The church was extended in 1996.

Chermside has had a library since 1909. Since 1951, it has been a branch of the Brisbane City Council Library service and had a major refurbishment in 2017.

In December 1925, "Rainey's Hill Top Park" made up of 99 allotments were advertised to be auctioned by Thonton's & Pearce, Auctioneers. A map advertising the auction states that this estate is "close to tram, motor bus, water and electric light".

The Dawn picture theatre first opened on 3 November 1928 (showing The Man Who Laughs). It closed on 9 August 2005 (with Mr. & Mrs. Smith). It was at 708 Gympie Road (27.3889°S 153.0309°E), now the site of the North Brisbane Eye Centre. It was the last single screen cinema in Brisbane.

The Sanctuary in the Wheller Gardens retirement village, named for Harold M. Wheller, was dedicated on 5 March 1940 by Reverend Wilfred Leonard Slater, the President of the Methodist Conference.

During World War II, a diverse range of volunteers, soldiers, and camps were at Chermside, such as U.S. Army units, including a number of African American soldiers. A Kitty Hawk airplane on a training flight crashed there in 1943, killing the pilot and instructor.

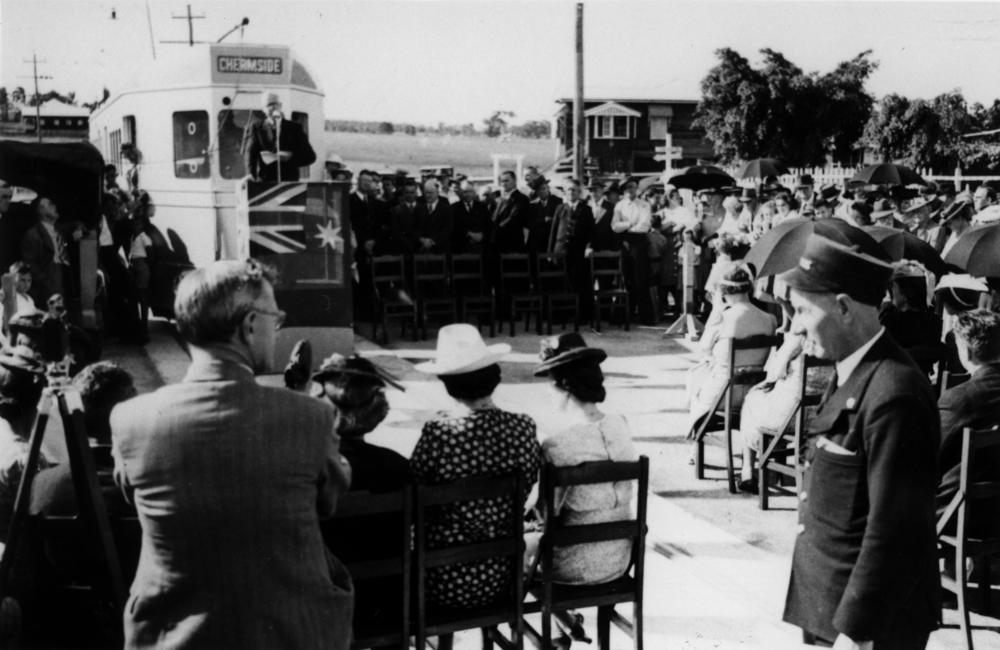
The opening of the Chermside tram line in 1947. The open field behind the tram is the site of the Chermside drive-in shopping centre

Brisbane's tramway network finally reached the suburb on 29 March 1947, and Chermside remained the northernmost point on the system until the line to Chermside was closed on 2 December 1968. The tram line along Gympie Road was separated from other traffic (this is commonly called "reserved track"), which resulted in fast travel times along this portion of the route. Another feature of the Chermside tram line were the rose gardens which bordered the reserved track portion of the line.

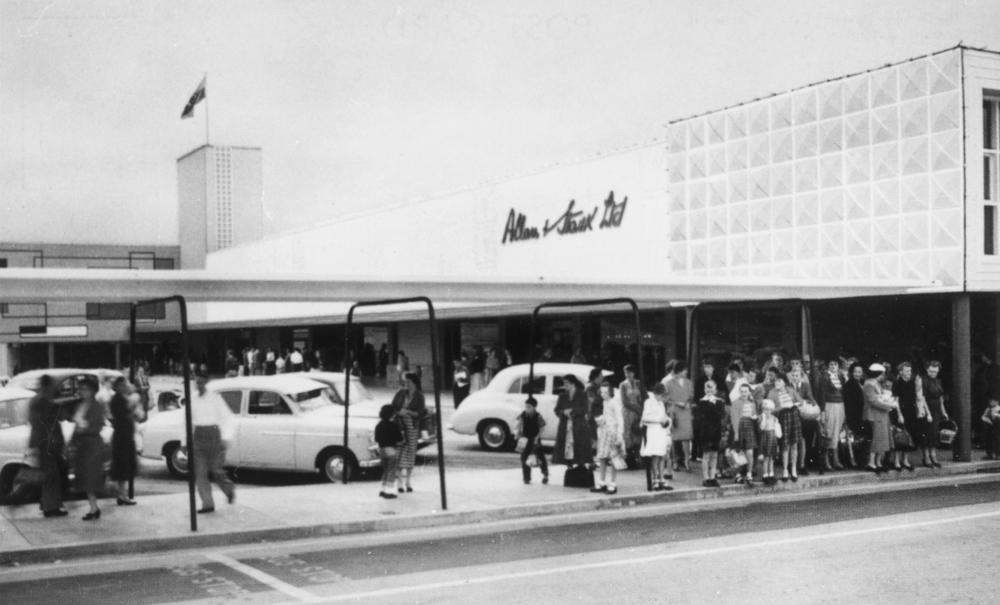
Bus terminal at Drive-In Shopping Centre, Chermside, ca. 1957

Westfield Chermside first opened on 30 May 1957 as The Chermside Drive-in Shopping Centre with an Allan & Stark's department store and a small arcade of a dozen shops, before becoming a Myer department store. It was the first drive-in shopping centre in Australia. It was the first drive-in shopping centre in Australia. It is now the largest single level shopping centre in Australia, with a 3-storey Myer, as well as a 16-screen Birch, Carrol and Coyle megaplex. It is also home to Brisbane's first Apple Store.

St Thomas' Anglican Church in Chermside East (now Wavell Heights) was dedicated on 13 October 1957 by Archbishop Reginald Halse. Its closure on 21 December 1990 was approved by Assistant Bishop George Browning. Its deconsecration was authorised by Archbishop Peter Hollingworth.

The Prince Charles Hospital (a public hospital) was opened in 1959.

The Brisbane Chest Hospital was opened in 1954 for the treatment of tuberculosis. As tuberculosis declined, it was renamed The Chermside Hospital in 1961 to reflect its more general healthcare role. Prince Charles visited Brisbane in 1974 and the hospital was renamed The Prince Charles Hospital in his honour.

St Laurence's Anglican Church in Chermside West was dedicated on 26 February 1966 by Archbishop Philip Strong. It has since closed.

The early 1970s saw the opening of Queensland's first Kmart store in Chermside, which was situated next to a Coles supermarket. Both of these stores closed in the mid-1990s and have been replaced with a Woolworths supermarket and specialty stores. Both Kmart and Coles have been relocated in Westfield Chermside.

Craigslea State School opened 24 January 1972 and the neighbouring Craigslea State High School opened on 28 January 1975. Both are now within Chermside West.

In 1975, the area known as Chermside West was established as a separate suburb.

Prince Charles Hospital Special School closed on 30 December 1983.

The Burnie Brae Centre (also known as Chermside Senior Citizens Centre) opened in 1984, from funds raised by the Rotary Club of Chermside. It was named for the Burnie Brae Homestead that had originally occupied the site.

Holy Spirit Northside Private Hospital opened 30 July 2001; it was operated by the Sisters of Charity and the Holy Spirit Missionary Sisters. In September 2019 it was renamed St Vincent's Private Hospital Northside.

In 2022, the Queensland Family History Society relocated from Gaythorne to Chermside.

== Demographics ==
In the 2011 census, Chermside recorded a population of 8,170 people, with 53.2% female and 46.8% male. The median age of the Chermside population was 35 years of age, 2 years below the Australian median. 59.5% of people living in Chermside were born in Australia, compared to the national average of 69.8%; the next most common countries of birth were India 4%, New Zealand 3.8%, Philippines 2.7%, England 2.6%, China 1.5%. 67.9% of people spoke only English at home; the next most popular languages were 1.7% Malayalam,1.5% Tagalog, 1.3% Italian, 1.3% Mandarin, 0.9% Korean.

In the 2016 census, Chermside had a population of 9,315 people. It was described in that year as one of Brisbane's fastest developing suburbs.

In the 2021 census, Chermside had a population of 11,426 people.

== Heritage listings ==
There are a number of heritage-listed sites in Chermside:

- Chermside School Building (former) & Arbor Day trees, 590 Gympie Road (27.3924°S 153.0301°E)
- H.M. Wheller Garden Settlement, 930 Gympie Road (27.3822°S 153.0280°E)
- Vellnagel's Blacksmith Shops, 992 Gympie Road (27.3792°S 153.0290°E)
- Chermside Historical Precinct, 61 Kittyhawk Drive (27.3823°S 153.0354°E)
- Chermside Telephone Exchange, 9 Mermaid Street (27.3920°S 153.0318°E)
- Chermside Chest Clinic (former) boiler house chimney, 627 Rode Road (27.3896°S 153.0220°E)

== Education ==
There are no schools in Chermside. The nearest government primary schools are Wavell Heights State School in neighbouring Wavell Heights to the east, Craigslea State School in neighbouring Chermside West to the west, Geebung State School in neighbouring Geebung to the north-east, and Somerset Hills State School in neighbouring Stafford Heights to the south-west. The nearest government secondary schools are Wavell State High School in neighbouring Wavell Heights to the south-east and Craigslea State High School in neighbouring Chermside West to the west.

== Facilities ==
Chermside Police Beat Shopfront is within the Westfield Shoppingtown (27.3838°S 153.0310°E).

Chermside Fire Station is at 526 Hamilton Road (27.3851°S 153.0236°E).

Chermside Ambulance Station is at 520 Hamilton Road, adjacent to the fire station (27.3853°S 153.0241°E).

There are a number of hospitals in Chermside:

- The Prince Charles Hospital, 627 Rode Road (27.3892°S 153.0232°E), a public hospital
- St Vincent's Private Hospital Northside (27.3910°S 153.0236°E), a private hospital
- Icon Cancer Care Chermside (27.3818°S 153.0292°E), a private clinic for day patients
- Chermside Dialysis Clinic (27.3910°S 153.0316°E), a private clinic for day patients.
- Chermside Day Hospital (27.3820°S 153.0293°E), a private hospital for day patients
- Hummingbird House (27.3831°S 153.0277°E), a private hospice for children
- Brisbane North Eye Centre at 708 Gympie Road (27.3889°S 153.0309°E), a private clinic for eye surgery

There are two medical centres in Chermside:

- SmartClinics Chermside Family Medical centre Shop/212 Gympie Road.
- Chermside Medical Centre Unit 2, 956 Gympie Road Chermside 4032.

There are a number of radiology centres in Chermside:

- Red Radiology 243 Hamilton Rd, Chermside 4032
- I-MED Radiology Chermside. Chermside Medical Complex, Suite 6, 956 Gympie Rd, Chermside, 4032
- Queensland Radiology Specialists. 621 Gympie Rd, Chermside QLD 4032

Wheller Gardens is a retirement village (27.3828°S 153.0296°E).

== Amenities ==
=== Shopping centres ===
There are a number of shopping centres in the Chermside:

- Westfield Chermside, situated at the north-east corner of Gympie Road and Hamilton Road, is one of the largest shopping centres in Australia, featuring over 480 stores, a cinema complex, dining precincts, and extensive parking facilities. (27.3829°S 153.0328°E)
- Chermside Markets shopping centre at 725 Webster Road (27.3759°S 153.0249°E)
- Chermside Place shopping centre at 725 Gympie Road (27.3904°S 153.0317°E)

=== Churches ===
All Saints Anglican Church is at 501 Hamilton Road (27.3852°S 153.0281°E).

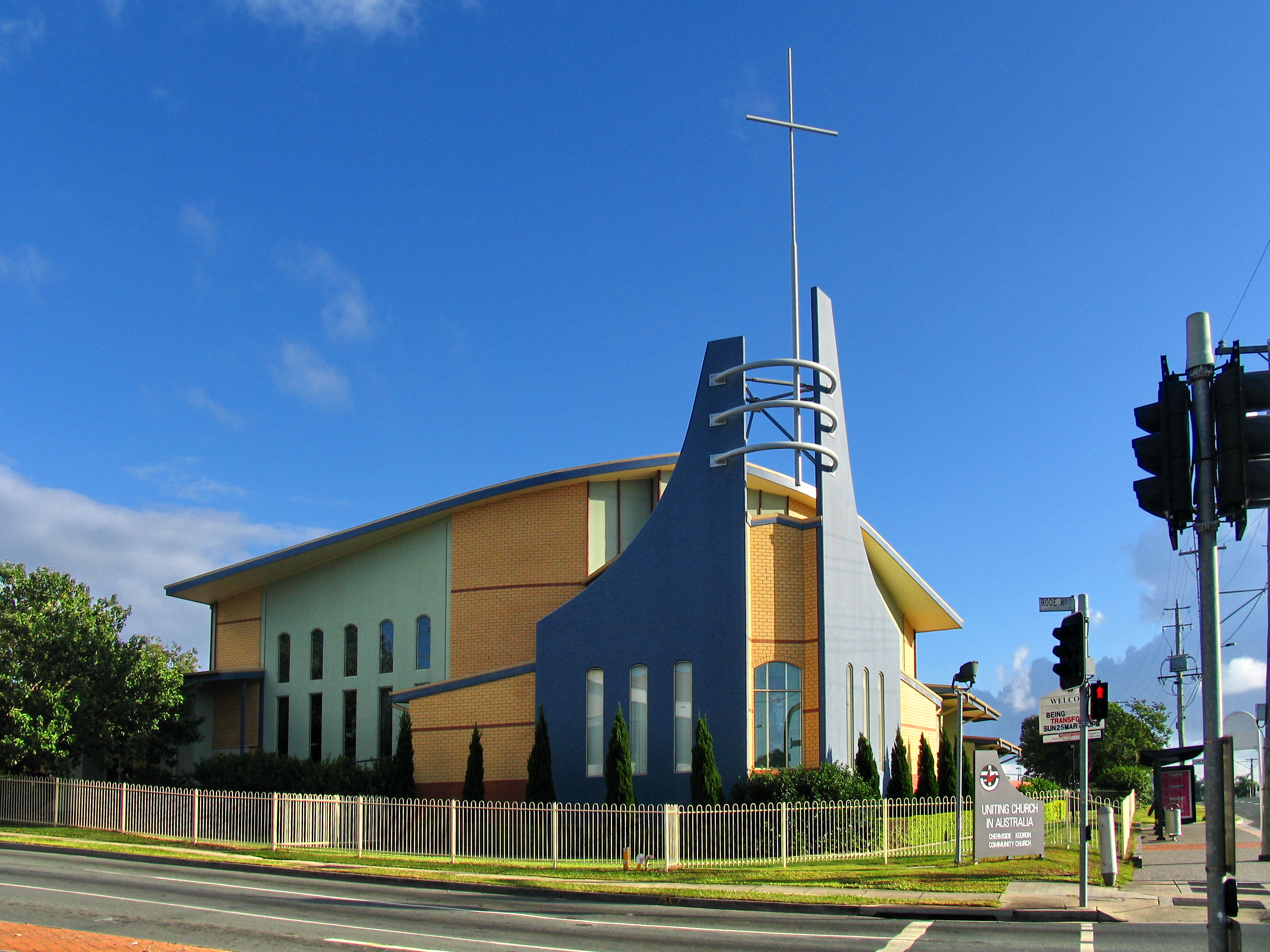
Chermside Kedron Community Church, 2007

Chermside Kedron Community Church is at 590 Gympie Road (corner of Rode Road, 27.3929°S 153.0305°E) on the site of the former Chermside State School. It is part of the Uniting Church in Australia.

The Sanctuary is at 930 Gympie Road (27.3831°S 153.0287°E). It is with the grounds of the Wheller Gardens retirement village and is part of the Uniting Church in Australia.

The Church of Jesus Christ of the Latter Day Saints is at 391 Rode Road (27.3936°S 153.0335°E).

Centrepoint Church (formerly Chermside Assembly of God) is at 240 Hamilton Road (27.3880°S 153.0433°E). It is part of the Australian Christian Churches network.

=== Sporting facilities ===
- Chermside Bowls Club at 468 Rode Road (27.3938°S 153.0286°E)
- Shawsportz sports centre in Burringar Park (27.3861°S 153.0351°E)
- Chermside Aquatic Centre & Water Park at 375 Hamilton Road (27.3857°S 153.0360°E)

=== Parks ===
There are a number of parks including:

- 7th Brigade Park (named in honour of the Australian 7th Brigade) at 375 Hamilton Road, which contains numerous facilities, such as the library and the aquatic centre at the Hamilton Road end and then extends northward with sporting fields and green space around Downfall Creek (27.3797°S 153.0377°E)
- Burnie Brae Park (also known as Annand Park) at 106 Meemar Street (27.3894°S 153.0353°E), including the Burnie Brae Centre (also known as Chermside Senior Citizens Centre)
- Dead Man's Gully Park at 5 Abarth Street (27.3903°S 153.0308°E)
- John Patterson Park (also known as Kidston Park) at 57 Norman Drive (27.3882°S 153.0281°E)
- Packer Place (including Terry Hampson Reserve) at 25 The Boulevard (27.3801°S 153.0275°E)

=== Other amenities ===
The Brisbane City Council operates a public library at 375 Hamilton Road (corner of Kittyhawk Drive, 27.3861°S 153.0351°E).

The Queensland Family History Society operates a library at 46 Delaware Street within 7th Brigade Park (27.3780°S 153.0418°E).

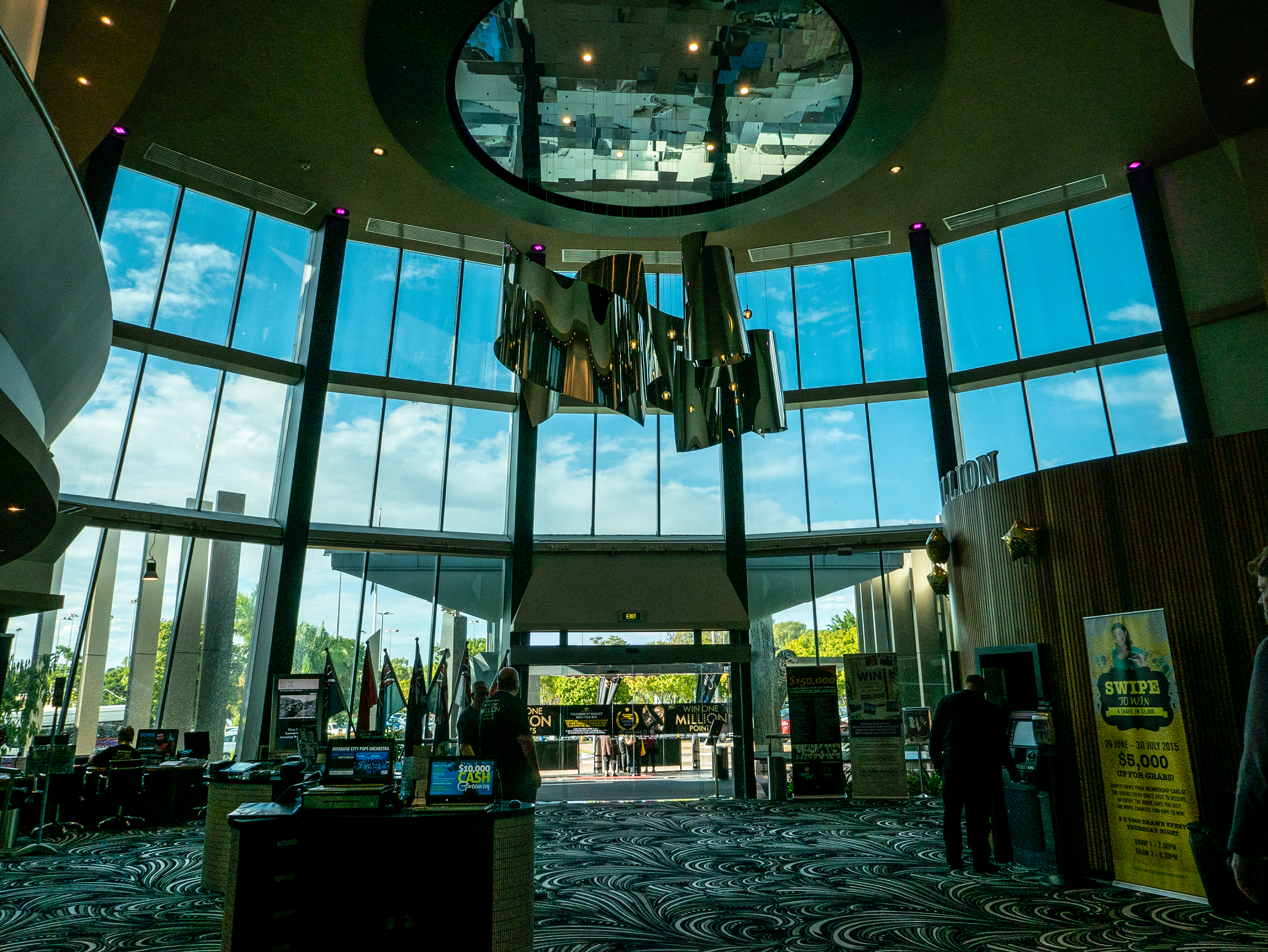
Kedron Wavell RSL entrance, 2015

Kedron Wavell Services Club is at 21 Kittyhawk Drive. It offers dining, bars, and entertainment. It is operated by the Kedron Wavell RSL sub-branch and has over 60,000 members. As a not-for-profit organisation, surplus funds are used to fund community projects.

The Burnie Brae Centre (also known as Chermside Senior Citizens Centre) is at 60 Kuran Street (27.3899°S 153.0342°E).

== Attractions ==
The Chermside Historical Precinct is at 61 Kittyhawk Drive. It consists of three buildings:

- the original Chermside State School building, built in 1900 and relocated to the site circa 1997 and now home to the Chermside & Districts Historical Society
- the Sandgate Drill Hall, built in 1915 and relocated to the site in 2000 and now home to the Milne Bay Memorial Library and Research Centre
- Training Ship Voyager Centre Sea Scouts' hall (built circa 1964), now used as a community craft centre

== Transport ==
Chermside is home to the Chermside bus station, a major public transport hub located adjacent to Westfield Chermside. It is serviced by numerous Translink bus routes that provide frequent connections to the Brisbane CBD, surrounding suburbs, and key destinations such as hospitals, universities, and train stations. The bus station features dedicated platforms, real-time service information, and accessibility facilities, making it a vital component of Brisbane’s northern transport network. The Northern Busway between the Royal Children's Hospital and Windsor was completed in August 2009, and an extra 3 kilometres (1.9 mi) of busway between Windsor and Kedron opened in June 2012 with Airport Link and 2 new busway stations at Lutwyche and Kedron. Planning for the ultimate Northern Busway between Kedron and Bracken Ridge (including Chermside) is being revised with stages subject to funding and government priority.

A dedicated bus lane, operating both inbound and outbound, was added in 2024 along Gympie Road between Kedron and Chermside, benefiting over 5,000 commuters during peak periods each weekday.
