= 2nd Pioneer Battalion =

2nd Pioneer Battalion may refer to:

- 2nd Pioneer Battalion (Australia): a unit of the Australian Army that served during the First World War
- 2/2nd Pioneer Battalion (Australia): a unit of the Australian Army that served during the Second World War
- 2nd Combat Engineer Battalion: a United States Marine Corps unit, which was originally designated as the 2nd Pioneer Battalion
