= Stafford State School =

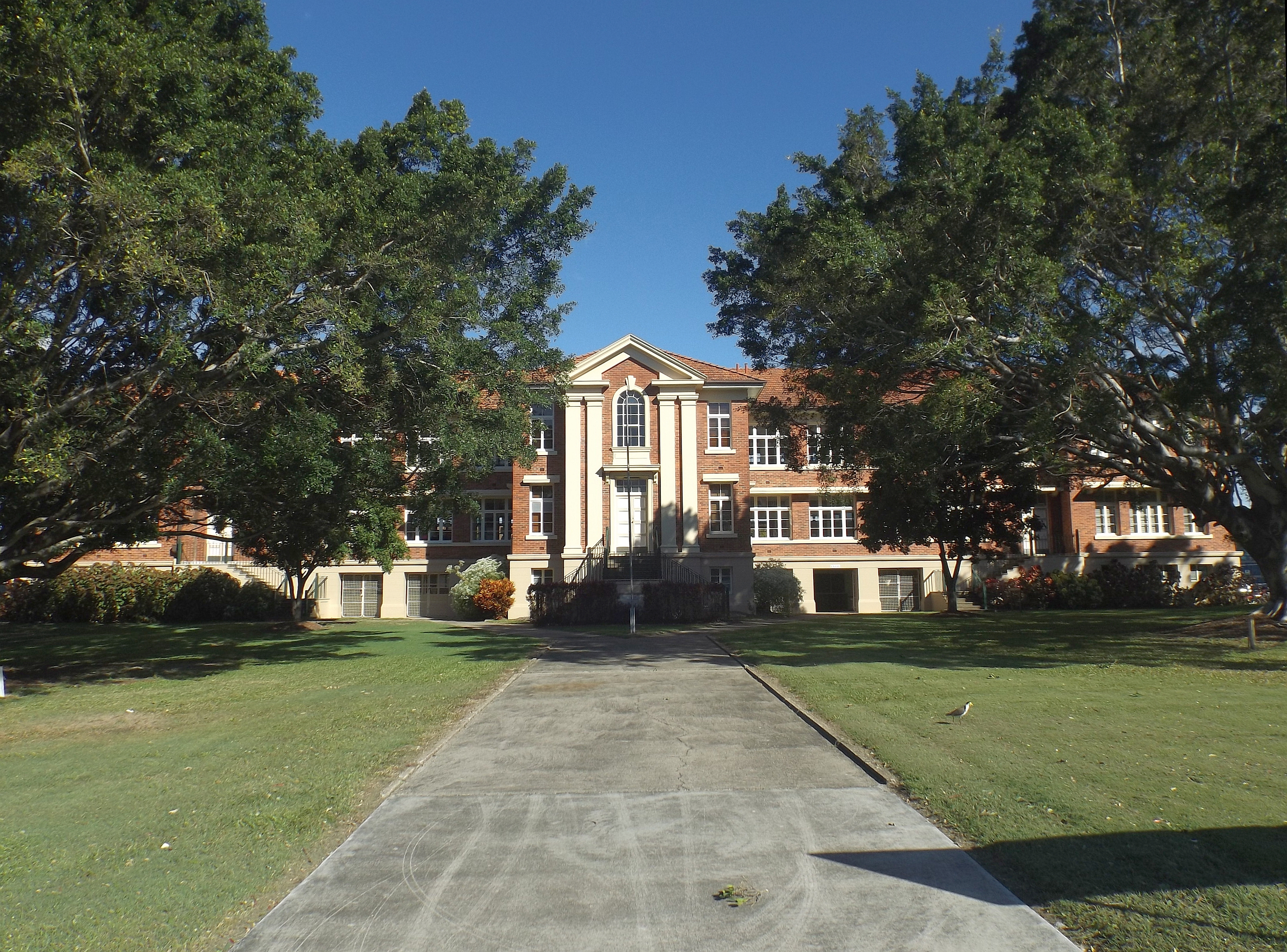
- Stafford Road entrance, 2015

- Location within Queensland Location within Australia
- 27.4114°S 153.0178°E
- Location: 314 Stafford Road, Stafford, City of Brisbane, Queensland, Australia

History
- Design period: 1940s–1960s (post-World War II)
- Built: 1948–1955

Site notes
- Architect: Queensland Department of Public Works
- Architectural style: Classicism

Queensland Heritage Register
- Official name: Stafford State School
- Type: state heritage (built)
- Designated: 26 February 1999
- Reference no.: 601667
- Significant period: 1940s (historical); 1940s–1950s (fabric); 1948 ongoing (social)
- Significant components: school/school room

Stafford State School is a heritage-listed state school at 314 Stafford Road, Stafford, City of Brisbane, Queensland, Australia. It was designed by the Queensland Department of Public Works and built from 1948 to 1955. It was added to the Queensland Heritage Register on 26 February 1999.

== History ==
Stafford State School is a substantial three-storey brick building located on a 5.138-hectare (12.70-acre) site on the corner of Stafford and Webster Roads, facing Stafford Road. It was constructed in 1948–49 as the principal building of Stafford State School, providing primary education to children of the Stafford district. Stafford State School also incorporates formal gardens in the foreground of the school and large open playing fields to the rear of the building, established at the same time as the principal school building.

Stafford's original name was Happy Valley until 1886, when a government administrator questioned whether such a name was dignified enough to grace a new school. It is one of the few places in Queensland which takes its suburban name from the school. Happy Valley incorporated the suburbs now known as Everton Park and Stafford, and remained a semi-rural area well into the twentieth century. Local industry included tanneries, fellmongers and dairy farms. In 1886, a simple timber school building and teacher's residence were constructed on the original Collier Street site. This site later became Stafford State Pre-school.

In 1940 the tramline from Red Hill was extended to Stafford Road. Closer settlement was encouraged with the establishment of a housing commission estate during World War Two on the eastern side of Webster Road and the Somerset Hill subdivision was established after the war. The general changes in post war Australian society felt through the return of service personnel, a baby boom and an influx of immigrants from Europe coincides with these infrastructural planning changes for the area.

In 1947, a 12-acre site was purchased for the new school from John Smith. During the second world war, substantial changes were made to the incorporation of physical education into the primary curriculum. Specialised physical education teacher training had commenced in Queensland in 1941 with the first batch of graduates employed under the Organiser of Physical Education in 1944. In 1944, the Director General of Education called for the "enlarging of existing school grounds or acquisition of new sites" to accommodate facilities for field games. At this time organised games revolving around fair play and emphasising teamwork were included as part of the broader themes of educational philosophy. In order to accommodate such changes, the Department of Public Instruction began to purchase sites which allowed adequate space to be dedicated to physical education. Stafford State School had two full playing ovals accommodating football, cricket, basketball, vigaro, hockey and athletics, with a swimming pool and grandstand complex added later.

The building was designed by Frederick Thomas Wylie Warren of the Architectural Branch of the Queensland Department of Public Works and construction of the first stage was completed in 1948. A second stage was completed in 1955 from the original design. The form and architectural style of building is more typical of interwar brick school buildings, particularly those constructed under the Unemployment Relief Scheme. As such it was criticised in the contemporary press, by teachers and architects, as severe and barrack like, and representing an outmoded style of school building. From the 1950s a change in architectural direction for the Departments of Public Works and Public Instruction can be seen in the introduction of organic planning for state schools.

The school was constructed of brick and concrete. It contained 16 classrooms situated on the first and second floors. A head teacher's room; male and female teachers' rooms; library; reading room; store and medical inspection room; and hat and cloak rooms were also provided. Some of the classrooms on the first and second floor had folding partitions and a kindergarten room was included on the first floor. Toilets were located on the ground floor, with the remainder of ground floor space dedicated to play areas.

An infants school consisting of three buildings was excised from the original site in 1953, this set of buildings is now redundant and unoccupied. The infants school was reincorporated into the main school after the demand on school facilities decreased. The school buildings continues to house the primary school for this area, although students enrolled in the school has decreased in recent years.

== Description ==
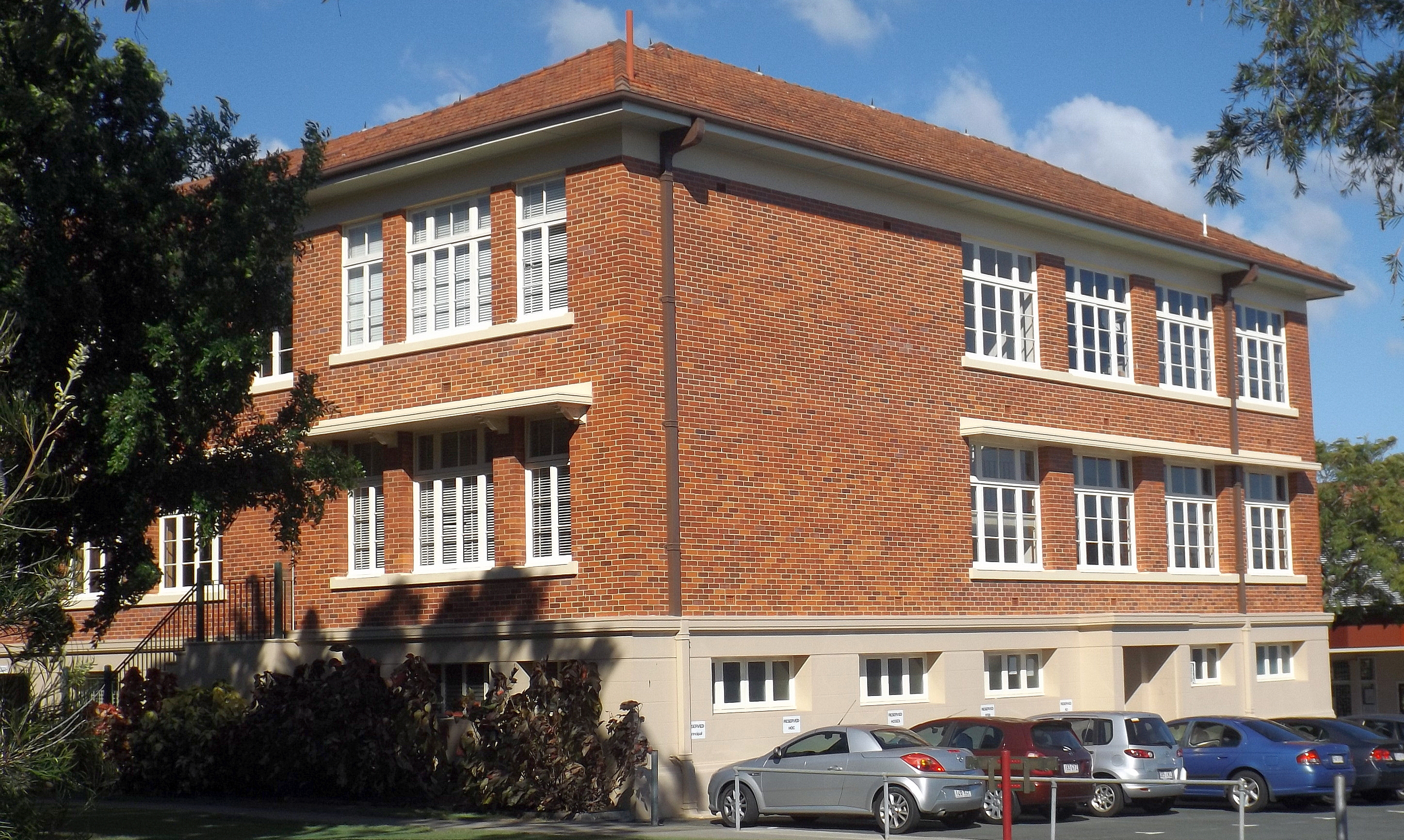
Webster Road view, 2015

Stafford State School is a substantial three storey brick building located on a 5.138-hectare (12.70-acre) site on the corner of Stafford and Webster Roads, facing Stafford Road. The site also includes substantial open spaces principally used as playing fields and located behind the complex of school buildings.

Stafford State School is a symmetrical U-shaped building, with a linear plan on an east–west axis. At the centre of the northern facade is the projecting bay of the main entry and near either end are two smaller breakfronts with secondary entries. The roof is hipped and clad in red ceramic tiles. The front or northern elevation also has two breakfronts near either end which mark the linear plan. The external walls of the two upper levels of the building are face brick with the classrooms indicated by grouped casement windows with awning lights above. The two upper levels sit on the rendered base of the ground floor, which has arcades and smaller window openings. The three-storey height, and Georgian-style symmetry, proportion and massing make the building prominent from both Stafford and Webster Roads.

The central bay of the northern facade is emphasised as the main entry to the building by the triangular pedimented gable, the rendered entry door surround, the double stairway and projecting further than the end bays. Also mounted over the main entrance is a large arched window with 16 panes. The first and second floors contain a series of classrooms opening onto a corridor running the length of the building on the northern side. There are panelled doors with toplights and double-hung windows between the classrooms and the corridor. The east and west wings each house two classrooms and former cloakrooms. The high ceilings, regular external windows and internal windows and doors provide substantial natural light and cross ventilation. The two stairways, near either end of the building, have steel balustrades, cast newels and timber handrails. A third stairway is located in the centre of the building. The central projecting bay houses a number of smaller rooms that are used as administrative offices and staff facilities. The tuckshop, girls and boys toilets and maintenance storage areas are located in the undercroft of the building.

The foreground of Stafford State School building is lawn, pathways and established plantings. To the west of the main building is the tennis courts. A second school building is located behind the main building and is a two-storeyed timber-and-corrugated-iron construction. Between the two buildings is bitumened parade ground that is marked for ball games and parade positions. Simple timber and iron covered walkways run between the two buildings and a covered eating area is located to the east of the two buildings.

Behind the building complex is a vegetated lot which includes a number of native plants enclosing smaller lawned areas with timber benches. A sign marks the area as Centenary Grove. The playing fields are located behind the Centenary Grove and consist of large levelled and lawned area, incorporating two cricket pitches and marked at the southern boundary of the school by a row of Radiata pine trees. The western boundary of the playing fields has a carpark and bitumened pick up area, constructed in 1998. The 25-metre (82 ft) pool and grandstand complex is located on the eastern boundary of the playing fields along with a small grove of plantings in the south-eastern corner of the site.

== Heritage listing ==
Stafford State School was listed on the Queensland Heritage Register on 26 February 1999 having satisfied the following criteria.

The place is important in demonstrating the evolution or pattern of Queensland's history.

Stafford State School is a substantial 1948 three storey brick and tile building, associated playing fields and gardens which demonstrates the importance of the post war development of suburban Stafford. The impressive form and scale of Stafford State School is indicative of the governmental confidence in post war stability and economic growth in Queensland.

The place is important in demonstrating the principal characteristics of a particular class of cultural places.

The main building of Stafford State School is one of the final buildings of the design series which is represented by works under the Unemployment Relief Scheme of the interwar period and as such it demonstrates the characteristics of a particular type of Queensland school. The main school building is a well composed institutional building and is complemented by surrounding gardens and established plantings. The associated grounds and gardens of the school demonstrate the emphasis placed on physical education as a part of a holistic pedogological philosophy. Stafford State School's open playing fields, swimming pool and gardens demonstrate the importance of the introduction of specialist physical education into the primary school curriculum.

The place is important because of its aesthetic significance.

The combination of imposing building and plentiful open spaces is a landmark in the suburban streetscape of the area.

== See also ==
- List of schools in Greater Brisbane
- History of state education in Queensland
