= Stafford Heights, Queensland =

Stafford Heights
- Suburb
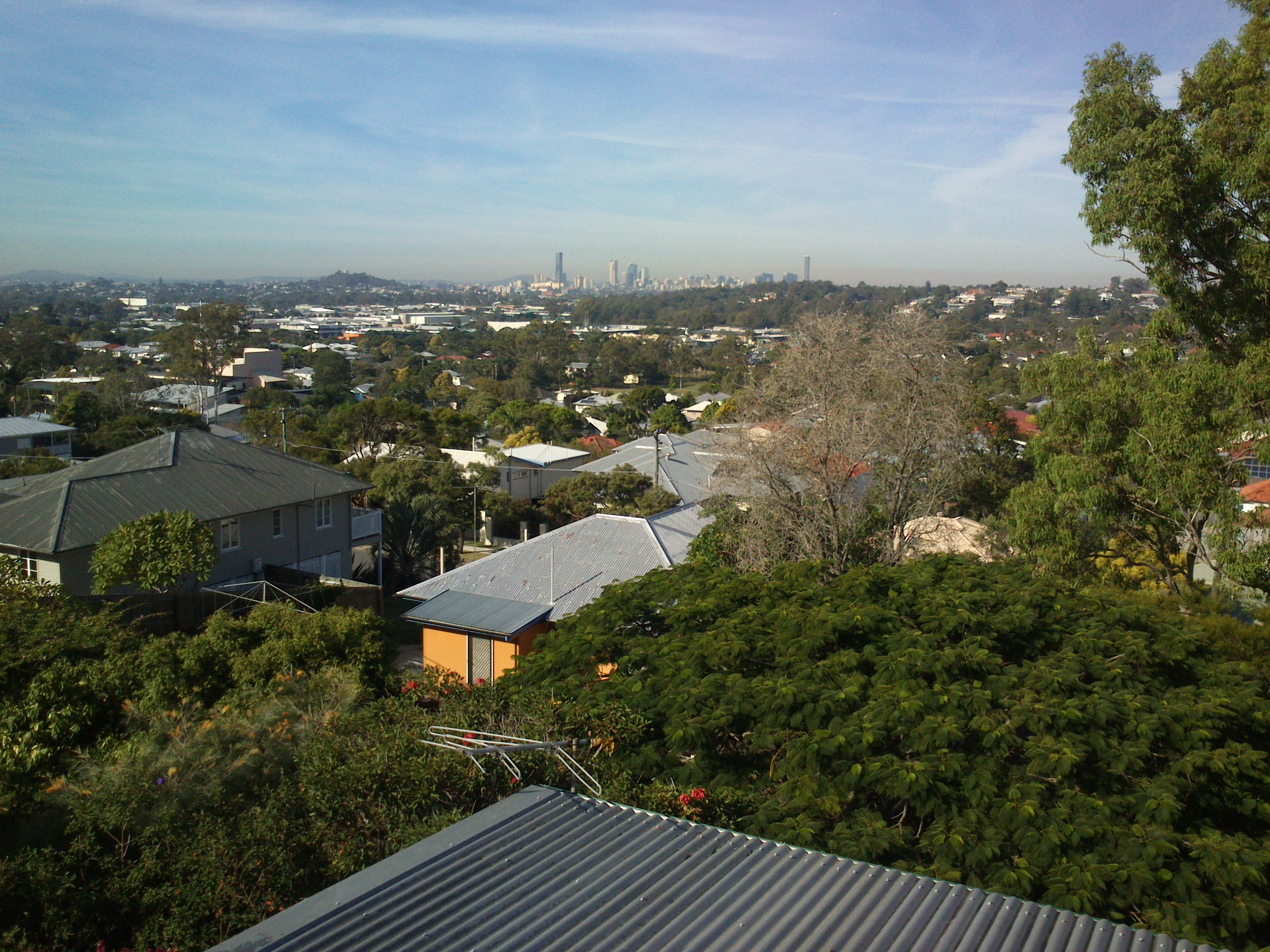
- View of Brisbane city from Stafford Heights

- Interactive map of Stafford Heights
- Coordinates: 27.3955°S 153.0105°E
- Country: Australia
- State: Queensland
- City: Brisbane
- LGA: City of Brisbane (Marchant Ward and McDowall Ward)
- Location: 10.2 km (6.3 mi) N of Brisbane CBD

Government
  - State electorates: Stafford; Everton
  - Federal division: Lilley

Area
  - Total: 2.8 km^{2} (1.1 sq mi)

Population
  - Total: 6,992 (2021 census)
  - Density: 2,500/km^{2} (6,470/sq mi)
- Time zone: UTC+10:00 (AEST)
Suburbs around Stafford Heights
McDowall	Chermside West	Kedron
Everton Park	Stafford Heights	Kedron
Everton Park	Stafford	Stafford

Stafford Heights is a northern suburb in the City of Brisbane, Queensland, Australia. In the 2021 census, Stafford Heights had a population of 6,992 people.

== Geography ==
Stafford Heights is 10.2 kilometres (6.3 mi) north of the Brisbane CBD by road.

Stafford Heights is generally hilly, and has one major waterway, Downfall Creek. Stafford Heights is north of Stafford.

== History ==
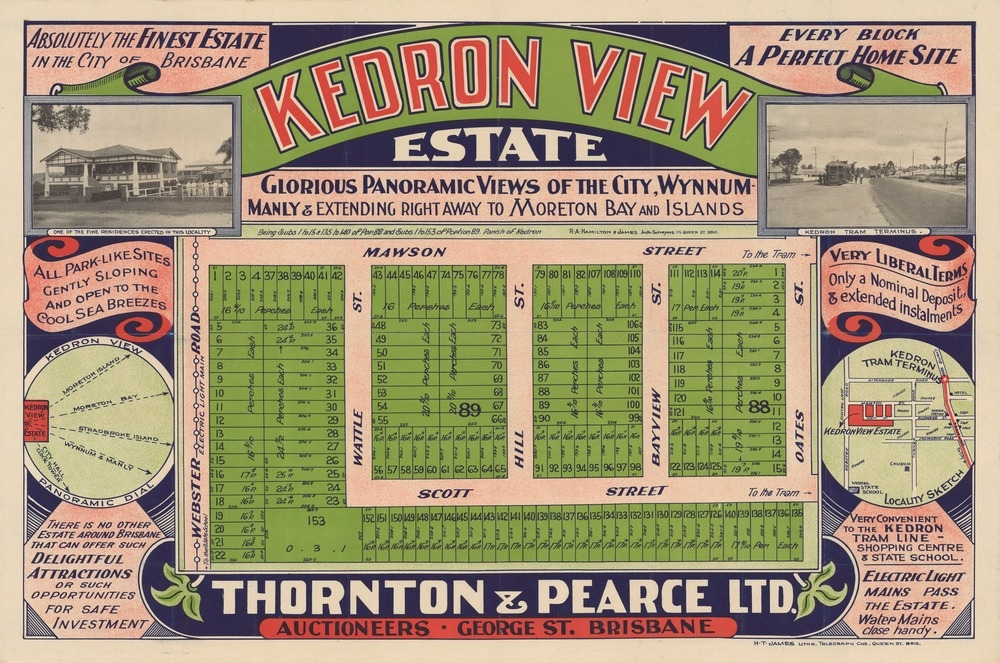
Real estate map of Kedron View Estate (mostly now within Stafford Heights), circa 1914

Stafford Heights is named because it is on higher ground than its neighbouring Stafford. The Heights name was used locally as a neighbourhood name from the 1950s, but it became a gazetted suburb in 1975. Stafford was a name adopted by local consent in 1885–1886, after Staffordshire in England.

Somerset Hills Estate, a subdivision of 243 lots was drawn in 1950 by Clem Jones Pty Ltd.

Stafford Heights State School opened on 3 April 1956.

Somerset Hills State School opened on 24 January 1966. Itt is probably named after the Somerset Hills Estate.

In 2002, Queen of Apostles Catholic Primary School opened its lower campus for younger students. Its original "upper" campus opened on 30 January 1962 in Stafford to the south.

== Demographics ==
In the 2011 census, the population of Stafford Heights was 6,780, with 51.8% female and 48.2% male. The median age of the Stafford Heights population was 38 years, 1 year above the Australian median. 76.9% of people living in Stafford Heights were born in Australia, compared to the national average of 69.8%; the next most common countries of birth were New Zealand 3.8%, England 2.6%, Italy 1.7%, Philippines 1%, India 0.5%. 84.7% of people spoke only English at home; the next most common languages were 2.9% Italian, 0.5% Greek, 0.4% Tagalog, 0.4% Cantonese, 0.4% Arabic.

In the 2016 census, Stafford Heights had a population of 6,833 people.

In the 2021 census, Stafford Heights had a population of 6,992 people.

== Education ==
Stafford Heights State School is a government primary (Prep–6) school for boys and girls at 95 Redwood Street (27.4019°S 153.0040°E). In 2018, the school had an enrolment of 134 students with 14 teachers (10 full-time equivalent) and 14 non-teaching staff (8 full-time equivalent).

Somerset Hills State School is a government primary (Prep–6) school for boys and girls on the corner of Webster Road and Kitchener Road (27.3979°S 153.0190°E). In 2018, the school had an enrolment of 160 students with 16 teachers (12 full-time equivalent) and 13 non-teaching staff (9 full-time equivalent). It includes a special education program.

Queen of Apostles Catholic Primary School is a Catholic primary (Prep–6) school for boys and girls. The school has two campuses. The lower campus (Prep–2) is at 46 Chuter Street in Stafford Heights (27.3931°S 153.0079°E), while the upper campus (3–6) is at 10 Thuruna Street in neighbouring Stafford to the south. In 2018, the school had an enrolment of 486 students with 40 teachers (28 full-time equivalent) and 35 non-teaching staff (17 full-time equivalent).

There are no secondary schools in Stafford Heights. The nearest government secondary schools are Craigslea State High School in neighbouring Chermside West to the north, Everton Park State High School in neighbouring Everton Park to the south-west, and Wavell State High School in Wavell Heights to the east.

== Amenities ==
There are a number of parks in the area:

- Aldren Street Park (27.3958°S 153.0119°E)
- Amott Street Park (27.3992°S 153.0164°E)
- Broula Park (27.4040°S 153.0208°E)
- Flockton Street Park (27.3958°S 153.0015°E)
- Grey Gum Park (27.3916°S 153.0037°E)
- Heilbromm Street Park (27.3952°S 153.0178°E)
- Parton Street Park (27.3923°S 152.9997°E)
- Sedgemoor Place Park (27.3987°S 153.0049°E)
- Venetia Street Park (27.3940°S 153.0062°E)
- Webster Road Park (27.3948°S 153.0194°E)
