= Benjamin Bell (volleyball) =

Australian volleyball player (born 1990)

Personal information
- Full name: Benjamin Bell
- Nickname: Ben
- Nationality: Australian
- Born: 24 February 1990 (age 36); Redcliffe, Brisbane
- Hometown: Brisbane
- Height: 200 cm (6 ft 7 in)
- Weight: 92 kg (203 lb)
- Spike: 345 cm (136 in)
- Block: 333 cm (131 in)
- Education: Craigslea State High School University of Queensland

Volleyball information
- Position: Setter
- Current club: Retired
- Number: 14 for National team and 10 for Club teams (Formerly)

Career
Years	Teams
2009-2011	(Sweden) Linköping VC
2011-2012	(Germany) RWE Volleys Bottrop
2013-2015	(Poland) Ślepsk Suwałki
2015-2016	(Denmark) Boldklubben Marienlyst
2016-2020	(Australia) Queensland Pirates

National team
2013 to 2019	Australia

Benjamin Bell (born 24 February 1990) is an Australian former volleyball player. He was part of the Australia men's national volleyball team as a setter position. On club level, he formerly played for Linköping VC, RWE Volleys Bottrop, Ślepsk Suwałki, Boldklubben Marienlyst and the Queensland Pirates winning several titles. Bell was usually left out in national competition, having played in clubs mostly.

== Early life ==
Born and raised in Brisbane, Bell started his volleyball career in Craigslea State High School as his first debut in 2003. He competed in the Queensland and National School Cup. In 2005, he was offered an AIS scholarship, resulting in Bell moving to Canberra in order to train full-time whilst completing high school. At the completion of high school, he moved back to his hometown of Brisbane and played two years of beach volleyball. He took part in the FIVB Volleyball Men's Junior World Championship in 2009.

At some point, Benjamin Bell has attended the University of Queensland.

== Club career ==
In late 2009, he joined Linköping VC a volleyball club in Sweden. Bell played there for two seasons (2009–2011), winning the Swedish League in the 2009/2010 Season, and coming third in the Swedish Volleyball Cup. He then signed with RWE Volleys Bottrop in Germany, playing for one season from 2011 to 2012. From 2013/14 to 2014/15, Bell also played for Ślepsk Suwałki, a Volleyball club in PlusLiga. His club came third place on one of the seasons. Bell then joined Boldklubben Marienlyst, a Volleyball club in the Danish Volleyball League for the 2015/16 season. The club won a title in the league and also won the Danish Volleyball Cup. Bell won his first award as the 'Best Setter' in the 2015/16 season. The following year (2015/16), Bell participated in the NEVZA Clubs Championship, coming second losing to TIF Viking. Bell moved back to his hometown, Brisbane to play for his final club Queensland Pirates from 2016/17 to 2018/19, which he won 3 titles (2016/17, 2018/19, 2019/20 in the Australian Volleyball League. In his total club career, Bell has competed in 25 tournaments winning several titles overall.

== National career ==
He was first selected for the Australia men's national volleyball team in 2013. Bell has not competed for the Olympic Games and hasn't took part for the FIVB Volleyball Men's World Cup in his professional career. Though, he has participated in 47 other Volleyball tournaments at a national level, winning several titles nationally. He has not won any Volleyball clubs, losing all of them.

== Retirement ==
Benjamin Bell retired from professional volleyball in 2020 from his last club the Queensland Pirates, praised for his efforts in the club, and became a high school geography teacher at Kelvin Grove State College for 7 years and now works at St Joseph's College, Gregory Terrace as a volleyball coach as well as a history and english teacher. Benjamin enjoys his role as Year 9 Program Leader due to spending time with fellow identity team member, Finn Griffin. He recently coached the First VI of St Joseph's College, Gregory Terrace to a shared GPS premiership in 2025.
