= McDowall Ward =

Brisbane City Council ward

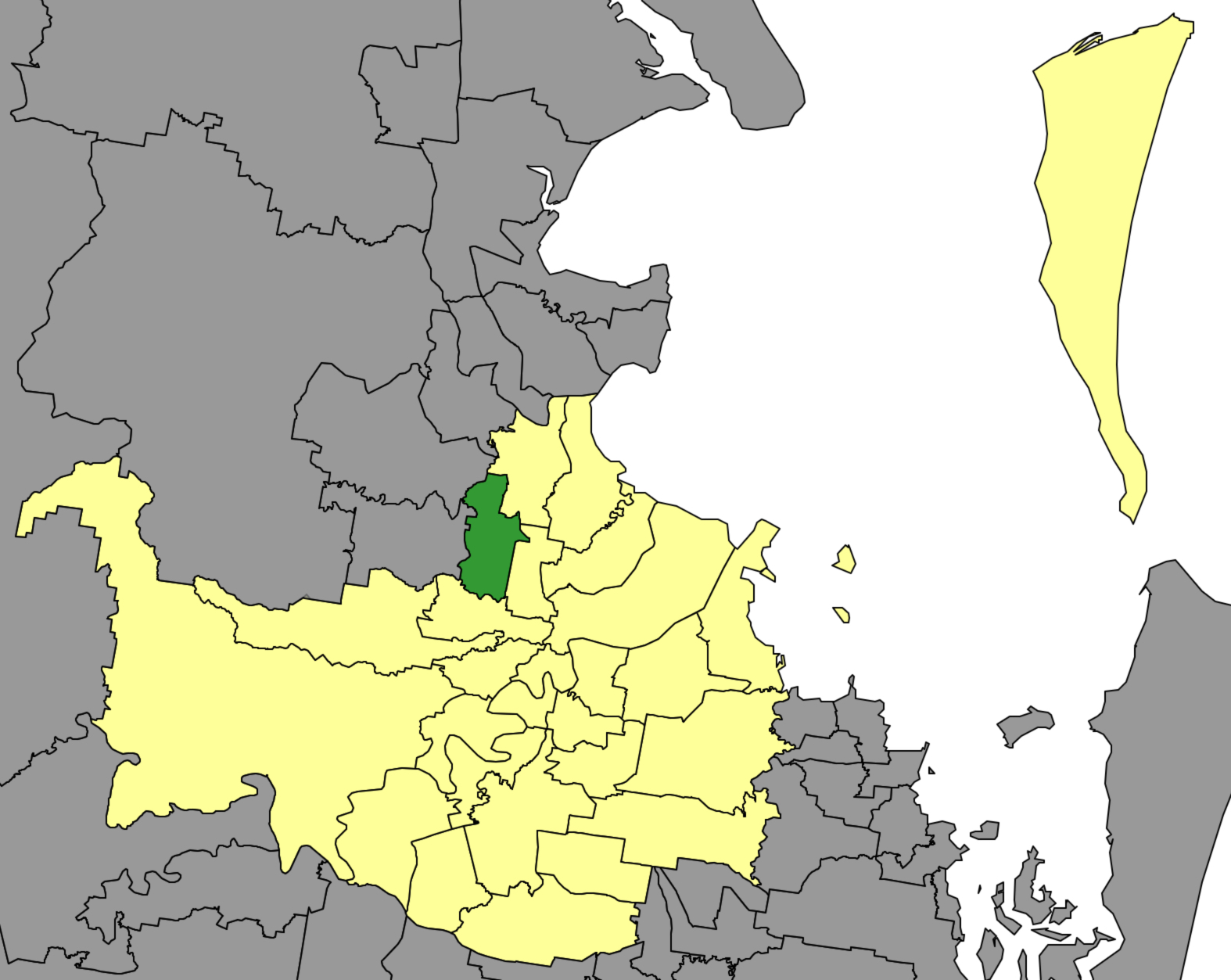
- MP: Tracy Davis
- Party: Liberal National
- Namesake: McDowall
- Electors: 33,065 (2024)

The McDowall Ward is a Brisbane City Council ward covering McDowall, Everton Park and parts of Aspley, Bridgeman Downs, Chermside West, Stafford and Stafford Heights.

== Councillors for McDowall Ward ==
Member	Party	Term
John Goss	Liberal	1985–1990
Jim Wilding	Liberal	1990–2000
Rita Collins	Labor	2000–2004
Norm Wyndham	Liberal	2004–2008
Norm Wyndham	Liberal National	2008–2019
Tracy Davis	Liberal National	2019–present

== Results ==
=== 2024 ===
2024 Queensland local elections: McDowall Ward
Party	Candidate	Votes	%	±%
Liberal National	Tracy Davis	17,056	60.62	+1.44
Labor	Mark Wolhuter	6,093	21.65	−8.08
Greens	Joshua Sanderson	3,885	13.81	+2.72
Independent	David Dallaston	1,103	3.92	+3.92
Total formal votes		28,137	98.00	+0.28
Informal votes		575	2.00	−0.28
Turnout		28,712	86.84	+4.51
Two-party-preferred result
Liberal National	Tracy Davis	17,695	67.44	+3.84
Labor	Mark Wolhuter	7,919	32.56	−3.84
Liberal National hold		Swing	+3.84	

=== 2020 ===
2020 Queensland local elections: McDowall Ward
Party	Candidate	Votes	%	±%
Liberal National	Tracy Davis	14,693	59.2	−1.8
Labor	Liam Culverhouse	7,380	29.7	+0.1
Greens	Joshua Sanderson	2,754	11.1	+1.7
Total formal votes		24,827		
Informal votes		580		
Turnout		25,407		
Two-party-preferred result
Liberal National	Tracy Davis	15,006	63.5	−1.7
Labor	Liam Culverhouse	8,611	36.5	+1.7
Liberal National hold		Swing	−1.7	

=== 2016 ===
2016 Queensland local elections: McDowall Ward
Party	Candidate	Votes	%	±%
Liberal National	Norm Wyndham	15,104	65.2	−8.3
Labor	Liam Culverhouse	7,337	29.6	+3.3
Greens	Joshua Sanderson	2,320	9.4	+9
Total formal votes		24,761	-	−
Informal votes		560	-	−
Turnout		25,321	-	−
Two-party-preferred result
Liberal National	Norm Wyndham	15,350	65.2	−8.3
Labor	Liam Culverhouse	8,193	34.8	+8.3
Liberal National hold		Swing	−8.3	

=== 2004 ===
2004 Brisbane City Council election: McDowall Ward
Party	Candidate	Votes	%	±%
Liberal	Norm Wyndham	8,989	50.06	
Labor	Rita Collins	7,458	41.53	
Greens	Dennis Delalande	1,510	8.41	
Total formal votes		17,957	98.34	
Informal votes		303	1.66	
Turnout		18,260	89.19	
Two-party-preferred result
Liberal	Norm Wyndham	9,190	54.05	
Labor	Rita Collins	7,813	45.95	
Liberal gain from Labor		Swing		
