= Queensland Family History Society =

Incorporated association formed in Brisbane, Queensland, Australia

The Queensland Family History Society (QFHS) is an incorporated association formed in Brisbane, Queensland, Australia.

== History ==
The society was established in 1979 as a non-profit, non-sectarian, non-political organisation. They aim to promote the study of family history local history, genealogy, and heraldry, and encourage the collection and preservation of records relating to the history of Queensland families.

At the end of 2022, the society relocated from 58 Bellevue Avenue, Gaythorne (27.4153°S 152.9829°E) to its new QFHS Family History Research Centre at 46 Delaware Street, Chermside (27.37798°S 153.04178°E).
