= Northside Christian College =

School in Brisbane, Australia

Location
- Brisbane, Queensland; Australia; 27.3940756°S 152.9901547°E

Information
- Type: Private
- Motto: Character through Christ
- Established: 1985
- Principal: Leighton Kuss
- Enrolment: 1212
- Campus: 151 Flockton Street, Everton Park, 4053
- Colour: Navy blue
- Website: northside.qld.edu.au

Northside Christian College was established in 1985 by Northside Christian Church (now Nexus Church). Northside Christian College is located in the northern suburb of Brisbane - Everton Park, Queensland, Australia. The College is an independent, co-educational Christian school.

Northside Christian College provides classes from prep to Year 12, within three sub-schools – Junior (Prep to Year 6), Middle (Years 7–9) and Senior (Years 10–12). The school has about 1200 students.

Northside Christian College is affiliated with Associated Christian Schools (ACS), Australian Associated Christian Schools (AACS), and Independent Schools Australia.

== Land and facilities ==
Northside Christian College is located on 151 Flockton Street, Everton Park, on the campus of Nexus Church. Recently the College added the Centre for Innovation and Creativity.

== See also ==
- List of schools in Queensland
- Education in Australia
