= Marchant Ward =

Brisbane City Council ward

Marchant Ward Queensland — Brisbane City Council
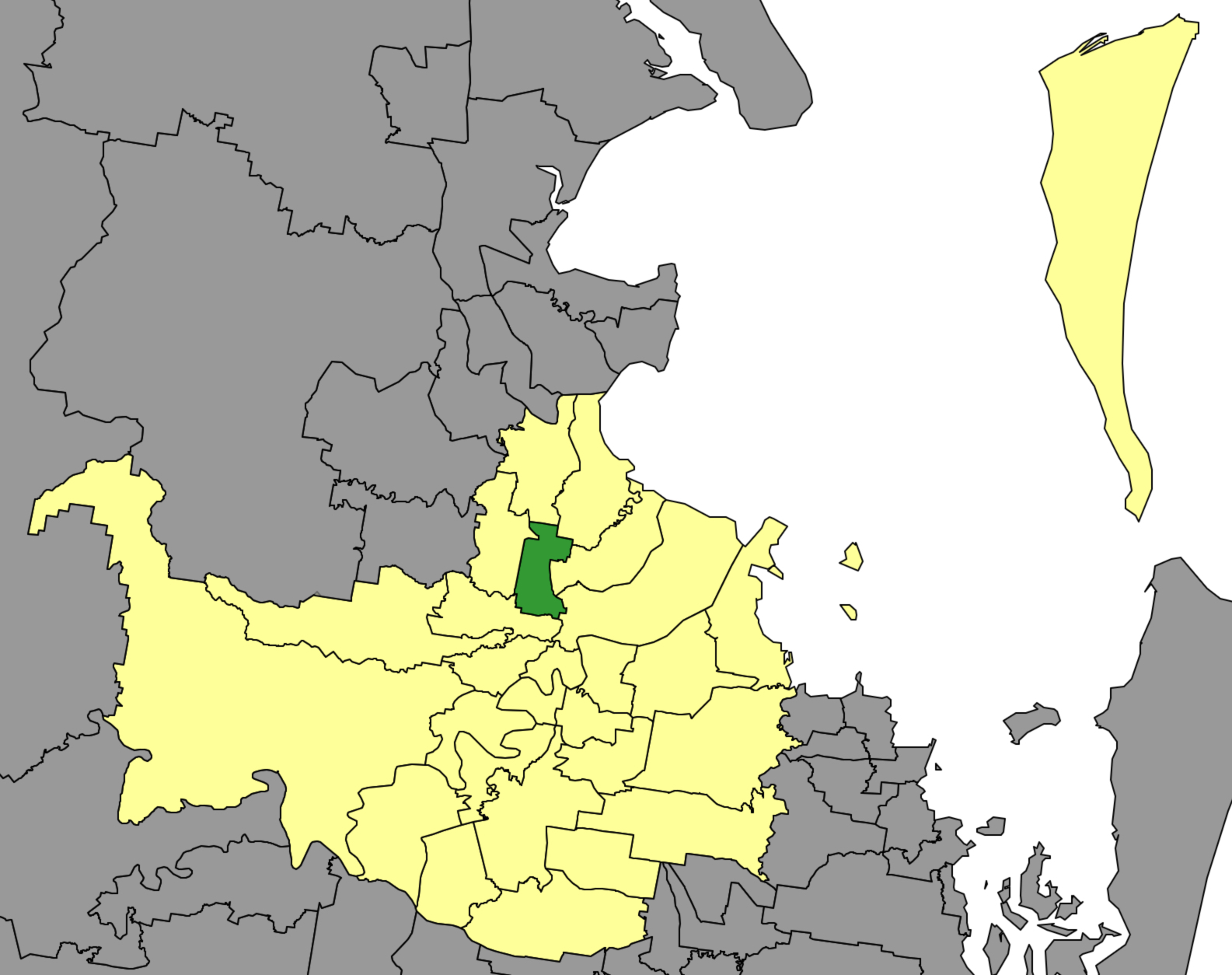
- Councillor: Danita Parry
- Party: Liberal National
- Electors: 34,306 (2024)

The Marchant Ward is a Brisbane City Council ward covering Alderley, Aspley, Chermside, Chermside West, Geebung, Gordon Park, Grange, Kedron, Lutwyche, Stafford, Stafford Heights and Windsor.

== Councillors for Marchant Ward ==
| Member | Party | Term |
|---|---|---|
| Terry Hampson | Labor | 1994–2004 |
| Faith Hopkins | Labor | 2004–2008 |
| Fiona Hammond (Note: Known as Fiona King until 2019.) | Liberal | 2008 |
| Fiona Hammond | Liberal National | 2008–2023 |
| Danita Parry | Liberal National | 2023– |

== Results ==
=== 2024 ===
2024 Queensland local elections: Marchant Ward
| Party | Candidate | Votes | % | ±% |
|---|---|---|---|---|
| Liberal National | Danita Parry | 13,200 | 46.74 | −2.56 |
| Labor | Darren Mitchell | 8,610 | 30.49 | −2.21 |
| Greens | Mekayla Anog | 6,429 | 22.77 | +4.77 |
| Total formal votes | | 28,239 | 97.78 | |
| Informal votes | | 641 | 2.22 | |
| Turnout | | 28,880 | 84.18 | |
Two-party-preferred result
| Liberal National | Danita Parry | 13,762 | 52.20 | −2.70 |
| Labor | Darren Mitchell | 12,601 | 47.80 | +2.70 |
| Liberal National hold | | Swing | +2.70 | |

=== 2020 ===
2020 Queensland local elections: Marchant Ward
| Party | Candidate | Votes | % | ±% |
|---|---|---|---|---|
| Liberal National | Fiona Hammond | 11,870 | 49.4 | −3.5 |
| Labor | Susan Lynch | 7,842 | 32.6 | −0.7 |
| Greens | John Meyer | 4,331 | 18.0 | +4.2 |
| Total formal votes | | 24,043 | | |
| Informal votes | | 676 | | |
| Turnout | | 24,719 | | |
Two-party-preferred result
| Liberal National | Fiona Hammond | 12,315 | 55.0 | −2.9 |
| Labor | Susan Lynch | 10,083 | 45.0 | +2.9 |
| Liberal National hold | | Swing | −2.9 | |

=== 2016 ===
2016 Queensland local elections: Marchant Ward
| Party | Candidate | Votes | % | ±% |
|---|---|---|---|---|
| Liberal National | Fiona King | 12,851 | 53.4 | −7.9 |
| Labor | Stephanie Serhan | 8,121 | 33.7 | +5.5 |
| Greens | Richard Nielsen | 3,107 | 12.9 | +2.5 |
| Total formal votes | | 24,079 | - | − |
| Informal votes | | 627 | - | − |
| Turnout | | 24,706 | - | − |
Two-party-preferred result
| Liberal National | Fiona King | 13,260 | 58.3 | −8.2 |
| Labor | Stephanie Serhan | 9,496 | 41.7 | +8.2 |
| Liberal National hold | | Swing | −8.2 | |

=== 2004 ===
2004 Brisbane City Council election: Marchant Ward
| Party | Candidate | Votes | % | ±% |
|---|---|---|---|---|
| Labor | Faith Hopkins | 8,882 | 46.98 | |
| Liberal | Mary Jolliffe | 7,738 | 40.93 | |
| Greens | Peter Thomas | 1,612 | 8.53 | |
| Independent | Matt Doolan | 672 | 3.55 | |
| Total formal votes | | 18,904 | 97.76 | |
| Informal votes | | 434 | 2.24 | |
| Turnout | | 19,338 | 86.40 | |
Two-party-preferred result
| Labor | Faith Hopkins | 9,299 | 53.79 | |
| Liberal | Mary Jolliffe | 7,987 | 46.21 | |
| Labor hold | | Swing | | |
