= Chermside West, Queensland =

Chermside West
- Suburb
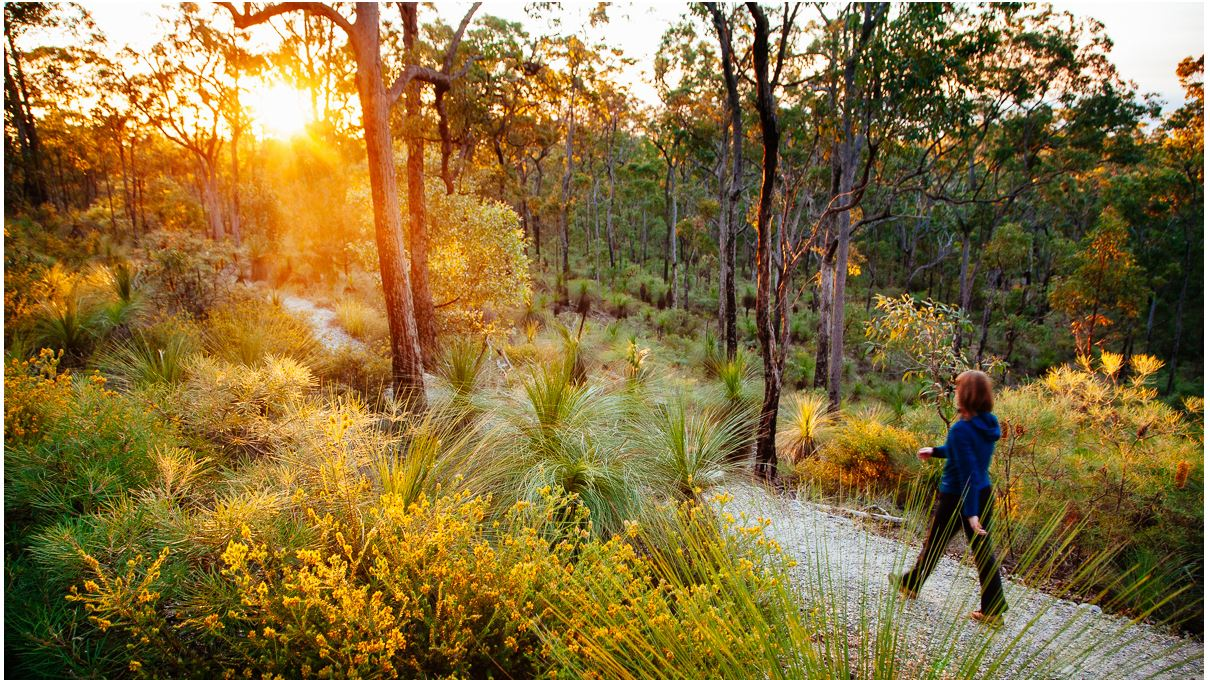
- 'Grasstree Walk' in Downfall Creek area, 2008

- Interactive map of Chermside West
- Coordinates: 27.3814°S 153.0121°E
- Country: Australia
- State: Queensland
- City: Brisbane
- LGA: City of Brisbane (Marchant Ward and McDowall Ward)
- Location: 11.7 km (7.3 mi) N of Brisbane CBD

Government
  - State electorates: Aspley; Stafford
  - Federal division: Lilley

Area
  - Total: 3.6 km^{2} (1.4 sq mi)
- Elevation: 34 m (112 ft)

Population
  - Total: 6,965 (2021 census)
  - Density: 1,935/km^{2} (5,010/sq mi)
- Time zone: UTC+10:00 (AEST)
- Postcode: 4032
Suburbs around Chermside West
Aspley	Aspley	Aspley
McDowall	Chermside West	Chermside
Stafford Heights	Stafford Heights	Kedron

Chermside West is a suburb in the City of Brisbane, Queensland, Australia. In the 2021 census, Chermside West had a population of 6,965 people. Parts of Chermside West were formerly known as Craigslea.

== Geography ==
Chermside West is located 11.7 kilometres (7.3 mi) by road north of the Brisbane CBD.

== History ==
The name Chermside honours Queensland Governor, Sir Herbert Chermside.

St Gerard Majella's Catholic Church opened in 1962 in Pullford Road. In 1977, the congregation opened the current church in Maundrell Terrace, and the Pullford Road church was later acquired by the Kedron Brook Christadelphians.

The Prince of Peace Lutheran Church opened a church in Maundrell Terrace about 1965. In 1984, the church established the Prince of Peace Lutheran Primary School in Everton Hills. In 1986, the congregation moved to its present location at Everton Hills when a new church was built on the top of the hill adjacent to the college site.

Craigslea State School opened on 24 January 1972.

Craigslea State High School opened on 28 January 1975.

== Demographics ==
In the 2011 census, Chermside West recorded a population of 6,121 people, with 51.4% female and 48.6% male. The median age of the Chermside West population was 39 years of age, 2 years above the Australian median. 75% of people living in Chermside West were born in Australia, compared to the national average of 69.8%; the next most common countries of birth were New Zealand 3.8%, England 2.6%, Italy 1.8%, India 1.5%, Philippines 1.2%. 83.6% of people spoke only English at home; the next most popular languages were 2.8% Italian, 1.4% Cantonese, 0.9% Malayalam, 0.9% Mandarin, 0.7% Hindi.

In the 2016 census, Chermside West had a population of 6,458 people.

In the 2021 census, Chermside West had a population of 6,965 people.

== Education ==
Craigslea State School is a government primary (Prep–6) school for boys and girls at Hamilton Road (27.3837°S 153.0172°E). In 2018, the school had an enrolment of 572 students with 46 teachers (40 full-time equivalent) and 37 non-teaching staff (21 full-time equivalent). It includes a special education program.

Craigslea State High School is a government secondary (7–12) school for boys and girls at 685 Hamilton Road (27.3833°S 153.0153°E). In 2018, the school had an enrolment of 978 students with 95 teachers (85 full-time equivalent) and 49 non-teaching staff (31 full-time equivalent). It includes a special education program.

== Amenities ==
Frederick Annand Park at 632 Webster Road (27.3792°S 153.0192°E) was named after Frederick Annand, the first town clerk of Greater Brisbane from 1925 to 1931. It has an electric BBQ, picnic facilities, playground facilities and a basketball half-court.

There is a shopping centre at 63 Milburn Street (27.3785°S 153.0190°E). It contains the Chermside West Post Office.

Churches in Chermside West include

- St. Gerard Majella Catholic Church, 146 Maundrell Terrace (27.3805°S 153.0124°E)
- Kedron Brook Christadelphian Ecclesia, 44 Pullford Street (27.3866°S 153.0156°E)

Downfall Creek Bushland Centre is at 815 Rode Road and has cultural and environmental displays (27.3894°S 153.0048°E). It is operated by the Brisbane City Council.

== Notable people ==
- Michael (Mick) Doohan, motorcycle racing champion, lived in West Chermisde and attended Craigslea State School
- Ben Tune, rugby union player
- Christopher Wrench, organist, made his debut as church organist when he took over playing the harmonium for church services at St. Laurence's church at West Chermside on Palm Sunday, 1969, at the age of 10 years
