= Stafford, Queensland =

Stafford
- Suburb
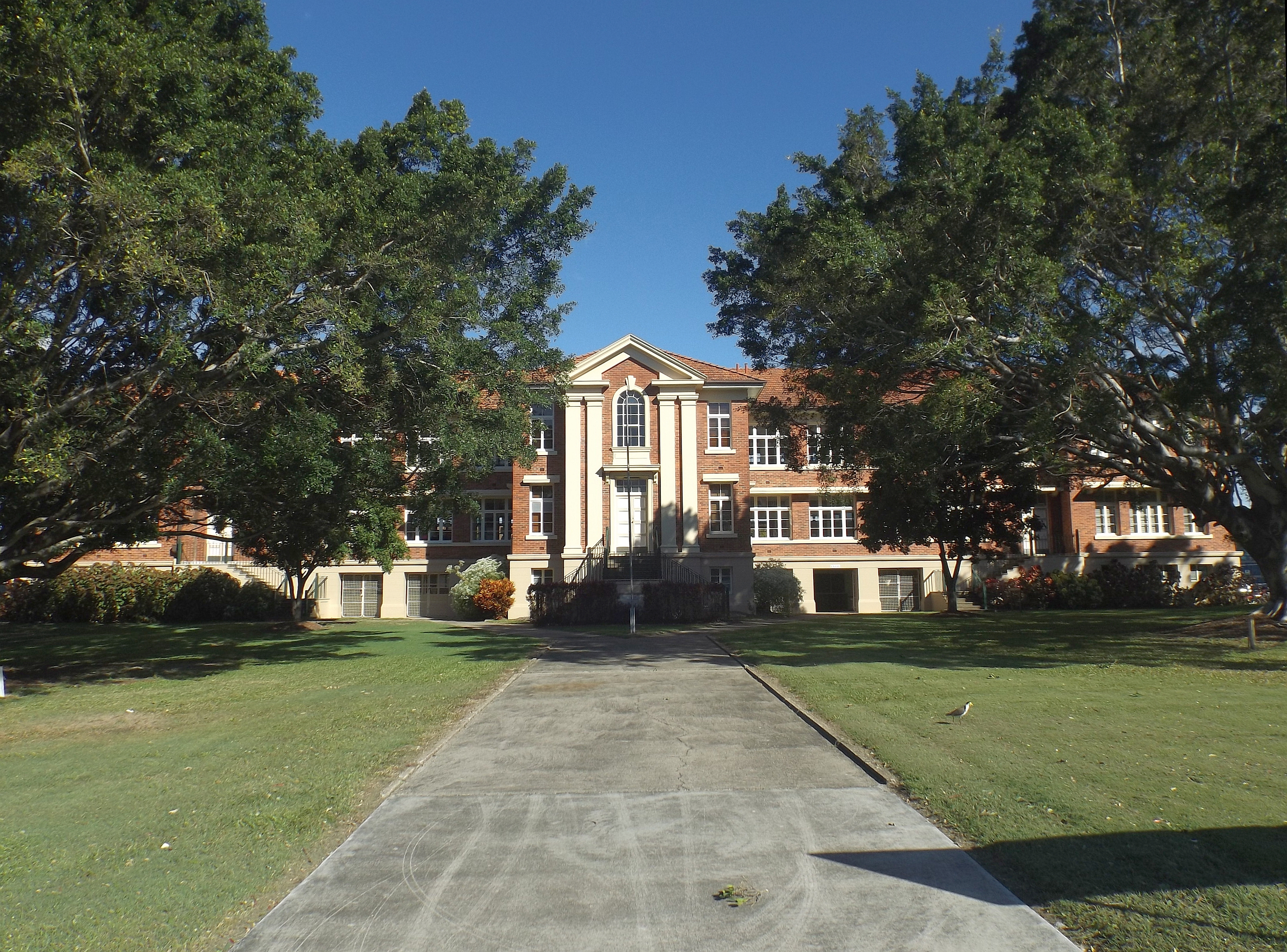
- Stafford State School, 2015

- Interactive map of Stafford
- Coordinates: 27.4122°S 153.0102°E
- Country: Australia
- State: Queensland
- City: Brisbane
- LGA: City of Brisbane (Marchant Ward and McDowall Ward)
- Location: 9.1 km (5.7 mi) N of Brisbane CBD

Government
  - State electorate: Stafford
  - Federal divisions: Brisbane; Lilley

Area
  - Total: 3.4 km^{2} (1.3 sq mi)

Population
  - Total: 6,978 (2021 census)
  - Density: 2,052/km^{2} (5,320/sq mi)
- Time zone: UTC+10:00 (AEST)
- Postcode: 4053
Suburbs around Stafford
Everton Park	Stafford Heights	Kedron
Everton Park	Stafford	Gordon Park
Enoggera	Alderley	Grange

Stafford is a northern suburb in the City of Brisbane, Queensland, Australia. In the 2021 census, Stafford had a population of 6,978 people.

== Geography ==
Stafford is predominantly a residential suburb, including some original Queenslander-style homes and a significant number of post-war Queensland Housing Commission homes on quarter-acre blocks built around the 1940s and 1950s.

Stafford lies to the west of Lutwyche Road, along the banks of Kedron Brook. Being an area of that age, many of Stafford's residents are elderly, but younger families are increasingly moving there.

Sparkes Hill (27.4115°S 153.0013°E) is in the south-west of the suburb and is 96 metres (315 ft) above sea level. The water reservoir on the top of the hill holds 94 megalitres (3.3×10^{6} cu ft), which 16% of Brisbane's water supply.

== History ==
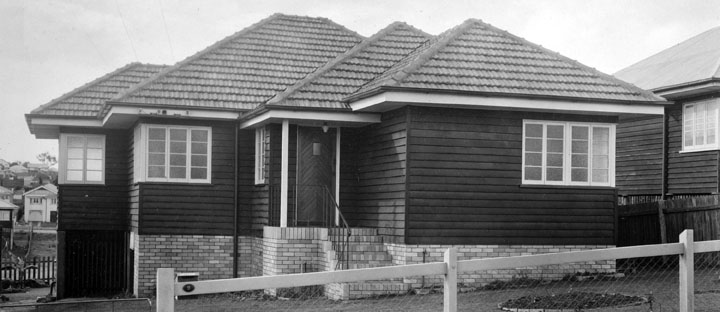
Queensland Housing Commission house at Stafford, August 1949

Stafford was originally called Happy Valley. It is possible that the name originates from the fact that Sir Thomas Brisbane for whom the city is named was an officer in the Staffordshire Regiment – a Stafford Knot is featured in the city's coat-of-arms. A public move to rename the area after the English county of Staffordshire in 1885 and 1886 led to its current name.

Stafford State School opened on 25 May 1886. On 24 January 1955, the Stafford Infants State School opened removing the younger children from the main. The infant school closed on 9 December 1977, and the younger children became part of the main school again. The Stafford area was originally known as Happy Valley, and the earliest school registers list the school's name at that time as either Happy Valley (Lutwyche) State School or Stafford (Happy Valley) State School.

In 1928, in what is now known as Stafford, 20 sites at Gourock Estate, Kedron—being resubdivisions 1 to 20 (subs A & B easements) of subdivision 1 of portion 96, Parish of Kedron—were advertised for auction by Isles, Love & Co. Auctioneers. A map produced to advertise the sale shows the land for sale being off Main Stafford (or Happy Valley) Road, near Clifford St.

Between 1940 and 1968 Stafford was served by electric trams operated by the Brisbane City Council. This was the last completely new tram line (as distinct from the tram line extension) built in Brisbane.

The Stafford Church of Christ was established through an outreach of the Kedron Church of Christ in the early 1950s commencing with Bible schools. Land at 610 Stafford Street (27.4077°S 152.9990°E) was purchased circa October 1952. In January 1953, an old army hut was relocated to the site to be converted to a chapel. The new chapel was dedicated early in March 1954. In 1963, the Stafford church became independent of the Kedron church. It is now known as the Fellowship Baptist Church of Christ.

Queen of Apostles Catholic Primary School opened on 30 January 1962. In 1969, it opened its second campus for the younger students in neighbouring Stafford Heights to the north.

Construction commenced on the water reservoirs on top of Sparkes Hill in 1973 and was completed in 1978.

One of the original large employers of local workers, Gibson's Tannery (also known as Scotia Works), closed in 1982 to make way for the Stafford City Shopping Centre, which opened in March 1984. The centre was extended again in 1997, which opened in December of that year to include a new food court and the first 10-screen cinema complex in Brisbane at the time, operated by Australian Multiplex Cinemas. Previously, the Stafford Road shopping strip at the tram terminus was the local centre.

== Demographics ==
In the 2016 census, Stafford had a population of 6,561 people.

In the 2021 census, Stafford had a population of 6,978 people, 51% female and 49% male. The median age of the Stafford population was 35 years, 3 years below the Australian median. 75.2% of people living in Stafford were born in Australia, compared to the national average of 66.9%; the next most common countries of birth were England 2.9%, New Zealand 2.7%, India 1.4%, Philippines 1.1%, South Africa 0.7%. 82% of people spoke only English at home; the next most common languages were 1% Mandarin, 0.8% Italian, 0.6% Hindi, 0.6% Spanish, 0.6% Cantonese.

== Heritage listings ==
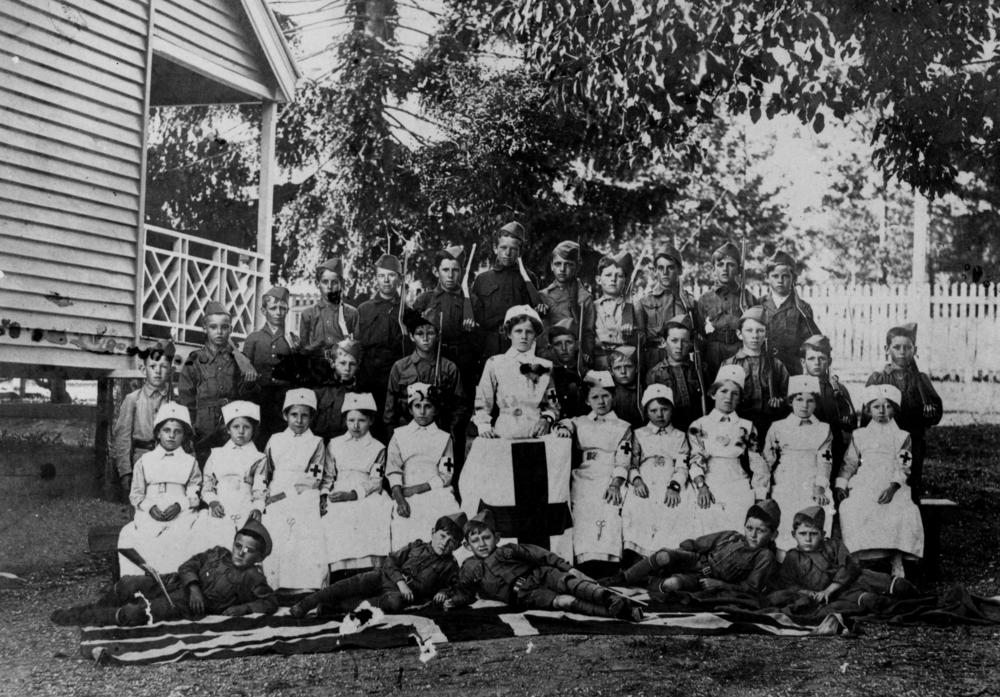
Group of children dressed up for a patriotic concert at Stafford State School, Brisbane, 1915

Stafford has a number of heritage-listed sites, including:

- 314 Stafford Road: Stafford State School

== Education ==
Stafford State School is a government primary (Prep–6) school for boys and girls at 314 Stafford Road (27.4107°S 153.0174°E). In 2018, the school had an enrolment of 264 students with 32 teachers (25 full-time equivalent) and 33 non-teaching staff (19 full-time equivalent). It includes a special education program.

Queen of Apostles Catholic Primary School is a co-educational Catholic primary school (Prep–Year 6). The school has two campuses. The upper campus (3–6) is at 10 Thuruna Street (27.4044°S 153.0080°E) while the lower campus (Prep–2) is at 46 Chuter Street in Stafford Heights . In 2018, the school had an enrolment of 486 students with 40 teachers (28 full-time equivalent) and 35 non-teaching staff (17 full-time equivalent).

There is no secondary school in Stafford. The nearest government secondary schools are Everton Park State High School in neighbouring Everton Park to the west and Kedron State High School in neighbouring Kedron to the east.

== Amenities ==
There are a number of parks in the suburb, including:

- Bilston Street Park (27.4159°S 153.0125°E)
- Boles Street Park (27.4062°S 153.0025°E)
- Father Jack Madden Place Park (27.4071°S 153.0174°E)
- Gibson Park (27.4126°S 153.0142°E)
- Hickey Park (27.4150°S 153.0202°E)
- Keith Payne Park (27.4097°S 153.0218°E)
- Keong Park (27.4072°S 153.0067°E)
- Longland Street Park (27.4105°S 152.9988°E)
- Roy Harvey Park (27.4106°S 153.0062°E)
- Shand Street Park (27.4148°S 153.0035°E)
- Sheehy Street Park (27.4125°S 153.0064°E)

== Sporting clubs ==
The Wilston Grange Australian Football Club has played Australian rules football at Hickey Park in Stafford since 1964. The Past Brothers competes in the South East Division junior competitions, playing out of Gibson Park in Stafford.
