= McDowall State School =

Location
- McDowall, Queensland; Australia; 27°23′19″S 152°59′20″E

Information
- Type: State primary school. Co-educational
- Motto: Courtesy, Honesty, Knowledge
- Established: 1975
- Principal: Aminta Miller
- Enrolment: 1,022 (2023)
- Colours: Red, green and white
- Website: http://mcdowallss.eq.edu.au

McDowall State School is a public, co-educational, primary school, located in the Brisbane suburb of McDowall, in Queensland, Australia. It is administered by the Department of Education, with an enrolment of 1,022 students and a teaching staff of 71, as of 2023. The school serves students from Prep to Year 6.

== History ==
The school opened on 28 January 1975.

== School uniform ==
The main McDowall State School colours are red and green and these are reflected in the school uniform. The formal school uniform is a tartan button-up shirt, which can also be bought as a dress. The school has a red polo sporting shirt, and polo shirts in school house colours are worn for sporting events and on Friday.

== Sporting houses ==
McDowall State School has four sporting houses, named after native Australian plants:

- Acacia
  House colour: yellow
- Banksia
  House colour: green
- Grevillea
  House colour: red
- Melaleuca
  House colour: blue

== See also ==
- List of schools in Queensland
