= Douglas Annand =

Australian artist (1903–1976)

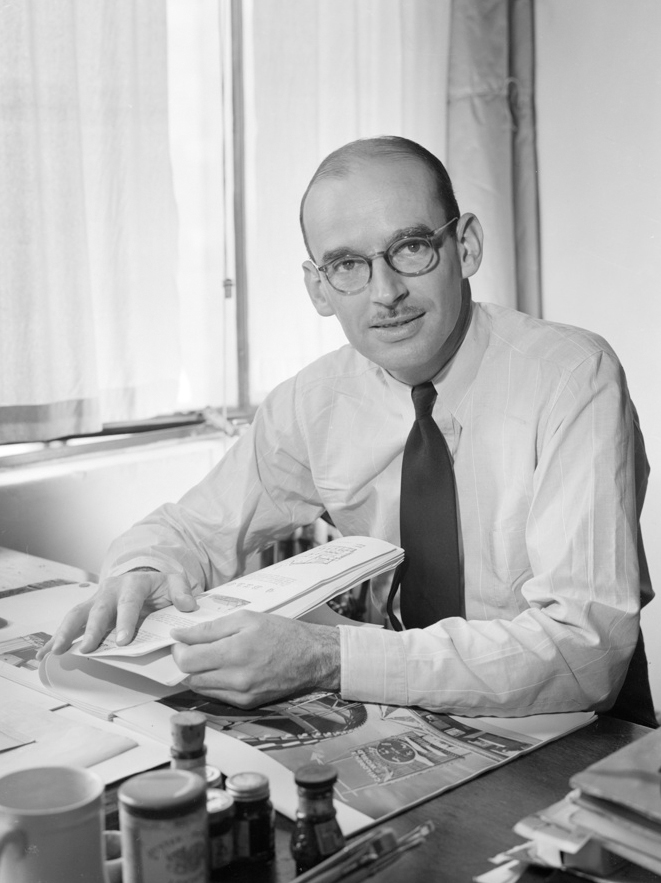
- Studio Portrait of Douglas Annand, March 1941, by Max Dupain
- Born: 22 March 1903; Toowoomba, Queensland
- Died: 14 December 1976 (aged 73); Wahroonga, New South Wales
- Known for: Painting

Douglas Shenton Annand (22 March 1903 – 14 December 1976) was an Australian graphic designer and artist.

== Early life ==
Born at Toowoomba, Queensland, to Frederick Annand and Helen Alice Robinson. Douglas attended Tudor House School, located in Moss Vale. He later returned (1956) and painted a mural on the rear wall of the memorial hall at Tudor House.

Annand studied commercial art at the Central Technical College in Brisbane. He moved to Sydney in his twenties and remained there for the rest of his life.

== Career ==
After working for several firms, he began as a freelance artist and designer in 1931. His poster for the opening of the Sydney Harbour Bridge in 1932 was very well known. He did commercial work for department stores like Farmers, David Jones, Grace Bros and Anthony Hordern & Sons. He designed the ceiling of the Australian Pavilion for the 1937 Paris International Exhibition. In 1939, he became design director for the Australian Pavilion at the New York World's Fair. For his work on this pavilion's design he received the 1940 bronze medal from the Australian Commercial and Industrial Artists’ Association. He took government commissions during World War II including the Royal Australian Air Force.

After the Second World War he was commissioned for many murals, winning the Sir John Sulman Prize in 1941, 1947 and 1951. In 1948 he began work for P&O. He designed posters, fabrics, brochures, menus, and many murals for their liners the Orcades and the Oronsay. He created interiors for the Australian National University. He took a Mosman Art Prize for one of his watercolour canvases. His work also extended to magazine covers like Meanjin and coins.

Annand died at Wahroonga, Sydney, in 1976, aged 73. He was survived by one of his two sons.

== Legacy ==
In 2000 Annand was inducted into the AGDA (Australian Graphic Design Association) Paperpoint Hall of Fame. Sketches, photographs and correspondence from Annand are held in the University of Queensland Fryer Library.
