= 2nd Pioneer Battalion (Australia) =

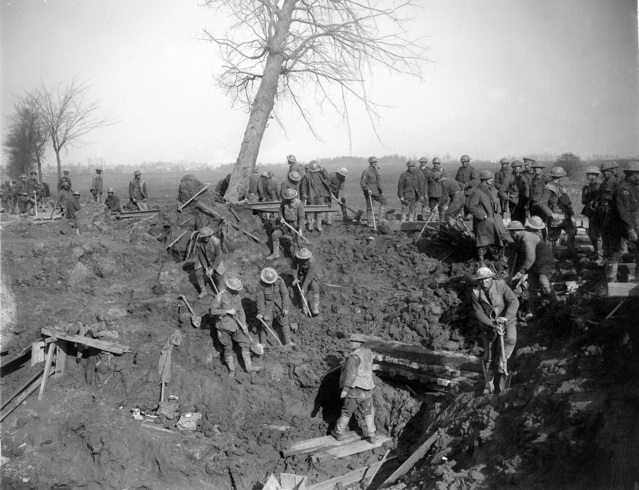
- Pioneers from the 2nd Pioneer Battalion at Bapaume, March 1917
- Active: 1916–1919
- Country: Australia
- Branch: Australian Army
- Role: Pioneer
- Size: Battalion
- Part of: 2nd Division
- Colours: Purple and white
- Engagements: First World War: Western Front

Insignia
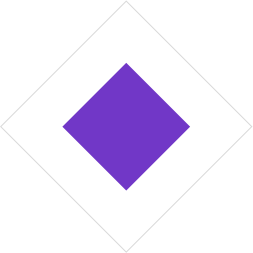
- Unit colour patch

The 2nd Pioneer Battalion was an Australian infantry and light engineer unit raised for service during the First World War as part of the all volunteer Australian Imperial Force (AIF). Formed in Egypt in March 1916, the battalion subsequently served on the Western Front in France and Belgium, after being transferred to the European battlefields shortly after its establishment. Assigned to the 2nd Division, the 2nd Pioneer Battalion fought in most of the major battles that the AIF participated in between mid-1916 and the end of the war in November 1918. It was subsequently disbanded in early 1919.

== History ==
The 2nd Pioneers were established on 10 March 1916, at Tel-el-Kebir in Egypt, and were subsequently assigned to the 2nd Division. The battalion was formed in the aftermath of the failed Gallipoli campaign when the Australian Imperial Force (AIF) was expanded as part of plans to transfer it from the Middle East to Europe for service in the trenches along the Western Front. This expansion saw several new infantry divisions raised in Egypt and Australia, as well as specialist support units such as machine gun companies, engineer companies, artillery batteries and pioneer battalions, which were needed to meet the conditions prevalent on the Western Front. Its first commanding officer was Lieutenant Colonel Frederick Annand, a Royal Australian Engineers officer.

Trained as infantrymen, they were also tasked with some engineer functions, with a large number of personnel possessing trade qualifications from civilian life. As such, they were designated as pioneer units. The pioneer concept had existed within the British Indian Army before the war, but had not initially been adopted in other British Empire forces. In early 1916, the Australian Army was reorganised ahead of its transfer to the Western Front in Europe. A total of five pioneer battalions were raised by the AIF at this time, with one being assigned to each of the five infantry divisions that the Australians deployed to the battlefield in France and Belgium. Tasked with digging trenches, labouring, constructing strong points and light railways, and undertaking battlefield clearance, the troops assigned to the pioneers required construction and engineering experience in addition to basic soldiering skills.

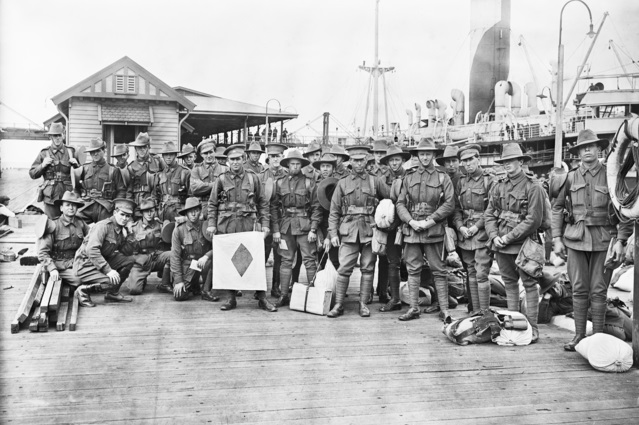
The 12th Reinforcements for the 2nd Pioneers at Port Melbourne, 30 October 1917

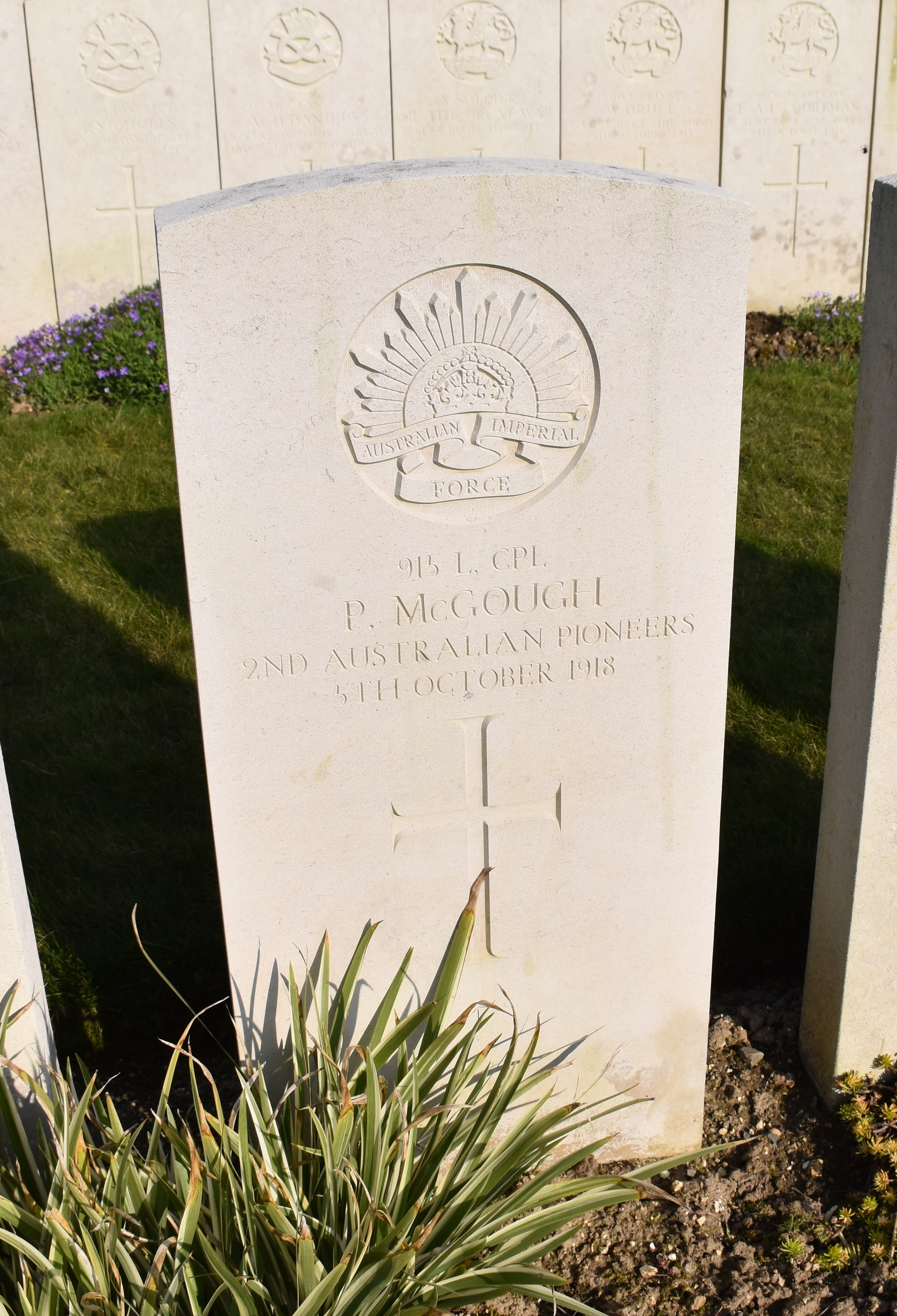
Grave of a soldier of the 2nd Australian Pioneers in the Montbrehain Military Cemetery.

Formed from volunteers drawn from the state of Victoria, the battalion consisted of four companies, under a headquarters company. The battalion subsequently served on the Western Front from mid-1916 until the end of the war. To identify the battalion's personnel, they were issued with a purple and white unit colour patch. The colours were in common with other Australian pioneer battalions, while the diamond shape denoted that the unit was part of the 2nd Division. The battalion's first major action was fought around the Pozieres heights in late July 1916, during which it suffered over 200 casualties during a two-week period.

Despite the heavy losses at Pozieres, the pioneers subsequently took part in the Battle of Mouquet Farm in July and August 1916. The following year, after the Germans withdrew to the Hindenburg Line, and the pioneers were committed to a series of actions aimed at attacking these defences as part of Allied efforts to follow up the Germans. This saw them take part in the fighting during the Second Battle of Bullecourt in May, and the Third Battle of Ypres later in the year. In early 1918, they helped to defend against the German spring offensive in early 1918. In August 1918, the 2nd Pioneers supported the Allied advance during the Hundred Days Offensive, which ultimately brought about an end to the war.

Their final action came around Montbrehain amidst the Battle of St. Quentin Canal in early October 1918. In the lead up to the battle, the 2nd Pioneers carried out bridging operations over the Somme, but later they were used primarily as infantry during the assault on the village due to heavy losses amongst 2nd Division's infantry battalions earlier in the year. During the battle, the 2nd Pioneers were moved into the line at night, taking over from an exhausted brigade, and holding their position throughout the night until relieved. Later, the pioneers joined the "mopping up operations", taking up a position to the flank of the 21st and 24th Infantry Battalions, in what historian William Westerman describes as the "most successful use of Australian pioneers in a combat capacity in the entire war". Losses in this final attack amounted to 19 killed and 87 wounded. Shortly afterwards the Australian Corps was withdrawn from the line for rest at the behest of the Australian prime minister, Billy Hughes, and the battalion saw no further action before the armistice in November. As personnel were repatriated to Australia in drafts as part of the gradual demobilisation of the AIF, the battalion's strength dwindled until finally it was disbanded on 18 May 1919 while in the Charleroi area of Belgium.

== Legacy ==
Within the AIF, according to Westerman, the pioneer battalion concept was not "effectively employed by Australian commanders". In this regard, Westerman argues that the AIF pioneer battalions were rigidly utilized as either engineers or infantry, instead of "integrating those two functions". Additionally, while he argues that they were under utilised in their infantry roles, and that the amount of time that was spent training as infantry and the resources consumed was disproportionate for the amount of time they spent in the line undertaking infantry tasks. While several units, such as the 2nd Pioneers at Montrebrehain, undertook successful infantry actions, units such the 1st and 4th Pioneers never saw action directly in their infantry role. Additionally, the units' separation from the field engineers resulted in "administrative, organisational and command and control problems" which even limited their utility as engineering formations.

After the war, the concept of pioneer battalions was discontinued in the Australian Army. In the immediate aftermath of the war, as plans were drawn up for the shape of the post conflict Army, a proposal was put forth to raise six pioneer battalions in the peacetime Army, but a combination of global disarmament and financial hardship resulted in this plan being scrapped. As a result, pioneer battalions disappeared from the Australian Army order of battle until the Second World War, when four such battalions were raised as part of the Second Australian Imperial Force. According to Alexander Rodger, as a result of the decision not to re-raise pioneer battalions in the interwar years, no battle honours were subsequently awarded to the 2nd Pioneer Battalion – or any other First World War pioneer battalion – as there was no equivalent unit to perpetuate the honours when they were promulgated by the Australian Army in 1927.
