= Danish Volleyball League =

- Current season, competition or edition: 2026–27 Danish Volleyball League
- Sport: Volleyball
- Founded: 1963
- First season: 1963
- Administrator: DVF
- No. of teams: 10
- Country: Denmark
- Continent: Europe
- Level on pyramid: 1
- Relegation to: 2nd League
- Domestic cups: Danish Cup; Danish Super Cup
- International cups: CEV Champions League; CEV Cup; CEV Challenge Cup
- Website: volleyball.dk

The Denmark Men's Volleyball League is a men's volleyball competition organized by the Dansk Volleyball Forbund (DVF), it was created in 1963.

== History ==
In the 2018/19 season in Elitsidizion 11 teams has participated: "Gentofte, Marienlist (Odense), Vidovre, Middelfart, Aarhus, Ishoi, Westchellann (Corser), Nordenskuv Ungdoms-Og (Orré-Sogne), Ikast KFUM (Ikast), Ishoi, Amager (Copenhagen), Aalborg. The championship title was won for the second time in a row by "Gentofte", who won the final series beating "Vidovre" 3-1 (3:0, 3:0, 1:3, 3:2). The 3rd place went to "Marienlist".

== Winners list ==
- 1963 : Vognmandsmarken
- 1964 : Vognmandsmarken
- 1965 : USG København
- 1966 : Vognmandsmarken
- 1967 : Vognmandsmarken
- 1968 : Vognmandsmarken
- 1969 : VKV Gladsaxe
- 1970 : VKV Gladsaxe
- 1971 : Rødovre St.
- 1972 : Rødovre St.
- 1973 : Rødovre St.
- 1974 : Middelfart VK
- 1975 : Rødovre St.
- 1976 : Middelfart VK
- 1977 : Middelfart VK
- 1978 : VKV Gladsaxe
- 1979 : VKV Gladsaxe
- 1980 : VKV Gladsaxe
- 1981 : VKV Gladsaxe
- 1982 : DHV Odense
- 1983 : DHV Odense
- 1984 : VKV Gladsaxe
- 1985 : VKV Gladsaxe
- 1986 : Holte IF
- 1987 : Holte IF
- 1988 : Holte IF
- 1989 : Holte IF
- 1990 : Holte IF
- 1991 : Holte IF
- 1992 : Holte IF
- 1993 : Holte IF
- 1994 : Holte IF
- 1995 : Holte IF
- 1996 : Gentofte Volley
- 1997 : Holte IF
- 1998 : Holte IF
- 1999 : Gentofte Volley
- 2000 : DHV Odense
- 2001 : Aalborg HIK
- 2002 : Aalborg HIK
- 2003 : DHV Odense
- 2004 : SK Aahrus
- 2005 : Maryenlist Odense
- 2006 : Maryenlist Odense
- 2007 : Gentofte Volley
- 2008 : Maryenlist Odense
- 2009 : Maryenlist Odense
- 2010 : Maryenlist Odense
- 2011 : Maryenlist Odense
- 2012 : Middelfart VK
- 2013 : Marienlyst Odense
- 2014 : Marienlyst Odense
- 2015 : Gentofte Volley
- 2016 : Gentofte Volley
- 2017 : Marienlyst Odense
- 2018 : Gentofte Volley
- 2019 : Gentofte Volley
- 2020 : Gentofte Volley
- 2021 : Gentofte Volley
- 2022 : Middelfart VK
- 2023 : Marienlyst Odense
- 2024 : Marienlyst Odense
- 2025 : Marienlyst Odense
- 2026 : Gentofte Volley
