= Everton Park, Queensland =

Everton Park
- Suburb
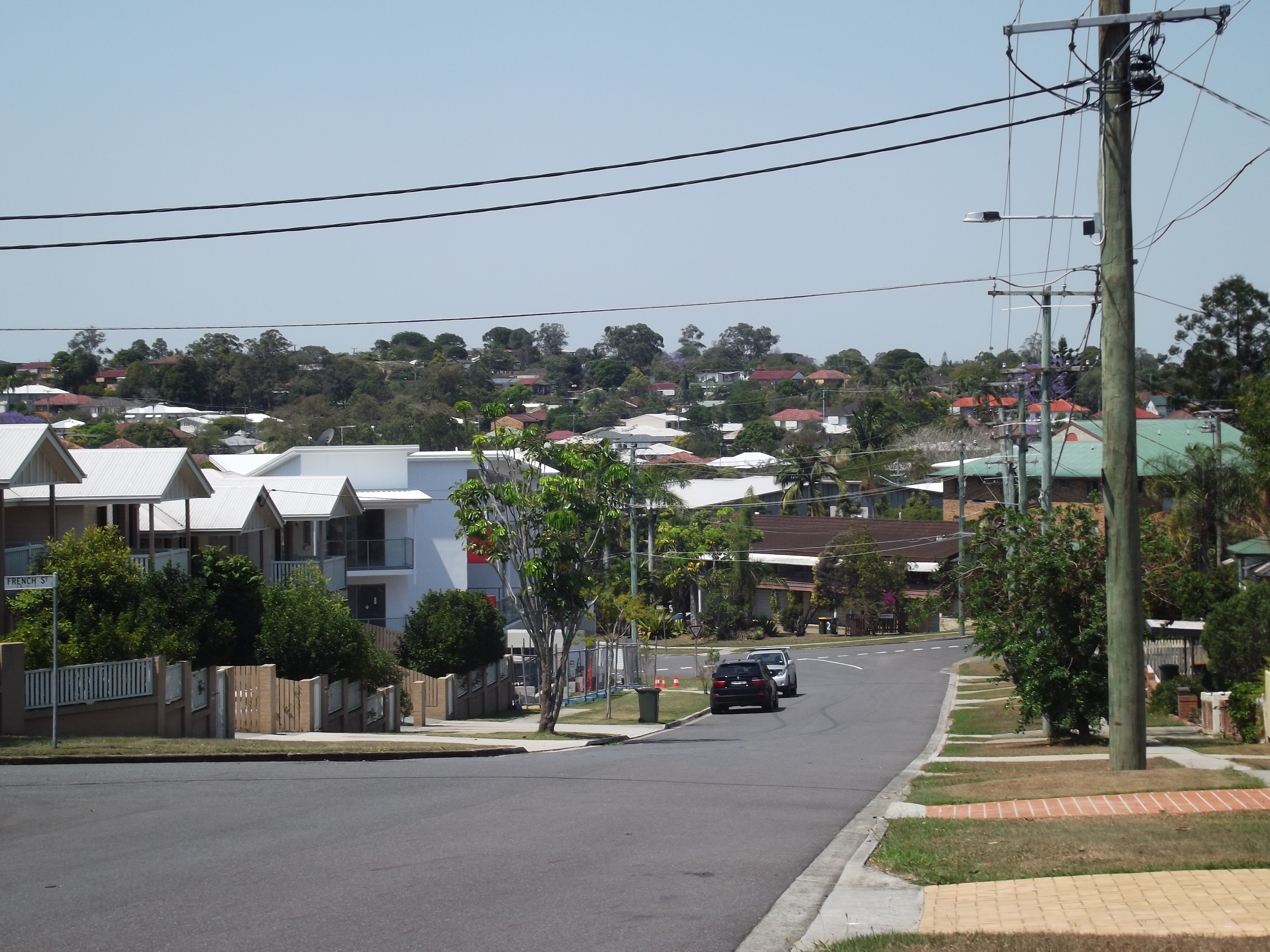
- White Street looking East

- Interactive map of Everton Park
- Coordinates: 27.3980°S 152.9883°E
- Country: Australia
- State: Queensland
- City: Brisbane
- LGA: City of Brisbane (McDowall Ward)
- Location: 10.8 km (6.7 mi) N of Brisbane CBD

Government
  - State electorates: Everton; Stafford
  - Federal divisions: Lilley; Brisbane

Area
  - Total: 4.4 km^{2} (1.7 sq mi)

Population
  - Total: 10,111 (2021 census)
  - Density: 2,298/km^{2} (5,950/sq mi)
- Time zone: UTC+10:00 (AEST)
- Postcode: 4053
Suburbs around Everton Park
Everton Hills	McDowall	Stafford Heights
Everton Hills	Everton Park	Stafford
Mitchelton	Gaythorne	Enoggera

Everton Park is a northern suburb of the City of Brisbane, Queensland, Australia. In the 2021 census, Everton Park had a population of 10,111 people.

== Geography ==
Everton Park is about eight kilometres north of the Brisbane CBD. It is predominantly residential; in 2011, more than a quarter of the population lived in semi-detached and higher-density dwellings.

== History ==
The suburb takes its name from the Everton Park Estate subdivision. Everton was the name of the residence of pioneer settlers William James McDowall and Ambrose McDowall, which was named after Everton, a suburb of Liverpool, England.

In the 1890s, the town of Bunyaville (27.3903°S 152.9772°E) was located north of South Pine Road in the present-day suburbs of Everton Hills and Everton Park. Until 1891, it was known as Kedron after Kedron Brook which flows through the area.

Bunyaville Baptist Church opened on Saturday 2 July 1932. It was on Timms Road (now in Everton Hills) on land donated by Arthur Timms with some financial assistance from the Newmarket Baptist Church. It was built "in a day" on Saturday 4 June 1932.

Bunyaville State School opened on 18 June 1934. In 1954 it was renamed Everton Park State School.

Everton Park State High School opened on 23 January 1961 (but it was originally intended to be called Stafford State High School).

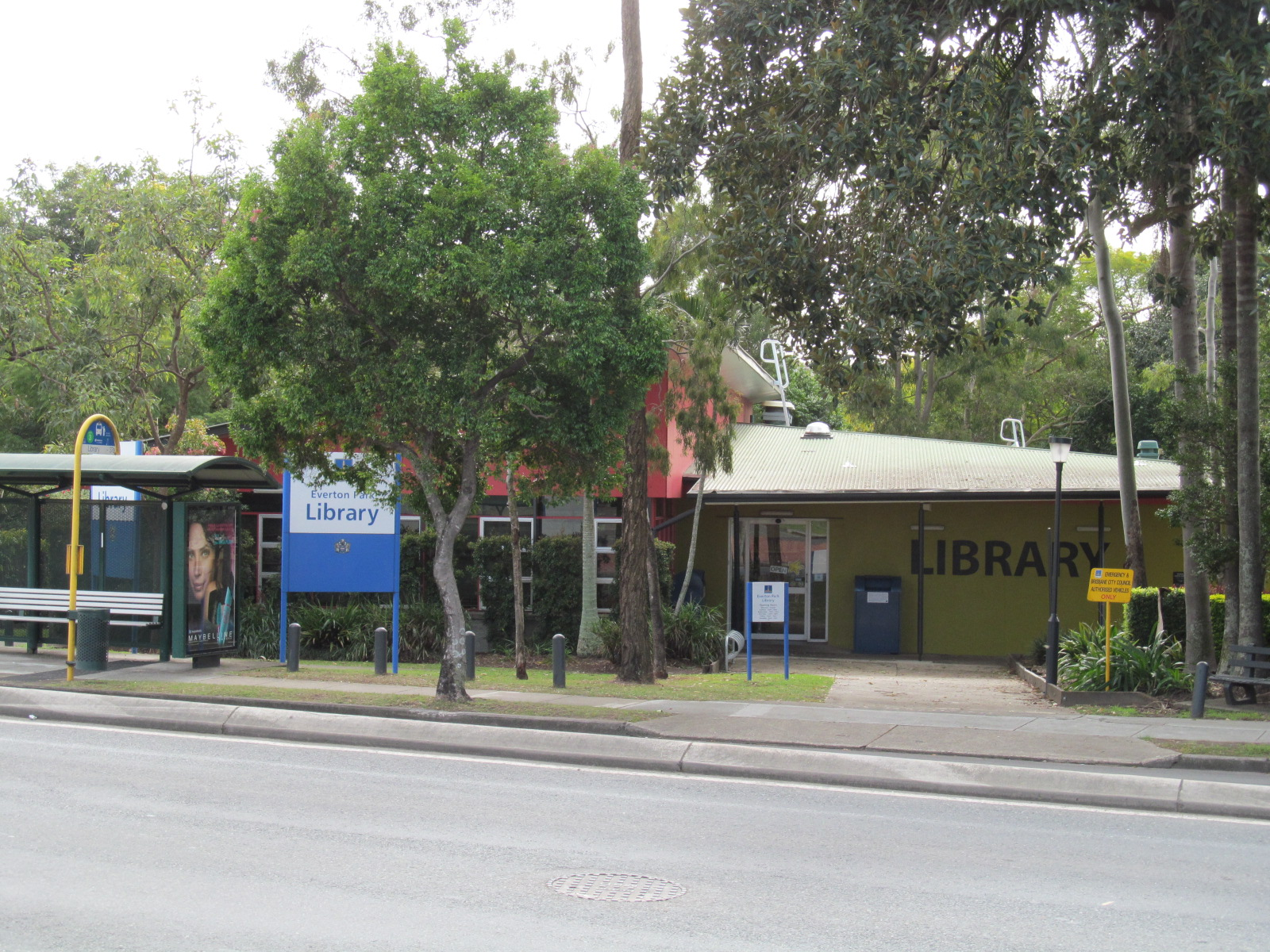
Former Everton Park Library, 2013

The Everton Park Library opened in 1965 at 561 South Pine Road (27.40546°S 152.99039°E). In 2024, the library relocated to a new building at 573 South Pine Road (27.40501°S 152.98999°E) with an opening ceremony on 9 March 2024.

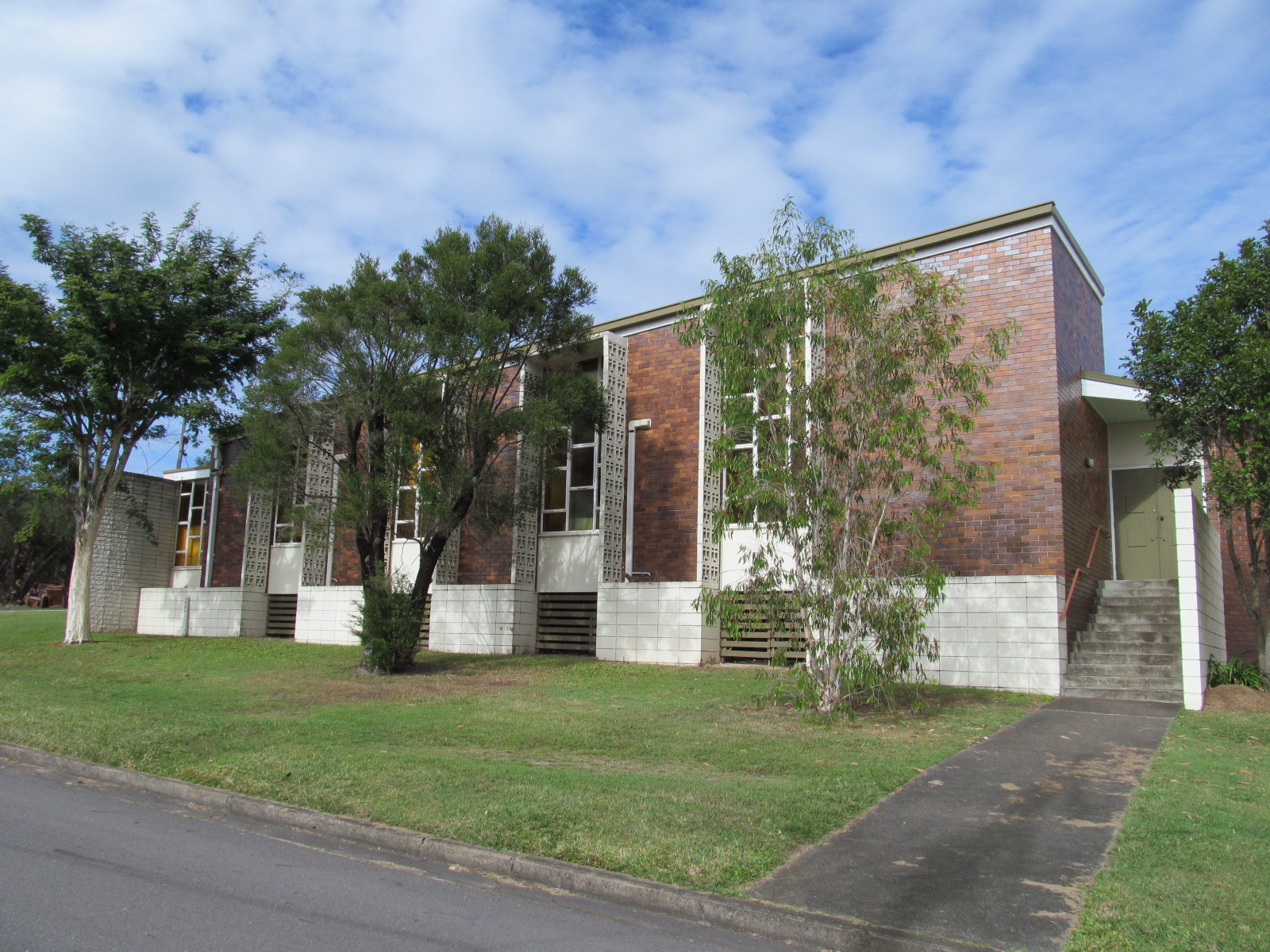
St Jude's Anglican Church, 2013

St Jude's Anglican Church at 27 Mcilwraith Street (27.4060°S 152.9888°E) was dedicated in 1978 by Archbishop Felix Arnott. Its closure circa 2012 was approved by Archbishop Phillip Aspinall. The Brisbane Brass Music Association now occupy the church building.

Prince of Peace Lutheran College opened on 3 January 1984.

Northside Christian College opened on 28 January 1985.

In July 2024, a married couple living in Everton Park were charged with preparing for an espionage offence. The wife was on long-term leave from the Australian defence force. Reece Kershaw of the Australian Federal Police alleged that they "worked together to access Australian Defence Force material that related to Australia’s national security interests”. The AFP were not able to confirm whether the information they gathered was handed over to Russian authorities.

== Demographics ==
In the 2011 census, the population of Everton Park was 8,325 people, 51.2% female and 48.8% male. The median age of the Everton Park population was 37 years of age, the same as the national median. 77.5% of people living in Everton Park were born in Australia, compared to the national average of 69.8%; the next-most-common countries of birth were England 2.7%, New Zealand 2.4%, India 1.1%, Italy 0.9%, Scotland 0.8%. 85.9% of people spoke only English at home; the next-most-spoken languages were 1.6% Italian, 0.6% Cantonese, 0.5% German, 0.5% Mandarin, 0.4% Hindi.

In the 2016 census, Everton Park had a population of 8,862 people.

In the 2021 census, Everton Park had a population of 10,111 people.

== Education ==
Everton Park State School is a government primary (Prep–6) school for boys and girls at Deakin Street (27.3983°S 152.9855°E). In 2017, the school had an enrolment of 497 students with 38 teachers (35 full-time equivalent) and 25 non-teaching staff (14 full-time equivalent). It includes a special education program.

Everton Park State High School is a government secondary (7–12) school for boys and girls at 668 Stafford Road (27.4076°S 152.9975°E). In 2017, the school had an enrolment of 293 students with 34 teachers (30 full-time equivalent) and 26 non-teaching staff (16 full-time equivalent). It includes a special education program.

Prince of Peace Lutheran College is a private primary (Prep–6) school for boys and girls at 20 Rogers Parade West (27.3923°S 152.9779°E). It has its secondary campus in Everton Hills. In 2017, the school had an enrolment of 761 students with 63 teachers (53 full-time equivalent) and 70 non-teaching staff (33 full-time equivalent).

Northside Christian College is a private primary and secondary (Prep–12) school for boys and girls at 151 Flockton Street (27.3942°S 152.9905°E). In 2017, the school had an enrolment of 1,136 students with 102 teachers (87 full-time equivalent) and 93 non-teaching staff (55 full-time equivalent).

== Transport ==
South Pine Road and Old Northern Road are both major transport corridors that run through the suburb towards Brisbane. They are serviced by several Transport for Brisbane bus services. Many commuters also drive or cycle to nearby railway stations at Gaythorne, Mitchelton and Oxford Park. There are also many local bikeways.

On the day of the 2011 census, 15.6% of employed people travelled to work on public transport and 62.0% by car (either as driver or as passenger).

In 2012, the Qld Department of Transport and Main Roads announced plans to provide new transit lanes on Stafford Road between Everton Park and Kedron and a new bikeway that would provide a direct east–west route along Stafford Road, between Everton Park and Kedron. The overall plan aimed to improve east–west capacity, connecting the north-western suburbs with the Australia TradeCoast.

== Amenities ==
Nearby Mitchelton, contains Brookside Shopping Centre, the major retail centre of the area; however, several retail services are available along South Pine Road, including the North-West Homemaker Centre, which includes the only Spotlight and Harvey Norman in the north-west district. A community-based shopping centre with a Coles supermarket and specialty stores is also located at the intersection of South Pine and Stafford Roads.

The Brisbane City Council operates the Everton Park public library at 573 South Pine Road.

Everton Park is a Neighbourhood Watch area.

=== Parks ===
There are a number of parks in the area:

- Ballinderry Street Park (27.3976°S 152.9830°E)
- Brook Street Park (27.4102°S 152.9873°E)
- Burwood Road Park (27.4102°S 152.9865°E)
- Fallon Park (27.4045°S 152.9904°E)
- John Tucker Park (27.3935°S 152.9783°E)
- Kitto Court Park (27.3914°S 152.9808°E)
- Longland Street Park (27.4105°S 152.9988°E)
- Lyell Crescent Park (27.3925°S 152.9890°E)
- Old Northern Rd (no 128) Park (27.3936°S 152.9847°E)
- Pullen Road Park (27.4033°S 152.9786°E)
- Soames Street Park (27.3914°S 152.9824°E)
- Teralba Park (27.4053°S 152.9815°E)
