= Frederick Annand =

Australian businessman and soldier

Frederick William Gadsby Annand
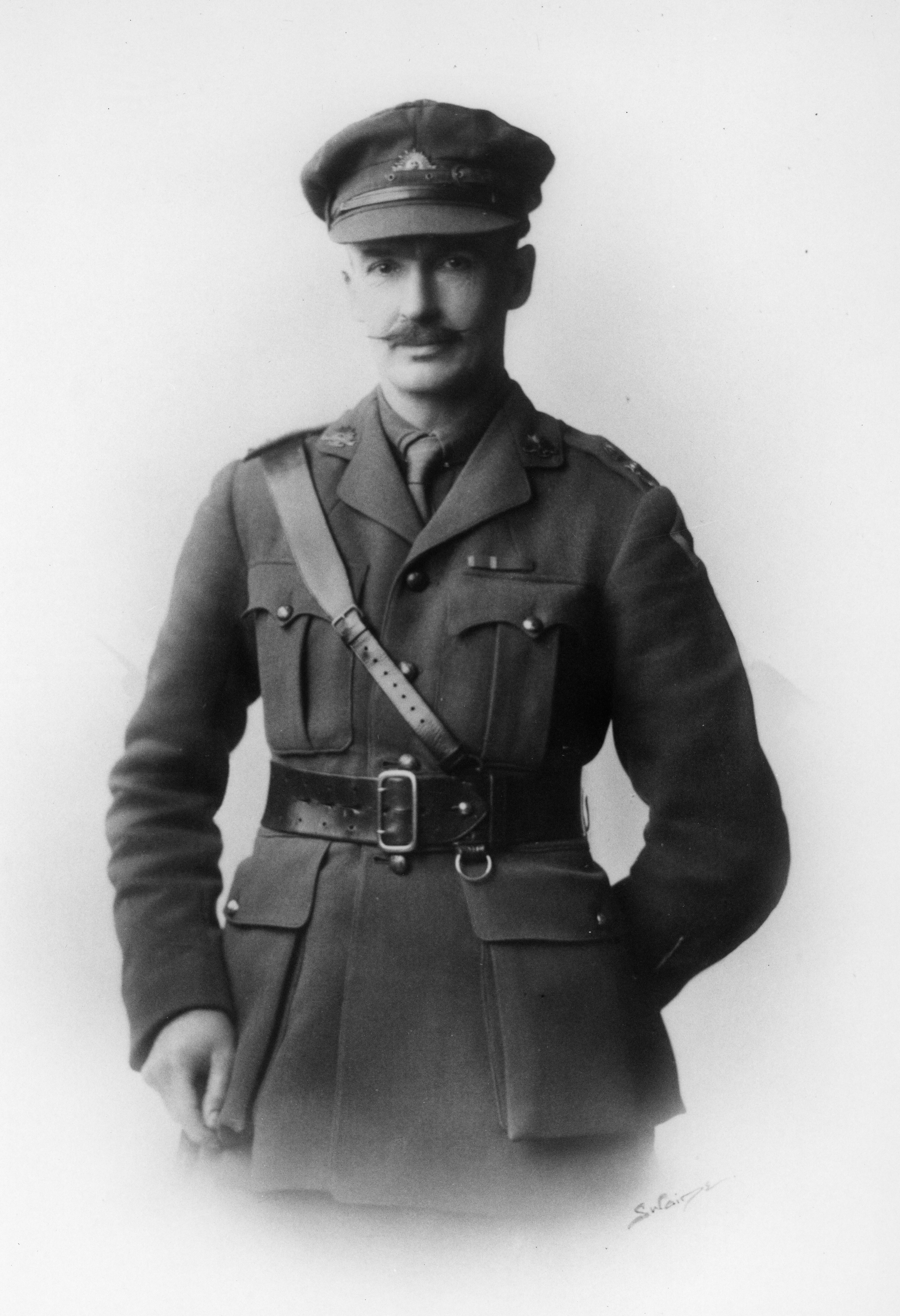
- Colonel Frederick William Gasby Annand
- Born: 7 May 1872; Toowoomba, Queensland
- Died: 22 June 1958 (aged 86); Ascot, Queensland
- Relatives: Douglas Annand (son)
- Military career
- Allegiance: Australia
- Branch: Citizen Military Forces
- Service years: 1897–1932
- Rank: Colonel
- Commands: 7th Brigade; 15th Battalion; 2nd Pioneer Battalion
- Conflicts: First World War
- Awards: Distinguished Service Order & Bar; Mentioned in Despatches (4); Volunteer Officers' Decoration

Colonel Frederick William Gadsby Annand, DSO & Bar, VD (7 May 1872 – 22 June 1958) was an Australian businessman and soldier.

== Early life ==
Annand was born at Toowoomba on 7 May 1872 to rural worker James Annand and Harriet, née Gadsby. He attended local state schools.

== Business career ==
Annand worked for the Australian Mutual Provident Society and on stations in the Warrego region. In 1895 he formed an agency in Toowoomba and in 1899 established an accounting form, gaining a licence as an auditor. On 1 June 1898 he married Helen Alice Robinson. In 1905 he was appointed to manage the Brisbane Permanent Building and Banking Company (which would become the Bank of Queensland), which he restored to profit.

== Military career ==
In 1897 he had joined the Queensland Defence Force, becoming a lieutenant with the Mounted Infantry. He joined the Royal Australian Engineers in 1905 and was promoted captain of the 5th Field Company; in 1911 he became a major with the 3rd Field Company.

During the First World War he commanded the 7th Field Company, Royal Australian Engineers and was promoted lieutenant colonel in March 1916, after which he commanded the 2nd Australian Pioneer Battalion. Mentioned in despatches four times and awarded a Distinguished Service Order (December 1916) and bar (October 1918), he returned from the war to command the Citizen Military Force's 15th Battalion. The citation for his bar, gazetted in December 1919, reads:

On Montbrehain, east of Peronne, on 5th October, 1918, in charge of a pioneer battalion, he succeeded in carrying out a very difficult relief in pitch darkness. A few hours after this he ably carried out a flanking movement to the attack on the town of Montbrehain, driving back the enemy and ensuring a defence which proved to be unbreakable. His reconnaissances had to be carried out under heavy shell fire. He showed rare qualities of leadership.

Promoted to colonel in 1926, he retired from active service in May 1932.

== Public life ==
A councillor and mayor (1924) of Hamilton, in 1925 Annand was appointed town clerk of Greater Brisbane. He resigned in 1931 in frustration after disputes with A. E. Moore's government and returned to the Building and Banking Company, of which he was elected director. He was president of the local Young Men's Christian Association, the Brisbane Rotary Club and deacon of the City Congregational Church.

== Later life ==
Annand died on 22 June 1958 at Ascot. He was buried in a family grave at Toowong Cemetery on 23 June 1958. His son Douglas Annand was a well-known artist.

== Legacy ==
Frederick Annand Park at 53 Milburn Street at Chermside West (27.3787°S 153.0189°E) was named after him.
