= Everton Park State High School =

Secondary school in Brisbane, Australia

Location
- Brisbane, QLD; Australia; 27.4082°S 152.9976°E

Information
- Type: Co-ed state senior
- Motto: Creating Bright Futures
- Established: 1961
- Principal: Rick O'Connor
- Teaching staff: 58 (2023)
- Grades: 7–12
- Enrolment: 496 (2023)
- Campus: Everton Park
- Website: Official site

Everton Park State High School is an independent public co-educational secondary school located in the Brisbane suburb of Everton Park, Queensland, Australia. It is administered by the Queensland Department of Education, with an enrolment of 496 students and a teaching staff of 58, as of 2023. The school serves students from Year 7 to Year 12, and the Metropolitan Region Music Resource Centre is co-located with the school.

== History ==
The Queensland Government gazettal proclamation of 22 September 1960 announced that the school would be opening at the beginning of 1961, but it was to be named Stafford State High School. It was renamed to its current name on 8 December 1960 and opened on 23 January 1961.

Despite the growth of the Everton Park area, the Queensland Government revealed plans to close the school, along with eight others in 2013. However, by September of the very same year, it was revealed that the school would not be closing, which was a relief to the school community.

== Demographics ==
In 2023, the school had a student enrolment of 496 with 58 teachers (53.5 full-time equivalent) and 38 non-teaching staff (23.9 full-time equivalent). Female enrolments consisted of 237 students and Male enrolments consisted of 259 students; Indigenous enrolments accounted for a total of 8% and 18% of students had a language background other than English.

== Notable alumni ==
- Adrian Lam, Australian rugby league football coach and former international player
- Michelle and Rodney Martin, professional squash players
- Geoffrey Rush, Academy Award-winning actor (1964–1968)
- Glenn Wheatley, talent manager and musician (1961–1963)

== See also ==
- Education in Queensland
- List of schools in Greater Brisbane
