= Craigslea State High School =

Location
- Chermside West, Queensland; Australia; 27°22′59.91″S 153°0′55.79″E

Information
- Type: Public, secondary
- Established: 1975
- Principal: Mick Leigh
- Grades: 7–12
- Enrolment: 1250
- Colours: Green and white
- Website: https://craigsleashs.eq.edu.au

Craigslea State High School is a public, co-educational, high school, located in the Brisbane suburb of Chermside West, in Queensland, Australia. It is administered by the Department of Education, with an enrolment of 1250 students and a teaching staff of 105, as of 2023. The school serves students from Year 7 to Year 12.

== History ==
The school opened on 28 January 1975, and was officially opened in 2000 by the then minister of Education, Dean Wells.

Enrolments for each year level in February 2019 totalled between 108 (Year 12) and 200 (Year 7) students, giving in the school a total population of 1,003 students. According to the Census (August) enrolment collection, the school's student population ranged between 970 and 994 from 2015 to 2018.

== Facilities ==
It is the first completely low-set public secondary school in Queensland.

As of 2015, the school's facilities included, a film and television studio, an indoor sport centre, an auditorium, a commercial kitchen and restaurant, an international student centre, volleyball courts and a swimming pool.

== Curriculum ==
The school has an international student program, music program, and marine biology programs.

== Notable alumni ==
- Benjamin Bell, volleyballer

== See also ==
- List of schools in Queensland
- Queensland State High Schools
