= Electoral results for the district of Aspley =

Queensland, Australia, district election results

This is a list of electoral results for the electoral district of Aspley in Queensland state elections.

== Members for Aspley ==
Member	Party	Term
Fred Campbell	Liberal	1960–1980
Beryce Nelson	Liberal	1980–1983
Brian Cahill	National	1983–1986
Beryce Nelson	National	1986–1989
John Goss	Liberal	1989–2001
Bonny Barry	Labor	2001–2009
Tracy Davis	Liberal National	2009–2017
Bart Mellish	Labor	2017–present

== Election results ==
=== Elections in the 2020s ===
2024 Queensland state election: Aspley
Party	Candidate	Votes	%	±%
Liberal National	Amanda Cooper	15,696	43.91	+3.41
Labor	Bart Mellish	13,988	39.13	−6.38
Greens	Fiona Hawkins	3,817	10.68	+1.74
One Nation	Allan Hall	1,539	4.30	+0.90
Family First	Wayne Capell	707	1.98	+1.98
Total formal votes		35,747	96.96	−0.96
Informal votes		1,119	3.04	+0.96
Turnout		36,866	92.17	+1.57
Two-party-preferred result
Labor	Bart Mellish	17,889	50.04	−5.12
Liberal National	Amanda Cooper	17,858	49.96	+5.12
Labor hold		Swing	–5.12	

2020 Queensland state election: Aspley
Party	Candidate	Votes	%	±%
Labor	Bart Mellish	15,261	45.51	+8.00
Liberal National	Amanda Cooper	13,579	40.50	+0.77
Greens	James Hansen	2,997	8.94	−0.52
One Nation	Walter Hardy	1,141	3.40	−6.19
Civil Liberties & Motorists	Neil Skilbeck	305	0.91	−0.52
United Australia	Joshua Morrison	247	0.74	+0.74
Total formal votes		33,530	97.92	+1.75
Informal votes		711	2.08	−1.75
Turnout		34,241	90.60	+0.06
Two-party-preferred result
Labor	Bart Mellish	18,494	55.16	+3.99
Liberal National	Amanda Cooper	15,036	44.84	−3.99
Labor hold		Swing	+3.99	

=== Elections in the 2010s ===
2017 Queensland state election: Aspley
Party	Candidate	Votes	%	±%
Liberal National	Tracy Davis	12,757	39.7	−10.3
Labor	Bart Mellish	12,046	37.5	−1.8
One Nation	Shaun Byrne	3,081	9.6	+9.6
Greens	James Hansen	3,037	9.5	−0.1
Independent	Zachary King	494	1.5	+1.5
Consumer Rights	Neil Skilbeck	458	1.4	+1.4
Independent	Steve Ross	235	0.7	+0.7
Total formal votes		32,108	96.2	−2.1
Informal votes		1,278	3.8	+2.1
Turnout		33,386	90.5	−0.7
Two-party-preferred result
Labor	Bart Mellish	16,430	51.2	+4.3
Liberal National	Tracy Davis	15,678	48.8	−4.3
Labor gain from Liberal National		Swing	+4.3	

2015 Queensland state election: Aspley
Party	Candidate	Votes	%	±%
Liberal National	Tracy Davis	14,868	52.41	−13.02
Labor	Gayle Dallaston	10,835	38.20	+14.65
Greens	Noel Clothier	2,663	9.39	+1.96
Total formal votes		28,366	98.28	−0.12
Informal votes		497	1.72	+0.12
Turnout		28,863	91.95	−2.47
Two-party-preferred result
Liberal National	Tracy Davis	15,276	55.17	−16.58
Labor	Gayle Dallaston	12,412	44.83	+16.58
Liberal National hold		Swing	−16.58	

2012 Queensland state election: Aspley
Party	Candidate	Votes	%	±%
Liberal National	Tracy Davis	17,923	65.43	+15.45
Labor	Oskar Bronowicki	6,449	23.54	−17.27
Greens	David Forrest	2,035	7.43	+0.58
Family First	Allan Vincent	985	3.60	+1.24
Total formal votes		27,392	98.40	−0.10
Informal votes		445	1.60	+0.10
Turnout		27,837	94.42	+1.29
Two-party-preferred result
Liberal National	Tracy Davis	18,718	71.75	+17.29
Labor	Oskar Bronowicki	7,370	28.25	−17.29
Liberal National hold		Swing	+17.29	

=== Elections in the 2000s ===
2009 Queensland state election: Aspley
Party	Candidate	Votes	%	±%
Liberal National	Tracy Davis	13,400	50.0	+7.1
Labor	Bonny Barry	10,940	40.8	−7.0
Greens	Peter Jeremijenko	1,836	6.8	+0.2
Family First	Allan Vincent	633	2.4	+1.6
Total formal votes		26,809	98.4	
Informal votes		407	1.6	
Turnout		27,216	93.1	
Two-party-preferred result
Liberal National	Tracy Davis	14,083	54.5	+7.5
Labor	Bonny Barry	11,775	45.5	−7.5
Liberal National gain from Labor		Swing	+7.5	

2006 Queensland state election: Aspley
Party	Candidate	Votes	%	±%
Labor	Bonny Barry	12,714	49.5	−0.8
Liberal	Tracy Davis	10,730	41.7	−1.2
Greens	James White	1,710	6.7	−0.1
Independent	Bruce Kent	555	2.2	+2.2
Total formal votes		25,709	98.3	−0.0
Informal votes		442	1.7	+0.0
Turnout		26,151	92.4	−0.9
Two-party-preferred result
Labor	Bonny Barry	13,507	54.6	+0.3
Liberal	Tracy Davis	11,226	45.4	−0.3
Labor hold		Swing	+0.3	

2004 Queensland state election: Aspley
Party	Candidate	Votes	%	±%
Labor	Bonny Barry	12,682	50.3	−4.4
Liberal	Trevor Nelson-Jones	10,811	42.9	−2.4
Greens	Dennis Delalande	1,721	6.8	+6.8
Total formal votes		25,214	98.3	+1.4
Informal votes		427	1.7	−1.4
Turnout		25,641	93.3	−0.8
Two-party-preferred result
Labor	Bonny Barry	13,306	54.3	−0.4
Liberal	Trevor Nelson-Jones	11,191	45.7	+0.4
Labor hold		Swing	−0.4	

2001 Queensland state election: Aspley
Party	Candidate	Votes	%	±%
Labor	Bonny Barry	13,150	54.7	+6.7
Liberal	John Goss	10,894	45.3	−6.7
Total formal votes		24,044	96.9	
Informal votes		770	3.1	
Turnout		24,814	94.1	
Labor gain from Liberal		Swing	+6.7	

=== Elections in the 1990s ===
1998 Queensland state election: Aspley
Party	Candidate	Votes	%	±%
Liberal	John Goss	9,801	39.8	−11.9
Labor	Steve Davey	9,732	39.5	+0.8
One Nation	Ron Eaton	3,763	15.3	+15.3
Greens	Alison Green	712	2.9	+2.9
Democrats	Bruce Kent	514	2.1	−3.9
Reform	Tony Argent	124	0.5	+0.5
Total formal votes		24,646	98.8	+0.3
Informal votes		304	1.2	−0.3
Turnout		24,950	93.8	
Two-party-preferred result
Liberal	John Goss	11,923	51.8	−5.1
Labor	Steve Davey	11,106	48.2	+5.1
Liberal hold		Swing	−5.1	

1995 Queensland state election: Aspley
Party	Candidate	Votes	%	±%
Liberal	John Goss	11,420	51.7	+9.3
Labor	Madonna Jarrett	8,543	38.6	−8.9
Democrats	Tanya Price	1,319	6.0	+6.0
Independent	Jeff Gehrmann	828	3.7	+3.7
Total formal votes		22,110	98.5	+0.5
Informal votes		331	1.5	−0.5
Turnout		22,441	94.0	
Two-party-preferred result
Liberal	John Goss	12,397	56.9	+5.9
Labor	Madonna Jarrett	9,398	43.1	−5.9
Liberal hold		Swing	+5.9	

1992 Queensland state election: Aspley
Party	Candidate	Votes	%	±%
Labor	Terry Hampson	9,462	47.6	−1.4
Liberal	John Goss	8,425	42.3	+10.1
National	Mike Sopinski	2,007	10.1	−5.4
Total formal votes		19,894	98.1	
Informal votes		391	1.9	
Turnout		20,285	93.4	
Two-party-preferred result
Liberal	John Goss	10,030	50.9	+2.0
Labor	Terry Hampson	9,663	49.1	−2.0
Liberal gain from Labor		Swing	+2.0	

=== Elections in the 1980s ===
1989 Queensland state election: Aspley
Party	Candidate	Votes	%	±%
Labor	Noela Pemberton	9,130	46.4	+10.7
Liberal	John Goss	6,763	34.4	+5.0
National	Beryce Nelson	2,978	15.1	−16.2
Call to Australia	Eric Raetz	521	2.6	+2.6
Independent	Ian Webster	269	1.4	+1.4
Total formal votes		19,661	97.7	−0.6
Informal votes		470	2.3	+0.6
Turnout		20,131	93.3	+0.1
Two-party-preferred result
Liberal	John Goss	10,063	51.2	+51.2
Labor	Noela Pemberton	9,598	48.8	+2.9
Liberal gain from National		Swing	+51.2	

1986 Queensland state election: Aspley
Party	Candidate	Votes	%	±%
Labor	Joe Marney	6,676	35.7	+1.6
National	Beryce Nelson	5,867	31.3	−5.8
Liberal	Scott McLeay	5,493	29.3	+0.4
Independent	Patrick Blake	681	3.6	+3.6
Total formal votes		18,717	98.3	−0.6
Informal votes		316	1.7	+0.6
Turnout		19,033	93.2	−0.3
Two-party-preferred result
National	Beryce Nelson	10,127	54.1	−6.3
Labor	Joe Marney	8,590	45.9	+6.3
National hold		Swing	−6.3	

1983 Queensland state election: Aspley
Party	Candidate	Votes	%	±%
National	Brian Cahill	6,766	37.1	+5.4
Labor	D.K. O'Connell	6,224	34.1	+6.1
Liberal	Beryce Nelson	5,269	28.9	−2.1
Total formal votes		18,259	98.9	+0.4
Informal votes		205	1.1	+0.4
Turnout		18,464	93.6	+3.2
Two-party-preferred result
National	Brian Cahill	11,033	60.4	+24.4
Labor	D.K. O'Connell	7,226	39.6	+39.6
National gain from Liberal		Swing	+24.4	

1980 Queensland state election: Aspley
Party	Candidate	Votes	%	±%
National	Leonard Brydges	5,259	31.7	+31.7
Liberal	Beryce Nelson	5,143	31.0	−30.5
Labor	John Duncan	4,646	28.0	−10.5
Democrats	Leslie Mundt	1,428	8.6	+8.6
Progress	Gregory Curry	129	0.8	+0.8
Total formal votes		16,605	98.5	−0.2
Informal votes		254	1.5	+0.2
Turnout		16,859	90.4	−2.6
Two-candidate-preferred result
Liberal	Beryce Nelson	10,619	63.9	+2.4
National	Leonard Brydges	5,986	36.1	+36.1
Liberal hold		Swing	N/A	

=== Elections in the 1970s ===
1977 Queensland state election: Aspley
Party	Candidate	Votes	%	±%
Liberal	Fred Campbell	9,237	61.5	−11.6
Labor	Philip Gray	5,789	38.5	+11.6
Total formal votes		15,026	98.7	
Informal votes		198	1.3	
Turnout		15,224	93.0	
Liberal hold		Swing	−11.6	

1974 Queensland state election: Aspley
Party	Candidate	Votes	%	±%
Liberal	Fred Campbell	10,307	73.1	+21.8
Labor	John Steensen	3,786	26.9	−13.4
Total formal votes		14,093	98.9	−0.1
Informal votes		156	1.1	+0.1
Turnout		14,249	91.0	−3.2
Liberal hold		Swing	+14.8	

1972 Queensland state election: Aspley
Party	Candidate	Votes	%	±%
Liberal	Fred Campbell	6,169	51.3	+2.9
Labor	John Steensen	4,841	40.3	−2.5
Queensland Labor	Noel Hutchinson	1,003	8.4	−0.4
Total formal votes		12,013	99.0	
Informal votes		124	1.0	
Turnout		12,137	94.2	
Two-party-preferred result
Liberal	Fred Campbell	7,002	58.3	+0.1
Labor	John Steensen	5,011	41.7	−0.1
Liberal hold		Swing	+0.1	

=== Elections in the 1960s ===
1969 Queensland state election: Aspley
Party	Candidate	Votes	%	±%
Liberal	Fred Campbell	9,342	48.4	−4.0
Labor	William Harvey	8,255	42.8	+3.9
Queensland Labor	Anthony Macklin	1,700	8.8	+0.1
Total formal votes		19,019	98.6	−0.2
Informal votes		278	1.4	+0.2
Turnout		19,297	93.3	−1.0
Two-party-preferred result
Liberal	Fred Campbell	10,713	55.5	−4.0
Labor	William Harvey	8,584	44.5	+4.0
Liberal hold		Swing	−4.0	

1966 Queensland state election: Aspley
Party	Candidate	Votes	%	±%
Liberal	Fred Campbell	8,633	52.4	+1.4
Labor	John Purtell	6,408	38.9	−0.8
Queensland Labor	Rogers Judge	1,444	8.7	−0.7
Total formal votes		16,485	98.8	−0.3
Informal votes		191	1.2	+0.3
Turnout		16,676	94.3	−1.0
Two-party-preferred result
Liberal	Fred Campbell	9,808	59.5	+0.6
Labor	John Purtell	6,677	40.5	−0.6
Liberal hold		Swing	+0.6	

1963 Queensland state election: Aspley
Party	Candidate	Votes	%	±%
Liberal	Fred Campbell	6,613	51.0	+3.9
Labor	Edward Humbler	5,145	39.7	−0.5
Queensland Labor	Brian Balaam	1,219	9.4	−3.3
Total formal votes		12,977	99.1	+0.4
Informal votes		119	0.9	−0.4
Turnout		13,096	95.3	+1.3
Two-party-preferred result
Liberal	Fred Campbell	7,639	58.9	
Labor	Edward Humbler	5,338	41.1	
Liberal hold		Swing	N/A	

1960 Queensland state election: Aspley
Party	Candidate	Votes	%	±%
Liberal	Fred Campbell	4,967	47.1	+4.3
Labor	Nellie Carver	4,239	40.2	+4.6
Queensland Labor	George Kerr	1,336	12.7	−8.9
Total formal votes		10,542	98.7	
Informal votes		133	1.3	
Turnout		10,675	94.0	
Liberal hold		Swing	−1.4	
