= Results of the 2016 Queensland local elections =

This is a list of local government area results for the 2016 Queensland local elections.

== Brisbane ==
2016 Queensland local elections: Brisbane
Party	Votes	%	Swing	Seats	Change
Liberal National	303,055	49.88	−7.2	19	▲1
Labor	201,835	33.22	+1.2	5	▼2
Greens	88,008	14.49	+6.0	1	▲1
Independent	13,522	2.22	−0.20	1	Steady
People Decide	1,155	0.19	+0.19	0	Steady
Formal votes	607,575				

=== Bracken Ridge ===
2016 Queensland local elections: Bracken Ridge Ward
Party	Candidate	Votes	%	±%
Liberal National	Amanda Cooper	13,669	56.6	−10.4
Labor	Cath Palmer	8,352	34.6	+9.3
Greens	Keith Skelton	2,120	8.8	+1.1
Total formal votes		24,141	-	−
Informal votes		688	-	−
Turnout		24,829	-	−
Two-party-preferred result
Liberal National	Amanda Cooper	13,989	60.6	−11.1
Labor	Cath Palmer	9,101	39.4	+11.1
Liberal National hold		Swing	−11.1	

=== Central ===
2016 Queensland local elections: Central Ward
Party	Candidate	Votes	%	±%
Liberal National	Vicki Howard	10,430	50.84	–0.60
Labor	Amber Hawkins	5,471	26.67	–3.82
Greens	Kirsten Lovejoy	4,614	22.49	+4.42
Total formal votes		20,515	97.70	–0.47
Informal votes		484	2.30	+0.47
Turnout		20,999	75.43	+1.42
Two-party-preferred result
Liberal National	Vicki Howard	10,878	58.21	–0.44
Labor	Amber Hawkins	7,808	41.79	+0.44
Liberal National hold		Swing	–0.44	

=== Chandler ===
2016 Queensland local elections:Chandler Ward
Party	Candidate	Votes	%	±%
Liberal National	Adrian Schrinner	15,591	70.2	–6.5
Labor	Torryn Saker	4,755	21.4	–1.8
Greens	Geoff Ebbs	1,865	8.4	+8.4
Total formal votes		22,211	97.9	+0.1
Informal votes		477	2.1	–0.1
Turnout		22,688	-	−
Two-party-preferred result
Liberal National	Adrian Schrinner	15,867	74.6	–2.2
Labor	Torryn Saker	5,390	25.4	+2.2
Liberal National hold		Swing	–2.2	

=== Calamvale ===
2016 Queensland local elections:Calamvale Ward
Party	Candidate	Votes	%	±%
Liberal National	Angela Owen-Taylor	13,799	59.6	−8.4
Labor	Mukhtar Wesseh	7,004	30.3	−1.4
Greens	Janina Leo	2,332	10.1	+10.1
Total formal votes		23,135	-	−
Informal votes		822	-	−
Turnout		23,957	-	−
Two-party-preferred result
Liberal National	Angela Owen-Taylor	14,051	64.7	−3.4
Labor	Mukhtar Wesseh	7,653	35.3	+3.4
Liberal National hold		Swing	−3.4	

=== Coorparoo ===
2016 Queensland local elections: Coorparoo Ward
Party	Candidate	Votes	%	±%
Liberal National	Ian McKenzie	10,774	46.6	−9.2
Labor	Matt Campbell	8,157	35.3	+4.1
Greens	David Hale	3,567	15.4	+4.3
People Decide	Grigory Graborenko	639	2.8	+2.8
Total formal votes		20,515	-	−
Informal votes		662	-	−
Turnout		23,137	-	−
Two-party-preferred result
Liberal National	Ian McKenzie	11,117	53.0	−9.2
Labor	Matt Campbell	9,875	47.0	+9.2
Liberal National hold		Swing	−9.2	

=== Deagon ===
2016 Queensland local elections: Deagon Ward
Party	Candidate	Votes	%	±%
Labor	Jared Cassidy	10,504	43.8	−4.9
Liberal National	Kerry Millard	10,095	42.1	+1.4
Greens	Anthony Walsh	3,359	14	+6.5
Total formal votes		23,958		
Informal votes		673		
Turnout		24,631		
Two-party-preferred result
Labor	Jared Cassidy	12,092	53.7	−1.4
Liberal National	Kerry Millard	10,406	46.3	+1.4
Labor hold		Swing	−1.4	

=== Enoggera ===
2016 Queensland local elections: Enoggera Ward
Party	Candidate	Votes	%	±%
Liberal National	Andrew Wines	12,235	49.6	−7.6
Labor	Amanda Ronan-Hearn	8,568	34.7	+6.8
Greens	Kirsty Ksiazek	3,872	15.7	+3.0
Total formal votes		24,675	-	−
Informal votes		561	-	−
Turnout		25,236	-	−
Two-party-preferred result
Liberal National	Andrew Wines	12,563	54.8	−9.4
Labor	Amanda Ronan-Hearn	10,378	45.2	+9.4
Liberal National hold		Swing	−1.2	

=== Hamilton ===
2016 Queensland local elections: Hamilton Ward
Party	Candidate	Votes	%	±%
Liberal National	David McLachlan	13,697	61.22	–6.42
Labor	Philip Anthony	5,461	24.41	+4.85
Greens	Rachel Hannam	3,216	14.37	+1.57
Total formal votes		22,374	79.26	+2.73
Informal votes		559	2.44	+0.33
Turnout		22,933	81.24	+3.06
Liberal National hold		Swing	N/A	

=== Forest Lake ===
2016 Queensland local elections: Forest Lake Ward
Party	Candidate	Votes	%	±%
Labor	Charles Strunk	11,553	49.2	−6.2
Liberal National	Leanne McFarlane	9,560	40.7	−4
Greens	Jenny Mulkearns	2,386	10.2	+10.2
Total formal votes		23,499	-	−
Informal votes		962	-	−
Turnout		24,461	-	−
Two-party-preferred result
Labor	Charles Strunk	12,235	55.3	0
Liberal National	Leanne McFarlane	9,886	44.7	0
Labor hold		Swing	0	

=== Holland Park ===
2016 Queensland local elections: Holland Park Ward
Party	Candidate	Votes	%	±%
Liberal National	Krista Adams	11,476	49.6	−4.1
Labor	Adam Obeid	8,246	35.6	+0.9
Greens	Karen Anderson	3,409	14.7	+3.2
Total formal votes		23,131	-	−
Informal votes		609	-	−
Turnout		23,740	-	−
Two-party-preferred result
Liberal National	Krista Adams	11,897	54.8	−4.0
Labor	Adam Obeid	9,820	45.2	+4.0
Liberal National hold		Swing	−4.0	

=== Jamboree ===
2016 Queensland local elections: Jamboree Ward
Party	Candidate	Votes	%	±%
Liberal National	Matthew Bourke	15,088	64.1	−3.7
Labor	Matthew Johns	5,763	24.5	−1.5
Greens	Dorotee Braun	2,684	11.4	+5.2
Total formal votes		23,535	-	−
Informal votes		602	-	−
Turnout		24,137	-	−
Two-party-preferred result
Liberal National	Matthew Bourke	15,476	69.1	−2
Labor	Matthew Johns	6,923	30.9	+2
Liberal National hold		Swing	−2	

=== MacGregor ===
2016 Queensland local elections: MacGregor Ward
Party	Candidate	Votes	%	±%
Liberal National	Steven Huang	13,017	57.6	−11.3
Labor	Tom Huang	6,748	29.9	+9
Greens	Patsy O'Brien	2,831	12.5	+5.1
Total formal votes		22,596	-	−
Informal votes		636	-	−
Turnout		23,232	-	−
Two-party-preferred result
Liberal National	Steven Huang	13,392	63.7	−11.4
Labor	Tom Huang	7,626	36.3	+11.4
Liberal National hold		Swing	−11.4	

=== Marchant ===
2016 Queensland local elections: Marchant Ward
Party	Candidate	Votes	%	±%
Liberal National	Fiona King	12,851	53.4	−7.9
Labor	Stephanie Serhan	8,121	33.7	+5.5
Greens	Richard Nielsen	3,107	12.9	+2.5
Total formal votes		24,079	-	−
Informal votes		627	-	−
Turnout		24,706	-	−
Two-party-preferred result
Liberal National	Fiona King	13,260	58.3	−8.2
Labor	Stephanie Serhan	9,496	41.7	+8.2
Liberal National hold		Swing	−8.2	

=== McDowall ===
2016 Queensland local elections: McDowall Ward
Party	Candidate	Votes	%	±%
Liberal National	Norm Wyndham	15,104	65.2	−8.3
Labor	Liam Culverhouse	7,337	29.6	+3.3
Greens	Joshua Sanderson	2,320	9.4	+9
Total formal votes		24,761	-	−
Informal votes		560	-	−
Turnout		25,321	-	−
Two-party-preferred result
Liberal National	Norm Wyndham	15,350	65.2	−8.3
Labor	Liam Culverhouse	8,193	34.8	+8.3
Liberal National hold		Swing	−8.3	

=== Moorooka ===
2016 Queensland local elections: Moorooka Ward
Party	Candidate	Votes	%	±%
Labor	Steve Griffiths	11,463	51.8	−2.2
Liberal National	Brett Gillespie	7,218	32.6	−3.8
Greens	Leo Campbell	3,446	15.6	+6.1
Total formal votes		22,127	-	−
Informal votes		760	-	−
Turnout		22,887	-	−
Two-party-preferred result
Labor	Steve Griffiths	13,085	63.7	+3
Liberal National	Brett Gillespie	7,469	36.3	−3
Labor hold		Swing	+3	

=== Northgate ===
2016 Queensland local elections: Northgate Ward
Party	Candidate	Votes	%	±%
Liberal National	Adam Allan	11,456	46.7	−3
Labor	Reg Neil	9,581	39	−11.3
Greens	James Davis	3,499	14.3	+14.3
Total formal votes		24,536	-	−
Informal votes		712	-	−
Turnout		25,248	-	−
Two-party-preferred result
Liberal National	Adam Allan	11,796	51.7	+2.1
Labor	Reg Neil	11,018	48.3	−2.1
Liberal National gain from Labor		Swing	+2.1	

=== Paddington ===
2016 Queensland local elections: Paddington Ward
Party	Candidate	Votes	%	±%
Liberal National	Peter Matic	11,326	48.9	−4.7
Greens	Michael Kane	6,328	27.3	+6.0
Labor	Jeff Eelkema	5,510	23.8	−1.3
Total formal votes		23,164	98.1	−0.2
Informal votes		437	1.9	+0.2
Turnout		23,601	78.6	+1.3
Notional two-party-preferred count
Liberal National	Peter Matic		57.3	
Labor	Jeff Eelkema		42.7	
Two-party-preferred result
Liberal National	Peter Matic	11,736	55.8	−6.1
Greens	Michael Kane	9,283	44.2	+6.1
Liberal National hold		Swing	−6.1	

=== Pullenvale ===
2016 Queensland local elections: Pullenvale Ward
Party	Candidate	Votes	%	±%
Liberal National	Kate Richards	15,366	60.5	−14.1
Greens	John Belchamber	5,419	21.3	+7.9
Labor	Catherine Abel	4,628	18.2	+6.2
Total formal votes		25,413	-	−
Informal votes		575	-	−
Turnout		25,988	-	−
Notional two-party-preferred count
Liberal National	Kate Richards		68.9	
Labor	Catherine Abel		31.1	
Two-party-preferred result
Liberal National	Kate Richards	15,794	68.1	−14.6
Greens	John Belchamber	7,391	31.9	+14.6
Liberal National hold		Swing	−14.6	

=== Runcorn ===
2016 Queensland local elections: Runcorn Ward
Party	Candidate	Votes	%	±%
Liberal National	Kim Marx	12,210	53.8	−10.9
Labor	Stanley Hsu	8,281	36.5	+7.2
Greens	Edward Starr	2,204	9.7	+6.7
Total formal votes		22,695	-	−
Informal votes		759	-	−
Turnout		23,454	-	−
Two-party-preferred result
Liberal National	Kim Marx	12,471	58	−10.3
Labor	Stanley Hsu	9,040	42	+10.3
Liberal National hold		Swing	−10.3	

=== Tennyson ===
2016 Queensland local elections: Tennyson Ward
Party	Candidate	Votes	%	±%
Independent	Nicole Johnston	12,572	55.4	+14.3
Liberal National	Ashley Higgins	3,794	16.7	−20.3
Labor	Stephen Harvey	3,335	14.7	+2.4
Greens	Gillian Marshall-Pierce	2,985	13.2	+3.5
Total formal votes		22,686	-	−
Informal votes		484	-	−
Turnout		23,170	-	−
Notional two-party-preferred count
Labor	Stephen Harvey		53.2	
Liberal National	Ashley Higgins		46.8	
Two-party-preferred result
Independent	Nicole Johnston	14,150	76.3	+20.5
Labor	Stephen Harvey	4,404	23.7	+23.7
Independent hold		Swing	+20.5	

=== The Gabba ===
2016 Queensland local elections: The Gabba Ward
Party	Candidate	Votes	%	±%
Liberal National	Sean Jacobs	7,712	35.9	–1.1
Greens	Jonathan Sri	6,823	31.7	+13.8
Labor	Nicole Lessio	6,457	30.0	–15.1
People Decide	Leon Lechner	516	2.4	+2.4
Total formal votes		21,508	97.1	–1.1
Informal votes		649	2.9	+1.1
Turnout		22,157	100	–
Notional two-party-preferred count
Labor	Nicole Lessio		58.4	–1.4
Liberal National	Sean Jacobs		41.6	+1.4
Two-party-preferred result
Greens	Jonathan Sri	10,194	55.0	+55.0
Liberal National	Sean Jacobs	8,336	45.0	+3.3
Greens gain from Labor		Swing	+55.0	

=== The Gap ===
2016 Queensland local elections: The Gap Ward
Party	Candidate	Votes	%	±%
Liberal National	Steve Toomey	12,903	50.6	−12.2
Labor	Shane Bevis	8,670	34	+13.3
Greens	Reece Walters	3,920	15.4	−0.4
Total formal votes		25,493	-	−
Informal votes		521	-	−
Turnout		26,014	-	−
Two-party-preferred result
Liberal National	Steve Toomey	13,356	55.7	−15.4
Labor	Shane Bevis	10,639	44.3	+15.4
Liberal National hold		Swing	−15.4	

=== Walter Taylor ===
2016 Queensland local elections: Walter Taylor Ward
Party	Candidate	Votes	%	±%
Liberal National	Julian Simmonds	14,190	60.5	−3.5
Greens	Chris Turnbull	5,354	22.8	+2.6
Labor	Talbot Speechley	3,920	16.7	+0.9
Total formal votes		23,464	98.1	−0.3
Informal votes		461	1.9	+0.3
Turnout		23,925	81.5	+2.4
Notional two-party-preferred count
Liberal National	Julian Simmonds		67.8	
Labor	Talbot Speechley		32.2	
Two-party-preferred result
Liberal National	Julian Simmonds	14,574	66.5	−7.2
Greens	Chris Turnbull	7,336	33.5	+7.2
Liberal National hold		Swing	−7.2	

=== Wynnum Manly ===
2016 Queensland local elections: Wynnum Manly Ward
Party	Candidate	Votes	%	±%
Labor	Peter Cumming	13,344	55.8	+13
Liberal National	Deirdre Thomson	8,574	35.9	−6.8
Greens	Sonja Gerdsen	1,990	8.3	+1.7
Total formal votes		23,908	-	−
Informal votes		576	-	−
Turnout		24,484	-	−
Two-party-preferred result
Labor	Peter Cumming	14,138	61.6	+10.9
Liberal National	Deirdre Thomson	8,827	38.4	−10.9
Labor hold		Swing	+10.9	

== Townsville ==
2016 Queensland local elections: Townsville
Party	Votes	%	Swing	Seats	Change
Team Jenny Hill	53,093	53.79		10	▲8
Jayne Arlett's Team	38,306	38.81	+38.81	0	Steady
Independent	7,297	7.39		0	▼1
Formal votes	98,696				

=== Division 1 ===
2016 Queensland local elections: Division 1
Party	Candidate	Votes	%	±%
Team Jenny Hill	Margie Ryder	5,786	58.30	
Jayne Arlett's Team	Tony Parsons	4,138	41.70	
Turnout		10,281	83.10	
Team Jenny Hill gain from Jayne Arlett's Team		Swing		

- Incumbent councillor Sue Blom (Townsville First, later Jayne Arlett's Team) contested Division 2

=== Division 2 ===
2016 Queensland local elections: Division 2
Party	Candidate	Votes	%	±%
Team Jenny Hill	Paul Jacob	5,485	56.83	
Jayne Arlett's Team	Sue Blom	4,167	43.17	
Turnout		10,052	80.42	
Team Jenny Hill gain from Jayne Arlett's Team		Swing		

- Incumbent councillor Tony Parsons (Townsville First, later Jayne Arlett's Team) contested Division 1

=== Division 3 ===
2016 Queensland local elections: Division 3
Party	Candidate	Votes	%	±%
Team Jenny Hill	Ann-Maree Greaney	4,292	45.68	
Jayne Arlett's Team	Gerry Maguire	2,839	30.22	
Independent	Vern Veitch	2,264	24.10	
Turnout		9,726	75.21	
Two-candidate-preferred result
Team Jenny Hill	Ann-Maree Greaney	4,590	59.65	
Jayne Arlett's Team	Gerry Maguire	3,105	40.35	
Team Jenny Hill gain from Independent		Swing		

- Incumbent councillor Vern Veitch moved from Townsville First to Independent

=== Division 4 ===
2016 Queensland local elections: Division 4
Party	Candidate	Votes	%	±%
Team Jenny Hill	Mark Molachino	4,181	42.88	
Jayne Arlett's Team	Marcel McLeod	2,581	26.47	
Independent	Joanne Keune	1,969	20.19	
Independent	Guy Reece	1,020	10.46	
Turnout		10,161	82.01	
Two-candidate-preferred result
Team Jenny Hill	Mark Molachino	5,023	62.35	
Jayne Arlett's Team	Marcel McLeod	3,033	37.65	
Team Jenny Hill gain from Townsville First		Swing		

- Incumbent councillor Jenny Lane (Townsville First) did not recontest

=== Division 5 ===
2016 Queensland local elections: Division 5
Party	Candidate	Votes	%	±%
Team Jenny Hill	Russ Cook	5,354	51.33	
Jayne Arlett's Team	Janelle Poole	4,281	41.04	
Independent	Craig Leonard	796	7.63	
Turnout		10,870	83.45	
Two-candidate-preferred result
Team Jenny Hill	Russ Cook	5,453	55.32	
Jayne Arlett's Team	Janelle Poole	4,404	44.68	
Team Jenny Hill gain from Independent		Swing		

- Incumbent councillor Pat Ernst (Independent) did not recontest

=== Division 6 ===
2016 Queensland local elections: Division 6
Party	Candidate	Votes	%	±%
Team Jenny Hill	Verena Coombe	5,158	52.42	
Jayne Arlett's Team	Trevor Roberts	4,681	47.58	
Turnout		10,138	79.45	
Team Jenny Hill gain from Jayne Arlett's Team		Swing		

- Incumbent councillor Trevor Roberts moved from Townsville First to Jayne Arlett's Team

=== Division 7 ===
2016 Queensland local elections: Division 7
Party	Candidate	Votes	%	±%
Team Jenny Hill	Kurt Rehbein	5,732	56.65	
Jayne Arlett's Team	Gary Eddiehausen	4,386	43.35	
Turnout		10,457	84.03	
Team Jenny Hill gain from Jayne Arlett's Team		Swing		

- Incumbent councillor Gary Eddiehausen moved from Townsville First to Jayne Arlett's Team

=== Division 8 ===
2016 Queensland local elections: Division 8
Party	Candidate	Votes	%	±%
Team Jenny Hill	Maurie Soars	4,445	46.91	
Jayne Arlett's Team	Ray Gartrell	4,357	45.98	
Independent	Gregory Wright	673	7.10	
Turnout		9,816	82.63	
Two-candidate-preferred result
Team Jenny Hill	Maurie Soars	4,532	50.27	
Jayne Arlett's Team	Ray Gartrell	4,483	49.73	
Team Jenny Hill gain from Jayne Arlett's Team		Swing		

- Incumbent councillor Ray Gartrell moved from Townsville First to Jayne Arlett's Team

=== Division 9 ===
2016 Queensland local elections: Division 9
Party	Candidate	Votes	%	±%
Team Jenny Hill	Colleen Doyle	5,910	64.13	
Jayne Arlett's Team	Muriel Bin Dol	3,306	35.87	
Turnout		9,541	78.54	
Team Jenny Hill hold		Swing		

=== Division 10 ===
2016 Queensland local elections: Division 10
Party	Candidate	Votes	%	±%
Team Jenny Hill	Les Walker	6,750	65.41	
Jayne Arlett's Team	Michael Charge	3,570	34.49	
Turnout		10,617	83.62	
Team Jenny Hill hold		Swing		
