= 1988 Brisbane City Council election =

Australian local election

- 19 March 1988
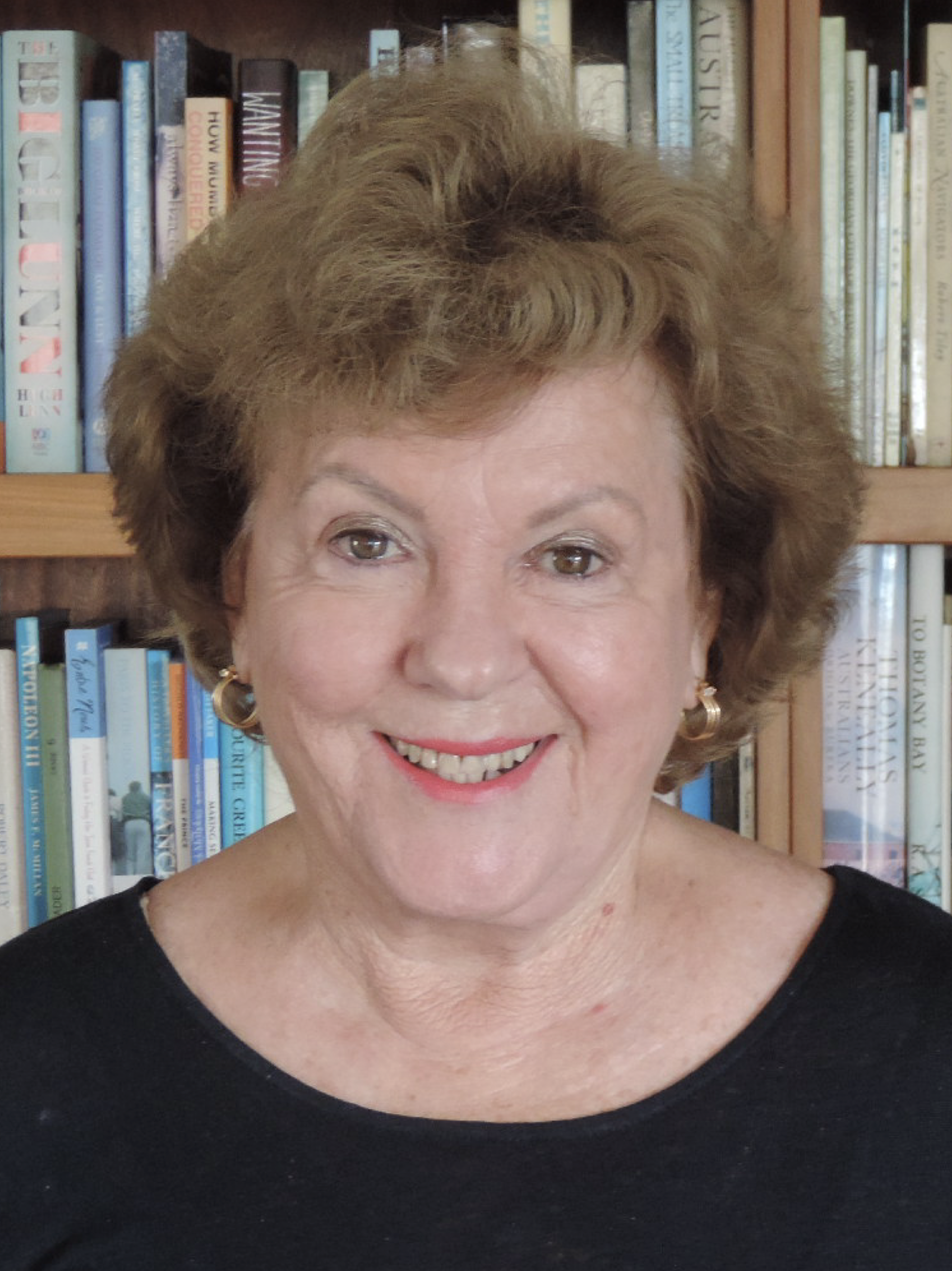

| | First party | Second party |
|---|---|---|
| Candidate | Sallyanne Atkinson | Jeannie Davis |
| Party | Liberal | Labor |
Lord Mayor before election
Sallyanne Atkinson
Liberal
Subsequent Lord Mayor
Sallyanne Atkinson
Liberal
- All 26 wards on the City Council; 13 wards needed for a majority
| Party | Leader | Vote % | Seats | +/– |
|---|---|---|---|---|
| Liberal | Sallyanne Atkinson | | 17 | +2 |
| Labor | Jeannie Davis | | 9 | −2 |
This lists parties that won seats. See the complete results below.

The 1988 Brisbane City Council election was held on 19 March 1988 to elect a lord mayor and 26 aldermen to the City of Brisbane. The election was held as part of the statewide local government elections in Queensland, Australia.

The election resulted in the re-election of the Liberal Party, with incumbent Liberal Lord Mayor Sallyanne Atkinson also being returned.

== Pendulums ==
=== Pre-Election Pendulum ===
Liberal wards (15)
Marginal
| Chermside | L. B. Barnes | 1.3% |
| Bracken Ridge | Keith Murray | 1.5% |
| Holland Park | Gail Chiconi | 2.4% |
| Camp Hill | S. R. Jeffreys | 2.7% |
Fairly safe
| Runcorn | Bob Ward | 5.1% |
| Fairfield | Norman Rose | 5.2% |
| Breakfast Creek | G. G. Clay | 6.9% |
| Ekibin | O. L. Olsen | 7.3% |
| Kalinga | D. A. Turnbull | 7.7% |
Safe
| McDowall | John Goss | 11.1% |
| The Gap | Brian Hallinan | 11.5% |
| Rochedale | Graham Quirk | 12.3% |
Very safe
| Jamboree | Phil Denman | 18.7% |
| Taringa | Denver Beanland | 23.0% |
| Pullenvale | Bob Mills | 27.2% |
Labor wards (11)
Marginal
| Coopers Plains | J. R. Wheeler | 2.4% |
| Carina | B. V. Walsh | 3.4% |
| The Gabba | K. O. T. Quinn | 4.5% |
| Spring Hill | Ian Brusasco | 4.9% |
Fairly safe
| Enoggera | Brian Mellifont | 5.7% |
| Deagon | Ken Leese | 8.2% |
| Paddington | Joe St Ledger | 6.0% |
Safe
| Eagle Farm | Patricia Vaughan | 10.8% |
| Inala | Clive Wells | 10.8% |
| Doboy | John Campbell | 11.2% |
| Kianawah | Don Randall | 12.1% |

=== Post-Election Pendulum ===
Liberal wards (17)
Marginal
| Carina | G. R. McDougall | 1.4% |
| Coopers Plains | G. J. Stegman | 1.6% |
Fairly safe
| Kalinga | Carol Cashman | 9.2% |
Safe
| Chermside | L. B. Barnes | 10.3% |
| Camp Hill | S. R. Jeffreys | 10.4% |
| Holland Park | Gail Chiconi | 12.6% |
| Fairfield | B. K. Murray | 13.0% |
| Bracken Ridge | Keith Murray | 13.1% |
| Ekibin | O. L. Olsen | 13.3% |
Very safe
| The Gap | Brian Hallinan | 16.3% |
| Breakfast Creek | S. S. Clay | 17.3% |
| McDowall | John Goss | 20.4% |
| Rochedale | Graham Quirk | 20.4% |
| Runcorn | Bob Ward | 21.3% |
| Jamboree | Phil Denman | 22.8% |
| Taringa | June O'Connell | 25.3% |
| Pullenvale | Bob Mills | 29.3% |
Labor wards (9)
Marginal
| Spring Hill | Ian Brusasco | 1.3% |
| Enoggera | Brian Mellifont | 3.4% |
| Deagon | Ken Leese | 3.8% |
| Inala | Clive Wells | 4.7% |
Fairly safe
| Doboy | John Campbell | 5.9% |
| Kianawah | Don Randall | 6.2% |
| Paddington | Joe St Ledger | 6.7% |
| The Gabba | K. O. T. Quinn | 7.7% |
Safe
| Eagle Farm | Patricia Vaughan | 10.3% |

== Results ==
=== Ward summary ===
| Ward | Party | Alderman | Margin (%) |
|---|---|---|---|
| Bracken Ridge | Liberal | Keith Murray | 13.1 |
| Breakfast Creek | Liberal | S. S. Clay | 17.3 |
| Camp Hill | Liberal | S. R. Jeffreys | 10.4 |
| Carina | Liberal | G. R. McDougall | 1.4 |
| Chermside | Liberal | L. B. Barnes | 10.3 |
| Coopers Plains | Liberal | G. J. Stegman | 1.6 |
| Deagon | Labor | Ken Leese | 3.8 |
| Doboy | Labor | John Campbell | 5.9 |
| Eagle Farm | Labor | Patricia Vaughan | 10.3 |
| Ekibin | Liberal | O. L. Olsen | 13.3 |
| Enoggera | Labor | Brian Mellifont | 3.4 |
| Fairfield | Liberal | B. K. Murray | 13.0 |
| Holland Park | Liberal | Gail Chiconi | 12.6 |
| Inala | Labor | Clive Wells | 4.7 |
| Jamboree | Liberal | Phil Denman | 22.8 |
| Kalinga | Liberal | Carol Cashman | 9.2 |
| Kianawah | Labor | Don Randall | 6.2 |
| McDowall | Liberal | John Goss | 20.4 |
| Paddington | Labor | Joe St Ledger | 6.7 |
| Pullenvale | Liberal | Bob Mills | 29.3 |
| Rochedale | Liberal | Graham Quirk | 20.4 |
| Runcorn | Liberal | Bob Ward | 21.4 |
| Spring Hill | Labor | Ian Brusasco | 1.3 |
| Taringa | Liberal | June O'Connell | 25.3 |
| The Gabba | Labor | K. O. T. Quinn | 7.7 |
| The Gap | Liberal | Brian Hallinan | 16.3 |
