= 1985 Brisbane City Council election =

Australian local election

- 30 March 1985
- Registered: 475,299
- Turnout: 415,883 (87.5%)
- Lord Mayor
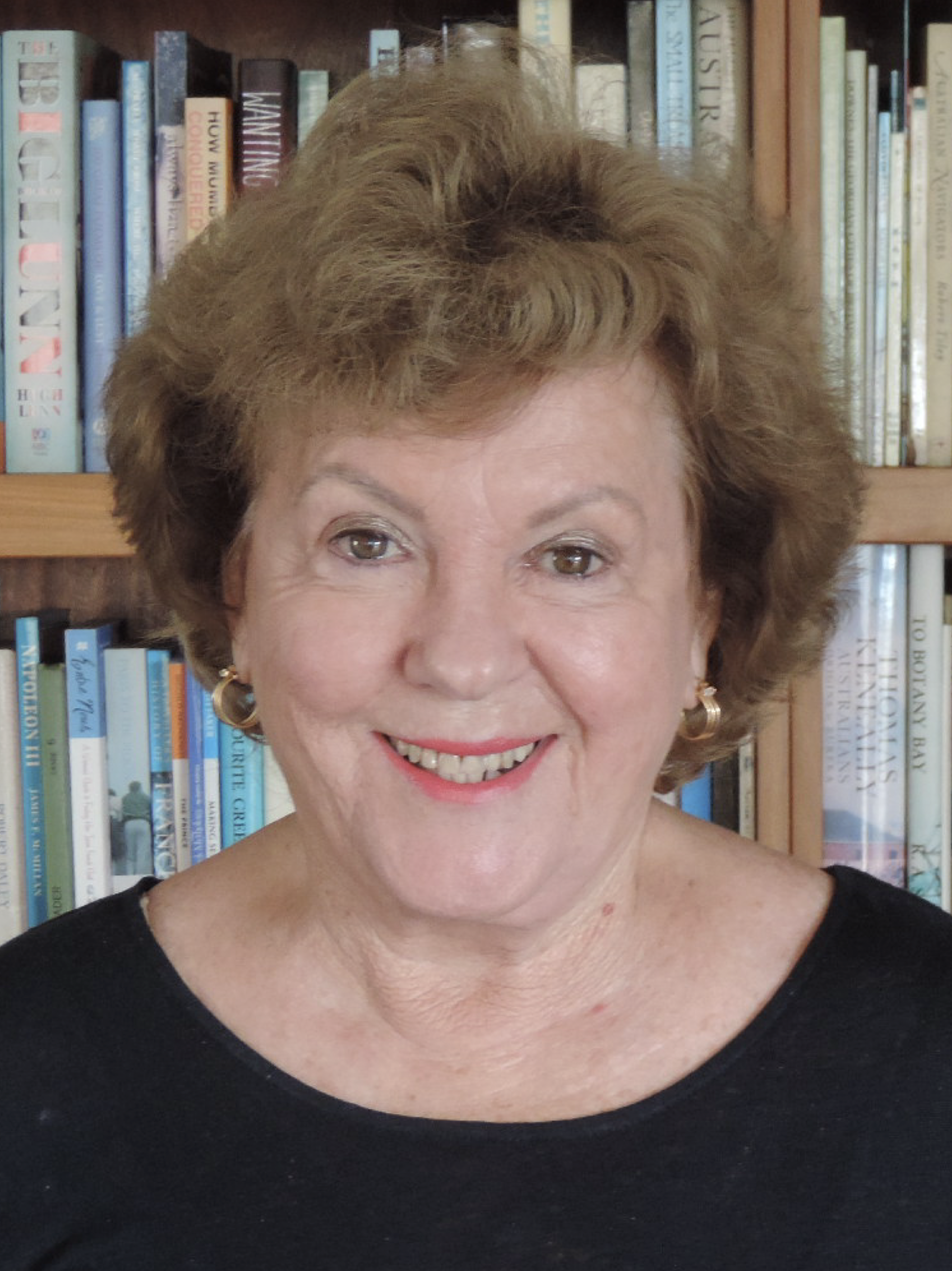

	First party	Second party
Candidate	Sallyanne Atkinson	Roy Harvey
Party	Liberal	Labor
Popular vote	209,651	179,968
Percentage	51.76%	44.43%
Lord Mayor before election
Roy Harvey
Labor
Subsequent Lord Mayor
Sallyanne Atkinson
Liberal
- All 26 wards on the City Council; 13 wards needed for a majority
Party	Leader	Vote %	Seats	+/–
Liberal	Sallyanne Atkinson		15	
Labor	Roy Harvey		11	
This lists parties that won seats. See the complete results below.

The 1985 Brisbane City Council election was held on 30 March 1985 to elect a lord mayor and 26 aldermen to the City of Brisbane. The election was held as part of the statewide local government elections in Queensland, Australia.

The election saw the lord mayoralty re-established as a directly elected position, having been chosen by a vote of the aldermen since 1973, and increased the number of aldermen increased from 21 to 26. This reversed changes made by the former Country Party state government that had targeted the council's Labor administration. The election also saw a significant redistribution of wards to accommodate the additional aldermen, with most of the city's wards being abolished.

The incumbent Labor Party had controlled both the mayoralty and a majority of wards since the 1961 election. The party was led by Lord Mayor Roy Harvey, who sought a ninth consecutive term for the party and a second term as Lord Mayor.

The election resulted in the election of the Liberal Party under Sallyanne Atkinson. The party gaining a majority of wards and more than 50% of the mayoral vote. This was in part helped by the National Party, who had contested the 1982 election, choosing to not contest this election to avoid splitting the conservative vote from the Liberal party.

In the mayoral election, Liberal candidate Sallyanne Atkinson defeated Roy Harvey. As of 2024, Atkinson is the first and only female Lord Mayor of Brisbane.

This was the first and only election contested by the Brisbane Green Party, the predecessor to the Queensland Greens. The party contested the lord mayorship and four wards, but did not have any victories.

Future lord mayor Graham Quirk was elected in Rochedale Ward at this election.

== Results ==
=== Ward summary ===
Ward	Party	Alderman	Margin (%)
Bracken Ridge	Liberal	Keith Murray	1.5
Breakfast Creek	Liberal	G. G. Clay	6.9
Camp Hill	Liberal	S. R. Jeffreys	2.7
Carina	Labor	B. V. Walsh	3.4
Chermside	Liberal	L. B. Barnes	1.3
Coopers Plains	Labor	J. R. Wheeler	2.4
Deagon	Labor	Ken Leese	8.2
Doboy	Labor	John Campbell	11.2
Eagle Farm	Labor	Patricia Vaughan	10.8
Ekibin	Liberal	O. L. Olsen	7.3
Enoggera	Labor	Brian Mellifont	5.7
Fairfield	Liberal	Norman Rose	5.2
Holland Park	Liberal	Gail Chiconi	2.4
Inala	Labor	Clive Wells	10.8
Jamboree	Liberal	Phil Denman	18.7
Kalinga	Liberal	D. A. Turnbull	7.7
Kianawah	Labor	Don Randall	12.1
McDowall	Liberal	John Goss	11.1
Paddington	Labor	Joe St Ledger	6.0
Pullenvale	Liberal	Bob Mills	27.2
Rochedale	Liberal	Graham Quirk	12.3
Runcorn	Liberal	Bob Ward	5.1
Spring Hill	Labor	Ian Brusasco	4.9
Taringa	Liberal	Denver Beanland	23.0
The Gabba	Labor	Tim Quinn	4.5
The Gap	Liberal	Brian Hallinan	11.5
