= Paddington Ward =

Brisbane City Council ward

- Paddington Ward, 2024
- Dates current: 1925–1937; 1985–1994; 2016–present
- Councillor: Seal Chong Wah
- Party: Greens
- Namesake: Paddington
- Electors: 33,366 (2024)
- Area: 16.7 km^{2} (6.4 sq mi)
- Coordinates: 27.4599°S 152.9959°E
Electorates around Paddington Ward:
The Gap	The Gap	Enoggera; Hamilton
Pullenvale	Paddington Ward	Central
Pullenvale	Walter Taylor	The Gabba (across river)

Paddington Ward is a Brisbane City Council ward covering Paddington, Auchenflower, Kelvin Grove, Milton, Petrie Terrace, Red Hill, and parts of Bardon and Toowong.

The current Paddington Ward was established for the 2016 election, and is the third Brisbane ward to bear the name. The ward previously existed from 1925 to 1937 (as one of the city's original 20 wards), and again from 1985 to 1994.

== History ==
=== First incarnation ===
The first Paddington Ward was established with the creation of the City of Brisbane, and was one of the original 20 wards contested at the 1925 Brisbane City Council election. The ward was created using the boundaries of the Electoral district of Paddington, as the city originally defined its wards on the state electoral districts that were fully or partially within its boundaries.

John Fihelly of the Labor Party was elected at the 1925 election as the ward's first alderman., and was re-elected at the 1928 election. Bill Power succeeded Fihelly for the Labor Party at the 1931 election.

Though a reduction in state districts ahead of the 1932 Queensland state election saw the Electoral district of Paddington abolished, Paddington Ward was retained for the 1934 Brisbane election as the city still required 20 wards. However, as the city needed 20 wards, Paddington Ward was retained for the 1934 council election. Power was re-elected for the ward at the 1934 election.

As part of the redistribution prior to the 1935 Queensland state election, a new Electoral district of Baroona was established in a similar region to the abolished district of Paddington. Incumbent alderman Bill Power contested the new district at the 1935 election, and vacated the ward upon his election to the Legislative Assembly. Walter Russell Crampton was appointed to the casual vacancy.

Following the state redistribution, the City of Brisbane returned to defining its wards on state district boundaries; abolishing Paddington Ward and establishing Baroona Ward for the 1937 Brisbane election. Crampton successfully contested the new ward, and served as its alderman until his death in 1938.

=== Second incarnation ===
The second Paddington Ward was established for the 1985 election as part of an increase from 21 to 26 wards. It was created from the northern half of the abolished Auchenflower Ward and the western edge of the abolished Central City Ward. The ward covered the present suburbs of Milton, Paddington, Petrie Terrace, and Red Hill; almost all of Auchenflower and Bardon; and parts of Ashgrove, Brisbane City, Kelvin Grove, Newmarket, and Toowong.

The ward was won by the Labor Party at the 1985 election, and retained at the 1988 election. Helen Abrahams was elected at the 1991 election, retaining the ward again for the Labor Party.

The ward was abolished for the 1994 election, with its area split between the new Central Ward and the second incarnation of Toowong Ward.

=== Third incarnation ===
The second Toowong Ward was abolished ahead of the 2016 election after successive redistributions had seen it lose most of Toowong to Walter Taylor Ward. The third incarnation of Paddington Ward was established slightly further north, taking in much of the abolished ward's area. Incumbent Toowong Ward councillor, Peter Matic, successfully contested the new ward for the Liberal National Party at the 2016 election. Matic narrowly retained the ward at the 2020 election.

In March 2023, Matic announced he would not re-contest the ward at the 2024 election and that he would step down prior to the election, allowing for a successor to be appointed to the vacancy. Clare Jenkinson was confirmed as his successor in June 2023, and was officially oppointed on 22 June 2023.

At the 2024 election, Seal Chong Wah won the ward for the Queensland Greens, narrowly defeating Jenkinson as the incumbent. Chong Wah's election gave the Queensland Greens a second councillor in the City of Brisbane; having also held The Gabba Ward since 2016.

== Councillors for Paddington Ward ==
=== First incarnation ===
Image	Councillor	Party	Term	Notes
	John Fihelly	Labor	21 February 1925 – 2 May 1931	
	Bill Power	Labor	2 May 1931 – 11 May 1935	Resigned upon election for the Electoral district of Baroona.
	Walter Russell Crampton	Labor	After 11 May 1935 – 1937	Appointed to fill casual vacancy. Ward abolished, successfully contested new Baroona Ward at 1937 election.

=== Second incarnation ===
Image	Councillor	Party	Term	Notes
	Joe St Ledger	Labor	30 March 1985 – 28 March 1991	
	Helen Abrahams	Labor	28 March 1991 – 26 March 1994	Ward abolished.

=== Third incarnation ===
Image	Councillor	Party	Term	Notes
	Peter Matic	Liberal National	19 March 2016 – 22 June 2023	Transferred from Toowong Ward. Resigned
	Clare Jenkinson	Liberal National	22 June 2023 – 16 March 2024	Appointed to fill casual vacancy. Lost seat
	Seal Chong Wah	Greens	16 March 2024 – present	Incumbent

== Election results ==
=== 2024 ===
2024 Queensland local elections: Paddington Ward
Party	Candidate	Votes	%	±%
Liberal National	Clare Jenkinson	12,090	43.86	−1.64
Greens	Seal Chong Wah	10,863	39.41	+1.11
Labor	Sún Etheridge	4,613	16.73	+0.53
Total formal votes		27,566	98.57	
Informal votes		400	1.43	
Turnout		27,966	83.82	
Two-candidate-preferred result
Greens	Seal Chong Wah	13,241	50.76	+1.46
Liberal National	Clare Jenkinson	12,845	49.24	−1.46
Greens gain from Liberal National		Swing	+1.46	

=== 2020 ===
2020 Queensland local elections: Paddington Ward
Party	Candidate	Votes	%	±%
Liberal National	Peter Matic	10,629	45.4	−3.2
Greens	Donna Burns	8,984	38.4	+11.5
Labor	Jeff Eelkema	3,775	16.1	−8.3
Total formal votes		23,388	98.5	+0.4
Informal votes		347	1.5	−0.4
Turnout		23,735	75.4	−3.2
Notional two-party-preferred count
Liberal National	Peter Matic	11,489	58.4	+1.1
Labor	Jeff Eelkema	8,196	41.6	−1.1
Two-party-preferred result
Liberal National	Peter Matic	11,064	50.7	−5.1
Greens	Donna Burns	10,753	49.3	+5.1
Liberal National hold		Swing	−5.1	

=== 2016 ===
2016 Queensland local elections: Paddington Ward
Party	Candidate	Votes	%	±%
Liberal National	Peter Matic	11,326	48.9	−4.7
Greens	Michael Kane	6,328	27.3	+6.0
Labor	Jeff Eelkema	5,510	23.8	−1.3
Total formal votes		23,164	98.1	−0.2
Informal votes		437	1.9	+0.2
Turnout		23,601	78.6	+1.3
Notional two-party-preferred count
Liberal National	Peter Matic		57.3	
Labor	Jeff Eelkema		42.7	
Two-party-preferred result
Liberal National	Peter Matic	11,736	55.8	−6.1
Greens	Michael Kane	9,283	44.2	+6.1
Liberal National hold		Swing	−6.1	

=== 1931 ===
1931 Brisbane City Council election: Paddington Ward
Party	Candidate	Votes	%	±%
Labor	Bill Power	1,999	56.56	
Civic Reform	Benjamin Harding	1,056	29.88	
Non-party Progressive	James Leavy	241	6.82	
Independent Citizens'	Elizabeth Goldsmith	238	6.73	
Total formal votes		3,534	91.34	
Informal votes		335	8.66	
Turnout		3,869	91.31	
Labor hold		Swing		

=== 1928 ===
1928 Brisbane City Council election: Paddington Ward
Party	Candidate	Votes	%	±%
Labor	John Arthur Fihelly	2,321	59.12	−1.82%
Nationalist Civic	Windham Harold Wilson	1,605	40.88	+1.82%
Total formal votes		3,926		
Informal votes				
Turnout				
Labor hold		Swing	−1.82%	

=== 1925 ===
1925 Brisbane City Council election: Paddington Ward
Party	Candidate	Votes	%	±%
Labor	John Arthur Fihelly	2,917	60.94	
United	William John Smout	1,870	39.06	
Total formal votes		4,787	95.38	
Informal votes		232	4.62	
Turnout		5,019	80.34	
Labor win		(new seat)		
