= Bracken Ridge Ward =

Brisbane City Council ward

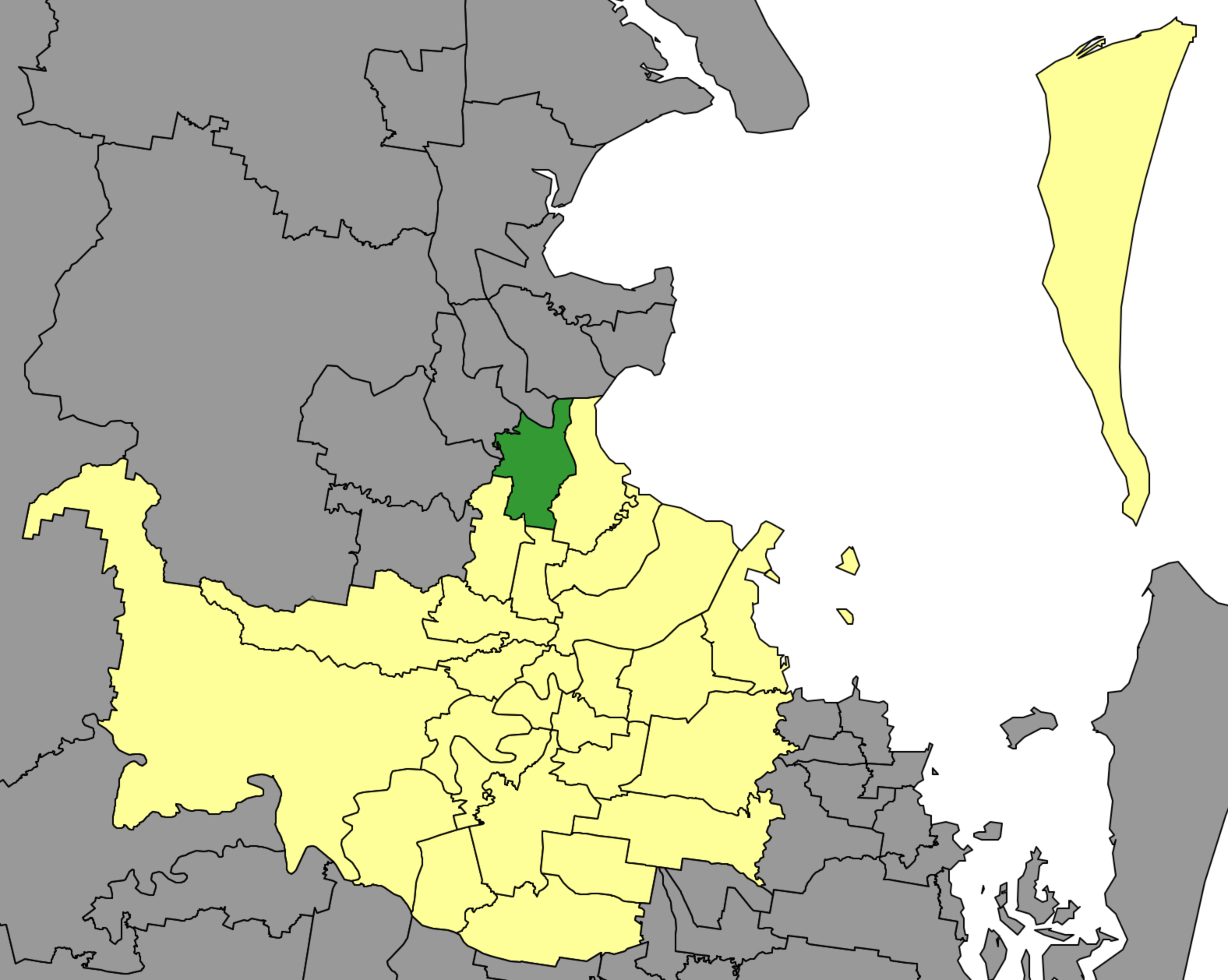
- Created: 1985
- MP: Sandy Landers
- Party: Liberal National
- Namesake: Bracken Ridge
- Electors: 31,445 (2024)
- Demographic: Outer metropolitan

The Bracken Ridge Ward is a Brisbane City Council ward covering Bracken Ridge, Bald Hills, Carseldine, Fitzgibbon, and parts of Aspley and Zillmere. It was established for the 1985 Brisbane City Council election, and is one of only eight wards to have been contested at every election since 1985. (Note: Alongside Deagon, Doboy, Enoggera, Holland Park, Jamboree, McDowall, and The Gap wards.)

The ward has been represented by the Liberal Party, and subsequently the Liberal National Party, since its creation. It has been represented by Sandy Landers of the Liberal National Party since October 2019.

== History ==
The Bracken Ridge Ward was established for the 1985 Brisbane City Council election, as part of increasing the number of wards in the City of Brisbane was increased from 21 to 26. The ward was created from the western half of the abolished Bramble Bay Ward – covering the suburbs of Bracken Ridge, Bald Hills, and Fitzgibbon – and a small part of the retained (but significantly altered) Chermside Ward – covering parts of the suburbs of Aspley, Carseldine, Zillmere. It has since largely maintained these boundaries; losing a small section of Zillmere and gaining the rest of Carseldine.

At the 1985 election, Keith Murray was elected for the Liberal Party, contributing to the party's defeat of the incumbent Labor Party after twenty-four years in office. Murray was re-elected at the 1988, 1991, and 1994 elections.

Carol Cashman succeeded Murray for the Liberal Party at the 1997 election, and was re-elected in 2000 and 2004. Cashman resigned in 2007, and Amanda Cooper was appointed to the casual vacancy. Cooper retained the ward for the Liberal Party at the 2008 election, which merged with the Nationals to form the Liberal National Party in July of that year. She was re-elected at the 2012 and 2016 elections, and represented the ward until October 2019, when she resigned to (unsuccessfully) contest the District of Aspley in the 2020 Queensland state election for the Liberal National Party.

Sandy Landers was appointed in October 2019 to fill the casual vacancy caused by Cooper's resignation. She retained the ward at the 2020 election, and was re-elected at the 2024 election.

== Councillors for Bracken Ridge Ward ==
Image	Member	Party	Term	Notes
	Keith Murray	Liberal	30 March 1985 – 15 March 1997	Ward established for 1985 election.
	Carol Cashman	Liberal	15 March 1997 – June 2007	Resigned.
	Amanda Cooper	Liberal	June 2007 – 26 July 2008	Appointed to fill vacancy. Resigned to (unsuccessfully) contest the District of Aspley at the 2020 Queensland state election.
	Amanda Cooper	Liberal National	26 July 2008 – 14 October 2019	Appointed to fill vacancy. Resigned to (unsuccessfully) contest the District of Aspley at the 2020 Queensland state election.
	Sandy Landers	Liberal National	22 October 2019 – present	Appointed to fill vacancy.

== Results ==
=== 2024 ===
2024 Queensland local elections: Bracken Ridge Ward
Party	Candidate	Votes	%	±%
Liberal National	Sandy Landers	14,997	56.91	+6.87
Labor	Thomas Stephen	7,836	29.74	−7.80
Greens	John Harbison	3,519	13.35	+0.93
Total formal votes		26,352	97.63	+0.54
Informal votes		640	2.37	−0.54
Turnout		26,992	85.84	+4.58
Two-party-preferred result
Liberal National	Sandy Landers	15,418	61.37	+7.22
Labor	Thomas Stephen	9,704	38.63	−7.22
Liberal National hold		Swing	+7.22	

=== 2020 ===
2020 Queensland local elections: Bracken Ridge Ward
Party	Candidate	Votes	%	±%
Liberal National	Sandy Landers	11,798	50.0	−6.6
Labor	Cath Palmer	8,850	37.5	+2.9
Greens	Kathryn Fry	2,929	12.4	+3.6
Total formal votes		23,577		
Informal votes		707		
Turnout		24,284		
Two-party-preferred result
Liberal National	Sandy Landers	12,127	54.2	−6.4
Labor	Cath Palmer	10,267	45.8	+6.4
Liberal National hold		Swing	−6.4	

=== 2016 ===
2016 Queensland local elections: Bracken Ridge Ward
Party	Candidate	Votes	%	±%
Liberal National	Amanda Cooper	13,669	56.6	−10.4
Labor	Cath Palmer	8,352	34.6	+9.3
Greens	Keith Skelton	2,120	8.8	+1.1
Total formal votes		24,141	-	−
Informal votes		688	-	−
Turnout		24,829	-	−
Two-party-preferred result
Liberal National	Amanda Cooper	13,989	60.6	−11.1
Labor	Cath Palmer	9,101	39.4	+11.1
Liberal National hold		Swing	−11.1	

=== 2012 ===
2012 Brisbane City Council election: Bracken Ridge Ward
Party	Candidate	Votes	%	±%
Liberal National	Amanda Cooper	14,786	67.0	+7.9
Labor	Carla Pinder	5,583	25.3	−7.3
Greens	Keith Skelton	1,695	7.7	+2.3
Total formal votes		22,064	-	−
Informal votes		551	2.4	+0.5
Turnout		22,615	-	−
Two-party-preferred result
Liberal National	Amanda Cooper	15,027	71.6	+7.7
Labor	Carla Pinder	5,962	28.4	−7.7
Liberal National hold		Swing	+7.7	

=== 2008 ===
2008 Queensland local elections: Bracken Ridge Ward
Party	Candidate	Votes	%	±%
Liberal	Amanda Cooper	13,322	59.16	−6.26
Labor	Sean Waugh	7,332	32.56	+3.99
Greens	Janine Murphy	1,214	5.39	+0.62
Informal votes		440	1.92	−0.12
Two-party-preferred result
Liberal	Amanda Cooper	13,501	63.88	−5.31
Labor	Sean Waugh	7,634	36.12	+5.31
Liberal hold		Swing	−5.31	

=== 2004 ===
2004 Brisbane City Council election: Bracken Ridge Ward
Party	Candidate	Votes	%	±%
Liberal	Carol Cashman	14,103	65.45	
Labor	Steve Davey	6,137	28.48	
Greens	Mark Carey-Smith	1,308	6.07	
Total formal votes		21,548	98.07	
Informal votes		423	1.93	
Turnout		21,971	89.25	
Two-party-preferred result
Liberal	Carol Cashman	14,274	69.19	
Labor	Steve Davey	6,356	30.81	
Liberal hold		Swing		
