= Toowong Ward =

Former Brisbane City Council ward

Toowong Ward Queensland — Brisbane City Council
- Dates current: 1925–1973; 1994–2016
- Namesake: Toowong

Toowong Ward was a Brisbane City Council ward from 1925 to 1973, and again from 1994 to 2016. Both incarnations were based in Brisbane's inner west, covering Toowong and surrounding suburbs.

Across both its incarnations, the ward was almost exclusively represented by members of the Liberal Party/Liberal National Party or their precursors.

== History ==
=== First incarnation ===
The first incarnation of Toowong Ward was established with the creation of the City of Brisbane, and was one of the original 20 wards contested at the 1925 Brisbane City Council election. The ward was created using the boundaries of the Electoral district of Toowong, as the city originally defined its wards on the state electoral districts that were fully or partially within its boundaries. The ward also largely succeeded the Town of Toowong, which was one of 20 LGAs abolished to form the new city.

The ward was one of only nine original wards to be contested at every election from 1925 to 1970; expansions of the Queensland Legislative Assembly in 1950 and 1960 having indirectly abolished a number of wards, and increased the total wards to 28. However, ahead of the 1973 council election, the Country Party state government altered the City's electoral acts in a bid to remove incumbent Labor Lord Mayor Clem Jones. This included a reduction from 28 to 21 wards, which meant the city could no longer define its ward boundaries using state districts. As such, all 28 wards were abolished and replaced by wards with different names to the state districts. The abolished Toowong Ward was split between the new wards of Auchenflower and Indooroopilly.

=== Second incarnation ===
The second incarnation of the ward was established for the 1994 election, and was created from parts of the abolished Taringa Ward and the second incarnation of Paddington Ward.

The ward's was represented by Judy Magub from the 1994 election until her resignation in 2007. Peter Matic was appointed to fill the resulting vacancy and represented the ward until its abolition.

Successive redistributions saw the ward lose the majority of the suburb of Toowong to Walter Taylor Ward, leading to it being abolished ahead of the 2016 election. Its area largely became part of the third incarnation of Paddington Ward, with incumbent councillor Matic successfully contesting the new ward.

== Councillors for Toowong Ward ==
=== First incarnation ===
Image	Member	Party	Term	Notes
	Archibald Watson	United	21 February 1925 – 12 May 1925	Served as the final mayor of the Town of Toowong. Vacated position upon becoming Lord Mayor.
	Archibald Watson	Nationalist Civic	12 May 1925 – 24 February 1931	Served as the final mayor of the Town of Toowong. Vacated position upon becoming Lord Mayor.
	Harry Massey	Civic Reform	2 May 1931 – 28 April 1934	Did not contest 1937 election.
	Harry Massey	Independent	28 April 1934 – 1937	Did not contest 1937 election.
	William Richer Moon	Citizens' Municipal Organisation	1937 – 30 April 1955	Did not contest 1955 election.
	Lex Ord	Citizens' Municipal Organisation	30 April 1955 – 31 March 1973	Ward abolished. Successfully contested new Indooroopilly Ward at 1973 election.

=== Second incarnation ===
Image	Member	Party	Term	Notes
	Judy Magub	Liberal	26 March 1994 – 2007	Resigned.
	Peter Matic	Liberal	2007 – 26 July 2008	Appointed to fill vacancy. Ward abolished. Successfully contested new Paddington Ward at 2016 election.
	Peter Matic	Liberal National	26 July 2008 – 19 March 2016	Appointed to fill vacancy. Ward abolished. Successfully contested new Paddington Ward at 2016 election.

== Election results ==
2012 Brisbane City Council election: Toowong Ward
Party	Candidate	Votes	%	±%
Liberal National	Peter Matic	9,821	54.22	+2.14
Labor	Yvonne Li	4,582	25.30	−1.10
Greens	Robert Hogg	3,711	20.49	−1.03
Total formal votes		18,114	98.39	−0.32
Informal votes		296	1.61	+0.32
Turnout		18,410	75.32	−4.47
Two-party-preferred result
Liberal National	Peter Matic	10,187	62.35	+0.59
Labor	Yvonne Li	6,152	37.65	−0.59
Liberal National hold		Swing	+0.59	

2008 Brisbane City Council election: Toowong Ward
Party	Candidate	Votes	%	±%
Liberal National	Peter Matic	10,197	52.08	−1.94
Labor	Yvonne Li	4,582	26.40	−0.52
Greens	Stuart Skabo	4,213	21.52	+2.45
Total formal votes		19,835	98.71	+0.24
Informal votes		256	1.29	−0.24
Turnout		19,579	79.79	
Two-party-preferred result
Liberal National	Peter Matic	10,502	61.76	−0.95
Labor	Yvonne Li	6,502	38.24	+0.95
Liberal National hold		Swing	−0.95	

2004 Brisbane City Council election: Toowong Ward
Party	Candidate	Votes	%	±%
Liberal National	Judy Magub	9,913	54.02	+0.69
Labor	Martin Bradshaw	4,940	26.92	−19.75
Greens	Stuart Skabo	3,499	19.07	+19.07
Total formal votes		18,352	98.47	
Informal votes		286	1.53	
Turnout		18,638		
Two-party-preferred result
Liberal National	Judy Magub	10,391	62.71	+9.28
Labor	Martin Bradshaw	6,180	37.29	−9.28
Liberal National hold		Swing		

2000 Brisbane City Council election: Toowong Ward
Party	Candidate	Votes	%	±%
Liberal National	Judy Magub	9,350	53.33	
Labor	Christine Axelby	8,182	46.67	
Total formal votes		17,532	98.47	98.05
Informal votes		349	1.95	
Turnout		17,881		
Liberal National hold		Swing		
