= Brisbane Civic Party =

- Leader: John Andrews
- Founded: 1973
- Dissolved: 1976
- Preceded by: Citizens' Municipal Organisation
- Succeeded by: Liberal Party
- Brisbane City Council: 1 / 21 (1973−1976)

The Brisbane Civic Party (BCP) was an Australian political party that briefly competed in Brisbane City Council elections.

== History ==
After another defeat in 1970, the Citizens' Municipal Organisation (CMO) was described as "moribund" and did not contest the election. Instead, the Brisbane Civic Party was formed and led by Mitchelton Ward councillor John Andrews.

Despite changes introduced by the Bjelke-Petersen state government before the 1973 election, which reduced the number of wards and removed the direct lord mayoral election, the BCP lost in a landslide. The Labor Party won 20 out of 21 seats, while the BCP won just one ward − Indooroopilly − while Andrews lost his seat in Mitchelton.

Following the BCP's loss, the Liberal Party decided to endorse candidates, starting at the 1976 election. The CMO also disbanded around this time.

== See also ==
- Citizens' Municipal Organisation
- Liberal Civic Party
