= Mitchelton Ward =

Australian local government ward

Mitchelton Ward Queensland — Brisbane City Council
- Created: 1973
- Abolished: 1985
- Namesake: Mitchelton

Mitchelton Ward was a Brisbane City Council ward from 1973 to 1985. It covered the suburbs of Everton Park, Ferny Grove, Keperra, and Mitchelton; the majority of Gaythorne; and parts of Enoggera, McDowall Stafford, and Stafford Heights. The ward was abolished for the 1985 Brisbane City Council election, and its area was split between the new Enoggera and McDowall wards.

== Councillors for Mitchelton Ward ==
| Image | Member | Party | Term | Notes |
|---|---|---|---|---|
| | | Labor | 31 March 1973 – 31 March 1979 | |
| | Roy Harvey (1921–2006) | Labor | 31 March 1979 – 30 March 1985 | Served as Lord Mayor from 1982 until 1985, having been elected by the council's aldermen. |
