= Amanda Cooper =

Amanda Cooper may refer to:

- Amanda Brundage (born 1991), née Amanda Cooper, American mixed martial artist
- Amanda Cooper (Young Sheldon)
- Amanda Jane Cooper (born 1998), American actress
- Amanda Cooper (politician), Australian politician
