= Waterloo Bay Ward =

Australian local government ward

Waterloo Bay Ward Queensland — Brisbane City Council
- Created: 1973
- Abolished: 1985
- Namesake: Waterloo Bay

Waterloo Bay Ward was a Brisbane City Council ward from 1973 to 1985 in Queensland, Australia. It covered the present-day suburbs of Hemmant, Lota, Lytton, Port of Brisbane, Manly, and Wynnum, and Wynnum West; and parts of Manly West, Murarrie, and Tingalpa.

The ward was established for the 1973 Brisbane City Council election as part of a reduction from 28 to 21 wards, and was created from the abolished Wynnum Ward and eastern part of the abolished Bulimba Ward.

The ward was abolished for the 1985 Brisbane City Council election as part of increasing to 26 wards. The majority of its eastern portion became part of the new Kianawah Ward, aside from a small part of Manly West transferred to the retained Carina Ward. The ward's western area formed part of the new Doboy Ward, with this area still retained in the ward's current boundaries.

The ward was represented by the Labor Party for the twelve years it existed. Eric Shaw represented the ward from 1973 to 1979, having represented the preceding Wynnum Ward since 1967. Shaw was succeeded by Don Randall at the 1979 election, with Randall retaining the ward until its abolishment in 1985.

== Councillors for Waterloo Bay Ward ==
Image	Member	Party	Term	Notes
	Eric Shaw	Labor	31 March 1973 – 31 March 1979	Represented Wynnum Ward from 1967 until its abolishment.
	Don Randall	Labor	31 March 1979 – 30 March 1985	Ward abolished. Successfully contested new Kianawah Ward.
