= 1925 Brisbane City Council election =

Australian local council election

- 21 February 1925
- Registered: 146,557
- Turnout: 83.42%
- Lord Mayor
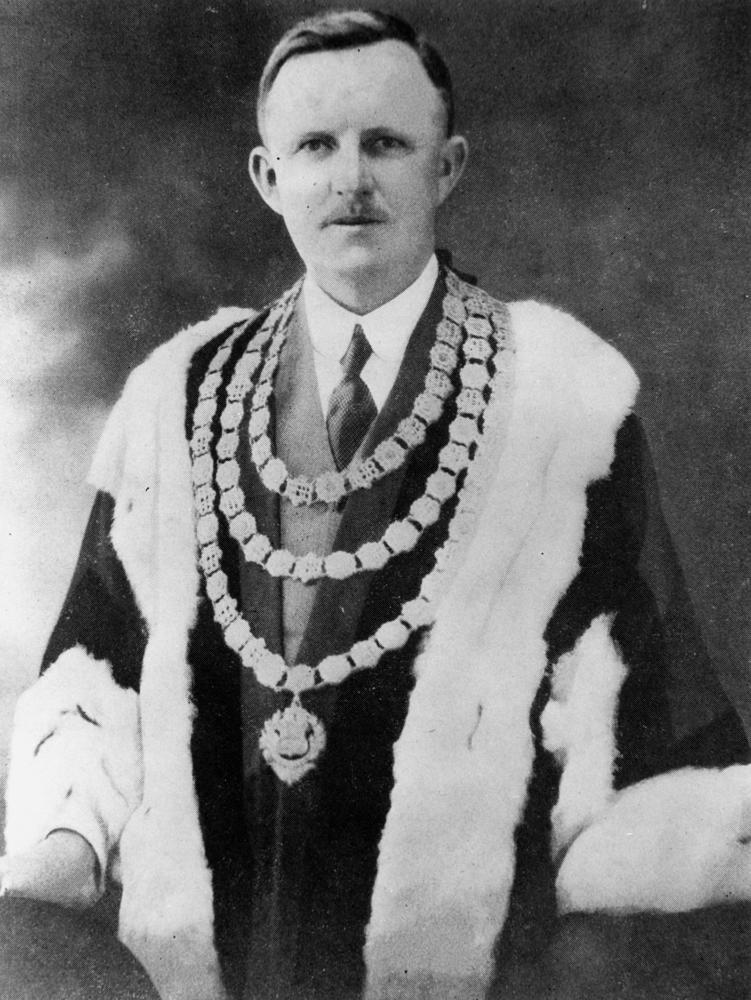
	First party	Second party
Candidate	William Jolly	John Keogh
Party	United	Labor
Popular vote	68,644	48,325
Percentage	58.69%	41.31%
Lord Mayor before election
Position established
Elected Lord Mayor
William Jolly
United
- Aldermen
- All 20 wards on the City Council; 10 wards needed for a majority
Party	Leader	Vote %	Seats	+/–
United	William Jolly	52.57	14	
Labor		42.19	6	
Independent	N/A	5.24	0	
This lists parties that won seats. See the complete results below.

The 1925 Brisbane City Council election was held on 21 February to elect the Lord Mayor and councillors for each of the 20 wards of the City of Brisbane. The election was the first for the City of Brisbane, which had been created from the amalgamation of 20 local governments the previous year.

Map of the City of Brisbane, with former local authority boundaries and boundaries of the new electoral wards

The new council was composed of 21 Aldermen, 20 elected from single member wards that aligned with state electoral district boundaries within the city, and the Lord Mayor who was elected by the city as one electorate. All persons who were on the state electoral roll at an address within the city boundaries were electors for the City Council.

== Results ==
The election was conducted under the Queensland Elections Act (1915) so voting was compulsory and the Contingent vote was used.

These results are final, after the distribution of any contingent votes (preferences).

=== Lord Mayor ===
1925 Brisbane mayoral election
Party	Candidate	Votes	%	±%
United	William Jolly	68,644	58.69	
Labor	John Keogh	48,325	41.31	
Total formal votes		116,969	95.99	
Informal votes		4,882	4.01	
Turnout		121,851		
United win		(new seat)		

=== Wards ===
==== Summary ====
Queensland local government election, 21 February 1925 Brisbane City Council –1928 >>
Enrolled voters	146,557				
Votes cast	122,259		Turnout	83.42	
Informal votes	4,751		Informal	3.89	
Summary of votes by party
Party	Primary votes	%	Swing	Seats	Change
United	67,776	52.57	-	14	-
Labor	49,571	42.19	-	6	-
Independent	6,161	5.24	-	0	-
Total	122,259			20	

==== Brisbane ====
1925 Brisbane City Council election: Brisbane Ward
Party	Candidate	Votes	%	±%
Labor	Joseph Patrick Teefey	2,126	54.89	
United	William John Foster	1,565	40.41	
Total formal votes		3,691	95.30	
Informal votes		182	4.70	
Turnout		3,873	67.71	
Labor win		(new seat)		

==== Bulimba ====
1925 Brisbane City Council election: Bulimba Ward
Party	Candidate	Votes	%	±%
United	Alfred Harrison	3,759	52.32	
Labor	Sydney Nickson	3,427	47.69	
Total formal votes		7,186	96.78	
Informal votes		239	3.22	
Turnout		7,425	87.82	
United win		(new seat)		

==== Buranda ====
1925 Brisbane City Council election: Buranda Ward
Party	Candidate	Votes	%	±%
Labor	Arthur Laurie	3,201	54.88	
United	George William Bennett	2,632	45.12	
Total formal votes		5,833	94.86	
Informal votes		316	5.14	
Turnout		6,149	89.49	
Labor win		(new seat)		

==== Enoggera ====
1925 Brisbane City Council election: Enoggera Ward
Party	Candidate	Votes	%	±%
United	Ernest Lanham	3,798	53.37	
Labor	George Taylor	2,766	38.87	
Independent	James Cock	552	7.76	
Total formal votes		7,116	96.72	
Informal votes		241	3.28	
Turnout		7,357	87.72	
United win		(new seat)		

==== Fortitude Valley ====
1925 Brisbane City Council election: Fortitude Valley Ward
Party	Candidate	Votes	%	±%
Labor	James Patrick Keogh	2,834	54.20	
United	James Burrows	2,395	45.80	
Total formal votes		5,229	95.37	
Informal votes		254	4.63	
Turnout		5,483	83.11	
Labor win		(new seat)		

==== Ithaca ====
1925 Brisbane City Council election: Ithaca Ward
Party	Candidate	Votes	%	±%
Labor	William Robert Warmington	2,842	47.54	
United	Leslie Howard Tooth	2,433	40.70	
Independent	Richard James Burnett	703	11.76	
Total formal votes		5,978	94.04	
Informal votes		379	5.96	
Turnout		6,357	86.67	
Labor win		(new seat)		

==== Kelvin Grove ====
1925 Brisbane City Council election: Kelvin Grove Ward
Party	Candidate	Votes	%	±%
United	John Tait	2,942	50.65	
Labor	Thomas Magner	2,866	49.35	
Total formal votes		5,808	96.43	
Informal votes		215	3.57	
Turnout		6,023	85.22	
United win		(new seat)		

==== Kurilpa ====
1925 Brisbane City Council election: Kurilpa Ward
Party	Candidate	Votes	%	±%
United	Ernest Barstow	3,140	58.59	
Labor	Edward Kersley	2,219	41.41	
Total formal votes		5,359	96.21	
Informal votes		211	3.79	
Turnout		5,570	86.00	
United win		(new seat)		

==== Logan ====
1925 Brisbane City Council election: Logan Ward
Party	Candidate	Votes	%	±%
United	John Soden	3,421	48.68	
Labor	Lauchlan Howatson	2,401	34.16	
Independent	William Edward Donnellan	1,206	17.16	
Total formal votes		7,028	95.26	
Informal votes		350	4.74	
Turnout		7,378	87.88	
United win		(new seat)		

==== Maree ====
1925 Brisbane City Council election: Maree Ward
Party	Candidate	Votes	%	±%
Labor	Alexander Elliott	2,901	48.75	
United	George Tedman	2,888	48.53	
Independent	Matthew Colclough Snr	162	2.72	
Total formal votes		5,844	97.04	
Informal votes		178	2.96	
Turnout		6,022	81.15	
Labor win		(new seat)		

==== Merthyr ====
1925 Brisbane City Council election: Merthyr Ward
Party	Candidate	Votes	%	±%
United	James Thomas MacMinn	3,103	53.10	
Labor	Peter Alfred McLachlan	2,741	46.90	
Total formal votes		5,844	97.04	
Informal votes		178	2.96	
Turnout		6,022	81.15	
United win		(new seat)		

==== Nundah ====
1925 Brisbane City Council election: Nundah Ward
Party	Candidate	Votes	%	±%
United	Frederick William Bradbury	3,612	60.36	
Labor	Joseph William Ingham	2,372	39.64	
Total formal votes		5,984	97.24	
Informal votes		170	2.76	
Turnout		6,154	80.44	
United win		(new seat)		

==== Oxley ====
1925 Brisbane City Council election: Oxley Ward
Party	Candidate	Votes	%	±%
United	Fredrick Arthur Stimpson	4,590	68.43	
Labor	Arthur Allen Elliott	2,118	31.57	
Total formal votes		6,708	96.87	
Informal votes		217	3.13	
Turnout		6,925	84.66	
United win		(new seat)		

==== Paddington ====
1925 Brisbane City Council election: Paddington Ward
Party	Candidate	Votes	%	±%
Labor	John Arthur Fihelly	2,917	60.94	
United	William John Smout	1,870	39.06	
Total formal votes		4,787	95.38	
Informal votes		232	4.62	
Turnout		5,019	80.34	
Labor win		(new seat)		

==== Sandgate ====
1925 Brisbane City Council election: Sandgate Ward
Party	Candidate	Votes	%	±%
United	William Frederick Schulz	3,771	59.39	
Labor	Christopher Joseph Keogh	2,579	40.61	
Total formal votes		6,350	95.79	
Informal votes		279	4.21	
Turnout		6,629	85.12	
United win		(new seat)		

==== South Brisbane ====
1925 Brisbane City Council election: South Brisbane Ward
Party	Candidate	Votes	%	±%
United	Robert William Henry Long	2,770	53.87	
Labor	Joseph Patrick Finn	2,372	46.13	
Total formal votes		5,142	96.06	
Informal votes		211	3.94	
Turnout		5,353	80.74	
United win		(new seat)		

==== Toombul ====
1925 Brisbane City Council election: Toombul Ward
Party	Candidate	Votes	%	±%
United	Hugh McDiarmid Russell	3,635	62.63	
Labor	William George Nicholson	1,554	26.77	
Independent	Isaac William Butters	615	10.60	
Total formal votes		6,710	97.23	
Informal votes		191	2.77	
Turnout		6,901	85.26	
United win		(new seat)		

==== Toowong ====
1925 Brisbane City Council election: Toowong Ward
Party	Candidate	Votes	%	±%
United	Archibald Watson	4,607	68.66	
Labor	Edwin August Keefer	2,103	31.34	
Total formal votes		6,710	97.23	
Informal votes		191	2.77	
Turnout		6,901	85.26	
United win		(new seat)		

==== Windsor ====
1925 Brisbane City Council election: Windsor Ward
Party	Candidate	Votes	%	±%
United	Thomas Prentice	3,588	56.28	
Labor	Herbert George Carrigan	2,041	32.02	
Independent	Ernest Downey	746	11.70	
Total formal votes		6,375	95.98	
Informal votes		267	4.02	
Turnout		6,642	85.92	
United win		(new seat)		

==== Wynnum ====
1925 Brisbane City Council election: Wynnum Ward
Party	Candidate	Votes	%	±%
United	William Logan Dart	1,333	28.82	
Independent	John William Greene	1,298	28.06	
Labor	Francis John O'Driscoll	1,115	24.11	
Independent	Joseph Curtis	650	14.05	
Independent	George Heymer	229	4.95	
Total formal votes		4,625	94.99	
Informal votes		244	5.01	
Turnout		4,869	68.22	
United win		(new seat)		

== Candidates ==
Ward	Labor candidate	United candidate	Other candidates
Lord Mayor	John Keogh	William Jolly	
Brisbane	J. P. Teefey	W. J. Foster	
Bulimba	S. Nickson	A. Harrison	
Buranda	A. Laurie	G. W. Bennett	
Enoggera	G. Taylor	E. Lanham	G. Cock (Ind)
Fortitude Valley	J. P. Keogh	James Burrows	
Ithaca	W. R. Warmington	L. H. Tooth	R. J. Burnett (Ind)
Kelvin Grove	T. Magner	J. J. Tait	
Kurilpa	E. Kersley	E. Barstow	
Logan	L. Howatson	J. Soden	W. E. Donnellan (Ind)
Maree	A. Elliott	Geo. Tedman	M. Colclough (Ind)
Merthyr	P. A. McLachlan	J. T. MacMinn	
Nundah	J. W. Ingham	F. W. Bradbury	
Oxley	A. A. Elliott	F. A. Stimpson	
Paddington	John Fihelly	W. J. Smout	
Sandgate	C. J. Keogh	W. F. Schulz	
South Brisbane	J. P. Finn	R. W. H. Long	
Toombul	G. Nicholson	H. M. Russell	
Toowong	E. A. Keefer	A. Watson	
Windsor	H. G. Carrigan	T. Prentice	H. Downey
Wynnum	F. J. O'Driscoll	Bill Dart	John William Greene (Ind); J. Carter (Ind); G. Heymer (Ind)
