= Auchenflower Ward =

Former Brisbane City Council ward

Auchenflower Ward Queensland — Brisbane City Council
- Created: 1973
- Abolished: 1985
- Namesake: Auchenflower

Auchenflower Ward was a Brisbane City Council ward from 1973 to 1985. It covered the suburbs of Auchenflower and St Lucia (except for the St Lucia Golf Links), the majority of Bardon and Toowong, and parts of Milton, Mount Coot-tha, Paddington, Red Hill, and Taringa, in Queensland, Australia. Auchenflower Ward was established for the 1973 election. The ward was abolished for the 1985 election, being replaced by the new Taringa Ward and second Paddington Ward. The ward was represented by Denver Beanland from 1976 to its abolishment in 1985.

== History ==
Auchenflower Ward was established for the 1973 Brisbane City Council election, as part of a reduction in the total number of wards from 28 to 21. At the 1973 election, Auchenflower was one of the twenty wards won by the Labor Party. Auchenflower Ward was centred on the suburb of Auchenflower, and was bound on the east and south-east by the Brisbane River, Indooroopilly Ward to the south and west, The Gap Ward to the north-west, and Central City Ward to the north-east.

At the 1976 election, the ward was won for the Liberal Party by Denver Beanland. Beanland served as the ward's Alderman up until its abolishment at the 1985 election. The ward's area was split between the newly-created Taringa and Paddington wards, with Beanland successfully contesting the new Taringa Ward.

== Councillors for Auchenflower Ward ==
Image	Member	Party	Term	Notes
		Labor	31 March 1973 – 27 March 1976	
	Denver Beanland	Liberal	27 March 1976 – 30 March 1985	Ward abolished. Successfully contested new Taringa Ward at 1985 election.
