= Roy Harvey (politician) =

Australian politician (1921–2006)

Roy Harvey AM
- Harvey in October 1982

11th Lord Mayor of Brisbane
- In office 27 March 1982 – 30 March 1985
- Preceded by: Frank Sleeman
- Succeeded by: Sallyanne Atkinson

Member of the Queensland Legislative Assembly for Stafford
- In office 27 May 1972 – 7 December 1974
- Preceded by: New seat
- Succeeded by: Terry Gygar

Personal details
- Born: William Charles Roy Harvey; 6 January 1921 Brisbane, Queensland, Australia
- Died: 23 April 2006 (aged 85) Caloundra, Queensland, Australia
- Resting place: Pinnaroo Lawn Cemetery
- Party: Labor
- Spouse: Pearl Ruby Jess (m.1949)
- Occupation: Politician

William Charles Roy Harvey (6 January 1921 – 23 April 2006), was an Australian politician who served as Lord Mayor of Brisbane from 1982 until 1985. Harvey was a member of the Labor Party, and represented the party for a total of 27 years on the Council. He was also the member for Stafford in the Queensland Legislative Assembly for one term from 1972-1974.

== History ==
Harvey was first elected as alderman for Kedron Ward, for the Labor Party at the 1952 Brisbane City Council election. He represented the ward for seven consecutive three year terms, finishing at the 1973 election.

He served as the Labor member for Stafford in the Queensland Legislative Assembly from 1972 to 1974, losing the seat to Liberal Party candidate Terry Gygar at the 1974 Queensland state election. He re-contested the seat at the 1977 election, but was unsuccessful.

He was elected for the Brisbane City Council's Mitchelton Ward at the 1979 election, and became Vice-Mayor of the City of Brisbane. He was re-elected at the 1982 election, and was elected as Lord Mayor by the alderman of the newly-formed council. (Note: The lord mayoralty was elected by a vote of the aldermen from 1973 to 1985, rather than being a directly elected position.)

During his time as an alderman, Harvey served on the council's Finance Committee 1953–1955 and as its Chairman 1979–1982, the Health Committee 1955–1957 and the Works Committee 1957–1961. He was also served on the Establishment and Co-Ordination Committee 1961–1973,1979–1982 and as Chairman 1982–1985 and in addition as Chairman of the Council Transit and Electricity Committee 1961–1973.

== Lord Mayor ==
Harvey was elected the position of Lord Mayor of Brisbane in 1982 and served until 1985. His wife, Pearl, acted as Lady Mayoress. His term included Brisbane's hosting of the 1982 Commonwealth Games. His predecessor in office, Frank Sleeman had secured the games for Brisbane. Harvey was defeated when he stood for re-election in 1985 against Liberal candidate, Sallyanne Atkinson. Dying in 2006, Harvey was accorded a state funeral and buried in Pinnaroo Lawn Cemetery.

== Notes ==
Parliament of Queensland
New seat	Member for Stafford; 1972–1974	Succeeded by Terry Gygar
Civic offices
Preceded by Frank Sleeman	Lord Mayor of Brisbane; 1982–1985	Succeeded by Sallyanne Atkinson
