= Robbie Williams (politician) =

Australian politician

Councillor of the City of Brisbane for Holland Park Ward
- In office October 2007 – 20 December 2007
- Preceded by: Kerry Rea
- Succeeded by: Ian McKenzie

Personal details
- Born: 12 June 1962
- Died: 20 December 2007 (aged 45)
- Party: Labor

Robbie Williams (12 June 1962 – 20 December 2007) was the first Indigenous Australian councillor to sit on the Brisbane City Council. He had held the role only since October 2007, but had been tipped to win a seat in the council elections in March 2008. Williams had previously served three terms as a regional councillor with ATSIC and was later the ATSIC commissioner for Brisbane and southeast Queensland. He was widely known for his community work, and was the founder and chair of First Contact Aboriginal Corporation for Youth, an organisation dedicated to improving the lives of indigenous youth, in 1992.

Williams was the son of Hazel, an Aboriginal woman with connections to the Yugambeh language group, and his father was Bob Williams, a butcher. He trained and worked as a butcher for several years before gaining a diploma in Aboriginal and Torres Strait Islander welfare and joining the Australian Public Service, working in the Department of Social Security.

He was married to Trish and had four children. He died of a heart attack at the age of 45 on 20 December 2007.
