= Seal Chong Wah =

Councillor Seal Chong Wah
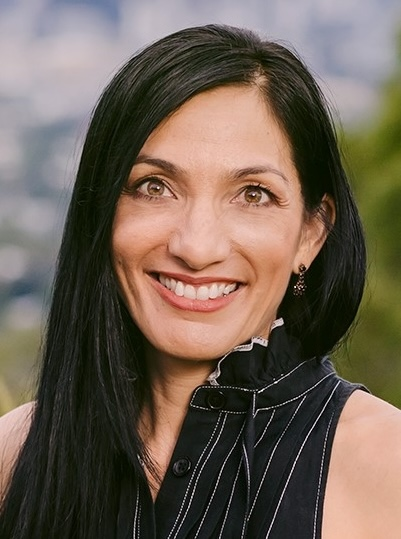

Councillor of the City of Brisbane for Paddington Ward
- Incumbent
- Assumed office 16 March 2024

Personal details
- Born: Brisbane, Queensland, Australia
- Party: Greens
- Children: 2
- Education: Queensland College of Art
- Website: https://sealchongwah.com

Seal Chong Wah is an Australian politician who currently serves as the councillor for Paddington Ward on the City of Brisbane, representing the Queensland Greens. She was elected at the 2024 Brisbane City Council election.

== Early life ==
Seal was adopted at 6 weeks old and was raised with a mix of European/Australian and Chinese cultures by 2 parents. Seal has lived in Brisbane for over 20 years.

== Political career ==
Seal became active in politics due to her frustration with the government's lack of action on the climate crisis. She was previously an Executive Committee Member and secretary of Kelvin Grove State College of the P&C. She won the Paddington seat from the LNP, the second Greens seat on Brisbane City Council. She has been active in the campaign against the siting of a stadium for the 2032 Olympics in Victoria Park (Barrambin).

== Education ==
Seal previously worked in I.T. and has studied a bachelor's degree in visual arts majoring in illustration at Queensland College of Art and Design.

== Personal life ==
Seal enjoys teaching music to her two kids, and has a passion for singing, and playing guitar, piano and violin. She also enjoyed performing in an electro band in Brisbane's live music scene.
