= Taringa Ward =

Australian local government ward

Taringa Ward Queensland — Brisbane City Council
- Created: 1985
- Abolished: 1994
- Namesake: Taringa

Taringa Ward was a Brisbane City Council ward from 1985 to 1994. It covered the present-day suburbs of St Lucia and Taringa, along with the majority of Indooroopilly and Toowong.

The ward was established for the 1985 Brisbane City Council election as part of an increase from 21 to 26 wards. It was created from the southern part of the abolished Auchenflower Ward and the eastern part of the abolished Indooroopilly Ward. It was abolished for the 1994 Brisbane City Council election; its north becoming part of the second Toowong Ward, and its south becoming part of the new Walter Taylor Ward.

The ward was represented by the Liberal Party for the nine years it existed. Denver Beanland was elected for the party in 1985, having represented the abolished Auchenflower Ward since the 1976 election. Beanland resigned in 1986 following his election as the member for Toowong in the Queensland Legislative Assembly, and June O'Connell was elected at the resulting by-election. O'Connell was re-elected in 1988 and 1991.

The ward was abolished for the 1994 election, and O'Connell went on to successfully contest the new Walter Taylor Ward, which she represented until the 2000 election.

== Councillors for Taringa Ward ==
Image	Member	Party	Term	Notes
	Denver Beanland	Liberal	30 March 1985 – 1986	Represented preceding Auchenflower Ward from 1976 until its abolishment. Resigned after winning Toowong at 1986 Queensland state election.
	June O'Connell	Liberal	1986 – 26 March 1994	Elected at 1986 Taringa Ward by-election. Ward abolished. Successfully contested new Walter Taylor Ward at 1994 election.
