= Fred Campbell (Australian politician) =

Australian politician

The Honourable Fred Campbell

Deputy Leader of the Queensland Liberal Party
- In office 13 August 1976 – 23 December 1980
- Leader: William Knox; Llew Edwards
- Preceded by: William Knox
- Succeeded by: Sam Doumany

Member of the Queensland Legislative Assembly for Aspley
- In office 28 May 1960 – 29 November 1980
- Preceded by: New seat
- Succeeded by: Beryce Nelson

Personal details
- Born: Frederick Alexander Campbell; 17 January 1911 Brisbane, Queensland, Australia
- Died: 11 September 1995 (aged 84) Queensland, Australia
- Party: Liberal Party
- Spouse: Ellen McConachie (m.1936 d.2008)
- Occupation: Insurance officer

Frederick Alexander Campbell (17 January 1911 – 11 September 1995) was a member of the Queensland Legislative Assembly.

== Biography ==
Campbell was born in Brisbane, Queensland, the son of Matthew Hale Campbell and his wife Annie Jessie (née Jullyan). He was educated in Brisbane and worked in the family poultry business after he left school. He later was an insurance officer specializing in fire and general insurance.

On 14 May 1936 he married Ellen McConachie (died 2008) and together had a son and two daughters. Campbell died in September 1995 and was cremated at Albany Creek Crematorium.

== Public career ==
Campbell, for the Liberal Party, won the new seat of Aspley at the 1960 Queensland state election. He represented the seat for twenty years before retiring at the 1980 state election.

Nicknamed affectionately as "Chooky" by the then Labor opposition, Campbell held several ministerial portfolios whilst in politics including:

- Minister for Labour Relations 1977–1980
- Minister for Industrial Development 1967–1972
- Minister for Development and Industrial Affairs 1972–1974
- Minister for Industrial Development, Labour Relations and Consumer Affairs 1974–1977
- Minister for Transport 1977
- Deputy Leader of the Parliamentary Liberal Party 1976-1980

Parliament of Queensland
New seat	Member for Aspley; 1960–1980	Succeeded by Beryce Nelson
