= Tracy Davis =

Australian politician

Councillor Tracy Davis

Brisbane City Councillor for McDowall
- Incumbent
- Assumed office 4 June 2019
- Preceded by: Norm Wyndham

Minister for Communities, Child Safety and Disability Services of Queensland
- In office 3 April 2012 – 14 February 2015
- Premier: Campbell Newman
- Preceded by: Karen Struthers (Community Services); Phil Reeves (Child Safety); Curtis Pitt (Disabilities)
- Succeeded by: Shannon Fentiman (Communities and Child Safety); Coralee O'Rourke (Disability Services)
Opposition portfolios
Shadow Minister for Education
In office 6 May 2016 – 25 November 2017
Leader	Tim Nicholls
Preceded by	Tim Mander
Succeeded by	Jarrod Bleijie
Shadow Minister for Communities
In office 14 February 2015 – 6 May 2016
Leader	Lawrence Springborg
Preceded by	Desley Scott
Succeeded by	Ros Bates
Shadow Minister for Child Safety and Disability Services
In office 14 February 2015 – 6 May 2016
Leader	Lawrence Springborg
Preceded by	Desley Scott
Succeeded by	Ros Bates
In office 11 April 2011 – 19 February 2012
Leader	Campbell Newman
Preceded by	Ted Malone (Families and Communities)
Succeeded by	Desley Scott

Member of the Queensland Parliament for Aspley
- In office 21 March 2009 – 25 November 2017
- Preceded by: Bonny Barry
- Succeeded by: Bart Mellish

Personal details
- Born: 8 December 1962 (age 63) Nambour, Australia
- Party: Liberal National Party
- Other political affiliations: Liberal Party
- Children: 3
- Education: Pine Rivers District High School

Tracy Ellen Davis (born 8 December 1962) is an Australian politician. She was a Liberal National Party member of the Legislative Assembly of Queensland from 2009 to 2017, representing the district of Aspley. She currently serves on the Brisbane City Council as the Councillor for McDowall Ward.

== Early life ==
Davis was born in Nambour, Queensland, but attended primary school at East Hills in New South Wales. She attended high school at Pine Rivers, and in 1982 became a receptionist. She became a small business owner in 1995.

== Politics ==
=== Member of parliament ===
In 2009, Davis defeated Labor MP Bonny Barry to win the seat of Aspley for the Liberal National Party. She had previously contested Aspley in 2006 as a Liberal candidate, as well as Everton in 2004.

Davis was appointed the Shadow Minister for Public Transport following a Langbroek Cabinet shuffle in November 2010. In 2011 she was appointed as Shadow Minister for Disability Services, Mental Health and Child Safety.

==== Newman Ministry ====
She served as Minister for Communities, Child Safety and Disabilities in the Newman government.

After the LNP defeat at the 2015 election remained on the front bench as Shadow Minister for Communities, Child Safety and Disability Services under Lawrence Springborg, before moving to Shadow Education portfolio following Tim Nicholls's successful challenge to Springborg.

She lost her seat to Labor candidate Bart Mellish at the 2017 election.

=== Brisbane City Council ===
In 2019 Davis became Brisbane City Councillor for McDowall Ward to replace Councillor Norm Wyndham. She successfully contested the Ward at the 2020 Queensland local government elections, winning 59.2% of the primary vote. The McDowall Ward comprises the suburbs of McDowall, Everton Park and parts of Aspley, Bridgeman Downs, Chermside West, Stafford and Stafford Heights.

As of 2022, Davis is the Civic Cabinet Chair of the Environment, Parks and Sustainability Committee and also previously served on the City Standards Committee. She is also a Lord Mayor's representative for multicultural communities.

Parliament of Queensland
Preceded by Bonny Barry	Member for Aspley; 2009–2017	Succeeded by Bart Mellish
