= Kianawah Ward =

Australian local government ward

Kianawah Ward Queensland — Brisbane City Council
- Created: 1985
- Abolished: 1994

Kianawah Ward was a Brisbane City Council ward from 1985 to 1994. It covered the present-day suburbs of Lota, Lytton, Manly, Port of Brisbane, and Wynnum; the majority of Wynnum West; and parts of Manly West, Ransome Tingalpa, and Wakerley.

The ward was established for the 1985 Brisbane City Council election as part of an increase from 21 to 26 wards. It was created from most of the eastern part of the abolished Waterloo Bay Ward, combined with a small part of Ransome and Wakerley from the retained Carina Ward. It was abolished for the 1994 Brisbane City Council election, and was largely replaced by the Wynnum Manly Ward.

Don Randall of the Labor Party was the only alderman to represent the ward, and had previously represented the Waterloo Bay Ward since 1979. Randall resigned in June 1993 due to poor health, and the ward remained vacant until its abolition at the 1994 election.

== Councillors for Kianawah Ward ==
Image	Member	Party	Term	Notes
	Don Randall	Labor	30 March 1985 – 16 June 1993	Resigned due to poor health.
Vacant			16 June 1993 – 26 March 1994	
