= Brian Cahill =

Australian politician

- In office 22 October 1983 – 1 November 1986
- Preceded by: Beryce Nelson
- Succeeded by: Beryce Nelson

Member of the Queensland Legislative Assembly for Aspley

Personal details
- Born: Brian John Cahill; 16 February 1931
- Died: 8 March 2015 (aged 84)
- Education: Cairns State High School, Nudgee College

Brian John Cahill MBE (16 February 1931 – 8 March 2015) was an Australian radio and television presenter, newsreader and politician who worked first in radio, and then in television from 1959 until 1982. In 1983, Cahill was elected to the Parliament of Queensland, as the member for Aspley, Brisbane until 1986. Following this, he returned to his first profession, teaching, and continued a lifelong commitment to musical theatre. In 1984, with wife Denise, he formed the Queensland Musical Theatre, of which he was President and (often) a lead performer in its productions.

Cahill was born in Innisfail in 1931 and attended Cairns State High School and St Joseph's College, Nudgee. After leaving school, he moved to Brisbane to train as a teacher, and was posted to far north Queensland, where he worked in schools at Almaden and Tully Falls. Blessed with a rich, resonant voice and excellent diction, he began working as an announcer at commercial radio station 4CA Cairns - the start of his long career in broadcasting. In 1955, he married Pamela Holmes and moved to Melbourne, where he taught at Essendon Grammar School. He continued part-time as a broadcaster at 3TR Sale, until returning to a position as an announcer and newsreader at 4BC Brisbane. In 1959, Channel 7 was preparing to launch in Brisbane and Cahill became the station's first newsreader on its opening night, 1 November 1959. He worked as a news anchor for all three commercial television stations in Brisbane over the following 23 years, concluding at Channel 0 (10) in 1982, the same year in which he was Director of Radio Operations for the XII Commonwealth Games, staged in Brisbane from 30 September to 9 October.

He had returned to daytime teaching in 1973, at St Joseph's College, Gregory Terrace, Brisbane, in tandem with his evening television work. He served as subject head of both English and History at Terrace until his departure in 1980, to return to the 4BC newsroom as breakfast newsreader and journalist. Following a lifetime interest in politics, Cahill won pre-selection as the National Party candidate for the state seat of Aspley, in Brisbane's northern suburbs, in early 1983 and won the seat in that year's election. In a damaging internal party brawl, he was narrowly disendorsed as the Nationals' candidate for the seat in the 1986 election and retired from Parliament. He would later serve for 15 years as the Secretary of the Former Parliamentary Members Association (Qld).

In later life, he returned to teaching, at Wynnum State High School and rekindled his career as an actor and musical theatre performer, appearing in a range of professional and semi-professional stage and television productions.

In 1980, he was awarded an MBE (Member of the Order of the British Empire) in recognition of his service to the community and to radio and television news. He died on 8 March 2015. He was survived by his second wife, Denise (married 1966), three children and two stepchildren.
