= Beryce Nelson =

Australian politician

Member of the Queensland Legislative Assembly for Aspley
- In office 29 November 1980 – 22 October 1983
- Preceded by: Fred Campbell
- Succeeded by: Brian Cahill
- In office 1 November 1986 – 2 December 1989
- Preceded by: Brian Cahill
- Succeeded by: John Goss

Personal details
- Born: Beryce Ann Noble; 10 January 1947 (age 79) Brisbane, Queensland, Australia
- Party: National Party
- Other political affiliations: Liberal Party
- Spouse: John Arthur Nelson (m.1968)
- Education: University of Queensland
- Occupation: Radiographer

Beryce Ann Nelson, née Noble (born 10 January 1947) is a former Australian politician.

She was born in Brisbane to Arthur Lloyd Noble and Thelma Ann, née Kelso. She attended state schools at Toowoomba and Brisbane and studied radiography from 1965 to 1967, earning a diploma and winning the Kodak Student Prize for research. On 24 August 1968 she married John Arthur Nelson, with whom she had three children. From 1967 to 1971 she worked as a radiographer, and in 1979 she commenced a Bachelor of Arts degree majoring in government and history at the University of Queensland. Beryce was one of the founders of the Down Syndrome Association of Queensland and during her time as president from 1978 to 1980 also worked as their public relations officer until her election to the Queensland Legislative Assembly in 1980 as the Liberal member for Aspley. In 1983 she was the first woman appointed to the role of Government Deputy Whip in Australia but lost her seat in October of that year following the collapse of the Coalition Government. In 1984 she resigned from the Liberal Party and established her own PR company. In 1985 she joined the National Party, easily winning her seat back in 1986. Between 1986 and 1989 she held a number of junior cabinet positions including the Chair of the Brisbane River Management Committee and in September 1989 was promoted to the front bench as Minister for Family Services, the third woman appointed a minister in Queensland. She lost her seat some months later at the election which saw the Nationals lose office.

In the 1990s she returned to the world of public relations working as a senior consultant, then State Manager, for the Rowland Company in Queensland and in 1994 started her own business Jigsaw Public Relations, which ran successfully for ten years until she sold it in 2003. During that decade she also served on a number of state and national boards including Energex Ltd, Musica Viva and the Abused Child Trust - now Act for Kids. In 2001 she also returned to academic life part-time and in 2005 completed a Masters in Management at the University of Southern Queensland, then worked as a lecturer at the Brisbane campus of James Cook University until retiring in 2010. Following her retirement, Beryce made a life changing move to the country town of Toogoolawah in Queensland where she became part of a group involved in the establishment of a recently completed cultural heritage project and in 2013 she married Canadian/Australian artist Merton Chambers.

Parliament of Queensland
| Preceded by Fred Campbell | Member for Aspley; 1980–1983 | Succeeded by Brian Cahill |
| Preceded by Brian Cahill | Member for Aspley; 1986–1989 | Succeeded by John Goss |
