= Bonny Barry =

Australian politician

Member of the Queensland Legislative Assembly for Aspley
- In office 17 February 2001 – 20 March 2009
- Preceded by: John Goss
- Succeeded by: Tracy Davis

Personal details
- Born: 30 January 1960 (age 66) Blackall, Queensland, Australia
- Party: Labor
- Occupation: Registered Nurse

Veronica Lesley "Bonny" Barry (born 30 January 1960) is an Australian politician. She was a Labor member of the Legislative Assembly of Queensland from 2001 to 2009, representing the district of Aspley.

Barry was first elected to parliament at the 2001 state election when she defeated incumbent Liberal MP John Goss. Barry served as Labor caucus chair during her eight years in parliament, and also as a parliamentary secretary from September 2006. Seeking a fourth term at the 2009 state election, she was defeated by Liberal National candidate Tracy Davis.

Barry was born in the Queensland town of Blackall. She is married, with one daughter and three sons. She is a registered nurse with over twenty years experience. Barry has recently successfully recovered from cancer.

Parliament of Queensland
| Preceded by John Goss | Member for Aspley; 2001–2009 | Succeeded by Tracy Davis |
