= Electoral district of Aspley =

State electoral district of Queensland, Australia

Aspley Queensland—Legislative Assembly
- Map of the electoral district of Aspley, 2017
- State: Queensland
- Dates current: 1960–present
- MP: Bart Mellish
- Party: Labor
- Namesake: Aspley
- Electors: 37,792 (2020)
- Area: 36 km^{2} (13.9 sq mi)
- Demographic: Outer-metropolitan
- Coordinates: 27°20′S 153°0′E
Electorates around Aspley:
Pine Rivers	Pine Rivers	Murrumba
Everton	Aspley	Sandgate
Everton	Stafford	Nudgee

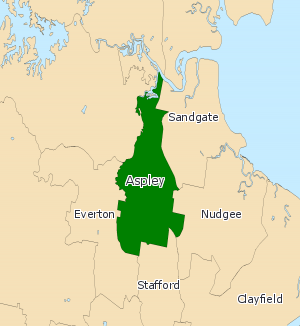
2008 map of Aspley

Aspley is an electoral district of the Legislative Assembly in the Australian state of Queensland.

The district is located in the north-eastern residential suburbs of Brisbane, encompassing Aspley, Bridgeman Downs and Carseldine, as well as parts of McDowall, Chermside West, Bald Hills, Geebung and Zillmere. It is now wholly within the local government area of Brisbane City Council, following the redistribution prior to the 2009 election.

The electorate was created at the 1959 redistribution from the former electorate of Chermside. Aspley was a safe Liberal seat until the collapse of the National-Liberal coalition in Queensland in 1983, when first-term Liberal member Beryce Nelson lost the seat to the Nationals' Brian Cahill a former local newsreader. Nelson then joined the Nationals and was subsequently preselected to contest Aspley at the 1986 election. She won and held the seat for that term and then was defeated by the Liberals' John Goss in 1989. Goss was defeated by Labor's Bonny Barry in Labor's landslide victory at the 2001 state election. Barry was herself defeated after three terms by Tracy Davis of the Liberal National Party at the 2009 state election. Davis was defeated at the 2017 state election by Labor's Bart Mellish. Mellish defeated former politician Amanda Cooper at the 2020 state election. Cooper again contested the 2024 state election but lost by a very close 31 vote margin to Mellish. Mellish was ultimately successful in retaining the electorate.

== Members for Aspley ==
Member	Party	Term
Fred Campbell	Liberal	1960–1980
Beryce Nelson	Liberal	1980–1983
Brian Cahill	National	1983–1986
Beryce Nelson	National	1986–1989
John Goss	Liberal	1989–2001
Bonny Barry	Labor	2001–2009
Tracy Davis	Liberal National	2009–2017
Bart Mellish	Labor	2017–present

== Election results ==
2024 Queensland state election: Aspley
Party	Candidate	Votes	%	±%
Liberal National	Amanda Cooper	15,696	43.91	+3.41
Labor	Bart Mellish	13,988	39.13	−6.38
Greens	Fiona Hawkins	3,817	10.68	+1.74
One Nation	Allan Hall	1,539	4.30	+0.90
Family First	Wayne Capell	707	1.98	+1.98
Total formal votes		35,747	96.96	−0.96
Informal votes		1,119	3.04	+0.96
Turnout		36,866	92.17	+1.57
Two-party-preferred result
Labor	Bart Mellish	17,889	50.04	−5.12
Liberal National	Amanda Cooper	17,858	49.96	+5.12
Labor hold		Swing	–5.12	
