= Bart Mellish =

Australian politician

The Honourable Bart Mellish MP
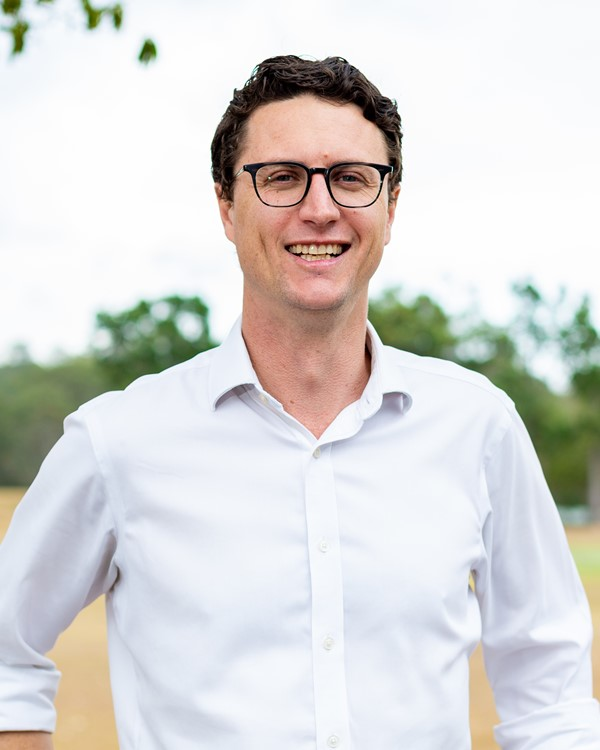

Shadow Minister for Transport and Main Roads
- Incumbent
- Assumed office 8 November 2024
- Leader: Steven Miles
- Preceded by: Steve Minnikin

Shadow Minister for Veterans
- Incumbent
- Assumed office 8 November 2024
- Leader: Steven Miles
- Preceded by: James Lister (as Shadow Assistant Minister for Veterans)
Ministerial positions
Minister for Transport and Main Roads
In office 18 December 2023 – 28 October 2024
Premier	Steven Miles
Preceded by	Mark Bailey
Succeeded by	Brent Mickelberg
Minister for Digital Services
In office 18 December 2023 – 28 October 2024
Premier	Steven Miles
Preceded by	Mark Bailey
Assistant Minister to the Premier for Veterans Affairs and the Public Sector
In office 18 May 2023 – 18 December 2023
Premier	Annastacia Palaszczuk; Steven Miles
Preceded by	Himself (as Assistant Minister to the Premier for Trade, Veterans Affairs and COVID Economic Recovery)
Succeeded by	Jimmy Sullivan (as Assistant Minister for Justice and Veterans Affairs)
Assistant Minister to the Premier for Veterans Affairs, Trade and COVID Economic Recovery
In office 18 November 2020 – 18 May 2023
Premier	Annastacia Palaszczuk
Preceded by	Jennifer Howard (as Assistant Minister of State Assisting the Premier and Assistant Minister for Veterans Affairs)
Succeeded by	Himself (as Assistant Minister to the Premier for Veterans Affairs and the Public Sector)

Member of the Queensland Parliament for Aspley
- Incumbent
- Assumed office 25 November 2017
- Preceded by: Tracy Davis

Personal details
- Born: 25 April 1983 (age 43) Toowoomba, Queensland
- Party: Labor
- Education: University of Southern Queensland
- Website: www.bartmellish.com

Bart John Mellish (born 25 April 1983) is an Australian politician. He has been a Labor member of the Queensland Legislative Assembly since 2017, representing the electorate of Aspley.

== Early life and career ==
Born in Toowoomba, Queensland, Mellish completed his tertiary education at the University of Southern Queensland completing a Bachelor of Science and post-graduate certificate in Environmental Management, as well as completing a Master of Business Administration, specialising in Environmental Management. Before entering politics, he was a transport and economic policy advisor, environmental consultant, rail consultant and policy advisor, and Chief of Staff to Senator Anthony Chisholm.

== Political career ==
Mellish was elected to the Legislative Assembly at the 2017 state election, defeating former Newman Government minister Tracy Davis with a 4.3% swing. He was re-elected at the 2020 election, defeating LNP candidate and former Brisbane City Councillor Amanda Cooper with a 4% swing, increasing his margin to 5.4%. After his re-election, Mellish was promoted to the position of Assistant Minister to the Premier for Veterans' Affairs, Trade and COVID Economic Recovery.

In September 2021 Mellish was one of three Labor Members of the Legislative Assembly to vote against the Voluntary Assisted Dying Bill 2021. Members had been permitted to exercise a conscience vote on the Bill, which ultimately passed.

Following the appointment of Steven Miles as Premier of Queensland in December 2023, Mellish joined the Cabinet of Queensland as Minister for Transport and Main Roads, and Minister for Digital Services in the Miles ministry.

Mellish was re-elected for a third term in 2024, with a 0.04% margin of victory. Following the defeat of the Labor Party at the election, Mellish became the Shadow Minister for Transport and Main Roads and Shadow Minister for Veterans in the Queensland State Opposition.

Mellish is a member of the Labor Right faction of the Australian Labor Party.

Parliament of Queensland
Preceded by Tracy Davis	Member for Aspley; 2017–present	Incumbent
