= Sallyanne Atkinson =

Australian politician (born 1942)

Sallyanne Atkinson AO
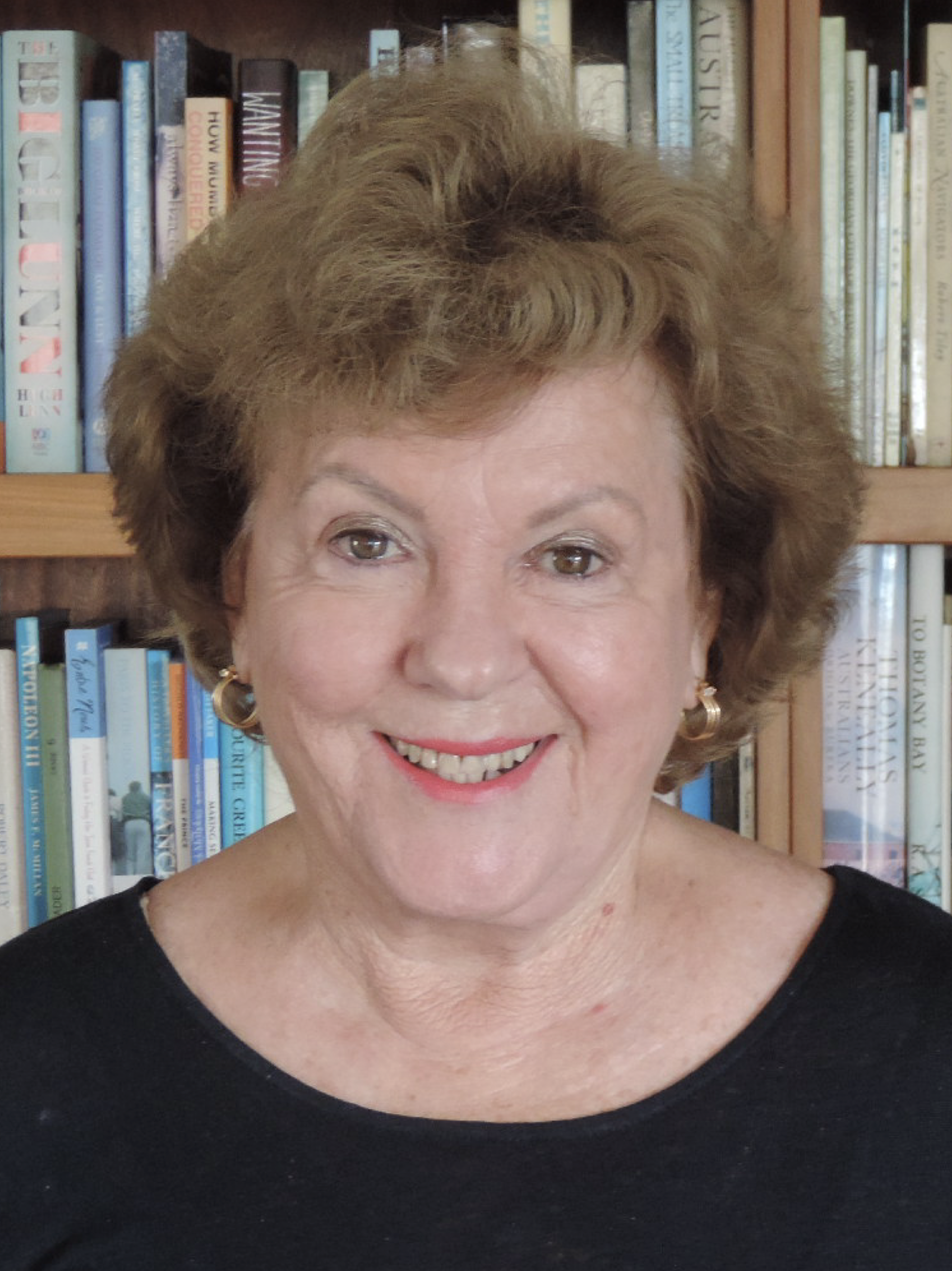
- Atkinson in 2017

12th Lord Mayor of Brisbane
- In office 1985–1991
- Preceded by: Roy Harvey
- Succeeded by: Jim Soorley

Personal details
- Born: Sallyanne Kerr; 23 July 1942 (age 84) Sydney, Australia
- Party: Liberal Party
- Other political affiliations: Liberal National Party
- Spouse: Leigh Atkinson (m. 1964–1995)
- Education: University of Queensland
- Occupation: Politician, journalist, businessperson, lobbyist
- Website: www.sallyanneatkinson.com.au

Sallyanne Atkinson AO (born 23 July 1942, née Kerr) is an Australian former politician who served as Lord Mayor of Brisbane from 1985 to 1991 in Queensland, Australia. She is the only woman to have held the position. As of 2017, she was Chairman of the Museum of Brisbane, President of the Council of The Women's College at the University of Queensland and chair of the advisory board of the Queensland Brain Institute at the University of Queensland.

== Early life ==
Atkinson was born in Sydney. She attended Bishop's College and the Royal Naval School in Colombo, Sri Lanka and completed her secondary education at St Hilda's School on Queensland's Gold Coast. In 1960 she began an Arts degree at the University of Queensland, before becoming a journalist on the Brisbane Telegraph from 1960 to 1962, the Sydney Telegraph from 1962 to 1963, and the Courier Mail from 1963 to 1964. She completed her Bachelor of Arts degree in 1967, majoring in History and Political Science.

After joining the Liberal Party in the early 1970s, Atkinson worked as a research assistant to the Hon Jim Killen, Minister for Defence, from 1975 to 1978, before being elected as Alderman for Indooroopilly in the Brisbane City Council in 1979.

She also wrote a number of books, including Sallyanne Atkinson's Brisbane Guide which was released in 1985.

== Lord Mayor of Brisbane ==
Sallyanne Atkinson was elected Lord Mayor in 1985, after defeating the Labor incumbent Roy Harvey. She became the first female Lord Mayor of Brisbane, as well as the first from the Liberal Party.

She was eventually defeated in 1991 in a narrow upset election win by Jim Soorley, who received preferences from the Greens candidate Drew Hutton.

== Subsequent career ==
After leaving the position as Lord Mayor of Brisbane, she became the first woman on the boards of several major companies, including Caltex, She unsuccessfully ran as the Liberal candidate for the federal seat of Rankin at the 1993 election.

Atkinson was then Australia's Senior Trade Commissioner to France from 1994–1997. Her role was to promote Australian exports and encourage investment in Australia. She was also Australia's representative to the International Chamber of Commerce. While a representative of the Australian Olympic Committee, she supported the Olympic bids of many cities around Australia, including the Brisbane bid for the 1992 Summer Olympics and the successful Sydney 2000 Olympics Bid. In France she was the European Representative for the Sydney Olympic Committee. She was subsequently made the Deputy Mayor of the athletes' village.

Atkinson was awarded Australian Catholic University's (ACU National) highest honour, Doctor of the University (honoris causa), at the Brisbane Campus graduation ceremony held at the Brisbane Convention & Exhibition Centre on 2 April 2004. ACU National Vice-Chancellor, Professor Peter Sheehan AO, said the award recognises Ms Atkinson's extraordinary contribution to Australia's international reputation as a location for sporting events, and her contribution to government and the community. "Through her many years of generous service, in particular her work on the Olympic bids for Brisbane and Sydney and as Deputy Mayor of the Olympic Village at the Sydney 2000 Olympics, Ms Atkinson has contributed to Australia's eminent status in world sport. In 1993 Ms Atkinson was created an Officer of the Order of Australia for service to local government and the community, and in 2001 she was awarded a Centenary Medal for service to local government and to business. Professor Peter Sheehan AO stated during an ACU Graduation Address in 2004, "Sallyanne Atkinson is a most distinguished Australian, an eminent Queenslander, and has brought great credit to the city of Brisbane." She was also awarded Honorary Doctorates from Griffith University and the University of Queensland.

In the early 2000's Sallyanne served as a board member and then chairperson of Binna Burra Lodge, in Lamington National Park.

Sallyanne Atkinson was chairman in Queensland for Barton Deakin Government Relations, providing strategic advice to businesses and not-for-profits on working with government from 2012 to 2015.

== Honours and awards ==
- 1993 – Officer of the Order of Australia
- 2001 – Australian Sports Medal
- 2001 – Centenary Medal

Atkinson has been honoured by Rotary International, is an Honorary Fellow for the Australian Institute of Management, and is an honorary Life Member of the National Trust. The French Government made her a Chevalier of the Ordre National du Merite.

She served as founding member of the board of the United Nations' International Council for Local Environmental Initiatives, a role in which she chaired the first meeting at the UN in New York, and was the founding co-president with Sir Gustav Nossal of Sustainable Development Australia.

In 2014, Atkinson was a recipient of the Queensland Greats Awards.

== Published works ==
- Atkinson, Sallyanne (1977), Around Brisbane : including Gold Coast, Sunshine Coast and Toowoomba, University of Queensland Press (published 1978), ISBN 978-0-7022-1166-9
- Atkinson, Sallyanne (2016), No job for a woman, St Lucia, Queensland University of Queensland Press, ISBN 978-0-7022-5411-6 (autobiography)

Civic offices
Preceded by Roy Harvey	Lord Mayor of Brisbane; 1985–1991	Succeeded by Jim Soorley
