= Amanda Cooper (politician) =

Australian politician

Member of Brisbane City Council for Bracken Ridge Ward
- In office 2007–2019

Personal details
- Party: Liberal National

Amanda Cooper was an Australian politician.

== Career ==
Amanda Cooper was councillor for Bracken Ridge ward in the Brisbane City Council for twelve years from 2007 to 2019. Amanda was chairwoman of the Council's infrastructure committee from 2016 to 2019.

She resigned from her role in 2019 to unsuccessfully seek election to the Legislative Assembly of Queensland in the seat of Aspley in the 2020 Queensland state election.

Amanda was Metropolitan Vice-President of the Liberal National Party of Queensland from 2021 to 2024.

Amanda again sought election to the seat of Aspley in the 2024 Queensland state election. The incumbent MP Bart Mellish retained the seat by 31 votes with a margin of 0.04%, being the most marginal seat in the state.
