= 1973 Brisbane City Council election =

Australian local election

- 31 March 1973

All 21 seats on Brisbane City Council
	First party	Second party
		BCP
Leader	Clem Jones	John Andrews
Party	Labor	Brisbane Civic
Leader's seat	Camp Hill	Mitchelton (lost seat)
Seats won	20 wards	1 ward
Lord Mayor before election
Clem Jones
Labor
Subsequent Lord Mayor
Clem Jones
Labor

The 1973 Brisbane City Council election was held on 31 March 1973 to elect 21 aldermen to the City of Brisbane. The election was held as part of the statewide local government elections in Queensland, Australia.

The Labor Party defeated the Brisbane Civic Party (BCP) in a landslide victory, winning 20 out of 21 wards. This was despite changes introduced by the Bjelke-Petersen state government before the election, which reduced the number of wards and removed the direct lord mayoral election.

== Background ==
Prior to the election, the Country Party state government reduced the number of wards from 28 to 21, and removed the direct election for lord mayor. This meant incumbent Clem Jones had to contest a ward, and the lord mayor was elected by a vote of aldermen after the election. The changes were aimed at Labor, who had controlled the mayoralty since 1961.

After another defeat in 1970, the Citizens' Municipal Organisation (CMO) was described as "moribund" and did not contest the election. Instead, the Brisbane Civic Party was formed and led by Mitchelton Ward councillor John Andrews.

== Results ==
The BCP won just one ward − Indooroopilly − while Andrews lost his seat in Mitchelton.

=== Ward summary ===
Ward	Party	Alderman	Margin (%)
Acacia	Labor	Clarrie O'Sullivan	
Annerley	Labor		
Auchenflower	Labor		
Banyo	Labor		
Bramble Bay	Labor		
Camp Hill	Labor	Clem Jones	
Carina	Labor		
Central City	Labor		
Chermside	Labor		
Colmslie	Labor		
Corinda	Labor	Gordon Thomson	
Hamilton	Labor	Beatrice Elizabeth Dawson	
Indooroopilly	Brisbane Civic Party	Lex Ord	
Lutwyche	Labor		
Mitchelton	Labor		
Nathan	Labor		
Sunnybank	Labor		
The Gap	Labor		
Toombul	Labor		
Waterloo Bay	Labor	Eric Shaw	
Woolloongabba	Labor		

== Aftermath ==
Following the BCP's loss, the Liberal Party decided to endorse candidates, starting at the 1976 election. The CMO disbanded around this time.
