= John Goss (politician) =

Australian politician

Member of the Queensland Legislative Assembly for Aspley
- In office 2 December 1989 – 17 February 2001
- Preceded by: Beryce Nelson
- Succeeded by: Bonny Barry

Personal details
- Born: John Nelson Goss; 1 January 1943 (age 83) Brisbane, Queensland, Australia
- Party: Liberal Party
- Occupation: Civil Engineer, Draftsman

John Nelson Goss (born 1 January 1943) is a former Australian politician. He was the Liberal member for Aspley in the Legislative Assembly of Queensland from 1989 to 2001.

== Early life and political career ==
Goss was born in Brisbane and attended the Queensland Institute of Technology, receiving a Certificate in Civil Engineering Drafting. He served on Brisbane City Council from 1982 to 1989. He left the council in 1989 to stand for election to the Queensland Parliament, winning Aspley for the Liberal Party. He became the Liberal Party's spokesman for Transport and Administrative Services in February 1990, exchanging Administrative Services for Housing in August. Following the resumption of the Coalition between the Liberal and National parties, he became Shadow Minister for Housing, Planning and Urban Transport from November 1992 until 1995 and then serving as a backbencher until 2000, when he became Shadow Minister for Fair Trading and Consumer Affairs. He was defeated at the 2001 state election.

He was of no relation to Wayne Goss, the Labor Premier from 1989 to 1996.

In fact Wayne Goss became premier at the same time John Goss entered Parliament in 1989.

Parliament of Queensland
Preceded by Beryce Nelson	Member for Aspley; 1989–2001	Succeeded by Bonny Barry
