= Enoggera Ward =

Electoral ward of Brisbane, Australia

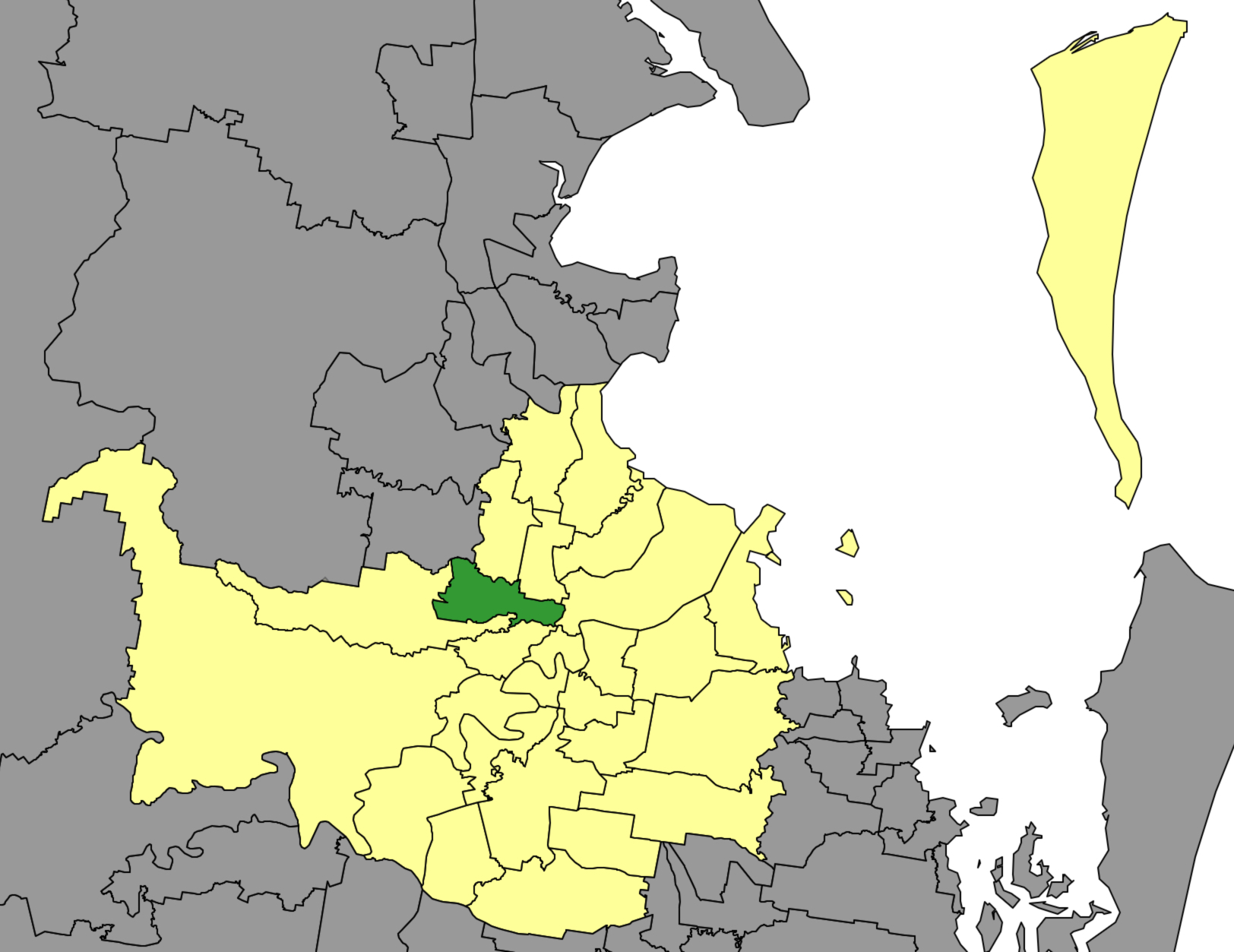
- Dates current: 1925–1952; 1985–present
- Councillor: Andrew Wines
- Party: Liberal National
- Namesake: Enoggera
- Electors: 32,791 (2024)
Electorates around Enoggera Ward:
| The Gap | McDowall | Marchant; Hamilton |
| The Gap | Enoggera Ward | Hamilton |
| The Gap | The Gap; Paddington | Paddington |

The Enoggera Ward is a Brisbane City Council ward in Queensland, Australia, covering Enoggera, Gaythorne, Mitchelton, Newmarket, Wilston and parts of Alderley, Ashgrove, Grange, Keperra and Windsor.

== Councillors for Enoggera Ward ==
=== First incarnation ===
| Image | Councillor | Party | Term | Notes |
|---|---|---|---|---|
| | Ernest Lanham | United | 21 February 1925 – 12 May 1925 | |
| | Ernest Lanham | Nationalist Civic | 12 May 1925 – 1937 | Lost 1937 election. |
| | C. Gilles | Labor | 1937 – 27 April 1940 | Lost 1940 election. |
| | Ernest Lanham | Citizens' Municipal Organisation | 27 April 1940 – 16 December 1949 | Died in office. |
| | J. H. Robertson | Citizens' Municipal Organisation | 7 January 1950 – 31 May 1952 | Won by-election. Ward abolished. |

=== Second incarnation ===
| Image | Councillor | Party | Term | Notes |
|---|---|---|---|---|
| | Brian Mellifont | Labor | 30 March 1985 – 26 March 1994 | |
| | Ann Bennison | Labor | 26 March 1994 – 15 March 2008 | Did not re-contest ward at 2008 election. |
| | Andrew Wines | Liberal | 15 March 2008 – 26 July 2008 | |
| | Andrew Wines | Liberal National | 26 July 2008 – present | Incumbent. |

== Results ==
=== 2024 ===
2024 Queensland local elections: Enoggera Ward
| Party | Candidate | Votes | % | ±% |
|---|---|---|---|---|
| Liberal National | Andrew Wines | 12,467 | 45.38 | +0.28 |
| Greens | Quintessa Denniz | 8,487 | 30.89 | +14.79 |
| Labor | Taylar Wojtasik | 6,521 | 23.73 | −10.77 |
| Total formal votes | | 27,475 | 98.27 | |
| Informal votes | | 485 | 1.73 | |
| Turnout | | 27,960 | 85.26 | |
Two-candidate-preferred result
| Liberal National | Andrew Wines | 13,428 | 53.24 | + 1.34 |
| Greens | Quintessa Denniz | 11,990 | 46.76 | +46.76 |
| Liberal National hold | | Swing | +1.34 | |

=== 2020 ===
2020 Queensland local elections: Enoggera Ward
| Party | Candidate | Votes | % | ±% |
|---|---|---|---|---|
| Liberal National | Andrew Wines | 10,703 | 45.1 | −4.4 |
| Labor | Jonty Bush | 8,169 | 34.4 | +0.3 |
| Greens | Ell-Leigh Ackerman | 3,821 | 16.1 | −0.2 |
| Independent | Craig Whiteman | 645 | 2.7 | +2.7 |
| Independent | Kristin Perissinotto | 387 | 1.6 | +1.6 |
| Total formal votes | | 23,725 | | |
| Informal votes | | 517 | | |
| Turnout | | 24,242 | | |
Two-party-preferred result
| Liberal National | Andrew Wines | 11,110 | 51.8 | −3.2 |
| Labor | Jonty Bush | 10,325 | 48.2 | +3.2 |
| Liberal National hold | | Swing | −3.2 | |

=== 2016 ===
2016 Queensland local elections: Enoggera Ward
| Party | Candidate | Votes | % | ±% |
|---|---|---|---|---|
| Liberal National | Andrew Wines | 12,235 | 49.6 | −7.6 |
| Labor | Amanda Ronan-Hearn | 8,568 | 34.7 | +6.8 |
| Greens | Kirsty Ksiazek | 3,872 | 15.7 | +3.0 |
| Total formal votes | | 24,675 | - | − |
| Informal votes | | 561 | - | − |
| Turnout | | 25,236 | - | − |
Two-party-preferred result
| Liberal National | Andrew Wines | 12,563 | 54.8 | −9.4 |
| Labor | Amanda Ronan-Hearn | 10,378 | 45.2 | +9.4 |
| Liberal National hold | | Swing | −1.2 | |

=== 2004 ===
2004 Brisbane City Council election: Enoggera Ward
| Party | Candidate | Votes | % | ±% |
|---|---|---|---|---|
| Labor | Ann Bennison | 9,971 | 51.57 | |
| Liberal | Colin Farquhar | 6,978 | 36.09 | |
| Greens | Matthew Harris | 2,387 | 12.34 | |
| Total formal votes | | 19,336 | 97.94 | |
| Informal votes | | 406 | 2.06 | |
| Turnout | | 19,742 | 86.33 | |
Two-party-preferred result
| Labor | Ann Bennison | 10,621 | 59.48 | |
| Liberal | Colin Farquhar | 7,236 | 40.52 | |
| Labor hold | | Swing | | |

=== 1931 ===
1931 Brisbane City Council election: Enoggera Ward
| Party | Candidate | Votes | % | ±% |
|---|---|---|---|---|
| Labor | James McGuire | 899 | 34.44 | |
| Nationalist Civic | Ernest Lanham | 755 | 28.93 | |
| Civic Reform | Stanley Chapman | 737 | 28.24 | |
| Ind. Progressive | Cecil Snartt | 219 | 8.39 | |
| Total formal votes | | 2,610 | 97.79 | |
| Informal votes | | 59 | 2.21 | |
| Turnout | | 2,669 | 74.24 | |
Two-party-preferred result
| Nationalist Civic | Ernest Lanham | 1,407 | 53.91 | |
| Labor | James McGuire | 1,203 | 46.09 | |
| Nationalist Civic hold | | Swing | | |
