= The Gap Ward =

Brisbane City Council ward

The Gap Ward Queensland — Brisbane City Council
- Created: 1973
- Councillor: Steve Toomey
- Party: Liberal National
- Namesake: The Gap
- Electors: 32,969 (2024)

The Gap Ward is a Brisbane City Council ward covering The Gap, Ferny Grove, Upper Kedron and parts of Ashgrove, Bardon and Keperra.

== Councillors for The Gap Ward ==
Image	Councillor	Party	Term	Notes
		Labor	31 March 1973 – 27 March 1976	Lost election
	John Andrews	Liberal	27 March 1976 – 27 March 1982	
	Brian Hallinan	Liberal	27 March 1982 – 15 March 1997	
	Geraldine Knapp	Liberal	15 March 1997 – 26 July 2008	
	Geraldine Knapp	Liberal National	26 July 2008 – 23 June 2015	Resigned
	Steve Toomey	Liberal National	23 June 2015 – present	Appointed to fill casual vacancy. Incumbent

== Results ==
=== 2024 ===
2024 Queensland local elections: The Gap Ward
Party	Candidate	Votes	%	±%
Liberal National	Steven Toomey	15,210	52.44	+1.87
Greens	Ann Aitken	8,026	27.67	+10.71
Labor	Ben Long	5,767	19.88	−10.85
Total formal votes		29,003	98.30	+0.24
Informal votes		502	1.70	−0.24
Turnout		29,505	89.49	+6.44
Two-candidate-preferred result
Liberal National	Steven Toomey	16,054	60.16	+3.06
Greens	Ann Aitken	10,632	39.84	+39.84
Liberal National hold		Swing	+3.06	

=== 2020 ===
2020 Queensland local elections: The Gap Ward
Party	Candidate	Votes	%	±%
Liberal National	Steven Toomey	12,872	50.6	+0.8
Labor	Daniel Bevis	7,822	30.7	−4.4
Greens	Rebecca Haley	4,317	17.0	+1.9
Independent	Allen Hassall	443	1.7	+1.7
Total formal votes		25,454		
Informal votes		504		
Turnout		25,958		
Two-party-preferred result
Liberal National	Steven Toomey	13,335	57.1	+2.4
Labor	Daniel Bevis	10,039	42.9	−2.4
Liberal National hold		Swing	+2.4	

=== 2016 ===
2016 Queensland local elections: The Gap Ward
Party	Candidate	Votes	%	±%
Liberal National	Steve Toomey	12,903	50.6	−12.2
Labor	Shane Bevis	8,670	34	+13.3
Greens	Reece Walters	3,920	15.4	−0.4
Total formal votes		25,493	-	−
Informal votes		521	-	−
Turnout		26,014	-	−
Two-party-preferred result
Liberal National	Steve Toomey	13,356	55.7	−15.4
Labor	Shane Bevis	10,639	44.3	+15.4
Liberal National hold		Swing	−15.4	

=== 2004 ===
2004 Brisbane City Council election: The Gap Ward
Party	Candidate	Votes	%	±%
Liberal	Geraldine Knapp	11,305	59.18	
Labor	David Nelson	4,789	25.07	
Greens	Mike Stasse	3,009	15.75	
Total formal votes		19,103	98.69	
Informal votes		253	1.31	
Turnout		19,356	87.01	
Two-party-preferred result
Liberal	Geraldine Knapp	11,760	66.99	
Labor	David Nelson	5,796	33.01	
Liberal hold		Swing		
