= Electoral results for the Division of Lilley =

Australian division election results

This is a list of electoral results for the Division of Lilley in Australian federal elections from the division's creation in 1913 until the present.

== Members ==
Member	Party	Term
Jacob Stumm	Liberal	1913–1917
George Mackay	Nationalist	1917–1931
George Mackay	United Australia	1931–1934
Sir Donald Cameron	United Australia	1934–1937
William Jolly	United Australia	1937–1943
Jim Hadley	Labor	1943–1949
Bruce Wight	Liberal	1949–1961
Don Cameron	Labor	1961–1963
Kevin Cairns	Liberal	1963–1972
Frank Doyle	Labor	1972–1974
Kevin Cairns	Liberal	1974–1980
Elaine Darling	Labor	1980–1993
Wayne Swan	Labor	1993–1996
Elizabeth Grace	Liberal	1996–1998
Wayne Swan	Labor	1998–2019
Anika Wells	Labor	2019–present

== Election results ==
=== Elections in the 2020s ===
==== 2025 ====
2025 Australian federal election: Lilley
Party	Candidate	Votes	%	±%
Trumpet of Patriots	Joshua Morrison			
Labor	Anika Wells			
Greens	Melissa Stevens			
Family First	Alan Denaro			
One Nation	Michelle McKay			
Liberal National	Kimberley Washington			
Total formal votes				
Informal votes				
Turnout				

==== 2022 ====
2022 Australian federal election: Lilley
Party	Candidate	Votes	%	±%
Labor	Anika Wells	41,424	41.84	+6.20
Liberal National	Vivian Lobo	29,530	29.83	−10.95
Greens	Melissa Stevens	16,916	17.09	+3.08
One Nation	Michelle Wilde	4,027	4.07	−1.28
United Australia	Gerardine Hoogland	3,320	3.35	+1.10
Liberal Democrats	Daniel Freshwater	2,412	2.44	+2.44
Informed Medical Options	Stephen McGrath	1,378	1.39	+1.39
Total formal votes		99,007	97.30	+0.78
Informal votes		2,750	2.70	−0.78
Turnout		101,757	90.61	−1.54
Two-party-preferred result
Labor	Anika Wells	59,941	60.54	+9.90
Liberal National	Vivian Lobo	39,066	39.46	−9.90
Labor hold		Swing	+9.90	

Alluvial diagram for preference flows in the seat of Lilley in the 2022 federal election. indicates at what stage the winning candidate had over 50% of the votes and was declared the winner.

=== Elections in the 2010s ===
==== 2019 ====
2019 Australian federal election: Lilley
Party	Candidate	Votes	%	±%
Liberal National	Brad Carswell	39,392	40.78	+2.08
Labor	Anika Wells	34,434	35.64	−8.12
Greens	John Meyer	13,539	14.01	+2.34
One Nation	Tracey Bell-Henselin	5,165	5.35	+5.35
United Australia	David McClaer	2,177	2.25	+2.25
Conservative National	Don Coles	1,155	1.20	+1.20
Socialist Alliance	Mike Crook	743	0.77	+0.77
Total formal votes		96,605	96.52	−0.55
Informal votes		3,480	3.48	+0.55
Turnout		100,085	92.15	−0.86
Two-party-preferred result
Labor	Anika Wells	48,917	50.64	−5.04
Liberal National	Brad Carswell	47,688	49.36	+5.04
Labor hold		Swing	−5.04	

==== 2016 ====
2016 Australian federal election: Lilley
Party	Candidate	Votes	%	±%
Labor	Wayne Swan	41,819	43.49	+3.28
Liberal National	David Kingston	37,545	39.05	−2.27
Greens	Claire Ogden	11,137	11.58	+3.91
Family First	Sharan Hall	3,451	3.59	+2.15
Liberal Democrats	Simon Holmick	2,202	2.29	+2.29
Total formal votes		96,154	97.08	+1.65
Informal votes		2,896	2.92	−1.65
Turnout		99,050	92.60	−1.65
Two-party-preferred result
Labor	Wayne Swan	53,190	55.32	+4.00
Liberal National	David Kingston	42,964	44.68	−4.00
Labor hold		Swing	+4.00	

==== 2013 ====
2013 Australian federal election: Lilley
Party	Candidate	Votes	%	±%
Liberal National	Rod McGarvie	37,232	41.32	+0.10
Labor	Wayne Swan	36,228	40.21	−0.88
Greens	Nic Forster	6,908	7.67	−4.50
Palmer United	Benedict Figueroa	6,193	6.87	+6.87
Katter's Australian	James Ryan	1,899	2.11	+2.11
Family First	Allan Vincent	1,297	1.44	−1.66
Citizens Electoral Council	Nick Contarino	344	0.38	+0.38
Total formal votes		90,101	95.43	−0.01
Informal votes		4,314	4.57	+0.01
Turnout		94,415	94.26	+0.74
Two-party-preferred result
Labor	Wayne Swan	46,237	51.32	−1.86
Liberal National	Rod McGarvie	43,864	48.68	+1.86
Labor hold		Swing	−1.86	

==== 2010 ====
2010 Australian federal election: Lilley
Party	Candidate	Votes	%	±%
Liberal National	Rod McGarvie	35,835	41.22	+2.39
Labor	Wayne Swan	35,724	41.09	−10.19
Greens	Andrew Jeremijenko	10,579	12.17	+5.81
Family First	Andrew Herschell	2,696	3.10	+1.32
Independent	Douglas Crowhurst	2,111	2.43	+2.43
Total formal votes		86,945	95.44	−1.61
Informal votes		4,153	4.56	+1.61
Turnout		91,098	93.52	−2.33
Two-party-preferred result
Labor	Wayne Swan	46,234	53.18	−4.77
Liberal National	Rod McGarvie	40,711	46.82	+4.77
Labor hold		Swing	−4.77	

=== Elections in the 2000s ===
==== 2007 ====
2007 Australian federal election: Lilley
Party	Candidate	Votes	%	±%
Labor	Wayne Swan	43,058	51.57	+2.58
Liberal	Scott McConnel	31,944	38.26	−2.80
Greens	Simon Kean Hammerson	5,654	6.77	+1.12
Family First	Karen Gray	1,376	1.65	−1.15
Democrats	Jennifer Cluse	1,015	1.22	−0.28
Liberty & Democracy	Aubrey Clark	455	0.54	+0.54
Total formal votes		83,502	97.04	+1.69
Informal votes		2,548	2.96	−1.69
Turnout		86,050	94.81	+0.29
Two-party-preferred result
Labor	Wayne Swan	48,921	58.59	+3.19
Liberal	Scott McConnel	34,581	41.41	−3.19
Labor hold		Swing	+3.19	

==== 2004 ====
2004 Australian federal election: Lilley
Party	Candidate	Votes	%	±%
Labor	Wayne Swan	40,234	48.88	+2.08
Liberal	Alan Boulton	33,902	41.19	+1.13
Greens	Sue Meehan	4,630	5.63	+1.88
Family First	Brad Hill	2,314	2.81	+2.81
Democrats	Dawn Forsyth	1,230	1.49	−4.21
Total formal votes		82,310	95.35	−0.92
Informal votes		4,014	4.65	+0.92
Turnout		86,324	93.69	−3.10
Two-party-preferred result
Labor	Wayne Swan	45,493	55.27	+0.70
Liberal	Alan Boulton	36,817	44.73	−0.70
Labor hold		Swing	+0.70	

==== 2001 ====
2001 Australian federal election: Lilley
Party	Candidate	Votes	%	±%
Labor	Wayne Swan	37,713	47.11	+1.94
Liberal	David Ross	31,855	39.79	+1.51
Democrats	Rod McDonough	4,565	5.70	+0.80
Greens	Sue Meehan	3,011	3.76	+1.50
One Nation	Pierre Bocquee	2,914	3.64	−4.86
Total formal votes		80,058	96.29	−0.95
Informal votes		3,083	3.71	+0.95
Turnout		83,141	95.37	
Two-party-preferred result
Labor	Wayne Swan	43,899	54.83	+1.70
Liberal	David Ross	36,159	45.17	−1.70
Labor hold		Swing	+1.70	

=== Elections in the 1990s ===
==== 1998 ====
1998 Australian federal election: Lilley
Party	Candidate	Votes	%	±%
Labor	Wayne Swan	35,617	45.16	+2.02
Liberal	Elizabeth Grace	30,185	38.28	−7.83
One Nation	Warren Bray	6,702	8.50	+8.50
Democrats	Kirsty Fraser	3,863	4.90	−1.72
Greens	Sue Meehan	1,785	2.26	−0.57
Christian Democrats	Gerard O'Keeffe	711	0.90	+0.90
Total formal votes		78,863	97.24	−0.70
Informal votes		2,239	2.76	+0.70
Turnout		81,102	94.37	−0.19
Two-party-preferred result
Labor	Wayne Swan	41,902	53.13	+3.51
Liberal	Elizabeth Grace	36,961	46.87	−3.51
Labor gain from Liberal		Swing	+3.51	

==== 1996 ====
1996 Australian federal election: Lilley
Party	Candidate	Votes	%	±%
Liberal	Elizabeth Grace	36,053	46.11	+10.15
Labor	Wayne Swan	33,765	43.18	−6.73
Democrats	Michael Hipwood	5,145	6.58	+2.41
Greens	Noel Clothier	2,221	2.84	−0.30
Independent	Daryl Bertwistle	796	1.02	+1.02
Indigenous Peoples	Gloria Beckett	210	0.27	+0.27
Total formal votes		78,190	97.96	+0.45
Informal votes		1,627	2.04	−0.45
Turnout		79,817	94.56	−1.18
Two-party-preferred result
Liberal	Elizabeth Grace	39,564	50.73	+6.91
Labor	Wayne Swan	38,429	49.27	−6.91
Liberal gain from Labor		Swing	+6.91	

==== 1993 ====
1993 Australian federal election: Lilley
Party	Candidate	Votes	%	±%
Labor	Wayne Swan	36,960	49.94	+1.05
Liberal	Bill Leveritt	26,715	36.09	+0.25
Democrats	Caroline Smith	3,044	4.11	−6.90
National	Doug Foggo	2,738	3.70	+0.33
Greens	Michelle Rielly	2,333	3.15	+3.15
Confederate Action	Graham McDonald	844	1.14	+1.14
Independent	Cyril Dennison	549	0.74	+0.74
Independent	Andrew Coates	492	0.66	+0.66
Independent	Frank Andrews	339	0.46	+0.46
Total formal votes		74,014	97.52	−0.36
Informal votes		1,881	2.48	+0.36
Turnout		75,895	95.73	
Two-party-preferred result
Labor	Wayne Swan	41,601	56.22	−0.46
Liberal	Bill Leveritt	32,391	43.78	+0.46
Labor hold		Swing	−0.46	

==== 1990 ====
1990 Australian federal election: Lilley
Party	Candidate	Votes	%	±%
Labor	Elaine Darling	32,453	50.0	−7.3
Liberal	Ronald Nankervis	22,644	34.9	+7.7
Democrats	Elizabeth Rowland	7,023	10.8	+10.8
National	Steve Purtill	2,217	3.4	−12.2
Democratic Socialist	Dave Riley	557	0.9	+0.9
Total formal votes		64,894	97.9	
Informal votes		1,418	2.1	
Turnout		66,312	94.4	
Two-party-preferred result
Labor	Elaine Darling	37,373	57.7	−0.5
Liberal	Ronald Nankervis	27,422	42.3	+0.5
Labor hold		Swing	−0.5	

=== Elections in the 1980s ===
==== 1987 ====
1987 Australian federal election: Lilley
Party	Candidate	Votes	%	±%
Labor	Elaine Darling	36,248	57.3	+2.8
Liberal	John Gates	17,181	27.2	+2.5
National	Andrew Brown	9,842	15.6	−3.9
Total formal votes		63,271	96.6	
Informal votes		2,226	3.4	
Turnout		65,497	91.8	
Two-party-preferred result
Labor	Elaine Darling	36,848	58.2	+2.5
Liberal	John Gates	26,422	41.8	−2.5
Labor hold		Swing	+2.5	

==== 1984 ====
1984 Australian federal election: Lilley
Party	Candidate	Votes	%	±%
Labor	Elaine Darling	33,348	54.5	−2.3
Liberal	Ian Parminter	15,102	24.7	−15.0
National	John Frew	11,958	19.5	+19.5
Independent	Anthony Catip	821	1.3	+0.7
Total formal votes		61,229	95.1	
Informal votes		3,183	4.9	
Turnout		64,412	92.5	
Two-party-preferred result
Labor	Elaine Darling	34,085	55.7	−3.1
Liberal	Ian Parminter	27,127	44.3	+3.1
Labor hold		Swing	−3.1	

==== 1983 ====
1983 Australian federal election: Lilley
Party	Candidate	Votes	%	±%
Labor	Elaine Darling	35,350	57.2	+9.2
Liberal	Jim Anderson	24,249	39.3	−7.9
Democrats	Gael Paul	1,779	2.9	−1.9
Independent	Anthony Catip	375	0.6	+0.6
Total formal votes		61,753	98.9	
Informal votes		687	1.1	
Turnout		62,440	93.9	
Two-party-preferred result
Labor	Elaine Darling		59.2	+8.4
Liberal	Jim Anderson		40.8	−8.4
Labor hold		Swing	+8.4	

==== 1980 ====
1980 Australian federal election: Lilley
Party	Candidate	Votes	%	±%
Labor	Elaine Darling	29,434	48.0	+8.8
Liberal	Kevin Cairns	28,964	47.2	−1.4
Democrats	Joan Hadley	2,920	4.8	−3.6
Total formal votes		61,318	98.4	
Informal votes		977	1.6	
Turnout		62,295	94.0	
Two-party-preferred result
Labor	Elaine Darling	31,126	50.8	+6.8
Liberal	Kevin Cairns	30,192	49.2	−6.8
Labor gain from Liberal		Swing	+6.8	

=== Elections in the 1970s ===
==== 1977 ====
1977 Australian federal election: Lilley
Party	Candidate	Votes	%	±%
Liberal	Kevin Cairns	30,542	48.6	−3.3
Labor	Elaine Darling	24,661	39.2	−2.0
Democrats	Albert Mayne	5,302	8.4	+8.4
Independent	Frank Andrews	1,970	3.1	+3.1
Progress	Gary Sturgess	386	0.6	+0.6
Total formal votes		62,861	98.3	
Informal votes		1,056	1.7	
Turnout		63,917	95.2	
Two-party-preferred result
Liberal	Kevin Cairns		56.0	−1.2
Labor	Elaine Darling		44.0	+1.2
Liberal hold		Swing	−1.2	

==== 1975 ====
1975 Australian federal election: Lilley
Party	Candidate	Votes	%	±%
Liberal	Kevin Cairns	31,018	51.4	+6.5
Labor	Frank Doyle	25,142	41.7	−5.8
National Country	Peter Addison	4,194	6.9	+0.5
Total formal votes		60,354	98.8	
Informal votes		751	1.2	
Turnout		61,105	95.0	
Two-party-preferred result
Liberal	Kevin Cairns		57.7	+6.7
Labor	Frank Doyle		42.3	−6.7
Liberal hold		Swing	+6.7	

==== 1974 ====
1974 Australian federal election: Lilley
Party	Candidate	Votes	%	±%
Labor	Frank Doyle	27,974	47.5	+0.3
Liberal	Kevin Cairns	26,442	44.9	+0.9
Country	Albert Postle	3,786	6.4	+6.4
Australia	James Webb	713	1.2	−1.6
Total formal votes		58,915	98.4	
Informal votes		939	1.6	
Turnout		59,854	93.6	
Two-party-preferred result
Liberal	Kevin Cairns	30,074	51.0	+1.0
Labor	Frank Doyle	28,841	49.0	−1.0
Liberal gain from Labor		Swing	+1.0	

==== 1972 ====
1972 Australian federal election: Lilley
Party	Candidate	Votes	%	±%
Labor	Frank Doyle	25,236	47.2	+0.1
Liberal	Kevin Cairns	23,555	44.0	−0.1
Democratic Labor	James Morrissey	2,970	5.5	−3.2
Australia	David Proud	1,520	2.8	+2.8
Independent	Ralph Williams	234	0.4	+0.4
Total formal votes		53,515	97.7	
Informal votes		1,284	2.3	
Turnout		54,799	95.2	
Two-party-preferred result
Labor	Frank Doyle	26,775	50.0	+1.7
Liberal	Kevin Cairns	26,740	50.0	−1.7
Labor gain from Liberal		Swing	+1.7	

=== Elections in the 1960s ===
==== 1969 ====
1969 Australian federal election: Lilley
Party	Candidate	Votes	%	±%
Labor	Frank Doyle	24,940	47.1	+7.6
Liberal	Kevin Cairns	23,360	44.1	−8.4
Democratic Labor	Andrew Aitken	4,619	8.7	+1.4
Total formal votes		52,919	98.9	
Informal votes		606	1.1	
Turnout		53,525	94.1	
Two-party-preferred result
Liberal	Kevin Cairns	27,348	51.7	−7.0
Labor	Frank Doyle	25,571	48.3	+7.0
Liberal hold		Swing	−7.0	

==== 1966 ====
1966 Australian federal election: Lilley
Party	Candidate	Votes	%	±%
Liberal	Kevin Cairns	24,001	51.7	+6.1
Labor	Frank Melit	18,695	40.3	−5.4
Democratic Labor	Reginald Lincoln	3,402	7.3	−1.4
Independent	Sarah Ross	334	0.7	+0.7
Total formal votes		46,342	98.2	
Informal votes		861	1.8	
Turnout		47,293	95.0	
Two-party-preferred result
Liberal	Kevin Cairns		57.9	+4.4
Labor	Frank Melit		42.1	−4.4
Liberal hold		Swing	+4.4	

==== 1963 ====
1963 Australian federal election: Lilley
Party	Candidate	Votes	%	±%
Labor	Don Cameron	20,548	45.7	−0.9
Liberal	Kevin Cairns	20,503	45.6	+2.3
Democratic Labor	Frank Andrews	3,934	8.7	−1.4
Total formal votes		44,985	97.8	
Informal votes		1,032	2.2	
Turnout		46,017	95.4	
Two-party-preferred result
Liberal	Kevin Cairns	24,083	53.5	+4.8
Labor	Don Cameron	20,902	46.5	−4.8
Liberal gain from Labor		Swing	+4.8	

==== 1961 ====
1961 Australian federal election: Lilley
Party	Candidate	Votes	%	±%
Labor	Don Cameron	20,186	46.6	+12.3
Liberal	Bruce Wight	18,755	43.3	−8.1
Queensland Labor	Frank Andrews	4,361	10.1	−3.5
Total formal votes		43,302	97.0	
Informal votes		1,329	3.0	
Turnout		44,631	94.3	
Two-party-preferred result
Labor	Don Cameron	22,208	51.3	+13.2
Liberal	Bruce Wight	21,094	48.7	−13.2
Labor gain from Liberal		Swing	+13.2	

=== Elections in the 1950s ===
==== 1958 ====
1958 Australian federal election: Lilley
Party	Candidate	Votes	%	±%
Liberal	Bruce Wight	21,272	51.4	−6.7
Labor	Jack Melloy	14,170	34.3	−7.6
Queensland Labor	Walter Barnes	5,606	13.6	+13.6
Australian Nationalist	Mervyn Goldstiver	312	0.8	+0.8
Total formal votes		41,360	96.6	
Informal votes		1,472	3.4	
Turnout		42,832	94.4	
Two-party-preferred result
Liberal	Bruce Wight		61.9	+3.8
Labor	Jack Melloy		38.1	−3.8
Liberal hold		Swing	+3.8	

==== 1955 ====
1955 Australian federal election: Lilley
Party	Candidate	Votes	%	±%
Liberal	Bruce Wight	23,186	58.1	−0.1
Labor	Jack Melloy	16,742	41.9	+0.1
Total formal votes		39,928	97.9	
Informal votes		865	2.1	
Turnout		40,793	93.9	
Liberal hold		Swing	−0.1	

==== 1954 ====
1954 Australian federal election: Lilley
Party	Candidate	Votes	%	±%
Liberal	Bruce Wight	24,777	58.2	+0.4
Labor	Bernard Williams	17,824	41.8	+3.9
Total formal votes		42,601	98.7	
Informal votes		557	1.3	
Turnout		43,158	94.8	
Liberal hold		Swing	−0.7	

==== 1951 ====
1951 Australian federal election: Lilley
Party	Candidate	Votes	%	±%
Liberal	Bruce Wight	22,945	57.8	−1.6
Labor	Jim Hadley	15,055	37.9	−2.7
Independent	Walter Collings	1,681	4.2	+4.2
Total formal votes		39,681	97.9	
Informal votes		865	2.1	
Turnout		40,546	95.2	
Two-party-preferred result
Liberal	Bruce Wight		58.9	−0.5
Labor	Jim Hadley		41.1	+0.5
Liberal hold		Swing	−0.5	

=== Elections in the 1940s ===
==== 1949 ====
1949 Australian federal election: Lilley
Party	Candidate	Votes	%	±%
Liberal	Bruce Wight	22,488	59.4	+15.2
Labor	Jim Hadley	15,368	40.6	−4.2
Total formal votes		37,856	98.1	
Informal votes		727	1.9	
Turnout		38,583	94.1	
Liberal hold		Swing	+9.2	

==== 1946 ====
1946 Australian federal election: Lilley
Party	Candidate	Votes	%	±%
Labor	Jim Hadley	32,780	45.8	+0.1
Liberal	Charles Wilson	31,072	43.4	−2.4
Services	George Mocatta	7,776	10.9	+10.9
Total formal votes		71,628	97.0	
Informal votes		2,216	3.0	
Turnout		73,844	95.9	
Two-party-preferred result
Labor	Jim Hadley	36,350	50.7	+0.4
Liberal	Charles Wilson	35,278	49.3	−0.4
Labor hold		Swing	+0.4	

==== 1943 ====
1943 Australian federal election: Lilley
Party	Candidate	Votes	%	±%
United Australia	William Jolly	30,992	45.8	−12.3
Labor	Jim Hadley	30,882	45.7	+6.8
One Parliament	Hans Beiers	4,555	6.7	+6.7
Independent	James Julin	1,191	1.8	+1.8
Total formal votes		67,620	97.6	
Informal votes		1,653	2.4	
Turnout		69,273	97.8	
Two-party-preferred result
Labor	Jim Hadley	34,051	50.4	+9.9
United Australia	William Jolly	33,569	49.6	−9.9
Labor gain from United Australia		Swing	+9.9	

==== 1940 ====
1940 Australian federal election: Lilley
Party	Candidate	Votes	%	±%
United Australia	William Jolly	35,047	58.1	+1.5
Labor	Gordon Lovell	23,485	38.9	+0.9
Independent	Charles Mitchell	1,800	3.0	+3.0
Total formal votes		60,332	97.7	
Informal votes		1,399	2.3	
Turnout		61,731	95.9	
Two-party-preferred result
United Australia	William Jolly		59.6	−0.7
Labor	Gordon Lovell		40.4	+0.7
United Australia hold		Swing	−0.7	

=== Elections in the 1930s ===
==== 1937 ====
1937 Australian federal election: Lilley
Party	Candidate	Votes	%	±%
United Australia	William Jolly	31,814	56.6	+5.2
Labor	Edmund Taylor	21,386	38.0	−1.9
Social Credit	Harry Cash	3,040	5.4	+5.4
Total formal votes		56,240	97.0	
Informal votes		1,720	3.0	
Turnout		57,960	97.3	
Two-party-preferred result
United Australia	William Jolly		60.3	+4.5
Labor	Edmund Taylor		39.7	−4.5
United Australia hold		Swing	+4.5	

==== 1934 ====
1934 Australian federal election: Lilley
Party	Candidate	Votes	%	±%
United Australia	Sir Donald Cameron	26,105	51.4	−3.4
Labor	Bert Turner	20,232	39.9	+39.9
Ind. Social Credit	Clayton Keir	4,423	8.7	+8.7
Total formal votes		50,760	98.1	
Informal votes		976	1.9	
Turnout		51,736	96.2	
Two-party-preferred result
United Australia	Sir Donald Cameron		55.8	−4.4
Labor	Bert Turner		44.2	+44.2
United Australia hold		Swing	−4.4	

==== 1931 ====
1931 Australian federal election: Lilley
Party	Candidate	Votes	%	±%
United Australia	George Mackay	30,422	53.8	−13.3
Independent Labor	Alexander Costello	18,988	33.6	+33.6
Social Credit	Frank Mason	7,185	12.7	+12.7
Total formal votes		56,595	97.0	
Informal votes		1,769	3.0	
Turnout		58,364	95.6	
Two-party-preferred result
United Australia	George Mackay		60.2	−6.9
Independent Labor	Alexander Costello		39.8	+39.8
United Australia hold		Swing	−6.9	

=== Elections in the 1920s ===
==== 1929 ====
1929 Australian federal election: Lilley
Party	Candidate	Votes	%	±%
Nationalist	George Mackay	34,726	67.1	−32.9
Independent	Frederick O'Keefe	17,010	32.9	+32.9
Total formal votes		51,736	93.2	
Informal votes		3,776	6.8	
Turnout		55,512	96.0	
Nationalist hold		Swing	−32.9	

==== 1928 ====
1928 Australian federal election: Lilley
Party	Candidate	Votes	%	±%
Nationalist	George Mackay	unopposed		
Nationalist hold		Swing		

==== 1925 ====
1925 Australian federal election: Lilley
Party	Candidate	Votes	%	±%
Nationalist	George Mackay	27,966	64.7	−0.5
Labor	John Mattingley	15,228	35.3	+35.3
Total formal votes		43,194	96.8	
Informal votes		1,445	3.2	
Turnout		44,639	93.4	
Nationalist hold		Swing	−0.5	

==== 1922 ====
1922 Australian federal election: Lilley
Party	Candidate	Votes	%	±%
Nationalist	George Mackay	19,842	65.2	+3.2
Independent	Alexander Costello	10,576	34.8	+34.8
Total formal votes		30,418	93.2	
Informal votes		2,218	6.8	
Turnout		32,636	80.2	
Nationalist hold		Swing	+3.2	

=== Elections in the 1910s ===
==== 1919 ====
1919 Australian federal election: Lilley
Party	Candidate	Votes	%	±%
Nationalist	George Mackay	25,473	63.3	+0.6
Labor	Joseph Johnston	14,762	36.7	−0.6
Total formal votes		40,235	97.8	
Informal votes		912	2.2	
Turnout		41,147	84.3	
Nationalist hold		Swing	+0.6	

==== 1917 ====
1917 Australian federal election: Lilley
Party	Candidate	Votes	%	±%
Nationalist	George Mackay	24,844	62.7	+10.4
Labor	Harald Jensen	14,751	37.3	−10.4
Total formal votes		39,595	98.2	
Informal votes		746	1.8	
Turnout		40,341	90.4	
Nationalist hold		Swing	+10.4	

==== 1914 ====
1914 Australian federal election: Lilley
Party	Candidate	Votes	%	±%
Liberal	Jacob Stumm	15,475	52.3	−2.4
Labor	Arthur Lilley	14,102	47.7	+2.4
Total formal votes		29,577	97.7	
Informal votes		705	2.3	
Turnout		30,282	77.6	
Liberal hold		Swing	−2.4	

==== 1913 ====
1913 Australian federal election: Lilley
Party	Candidate	Votes	%	±%
Liberal	Jacob Stumm	15,729	54.7	−0.1
Labor	Arthur Lilley	13,010	45.3	+0.1
Total formal votes		28,739	97.8	
Informal votes		638	2.2	
Turnout		29,377	79.3	
Liberal notional hold		Swing	−0.1	
