= Ha v New South Wales =

1997 High Court of Australia case

- Court: High Court of Australia
- Full case name: Ha & anor v State of New South Wales & Ors
- Decided: 5 August 1997
- Citations: [1997] HCA 34, (1997) 189 CLR 465

Court membership
- Judges sitting: Brennan CJ, Dawson, Toohey, Gaudron, McHugh, Gummow and Kirby JJ

Case opinions
- (4:3) The Court adopted a broad view of an excise in relation to section 90 (per Brennan CJ, McHugh, Gummow and Kirby JJ)

Laws applied
- This case overturned a previous ruling
- Peterswald v Bartley [1904] HCA 21, (1904) 1 CLR 497

Ha v New South Wales is a High Court of Australia case that dealt with section 90 of the Australian Constitution, which prohibits States from levying excise.

== Facts ==
The plaintiffs were charged under the Business Franchise Licences (Tobacco) Act 1987 (NSW) with selling tobacco in New South Wales without a licence. The Act provided for a licence fee, which consisted of a fixed amount, plus an amount calculated by reference to the value of tobacco sold during the 'relevant period'. The 'relevant period' was defined as 'the month commencing 2 months before the commencement of the month in which the licence expires'. The plaintiffs argued that the licence fee imposed by the Act was an excise and hence invalid due to section 90 of the Constitution.

== Decision ==
A slim majority of the Court (Brennan CJ, McHugh, Gummow and Kirby JJ) ruled in favour of the plaintiffs, adopting the broad view of an excise per Matthews v Chicory Marketing Board (Vic). They ruled an excise was a tax on sale, production and manufacture of goods prior to consumption, applying to goods whether produced locally or not. Excises could apply to any step in dealing with the goods. The Court viewed the scheme as purely about revenue raising without a discernible regulatory element, giving it the appearance of a tax. Under this broad view, the 'licence fee' imposed by the state government was in fact an excise, which Australian states are constitutionally barred from imposing.

The Court distinguished the decision from the earlier franchise fee cases (Dennis Hotels Pty Ltd v Victoria, and Dickenson's Arcade Pty Ltd v Tasmania) because the period of backdating (two months instead of six) and the backdating mechanism were sufficiently different.

Ha also featured a strong dissent, with the minority of the Court (Dawson, Toohey and Gaudron JJ) adopting the traditional narrow view of an excise. They rejected the Parton v Milk Board (Vic) excise definition. The minority saw an excise as specifically a tax on the local manufacture or production of goods.

== See also ==
- Section 90 of the Constitution of Australia
- Australian constitutional law
