= Frank Doyle =

Frank Doyle may refer to:

- Frank Doyle (banker) (1863–1948), founded Exchange Bank of California and Doyle Scholarship
- Frank Doyle (writer) (1917–1996), writer for Archie Comics
- Frank Doyle (politician) (1922–1984), Australian politician
- Frank Doyle (MythBusters), explosives expert and former FBI agent, and frequent guest on MythBusters
- Francis J. Doyle III, American chemical engineer, known as Frank
- Frank Doyle (ice hockey) (born 1980), Canadian ice hockey goaltender

== See also ==
- Francis Doyle (disambiguation)
