= Bolton v Madsen =

Judgement of the High Court of Australia

- Court: High Court of Australia
- Decided: 6 June 1963
- Citations: [1963] HCA 16, (1963) 110 CLR 264

Case history
- Appealed from: Magistrates Court (Qld)

Court membership
- Judges sitting: Dixon CJ, Kitto, Taylor, Menzies, Windeyer and Owen JJ

Case opinions
- (6:0) The broad approach and the criterion of liability approach to excise were approved

Bolton v Madsen, is a High Court of Australia case that dealt with section 90 of the Australian Constitution, which prohibits States from levying excise duty.

This case followed Dennis Hotels Pty Ltd v Victoria. It upheld the broad approach to excise, that is, excise duties are taxes on goods at some stage in their production or distribution before they reach consumers. Furthermore, the case supported the criterion of liability approach, that is, a tax must be applied directly to the goods. The judges gave some guidance on the required relationship; the relationship is satisfied "if the tax is calculated by reference to the quantity or value of goods produced or dealt with in the relevant period", as summarised by Mason J in Hematite Petroleum Pty Ltd v Victoria. This approach, of ensuring that the burden is down the line ensures that it is conformant with the original description of excise in Peterswald v Bartley. The mere fact that there was an increase in the price of goods is insufficient.

== See also ==
- Section 90 of the Constitution of Australia
- Australian constitutional law
