= Francis Doyle =

Francis Doyle may refer to:

- Frank Doyle (politician) (Francis Edward Doyle, 1922–1984), Australian politician
- Sir Francis Hastings Doyle, 1st Baronet, British military officer, of the Doyle baronets
- Francis Hastings Doyle (1810–1888), British barrister/administrator/poet
- Francis J. Doyle III, American chemical engineer
- Francis John Doyle, Australian clergyman and bishop

== See also ==
- Frank Doyle (disambiguation)
- Doyle (surname)
