= Vanderstock v Victoria =

Legal case in Australia

- Court: High Court of Australia
- Full case name: Vanderstock & anor v State of Victoria
- Decided: 18 October 2023
- Citation: [2023] HCA 30

Court membership
- Judges sitting: Kiefel CJ, Gageler, Gordon, Edelman, Steward, Gleeson, and Jagot JJ

Case opinions
- Victoria's charge on the use of zero and low emission vehicles imposed a duty of excise as defined by Section 90 of the Constitution, and is therefore invalid.
- Decision by: Kiefel, Gageler, Gleeson
- Concurrence: Jagot
- Dissent: Gordon
- Dissent: Edelman
- Dissent: Steward

Laws applied
- Constitution of Australia, s. 90
- This case overturned a previous ruling
- Dickenson's Arcade Pty Ltd v Tasmania [1974] HCA 9

Vanderstock v Victoria is a High Court of Australia case concerning excise. A charge imposed by the state of Victoria on zero and low emission vehicles (ZLEVs) was ruled invalid on the grounds that it imposed a duty of excise as defined by Section 90 of the Constitution. It overruled Dickenson's Arcade Pty Ltd v Tasmania, and imposed a broad view of an excise as defined by Section 90.

== Facts ==
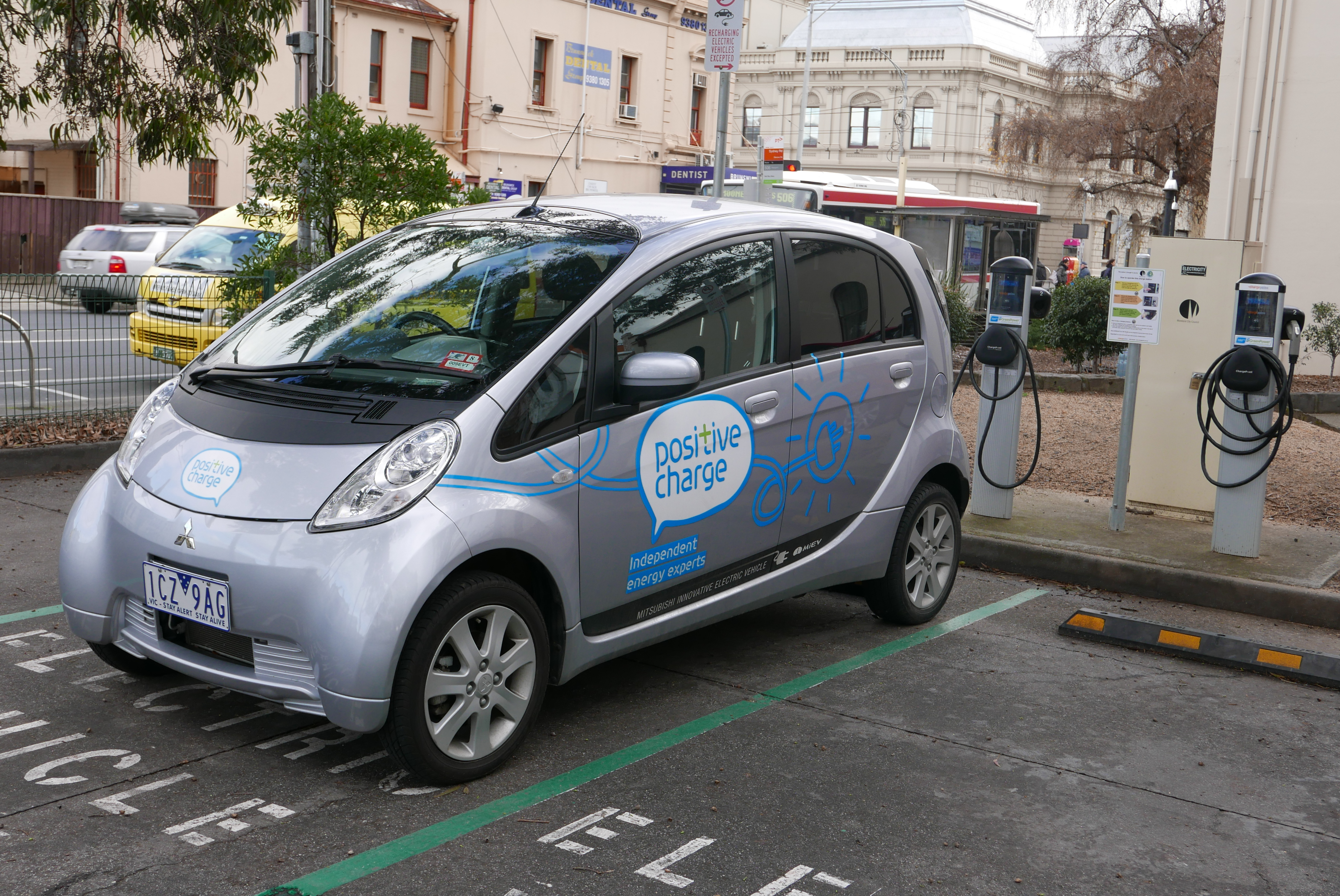
An electric vehicle charging in Brunswick, Victoria.

The Zero and Low Emission Vehicle Distance-based Charge Act 2021, which came into effect on 1 July 2021, imposed a charge on the use of electric, hydrogen, and plug-in hybrid electric vehicles (collectively referred to as ZLEVs) on Victorian roads. The charge was 2.5 cents per kilometre for electric and hydrogen vehicles, and 2.0 cents per kilometre for plug-in hybrid electric vehicles. The charge was introduced to ensure ZLEV owners paid for the maintenance of the road network, as ZLEVs would not be subject to the fuel excise.

In September of 2021, Melbourne ZLEV drivers Chris Vanderstock and Kathleen Davies, represented by Equity Generation Lawyers, launched a challenge against the constitutional validity of the law, arguing that the Victorian law created a tax of consumption on ZLEVs, which would be a duty of excise and exclusive to the Commonwealth under Section 90 of the Constitution.

== Decision ==
A narrow majority of the Court, consisting of Kiefel CJ, and Gageler, Gleeson, and Jagot JJ, ruled in favour of Vanderstock, deciding that the charge on ZLEVs constituted an excise as defined by Section 90 of the Constitution, and was therefore beyond the state of Victoria's constitutional powers. The majority ruled that Dickenson's Arcade Pty Ltd v Tasmania, which held that a tax on goods at the stage of consumption did not constitute an excise, should be reopened and overruled. Kiefel CJ, Gageler, and Gleeson JJ found that the nature of Victoria's ZLEV charge would inherently "dampen demand" for ZLEVs, as the charge applied to almost all uses of ZLEVs on Victorian roads, and therefore the Victorian charge was a tax and a duty of excise.

Jagot J, concurring with the Court's ruling, agreed that the Victorian ZLEV charge was a tax, and thus could not be imposed on the state level, distinguishing it from a "fee for service", such as a license or permit fee.

Gordon, Edelman, and Steward JJ all disagreed with the Court's opinion, authoring separate dissents. Gordon J argued that the majority's ruling "amends the Constitution", by redefining a "duty of excise" in Section 90 to refer to any tax on goods, and argued that the Victorian ZLEV charge, while serving as a tax on the consumption of goods, did not affect the production, manufacture, or commerce of ZLEVs.

Edelman J wrote that the definition of excise that the majority had adopted had no basis in past rulings, serving as a "neglect of precedent". He believed that the Victorian charge was not a consumption tax, and aimed to have the same effect as a fuel excise. However, he stated that the ZLEV charge differed from a fuel excise in that it was not levied at the point of sale. Edelman J argued that the ZLEV charge was "unlikely to have any real and substantial effect" on demand for ZLEVs.

Steward J disagreed with the Court's view that the ZLEV charge was a tax on goods and therefore an excise, writing that the charge had "the character of a direct tax". He argued that, even if it was to be assumed that the ZLEV charge was a consumption tax, such a tax would not fall under the definition of an excise. All three dissenting justices agreed that Dickenson's Arcade should not have been reopened.

== Reaction ==
Plaintiffs Vanderstock and Davies welcomed the Court's ruling, stating that Victoria's ZLEV charge had disincentivised the purchase of ZLEVs and unfairly punished ZLEV drivers. Upon the announcement of the Court's ruling, the Victorian Greens and Victorian shadow treasurer Brad Rowswell called upon the Victorian government to repay charges claimed under the Zero and Low Emission Vehicle Distance-based Charge Act 2021.

The Court's ruling was immediately noted to have severely effected the vertical fiscal imbalance between the Commonwealth and the states. Similar charges planned to be introduced by New South Wales and Western Australia were likely prohibited, and the constitutionality of other state-imposed road user charges, such as motor vehicle duties and vehicle registration charges, could be brought into question. Every state and territory government had submitted in support of Victoria in the case.

Victorian treasurer Tim Pallas argued that the Court had redefined an excise to mean "a tax on anything", suggesting that other state charges could be challenged under the Court's ruling. He emphasised the need to "secure the state’s revenue base" through legislative changes and collaboration with the Commonwealth. New South Wales Premier Chris Minns stated that the decision in Vanderstock had "caught everyone off guard", adding that the funding of future road projects in New South Wales may have to be re-examined due to the state's reliance on road user charges.

Pallas announced in November 2023 that the ZLEV charges imposed would be repaid with interest, amounting to an approximate A$7 million repayment to ZLEV owners.

== See also ==
- Section 90 of the Constitution of Australia
- Australian constitutional law
