= Hematite Petroleum Pty Ltd v Victoria =

- Court: High Court of Australia
- Decided: 5 August 1983
- Citations: [1983] HCA 23, (1983) 151 CLR 599

Court membership
- Judges sitting: Gibbs CJ, Mason, Murphy, Wilson, Brennan and Deane JJ

Case opinions
- (4:2) The pipeline operation fee was an excise Mason, Murphy, Brennan & Deane JJ

Hematite Petroleum Pty Ltd v Victoria is a High Court of Australia case that deals with section 90 of the Australian Constitution.

== Background ==
The plaintiffs were joint venture partners, subsidiaries of BHP and Esso, who used 3 trunk pipelines for the transportation of gas liquids and crude oil, which formed an "integral step in the production of the products sold by the plaintiffs". Prior to 1981 the "pipeline operation fee" under the Pipelines Act 1967 (Vic), was $35 per kilometre, totalling less than $10,000 for each of the three trunk pipelines. As a result of the Pipelines (Fees) Act 1981 (Vic), for the financial year 1981–1982 the tax was increased 100-fold to $10 million for the trunk pipelines. The Plaintiffs sought a declaration that the tax imposed was invalid for being an excise duty contrary to section 90.

== Decision ==
Mason J restated the rejection of the narrow view of excise, but noted that the broad view was tempered by the insistence of the Court that there be a strict relationship between the tax and the goods (the criterion of liability approach), and the problem of defining that relationship. He referred to the formulation in Bolton v Madsen, which "has not emerged unscathed from the more recent decisions on s 90"; for example, there was Barwick CJ's formulation of a variety of factors in Anderson's Pty Ltd v Victoria. His Honour notes that section 90 would do very little to add to the powers of the Commonwealth's economic and financial powers, if the States were allowed to circumvent the prohibition in section 90 through the criterion of liability approach. Since section 90 also allows the Commonwealth parliament to granting bounties on goods, it would make little sense for the States to be given the power to burden such production. Thus, overall, Mason J found that the objective of the power, to secure control over taxation of commodities, suggests the broad approach to excise. As for the required relationship, his Honour prefers the substantial effects doctrine – there need not be a strict arithmetical relationship between the tax and the quantity or value of the goods sold, and it is sufficient that the tax affects the price of the goods sold. A deciding factor in this case is the factual matrix. It appears that the fee is "not merely a fee for the privilege of carrying on an activity"; it is an exaction of such magnitude on a step of the production process, and it is a convenient means of applying such a tax.

Gibbs CJ made the observation that the States now have a severely restricted ability to tax: the restrictions from section 90, and the imposition of uniform income taxes.

== See also ==
- Section 90 of the Constitution of Australia
- Australian constitutional law
