= Postcode: The Splintering of a Nation =

2005 book by Wayne Swan

- Author: Wayne Swan
- Language: English
- Genre: Politics
- Publisher: Pluto Press Australia
- Publication date: 2005
- Publication place: Australia
- Media type: Softcover
- Pages: 248
- ISBN: 1-86403-360-6
- OCLC: 61203382
- Dewey Decimal: 330.994 22
- LC Class: HN850.Z9 S6472 2005

Postcode: The Splintering of a Nation is a book by Australian politician Wayne Swan published in 2005. Swan was the Federal Treasurer from December 2007 to June 2013.

== Reception ==
Swan's concerns were criticised when his government payment reforms were made known to the public. It was alleged, in an article by Jessica Irvine in The Sydney Morning Herald, that restriction of access to family benefits for upper-middle income earners, less than half of whom have any children to provide for, was unjust given the loss of the "baby bonus", worth $5,000 per infant, was not applied in equal measure to those who didn't run a household.

== Reviews ==
Frank Bongiorno noted that the book frames the socialist ideas of "reducing poverty and disadvantage, with education and training to play a key role both in achieving this goal and in lifting the country's economic performance more generally; phasing out private debt and consumption; and creating a more rational interaction between the welfare and tax systems" in a circumspect manner. There was a discernable more nuanced take on the evolution of "disadvantage" than in similar critiques but it then proposes languid (dated) and politicised (apersonal) solutions to such a crisis, thus disengaging the reader, early in the discourse.
