= 2008 Australian federal budget =

Australian federal budget 2008–09
- Submitted: 13 May 2008
- Submitted to: Parliament of Australia
- Country: Australia
- Parliament: 42nd
- Party: Australian Labor Party
- Treasurer: Wayne Swan
- Total revenue: A$312.961 billion
- Total expenditures: A$287.764 billion
- Tax cuts: A$46.7 billion (over 4 years)
- Surplus: A$21.703 billion
- Website: Budget Overview at the Wayback Machine (archived 2008-07-22): Note: Surplus excluded earnings from Future Find
- ^{‡}Numbers in italics are projections.

The 2008 Australian federal budget for the Australian financial year ended 30 June 2009 was presented on 13 May 2008 by the Treasurer of Australia, Wayne Swan, the first federal budget presented by Swan, and the first budget of the first Rudd government.

It had a particular emphasis on family welfare (expansive tax cuts and a lift in the threshold of the Medicare levy surcharge) and capital investment (national accreditation) funds. Swan described it as "a A$55 billion Working Families Support Package" that "strengthens Australia's economic foundations, and delivers for working families under pressure" from increasingly high interest rates.

== Major policies ==
Total spending was cut, following on from gradual cuts of nearly 2% of GDP over the decade of the Howard government. Changes to taxation prompted then Shadow Treasurer Malcolm Turnbull to claim the increased taxation will contribute to inflation, but Swan argued that the tax will affect only high income-earners, dispelling any "custodian" line of attack. Heavy spending by the states had been inefficient at managing past underinvestment on infrastructure, and "the conduct of expansionary monetary policies will be less complicated" as a result of the new reform agenda to avoid (supply-side) case-mix funding of the health care and vocational training sectors of the economy.

A new $3 billion tax increase on alcopop drinks was designed to slow down a projected increase (from the Federal Health Minister, Nicola Roxon, tabling Treasury advice) in alcopop sales by 43 million bottles, curtailing binge drinking. However, the opposition described the increase as merely a revenue raiser, with Shadow Health Minister Joe Hockey arguing that consumers of alcopop will switch to other drinks, such as champagne, and binge drinking will not decrease. In response, the Prime Minister told Federal Parliament that the tax increase had wide support in medical and alcohol support services. Opposition Leader Brendan Nelson counter-offered with a $1.8 billion petrol tax cut, reversing years of policy opposing lowering petrol taxes. The Opposition pledged to block the alcopop tax in the Senate, which it will control until July 2008, and has also pledged to block a move to remove a surcharge tax trap for people who fail to take out health cover, which, it claims, will drive up insurance premiums and steer people away from private healthcare.

An increase to the luxury car tax was defeated in the Senate, with Steve Fielding of Family First joining the coalition in blocking the budget legislation. It had been supported by the government, the Australian Greens, and independent Nick Xenophon. It was later passed by all non-coalition Senators after amendments were made.

== Reception ==
The World Wildlife Fund of Australia has criticised the ambiguity of the Budget's timeline for developing coal pollution mitigation technology, while the Australian Conservation Foundation has urged the government to reconsider taxes that promote the creation of pollution. However, multinational real estate company Jones Lang LaSalle lauded the $90 million Green Building Fund, which subsidies half the cost of fitting office blocks with environmentally friendly design features.

Senior citizens representative group Seniors Australia criticised the budget for not increasing the seniors pension, and Carers Australia expressed dismay over the lack of change for carer payments. A day after the Budget's release, the government promised a future inquiry into carer and pensioner payments and asserted that the pensions will increase after a specialised review.

== See also ==
- Economy of Australia
