= Dickenson's Arcade Pty Ltd v Tasmania =

Judgement of the High Court of Australia

- Court: High Court of Australia
- Decided: 1 April 1974
- Citations: [1974] HCA 9, (1974) 130 CLR 177

Court membership
- Judges sitting: Barwick CJ, McTiernan, Menzies, Gibbs, Stephen and Mason JJ

Case opinions
- (5:1) A licensing scheme with a backdating mechanism is not an excise (per Barwick CJ, Menzies, Gibbs, Stephen & Mason JJ; McTiernan J dissenting)

Laws applied
- Overruled by
- Vanderstock v Victoria [2023] HCA 30

Dickenson's Arcade Pty Ltd v Tasmania, also known as the Tobacco Tax case is a High Court of Australia case that dealt with section 90 of the Australian Constitution.

In this case, the Act in question imposed licences for the sale of tobacco, and the fee was calculated as being 4.5 percent of the retail value of tobacco sold in the 12-month period ending 6 months prior to the licence period. Three judges, namely Gibbs, Menzies and Stephen JJ, applied the criterion of liability approach from Dennis Hotels Pty Ltd v Victoria and held that the fee was not an excise and thus not invalid by section 90. Barwick CJ and Mason J, while disapproving of the criterion of liability approach, felt bound to follow the precedent set by Dennis Hotels, since the facts of that cases were quite similar to those in this case.

The Court, with the exception of McTiernan J, excluded consumption taxes from duties of excise, although such taxes are frequently also a tax on the sale of goods.

In 2023, the High Court overruled Dickenson's Arcade Pty Ltd v Tasmania in the case Vanderstock v Victoria.

== See also ==
- Section 90 of the Constitution of Australia
- Australian constitutional law
