= Matthews v Chicory Marketing Board (Vic) =

Judgement of the High Court of Australia

- Court: High Court of Australia
- Full case name: Matthews v The Chicory Marketing Board (Victoria)
- Decided: 9 August 1938
- Citations: [1938] HCA 38, (1938) 60 CLR 263

Court membership
- Judges sitting: Latham CJ, Rich, Starke, Dixon and McTiernan JJ

Case opinions
- (3:2) The tax on producers of chicory calculated by land area was found to be an excise (per Rich, Starke & Dixon JJ; Latham CJ & McTiernan J dissenting)

Matthews v Chicory Marketing Board (Vic), is a High Court of Australia case that considered section 90 of the Australian Constitution, which prohibits States from levying excise (taxes). Although the meaning of excise was considered in Peterswald v Bartley, this case significantly broadened its reach.

In this case, the law in question was a Victorian tax on producers of chicory, which was measured at the rate of one pound per half-acre, of land planted with the crop. The minority in this case, consisting of Latham CJ and McTiernan J, followed the Peterswald definition and held that an excise must have some relation to the quantity or value of the goods.

On the contrary, the majority, whose principal judgment was delivered by Dixon J, allowed this extension. After examining the history of excise in England, his Honour concluded that the definition in Peterswald may be too narrow. All that is required is that the "tax must bear a close relation to the production or manufacture, the sale or the consumption of goods and must be of such a nature as to affect them as the subjects of manufacture or production or as articles of commerce". Hence, although the tax in this case did not directly refer to the quantity or value of the chicory produced, the land area has a "natural, although not a necessary" relation to the quantity produced, and it is a "controlling element". This was formulated with reference to the framers of the Constitution, who adopted an excise as "a tax directly affecting commodities".

== See also ==
- Section 90 of the Constitution of Australia
- Australian constitutional law
