= Anderson's Pty Ltd v Victoria =

Judgement of the High Court of Australia

- Court: High Court of Australia
- Decided: 17 December 1964
- Citations: [1964] HCA 77, (1964) 111 CLR 353

Court membership
- Judges sitting: Barwick CJ, McTiernan, Kitto, Taylor, Menzies and Windeyer JJ

Anderson's Pty Ltd v Victoria, is a High Court of Australia case that dealt with Section 90 of the Constitution of Australia. In this case, following on from such cases as Dennis Hotels Pty Ltd v Victoria, Barwick CJ accepted the broad approach to the definition of an excise, but rejected the formalistic criterion of liability approach for determining if the excise falls at the relevant step. He adopted the substance over form approach, or the substantial effects doctrine, in that there are many factors to be considered, for example, the indirectness of the tax, its effect on the cost of goods and its proximity to the production or distribution of the goods.

== See also ==
- Section 90 of the Constitution of Australia
- Australian constitutional law
