= Section 90 of the Constitution of Australia =

Section 90 of the Constitution of Australia prohibits the states from imposing customs duties and excise duties. The section bars the states from imposing any tax that would be considered to be of a customs or excise nature. While customs duties are easy to determine, the status of excise, as summarised in Ha v New South Wales, is that it consists of "taxes on the production, manufacture, sale or distribution of goods, whether of foreign or domestic origin." This effectively means that states are unable to impose sales taxes.

Whether a State tax is of an excise nature or not has been the subject of numerous cases in the High Court of Australia, and it has had difficulty in reaching a clear majority opinion as to how "excise" should be interpreted in specific circumstances. It has been described as "one of the significant failures of the High Court."

== Text ==
On the imposition of uniform duties of customs the power of the Parliament to impose duties of customs and of excise, and to grant bounties on the production or export of goods, shall become exclusive. On the imposition of uniform duties of customs all laws of the several states imposing duties of customs or of excise, or offering bounties on the production or export of goods, shall cease to have effect, but any grant of or agreement for any such bounty lawfully made by or under the authority of the Government of any State shall be taken to be good if made before the thirtieth day of June, One thousand eight hundred and ninety eight, and not otherwise.

== Scope ==
Starting with Peterswald v Bartley (1904), it was initially held that "excise" is an indirect tax, and is accordingly based on the definition given by John Stuart Mill:

Taxes are either direct or indirect. A direct tax is one which is demanded from the very persons who it is intended or desired should pay it. Indirect taxes are those which are demanded from one person in the expectation and intention that he shall indemnify himself at the expense of another; such are the excise or customs.

However, since Dennis Hotels Pty Ltd v Victoria, it has been held that indirectness is neither a necessary nor sufficient quality for such a tax.

Since the High Court's ruling in Parton v Milk Board, subsequently endorsed unanimously in Bolton v Madsen, excise duties in the Australian context are generally agreed to apply in several situations:

- "What probably is essential is that it should be a tax upon goods before they reach the consumer."
- "A tax upon a commodity at any point in the course of distribution before it reaches the consumer produces the same effect as a tax upon its manufacture or production."
- "It is probably a safe inference ... that a tax on consumers or upon consumption cannot be an excise."

In Hematite Petroleum Pty Ltd v Victoria, it was further held:

...the tax must be directly related to the goods and the criterion of liability must be a step in the production, manufacture, sale or distribution of the goods. There is a direct relationship between the tax and the goods if the tax is calculated by reference to the quantity or value of goods produced or dealt with in the relevant period. Conversely, it was said that to establish no more than that the imposition of the tax increased the cost of putting goods on the market by a calculable amount, e.g., because the tax was imposed in a fixed amount as the fee for a licence, falls short of establishing the requisite relationship between the tax and the goods.

In Gosford Meats Pty Ltd v New South Wales, Gibbs CJ summarised the position by stating that "an impost cannot be an excise unless it is a tax upon, or in respect of, a step in the production, manufacture, sale or distribution of goods."

While the reasoning of these cases appears straightforward, the application has not. The High Court held in a series of cases that license and franchise fees did not constitute "excise", such as:

1. a levy of six per cent of the wholesale value of liquor on liquor retailers (Dennis Hotels);
2. a license fee scheme for the sale of petrol (HC Sleigh);
3. a licence fee calculated using a back-dating device (i.e., by reference to results of a preceding period) (Parton); and
4. a tobacco licensing scheme (Dickenson's Arcade, Philip Morris).

However, other taxes have been held to be "excise":

1. a levy which fell equally upon local and imported petrol (Petrol Case);
2. a consumption tax on tobacco (Dickenson's Arcade);
3. taxing receipts issued by vendors that acknowledged payment of the purchase price of commodities (Hamersley);
4. a tax on the processing of fish intended for human consumption (MG Kailis);
5. a tax on livestock used in the production of meat or wool (Logan Downs);
6. a pipeline charge held to be an excise on petrol (Hematite);
7. a meat industry licence (Gosford Meats); and
8. an X-rated video licensing scheme (Capital Duplicators).

But Ha v New South Wales has since cast doubt on State licensing schemes previously held to be valid for tobacco, alcohol and petrol, and which have accounted for a significant portion of State revenues. Ha held that where such a scheme is not in reality of a regulatory nature, it is therefore invalid:

So long as a State tax, albeit calculated on the value or quantity of goods sold, was properly to be characterised as a mere licence fee this Court upheld the legislative power of the states to impose it. But once a State tax imposed on the seller of goods and calculated on the value or quantity of goods sold cannot be characterised as a mere licence fee, the application of s 90 must result in a declaration of its invalidity.

This has created significant debate as to the validity of other State taxation schemes, such as in the recent trend for states to extend stamp duty to certain dealings in goods.

In 2023, in the case of Vanderstock v Victoria the court ruled that a tax per kilometres driven for electric vehicles was an excise and therefore invalid. In a 4:3 decision, the court overturned Dickenson’s Arcade Pty Ltd v Tasmania and ruled that consumption charges are a form of duty excise. The minority justices were scathing in their dissent, with Steward J arguing the decision could "render the states and territories the constitutionally fiscal minions of the commonwealth".

== Significant cases ==
- Peterswald v Bartley [1904] HCA 21, (1904) 1 CLR 497 (31 August 1904)
- Commonwealth v South Australia ("Petrol Case") [1926] HCA 47, (1926) 38 CLR 408 (25 November 1926)
- Matthews v Chicory Marketing Board [1938] HCA 38, (1938) 60 CLR 263 (9 August 1938)
- Parton v Milk Board [1949] HCA 67, (1949) 80 CLR 229 (21 December 1949)
- Dennis Hotels Pty Ltd v Victoria ("Liquor Licence case") [1960] HCA 10, (1960) 104 CLR 529 (26 February 1960)
- Bolton v Madsen [1963] HCA 16, (1963) 110 CLR 264 (6 June 1963)
- Anderson's Pty Ltd v Victoria [1964] HCA 77, (1964) 111 CLR 353 (17 December 1964)
- Dickenson's Arcade Pty Ltd v Tasmania ("Tobacco Tax case") [1974] HCA 9, (1974) 130 CLR 177 (1 April 1974)
- Hematite Petroleum Pty Ltd v Victoria ("Pipelines case") [1983] HCA 23, (1983) 151 CLR 599 (5 August 1983)
- Gosford Meats Pty Ltd v New South Wales [1985] HCA 5, (1985) 155 CLR 368 (13 February 1985)
- Philip Morris Ltd v Commissioner of Business Franchises [1989] HCA 38, (1989) 167 CLR 399 (24 August 1989)
- Capital Duplicators Pty Ltd v Australian Capital Territory [1992] HCA 51, (1992) 177 CLR 248 (15 October 1992)
- Ha v New South Wales [1997] HCA 34, (1997) 189 CLR 465 (5 August 1997)
- Vanderstock v Victoria [2023] HCA 30 (18 October 2023)
