= Bruce Wight =

Australian politician

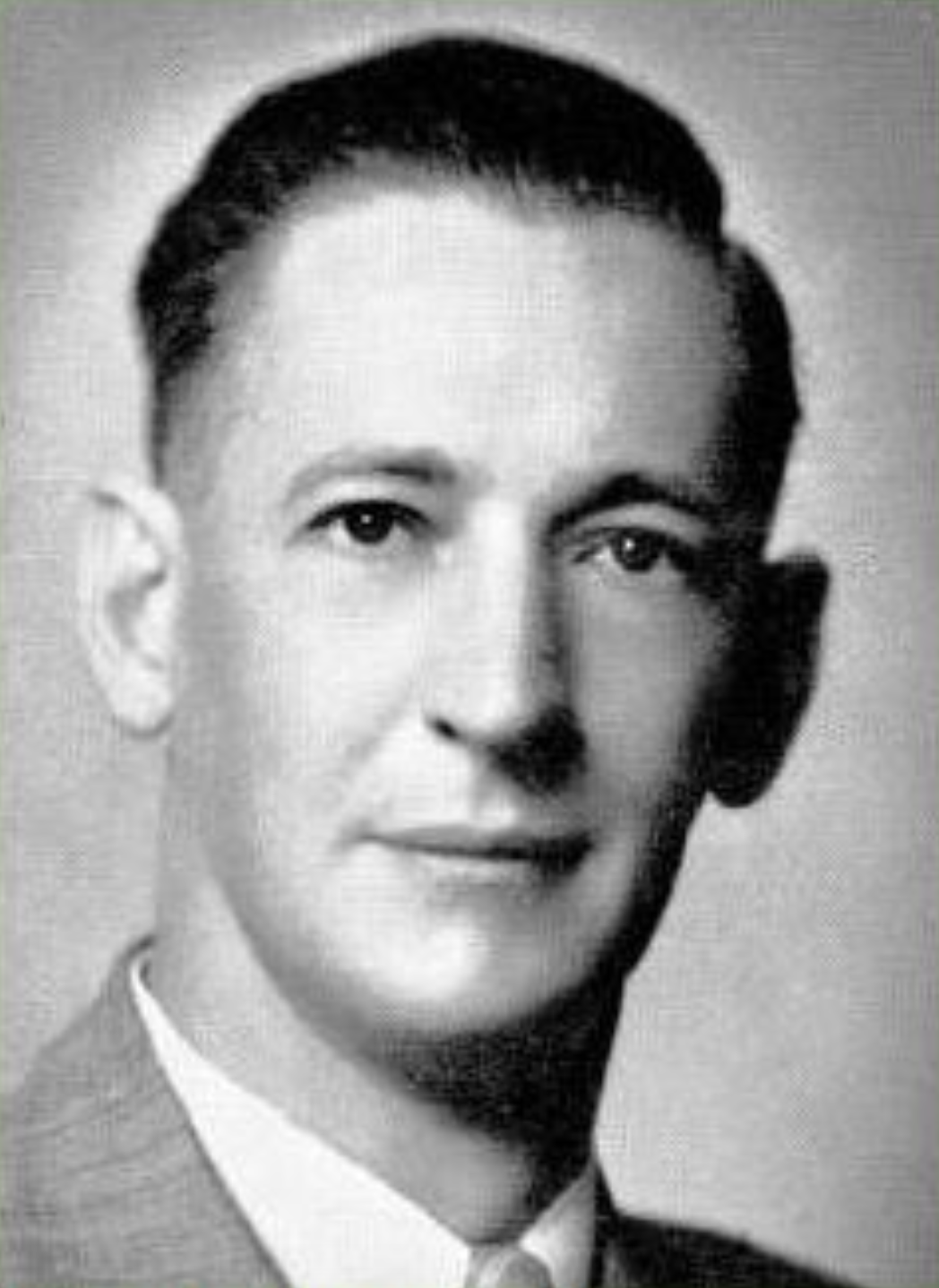

Member of the Australian Parliament for Lilley
- In office 10 December 1949 – 9 December 1961
- Preceded by: Jim Hadley
- Succeeded by: Don Cameron

Personal details
- Born: 16 June 1914 Mudgee, New South Wales, Australia
- Died: 2 February 1969 (aged 54)
- Party: Liberal

Military service
- Allegiance: Australia
- Branch/service: Australian Army
- Years of service: 1940–1944
- Rank: Sergeant
- Unit: Second AIF
- Commands: 2/17th Infantry Battalion
- Battles/wars: World War II

Bruce McDonald Wight (16 June 1914 – 2 February 1969) was an Australian politician. Born in Mudgee, New South Wales, he was educated at Sydney Boys High School, graduating in 1929 before becoming a business manager in Brisbane, having moved to Queensland. He served in the military 1937–1946. In 1949, he was elected to the Australian House of Representatives as the Liberal member for Lilley, defeating Labor member Jim Hadley. He held the seat until 1961, when he was defeated by Labor's Don Cameron. He became a business executive after leaving politics. Wight died in 1969.

Parliament of Australia
Preceded by Jim Hadley	Member for Lilley; 1949 – 1961	Succeeded by Don Cameron
