= Don Cameron (Queensland Labor politician) =

Australian politician

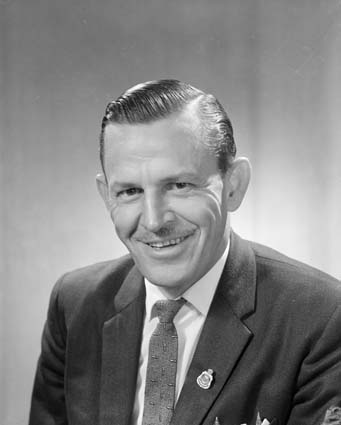

Member of the Australian Parliament for Lilley
- In office 9 December 1961 – 30 November 1963
- Preceded by: Bruce Wight
- Succeeded by: Kevin Cairns

Personal details
- Born: 15 October 1917 Cloncurry, Queensland
- Died: 22 June 1964 (aged 46)
- Party: Australian Labor Party
- Occupation: Chef

Donald James Cameron (15 October 1917 – 22 June 1964) was an Australian politician. He was a member of the Australian Labor Party (ALP) and served in the House of Representatives from 1961 to 1963, representing the Queensland seat of Lilley.

== Early life ==
Cameron was born on 15 October 1917 in Cloncurry, Queensland. He was a hotel chef before his election to parliament.

== Federal politics ==
Cameron was elected to the House of Representatives at the 1961 federal election, winning the seat of Lilley for the Australian Labor Party (ALP) from the incumbent Liberal MP Bruce Wight. He was defeated after a single term by new Liberal candidate Kevin Cairns.

In May 1963, Cameron suffered a heart attack while flying from Brisbane to Sydney. According to condolence motions in parliament after his death, he suffered from chronic heart disease which inhibited his campaigning at the 1963 election.

== Personal life ==
Cameron died on 22 June 1964, aged 46. He was survived by his wife and four children. He was buried in Nudgee Cemetery.

Parliament of Australia
Preceded by Bruce Wight	Member for Lilley; 1961–1963	Succeeded by Kevin Cairns
