= Parton v Milk Board (Vic) =

Judgement of the High Court of Australia

- Court: High Court of Australia
- Decided: 21 December 1949
- Citations: [1949] HCA 67, (1949) 80 CLR 229

Court membership
- Judges sitting: Latham CJ, Rich, Dixon, McTiernan and Williams JJ

Case opinions
- (3:2) The broad approach to excise in section 90 is to be taken (per Rich, Dixon & Williams JJ; Latham CJ & McTiernan J dissenting)

Parton v Milk Board (Vic), is a High Court of Australia case that dealt with the meaning of excise in relation to section 90 of the Australian Constitution.

In this case, the tax was calculated as a fixed amount per gallon of milk, and imposed on retailers, instead of at the production phase; this was held to be invalid as imposing a duty of excise. This heralded in the broad approach to section 92 - where a "tax upon a commodity at any point in the course of distribution before it reaches the consumer produces the same effect as a tax upon its manufacture or production" (per Dixon J). Rich and Williams JJ agreed with Dixon J, stating that a tax at a later stage in the handling of a good is in effect a tax on the production or manufacture of the good.

Latham CJ dissented, using Peterswald v Bartley, and McTiernan J felt that it should be employed in a narrower sense, to make it fit within what he perceived to be the object of the section, which was to promote a "uniform fiscal policy for the Commonwealth".

== See also ==
- Section 90 of the Constitution of Australia
- Australian constitutional law
