= Fuel taxes in Australia =

Taxing modality in Australia

The main fuel tax in Australia is an excise tax, to which goods and services tax (GST) is added. Both taxes are levied by the federal government. In Australia the GST (currently 10%) is applied on top of the fuel excise tax. In some cases, businesses may be entitled to exemptions or rebates for fuel excise tax, including tax credits and certain excise-free fuel sources.

The "double dipping" (GST imposed on the excise tax) was fully compensated for by lowering the excise at the time the GST was introduced in 2001. While the excise stopped being indexed for inflation in 2001, indexation was reintroduced in 2014.

The tax collected is added to general revenue. From 1 April 2022 to 1 October 2022, the fuel excise was lowered or cut by 50% by the federal budget 2022 to 22.1c per litre for all fuels.

== Excise tax rates ==
The excise tax on commonly used fuels in Australia as of 2 February 2026:

- $0.526 per litre (reduced to $0.206 per litre between April and June 2026) on unleaded petrol fuel (including standard, blended (E10) and premium grades)
- $0.526 per litre (reduced to $0.206 per litre between April and June 2026) on diesel fuel (ultra-low sulphur/conventional)
- $0.172 per litre (reduced to $0.067 per litre between April and June 2026) on liquified petroleum gas used as fuel (autogas or LPG as it is commonly known in Australia).
- $0.172 per litre (reduced to $0.068 per litre between April and June 2026) on ethanol fuel for use as fuel in an internal combustion engine (which can be reduced/removed with grants)
- $0.175 per litre (reduced to $0.69 per litre between April and June 2026) on biodiesel (which can be reduced/removed with grants)

Petrol and kerosene for use as fuel in an aircraft is taxed at $0.03556 per litre.

In addition all fuels are subject to 10% GST.

The federal government increased the fuel excise tax with effect from 10 November 2014 by restoring CPI indexation to the tax every six months, on 1 February and 1 August. From that date the fuel excise tax increased to 38.6 cents per litre.

There are also a number of various grants and incentive schemes involving tax credits and rebates that generally apply to businesses or industries that rely heavily on the use of fuels, such as transport and aviation. There are also rebates that encourage the production and importation of clean fuels.

== History ==
The Commonwealth introduced a twice yearly indexation for consumer price index of fuel excise taxes in 1983. In 2001, the Howard government adjusted the excise rates because of the introduction of the GST and stopped the automatic indexation of the fuel excise tax.

The second phase of the Australian Fuel Tax Credits Scheme came into effect on 1 July 2008. Under these changes, all off-road business use of fuel became eligible for subsidies. The changes benefited businesses that do not run large vehicle fleets but consume large amounts of fuel in business processes (such as mining, manufacturing, construction, plant operations) became eligible for a fuel tax credit.

The indexation of the fuel excise tax was reintroduced by the Abbott government from 10 November 2014, with indexation being effected twice a year, on 1 February and 1 August.

=== State fuel taxes ===
States no longer apply any fuel taxes. Several states used to levy fuel franchise fees until 1997, when the High Court of Australia ruled in Ha v New South Wales that a licence fee based on the value of tobacco was unconstitutional, as it was an excise tax that only the Commonwealth can levy. The ruling brought into doubt the revenues of the states, and the states removed their fuel taxes. In consequence, the federal government introduced a fuel excise tax and gave the revenue to the states.

Queensland used to provide an 8.354c/L subsidy on most fuels sold in the state, including on unleaded, blended unleaded, LPG and ethanol. The subsidy reflected the lower franchise fee Queensland charged compared to other states prior to 1997. This was usually reflected by an 8.354c/L price difference at the pump, as the subsidy was paid directly to retailers. The subsidy was removed from 1 July 2009.

== See also ==
- Taxation in Australia
