= Elizabeth Grace =

Australian politician

Elizabeth Grace OAM

Member of the Australian Parliament for Lilley
- In office 2 March 1996 – 3 October 1998
- Preceded by: Wayne Swan
- Succeeded by: Wayne Swan

Personal details
- Born: 27 May 1940 (age 85) Ballarat, Victoria
- Party: Liberal Party of Australia

Elizabeth Jane Grace (born 27 May 1940) is an Australian politician. She was a Liberal Party of Australia member of the Australian House of Representatives from 1996 to 1998, representing the Brisbane-based electorate of Lilley.

== Early life ==
Grace was born in Ballarat, Victoria, and was educated at the North Brisbane College of Advanced Education (diploma of teaching) and Trinity College London (associate diploma of speech and drama). She was a primary school teacher from 1967 to 1974 and from 1977 to 1986 and was an information clerk with the Queensland Government Travel Centre from 1989 to 1991. She was then unemployed for several years, and later said that her life "changed dramatically when she was retrenched" in her fifties. She was the secretary of the Liberal Party's Nundah branch in 1994.

== Parliament ==
Grace was elected to the House of Representatives at the 1996 federal election, defeating Labor MP Wayne Swan amidst the national Liberal victory in an electorate campaign centred on unemployment. She served on the House standing committees on family and community affairs and legal and constitutional affairs from 1996 to 1998. She voted for the Andrews bill to overturn the Northern Territory's voluntary euthanasia laws in December 1996. She served as treasurer of the party's conservative Lyons Forum faction. In December 1997, she closed her office for a month to "give [staff] a break from the calls and the public walking in", reopening the office earlier than planned in January after receiving political backlash. Throughout 1998, she faced recurring issues surrounding a potential parallel runway at Brisbane Airport, which would affect airport noise in her electorate. Grace lobbied for the release of the future flight plans but did not otherwise take a stance beyond stating that she would like flights to come in over Moreton Bay, and the proposal was stalled by a ministerial decision in August 1998 - which was attacked by critics as an attempt to defer the issue until after the election.

Swan was widely tipped to win back the seat throughout the 1998 election campaign, in which jobs, the goods and services tax and a controversial government nursing home policy affecting the disproportionately elderly electorate loomed as major issues. Grace refused to debate Swan during the campaign, and he ultimately defeated her with a 3.5% swing in his favour. She refused to concede defeat until the result was formally declared, having reportedly believed she would win and being "shocked" by her defeat though colleagues had long believed it was inevitable; she stated that she "was at a loss" to explain it, though she blamed voters' fears around the goods and services tax.

== Later activities ==
In January 1999, Grace moved to Maryborough to work as a special liaison officer for National Party MP Warren Truss. She later returned to Brisbane and served in a number of voluntary positions, including president of the Rotary Club of Nundah and the Brisbane North Committee on the Ageing and vice-president of the Northgate/Spring Hill and Districts Ambulance Committee

In 2008, she was one of a number of Liberal Party members who refused to join the new merged Liberal National Party of Queensland, stating that it "[amounted] to a Nationals takeover of the Liberal Party" and that she and her husband would have "nothing to do with it".

Parliament of Australia
Preceded by Wayne Swan	Member for Lilley; 1996-1998	Succeeded by Wayne Swan
