= Elaine Darling =

Australian politician (1936–2019)

Member of the Australian Parliament for Lilley
- In office 18 October 1980 – 8 February 1993
- Preceded by: Kevin Cairns
- Succeeded by: Wayne Swan

Personal details
- Born: Elaine Elizabeth Melloy; 6 June 1936 Brisbane, Queensland
- Died: 30 August 2019 (aged 83) Sunshine Coast, Queensland
- Party: Australian Labor Party
- Spouse: Robert Darling
- Children: Mark Darling Russell Darling Vicky Darling
- Occupation: Teacher

Elaine Elizabeth Darling (née Melloy; 6 June 1936 – 30 August 2019) was an Australian politician. The Labor member for Lilley from 1980 to 1993, she was the first woman from Queensland to be elected to the House of Representatives.

== Early life ==
Born in Brisbane, Darling attended the University of Queensland before becoming a teacher, eventually rising to be an assistant to the director of the Brisbane Kindergarten Training College.

== Politics ==
In 1980, Darling was elected to the Australian House of Representatives as the Labor Party member for Lilley, defeating the sitting Liberal Party MP Kevin Cairns. She was the fifth woman elected to the House of Representatives, and the second female Labor member of that house (the first was Joan Child). She held Lilley until her retirement in 1993.

From 2000 to 2004, she was a council member of the City of Caloundra.

== Family political connections ==
Darling's father, Jack Melloy, was a long serving member of the Australian Labor Party and member of the Legislative Assembly of Queensland. Her daughter, Vicky Darling, was a member of the Legislative Assembly of Queensland from 2006 to 2012.

Parliament of Australia
Preceded by Kevin Cairns	Member for Lilley; 1980–1993	Succeeded by Wayne Swan
