= Kevin Cairns (politician) =

Australian politician (1929–1984)

The Honourable Kevin Cairns
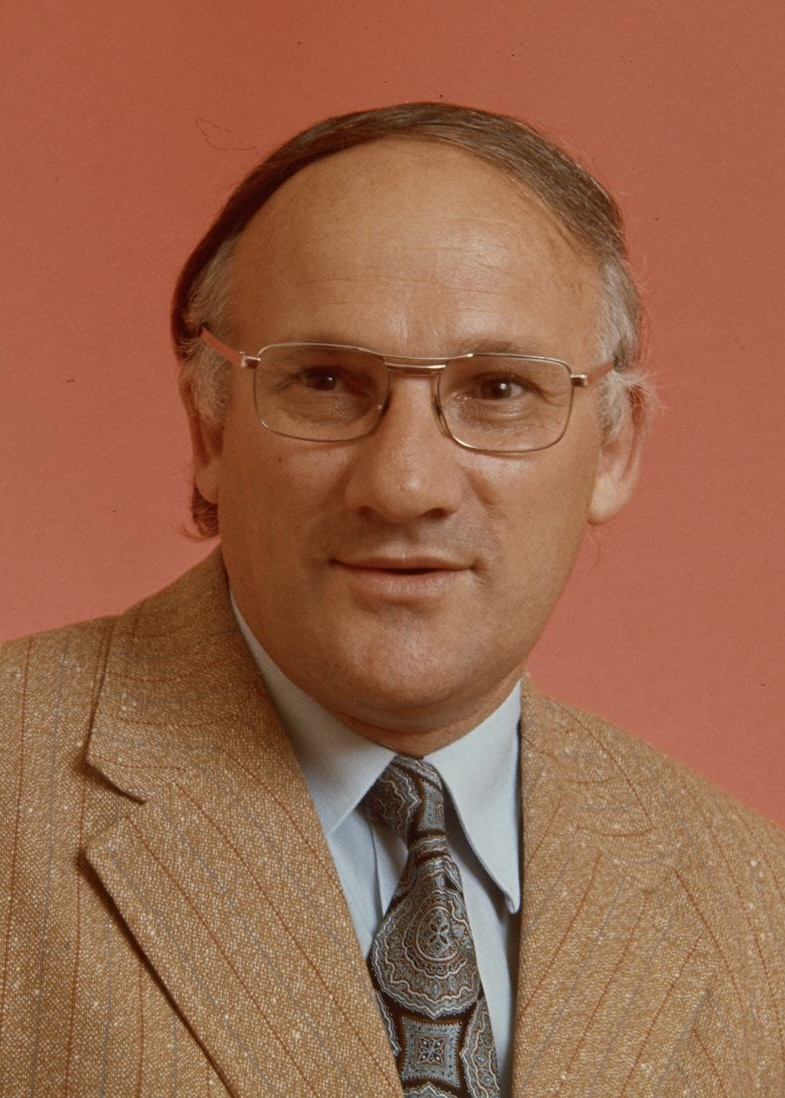
- Cairns in 1974

Minister for Housing
- In office 22 March 1971 – 5 December 1972
- Prime Minister: William McMahon
- Preceded by: Annabelle Rankin
- Succeeded by: Gough Whitlam

Member of the Australian Parliament for Lilley
- In office 30 November 1963 – 2 December 1972
- Preceded by: Don Cameron
- Succeeded by: Frank Doyle
- In office 18 May 1974 – 18 October 1980
- Preceded by: Frank Doyle
- Succeeded by: Elaine Darling

Personal details
- Born: Kevin Michael Kiernan Cairns; 15 May 1929 Five Dock, Sydney, Australia
- Died: 6 July 1984 (aged 55) Clayfield, Brisbane, Australia
- Party: Liberal
- Spouse: Tonia
- Relations: Clare Martin (niece)
- Education: University of Sydney
- Occupation: Dentist

Kevin Michael Kiernan Cairns (15 May 1929 – 6 July 1984) was an Australian dentist and politician. He was a member of the Liberal Party and served as Minister for Housing in the McMahon government from 1971 to 1972. He served in the House of Representatives for 15 years, representing the Queensland seat of Lilley from 1963 to 1972 and 1974 to 1980.

== Early life ==
Cairns was born on 15 May 1929 in Five Dock, New South Wales, the son of Mary Downey (née Jarvis) and Michael Cairns. His father, born in England, was a seaman and union official.

Cairns attended Christian Brothers' High School, Lewisham, and St Joseph's College, Hunters Hill. He won a bursary to study dentistry at the University of Sydney, graduating Bachelor of Dental Science in 1953. He subsequently practised as a dentist for periods in Sydney, Melbourne, and Broken Hill, before settling in Brisbane in 1955 where he established a dental practice in Stones Corner.

== Politics ==
A member of the Liberal Party, Cairns made three unsuccessful bids for the Division of Brisbane in Queensland before finally being elected to the House of Representatives for the nearby seat of Lilley. He was Minister for Housing in the junior ministry of William McMahon from 22 March 1971 to the defeat of the McMahon government at the 1972 election, when he lost his own seat by 35 votes. He won Lilley back at the 1974 election, but was again defeated at the 1980 election.

== Later life ==
Cairns worked as an economic consultant for the Queensland Tourist and Travel Corporation and Mount Isa Mines. He was a member of the Independent Air Fares Committee under the Fraser and the Hawke governments, when the federal government regulated airfares on interstate routes. He eventually became President of the Queensland Economic Society.

== Personal life ==
Cairns died of a heart attack in 1984 and following a state funeral was buried in Nudgee Cemetery. He was survived by his wife, Tonia and their four sons and three daughters.

Cairns was the uncle of Clare Martin, a Labor Party politician who was Chief Minister of the Northern Territory from 2001 to 2007.

Political offices
Preceded by Dame Annabelle Rankin	Minister for Housing; 1971–1972	Succeeded by Gough Whitlam
Parliament of Australia
Preceded by Don Cameron	Member for Lilley; 1963–1972	Succeeded by Frank Doyle
Preceded by Frank Doyle	Member for Lilley; 1974–1980	Succeeded by Elaine Darling
