= Division of Lilley =

Australian federal electoral division

Coordinates: 27.377°S 153.071°E

Lilley Australian House of Representatives Division
- Interactive map of boundaries since the 2019 federal election
- Created: 1913
- MP: Anika Wells
- Party: Labor
- Namesake: Sir Charles Lilley
- Electors: 118,639 (2025)
- Area: 144 km^{2} (55.6 sq mi)
- Demographic: Inner metropolitan

The Division of Lilley is an Australian Electoral Division in Queensland. The current MP is Anika Wells of the Australian Labor Party (ALP).

== History ==
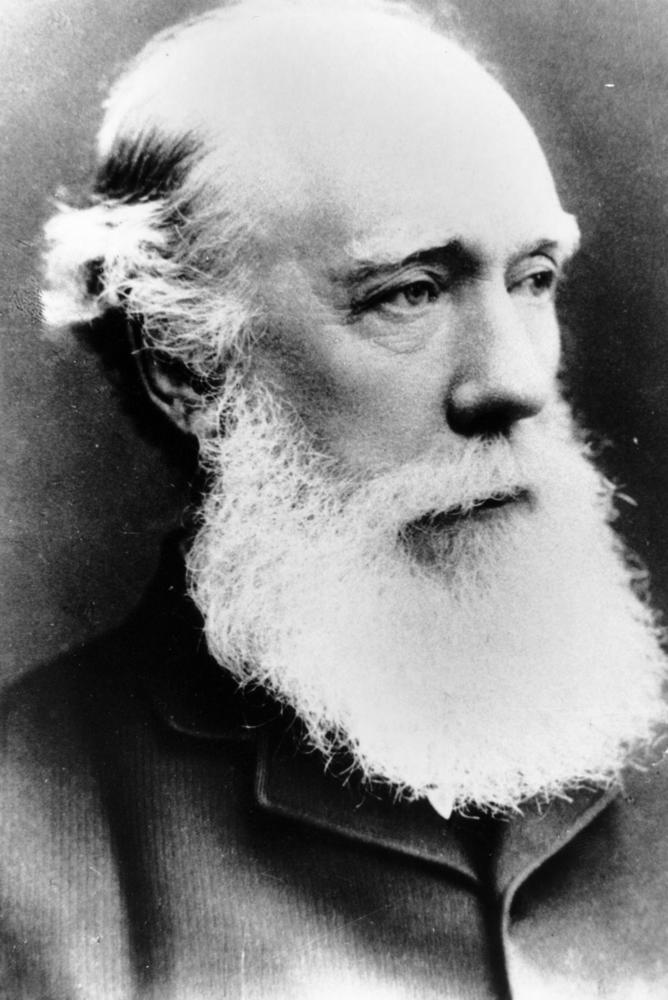
Sir Charles Lilley, the division's namesake

The division was first proclaimed in 1913. The division is named after Sir Charles Lilley, a former premier of Queensland and a former chief justice in the Supreme Court of Queensland.

The Division of Lilley includes sparsely populated areas of Brisbane Airport, tidal wetlands around Boondall, and industrial areas around Pinkenba.

It was held by the Liberal Party and its antecedents for all but four terms from 1913 to 1980. However, since 1980, it has tended to be a marginal Labor seat. It is currently represented by Labor MP Anika Wells. Notable former members include former treasurer, former deputy leader of the Labor Party and deputy prime minister, Wayne Swan, as well as George Mackay, who served as Speaker of the Australian House of Representatives during the first term of the Lyons Government, and Kevin Cairns, a minister in the McMahon government.

== Boundaries ==
Since 1984, federal electoral division boundaries in Australia have been determined at redistributions by a redistribution committee appointed by the Australian Electoral Commission. Redistributions occur for the boundaries of divisions in a particular state, and they occur every seven years, or sooner if a state's representation entitlement changes or when divisions of a state are malapportioned.

Lilley stretches from Nundah in the south to the bayside suburbs of Sandgate and Brighton in the north, and as far west as Everton Park.

Lilley currently covers the north-eastern part of the City of Brisbane local government area, and includes Banyo, Boondall, Brighton, Chermside, Deagon, Geebung, Kedron, Northgate, Nudgee, Nundah, Pinkenba, Sandgate, Shorncliffe, Taigum, Virginia, Wavell Heights, Zillmere, and Aspley.

== Members ==
Image	Member	Party	Term	Notes
	Jacob Stumm (1853–1921)	Liberal	31 May 1913 – 17 February 1917	Previously held the Legislative Assembly of Queensland seat of Gympie. Retired
	Jacob Stumm (1853–1921)	Nationalist	17 February 1917 – 26 March 1917	Previously held the Legislative Assembly of Queensland seat of Gympie. Retired
	George Mackay (1872–1961)	Nationalist	5 May 1917 – 7 May 1931	Previously held the Legislative Assembly of Queensland seat of Gympie. Served as Speaker during the Lyons Government. Retired
	George Mackay (1872–1961)	United Australia	7 May 1931 – 7 August 1934	Previously held the Legislative Assembly of Queensland seat of Gympie. Served as Speaker during the Lyons Government. Retired
	Sir Donald Cameron (1879–1960)	United Australia	15 September 1934 – 21 September 1937	Previously held the Division of Brisbane. Resigned to contest the Senate and was defeated
	William Jolly (1881–1955)	United Australia	23 October 1937 – 21 August 1943	Lost seat
	Jim Hadley (1893–1971)	Labor	21 August 1943 – 10 December 1949	Lost seat. Later elected to the Legislative Assembly of Queensland seat of Nundah in 1956
	Bruce Wight (1914–1969)	Liberal	10 December 1949 – 9 December 1961	Lost seat
	Don Cameron (1917–1964)	Labor	9 December 1961 – 30 November 1963	Lost seat
	Kevin Cairns (1929–1984)	Liberal	30 November 1963 – 2 December 1972	Served as minister under McMahon. Lost seat
	Frank Doyle (1922–1984)	Labor	2 December 1972 – 18 May 1974	Lost seat
	Kevin Cairns (1929–1984)	Liberal	18 May 1974 – 18 October 1980	Lost seat
	Elaine Darling (1936–2019)	Labor	18 October 1980 – 8 February 1993	Retired
	Wayne Swan (1954–)	Labor	13 March 1993 – 2 March 1996	Lost seat
	Elizabeth Grace (1940–)	Liberal	2 March 1996 – 3 October 1998	Lost seat
	Wayne Swan (1954–)	Labor	3 October 1998 – 11 April 2019	Served as minister under Rudd and Gillard. Served as deputy prime minister under Gillard. Retired
	Anika Wells (1985–)	Labor	18 May 2019 – present	Incumbent. Currently a minister under Albanese

== Election results ==
2025 Australian federal election: Lilley
Party	Candidate	Votes	%	±%
Labor	Anika Wells	48,582	46.08	+4.24
Liberal National	Kimberley Washington	29,205	27.70	−2.13
Greens	Melissa Stevens	17,294	16.40	−0.69
One Nation	Michelle McKay	4,485	4.25	+0.18
Trumpet of Patriots	Joshua Morrison	3,128	2.97	+2.97
Family First	Alan Denaro	2,746	2.60	+2.60
Total formal votes		105,440	97.63	+0.33
Informal votes		2,555	2.37	−0.33
Turnout		107,995	91.06	+0.45
Two-party-preferred result
Labor	Anika Wells	68,030	64.52	+3.98
Liberal National	Kimberley Washington	37,410	35.48	−3.98
Labor hold		Swing	+3.98	
