= Jim Hadley =

Australian politician

James Hadley
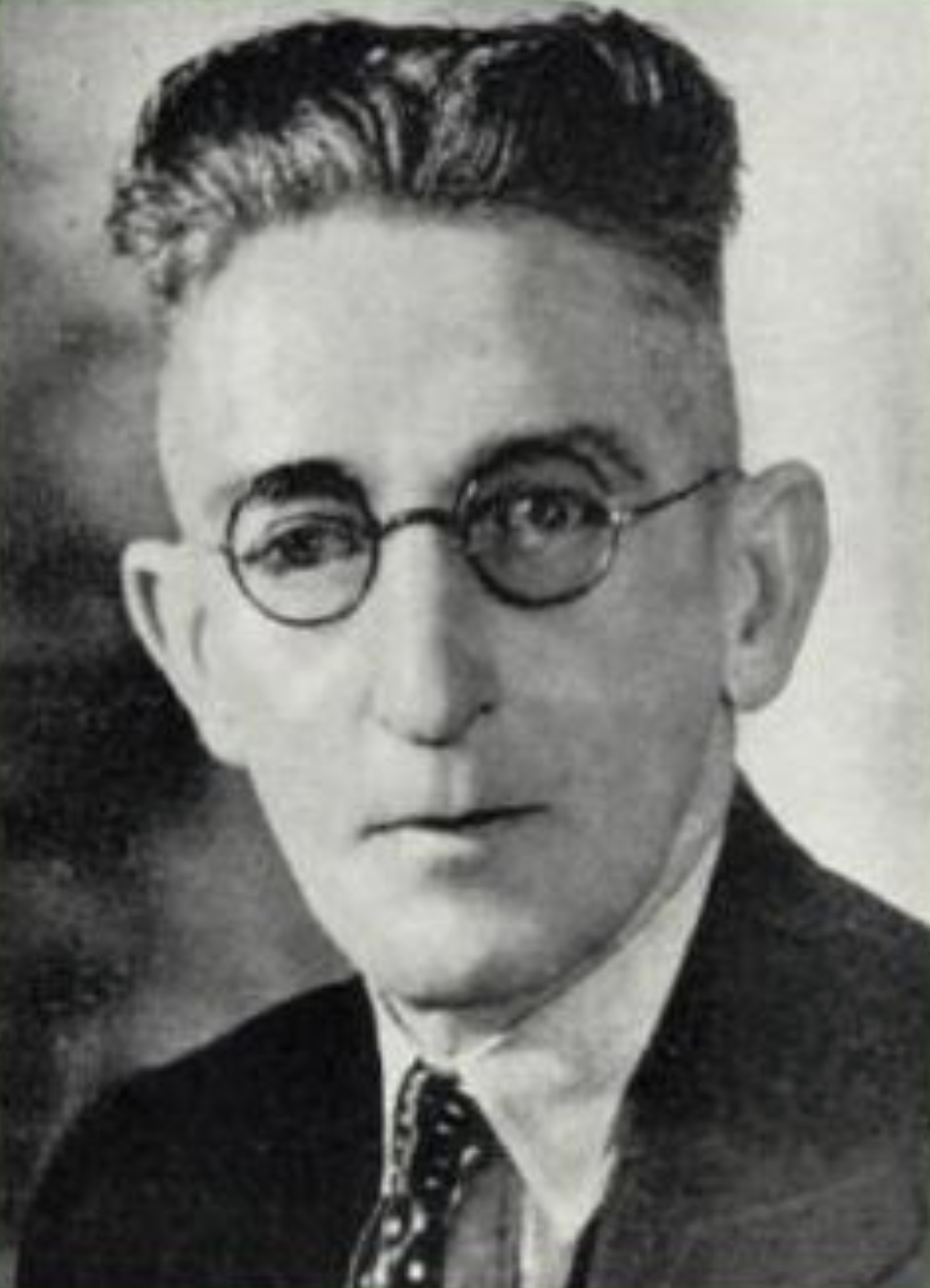

Member of the Australian Parliament for Lilley
- In office 21 August 1943 – 10 December 1949
- Preceded by: William Jolly
- Succeeded by: Bruce Wight

Member of the Queensland Legislative Assembly for Nundah
- In office 19 May 1956 – 3 August 1957
- Preceded by: Frank Roberts
- Succeeded by: William Knox

Personal details
- Born: James William Hadley; 12 June 1893 Brisbane, Queensland, Australia
- Died: 16 July 1971 (aged 78) Brisbane, Queensland, Australia
- Resting place: Nudgee Cemetery
- Party: Australian Labor Party (1943–57)
- Other political affiliations: Queensland Labor Party (1957)
- Spouse: Florence Ethel Whitford
- Occupation: Timber worker

James William Hadley (12 June 1893 – 16 July 1971) was an Australian politician. Born in Brisbane, he received a primary education before becoming a timber worker, after which he worked with the railways. He was also an organiser with the Australian Workers' Union. In 1943, he was elected to the Australian House of Representatives as the Labor member for Lilley, defeating the sitting United Australia Party member, William Jolly. He held the seat until his defeat by the Liberal candidate in 1949. In 1956, he was elected to the Legislative Assembly of Queensland as the member for Nundah, but he was defeated the following year, having defected to the Queensland Labor Party. Hadley died in 1971 and was buried in Nudgee Cemetery.

Parliament of Australia
Preceded by William Jolly	Member for Lilley; 1943–1949	Succeeded by Bruce Wight
Parliament of Queensland
Preceded by Frank Roberts	Member for Nundah; 1956–1957	Succeeded by William Knox
