= Wayne Swan =

Australian politician (born 1954)

The Honourable Wayne Swan
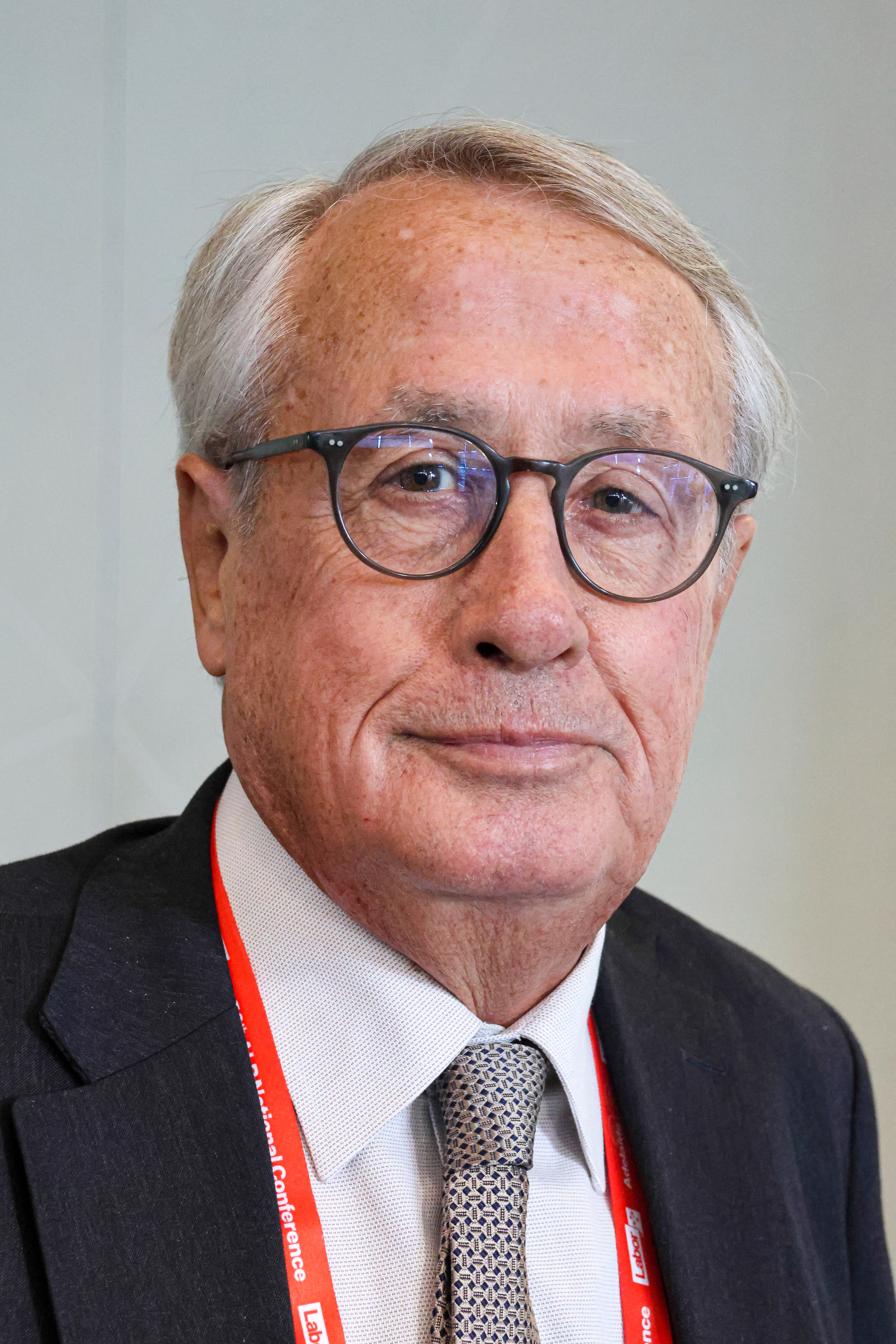
- Swan in 2026

25th National President of the Labor Party
- In office 18 June 2018 – 23 July 2026
- Leader: Bill Shorten; Anthony Albanese
- Preceded by: Mark Butler
- Succeeded by: Kate Ellis

Deputy Prime Minister of Australia
- In office 24 June 2010 – 27 June 2013
- Prime Minister: Julia Gillard
- Preceded by: Julia Gillard
- Succeeded by: Anthony Albanese

Treasurer of Australia
- In office 3 December 2007 – 27 June 2013
- Prime Minister: Kevin Rudd; Julia Gillard
- Preceded by: Peter Costello
- Succeeded by: Chris Bowen

Deputy Leader of the Labor Party
- In office 24 June 2010 – 26 June 2013
- Leader: Julia Gillard
- Preceded by: Julia Gillard
- Succeeded by: Anthony Albanese

Minister for Finance and Deregulation
- In office 3 September 2010 – 14 September 2010
- Prime Minister: Julia Gillard
- Preceded by: Lindsay Tanner
- Succeeded by: Penny Wong

Manager of Opposition Business
- In office 25 November 2001 – 16 June 2003
- Leader: Simon Crean
- Preceded by: Bob McMullan
- Succeeded by: Mark Latham

Member of the Australian Parliament for Lilley
- In office 3 October 1998 – 11 April 2019
- Preceded by: Elizabeth Grace
- Succeeded by: Anika Wells
- In office 13 March 1993 – 2 March 1996
- Preceded by: Elaine Darling
- Succeeded by: Elizabeth Grace

Personal details
- Born: Wayne Maxwell Swan; 30 June 1954 (age 72) Nambour, Queensland
- Party: Labor
- Spouse: Kim Swan (m. 1984)
- Children: Erinn; Libbi; Matthew
- Education: University of Queensland
- Website: ALP info

Wayne Maxwell Swan (born 30 June 1954) is an Australian politician who served as the 25th National President of the Labor Party since 2018, previously serving as the 14th deputy prime minister of Australia and the deputy leader of the Labor Party from 2010 to 2013, and the treasurer of Australia from 2007 to 2013.

Swan was first elected to the House of Representatives in 1993 for Lilley in Queensland, although he lost this seat in 1996. He regained the seat in 1998 and represented it until retiring in 2019. Following Labor's victory in 2007, Swan was appointed Treasurer of Australia by Prime Minister Kevin Rudd. In this position, he played a key role in Australia's response to the 2008 financial crisis and the Great Recession. In 2010, after Julia Gillard became Prime Minister, Swan was elected unopposed as Labor's deputy leader and was subsequently sworn in as Deputy Prime Minister. In 2011, Swan was named Finance Minister of the Year by Euromoney magazine, joining Paul Keating as the only Australian Treasurer to have been awarded that title. After Rudd successfully challenged Gillard for the leadership in June 2013, Swan resigned from Cabinet.

== Early life and career ==
Swan was born and educated in Nambour, Queensland. He attended Nambour State High School and graduated in 1972. Kevin Rudd attended the same school at the same time, though was three years younger than Swan and the two did not know each other.

Swan won a Commonwealth scholarship to study Public Administration at the University of Queensland, where he resided at Emmanuel College and graduated with a Bachelor of Arts. After graduating he worked as a lecturer in the Department of Management at the Queensland Institute of Technology. From 1978 to 1980, Swan acted as a policy adviser to Labor Leader Bill Hayden, and from 1983 to 1984 was an adviser to government ministers Mick Young and Kim Beazley. He led the Queensland Labor Party campaign during the 1989 Queensland state election, where Labor won a landslide victory, ending 32 years of National Party rule with Wayne Goss elected Premier. He was also campaign director for the 1992 state election, working as the state secretary of Queensland Labor from 1991 to 1993.

== Political career ==
=== Parliament ===
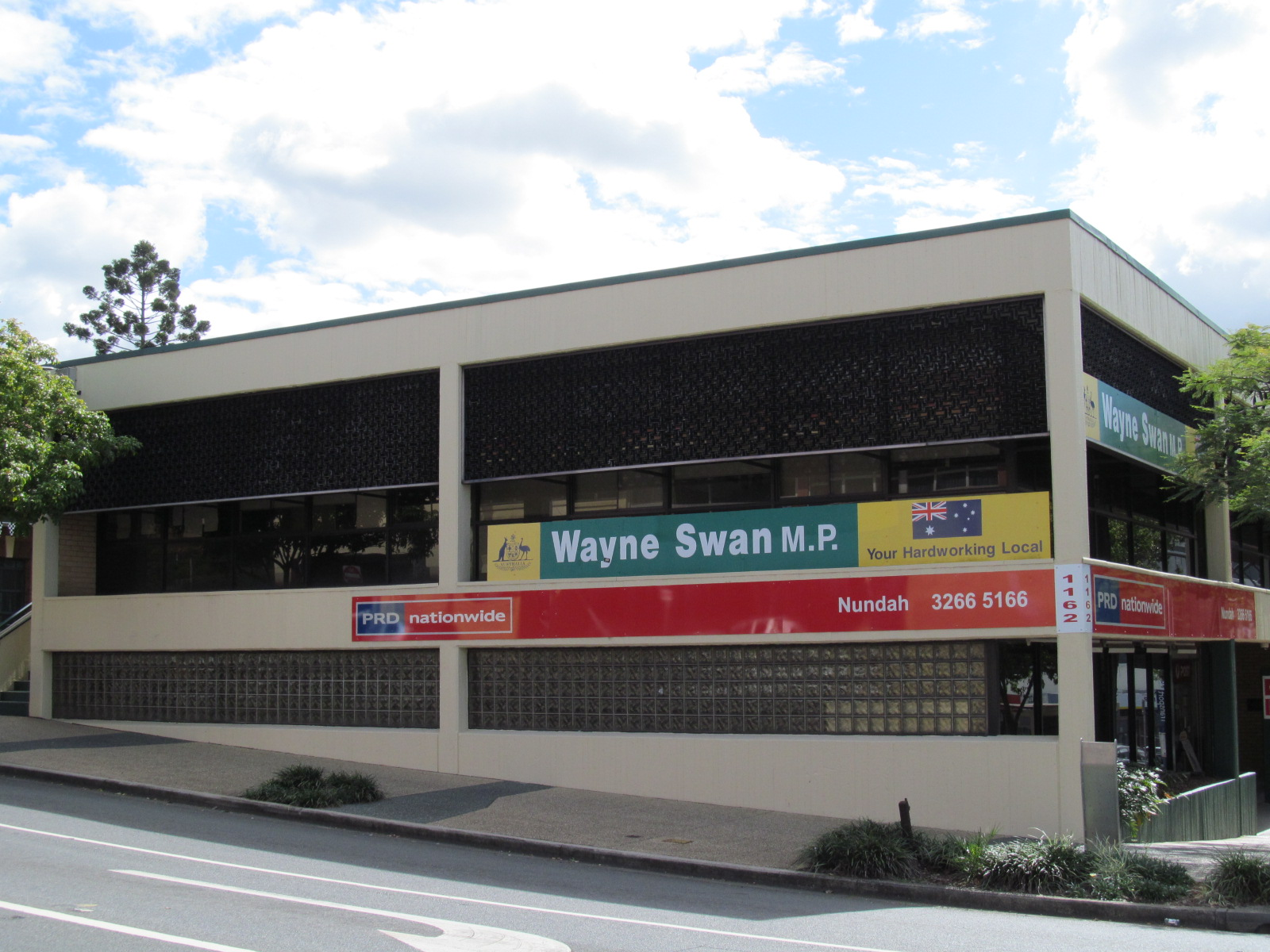
Wayne Swan's office in 2013

Swan was first elected as the member for Lilley in the 1993 federal election, but was defeated three years later by Elizabeth Grace in what was a large defeat for Labor nationwide. In 1996, Swan donated $500–$1400 (amount disputed) to the Australian Democrats campaign manager in his seat of Lilley. At the time, speculation surrounded the nature of the donation. The matter was referred to the Australian Federal Police who chose to take no further action. He worked as an adviser to Labor Leader Kim Beazley before contesting Lilley again in the 1998 federal election and regaining the seat.

=== Shadow Cabinet ===
Kim Beazley promoted Swan to the Shadow Cabinet in 1998. Initially serving as shadow Minister for Family and Community Services, he became the Manager of Opposition Business in 2001. During the 2003 Labor leadership spills he was a prominent supporter of Kim Beazley, but retained his position in the Shadow Cabinet when Mark Latham became the new leader. After the 2004 federal election defeat, Swan was promoted to become Shadow Treasurer. This was seen by many as a surprise, as it was rumoured that Latham was intending to appoint then-shadow Health Minister Julia Gillard to the position. It was believed that strong opposition from Labor's Right Faction had put Latham under pressure to appoint either Swan or shadow Industrial Relations Minister Stephen Smith to the position. Early in the role, Swan worked to devise Labor's response to the Howard government's 2006 budget, with Labor proposing tax relief for low and middle-income earners. Swan launched his book during the same month, Postcode: The Splintering of a Nation.

After Kevin Rudd successfully challenged Kim Beazley to win the leadership of the Labor Party in December 2006, he reappointed Swan as shadow Treasurer. In early November 2007, Swan and Rudd revisited their old high school in Nambour. Rudd gave a speech to students, in which he said that, while at school, "Wayne was very, very cool; and I was very, very not".

=== Treasurer ===
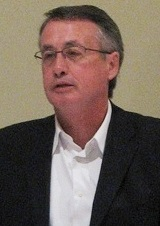
Swan in 2008

Following Labor's landslide win in the 2007 federal election, Swan was appointed Treasurer of Australia by prime minister Kevin Rudd on 3 December 2007.

Swan's first budget concentrated on inflationary pressures in the economy, with substantially reduced spending that exceeded the A$11 billion outlaid for tax cuts. The policy debate shifted around August 2008 after mortgage lending banks in the United States began to collapse and economic activity faltered as American investments were written off. In response to the resulting global downturn, Swan coordinated an "economic security strategy" worth $10 billion in October 2008. Designed as a stimulus package and directed towards retail sales, it was largely supported by the International Monetary Fund. When the December quarterly growth report showed the economy contracting, he moved ahead with the Nation Building and Jobs Plan to provide government-sponsored work worth A$42 billion. This action was widely credited with preventing Australia from following much of the world into recession, as the March 2009 quarterly growth report showed that the economy had returned to growth.

On 20 September 2011, Swan was named Finance Minister of the Year by Euromoney magazine, joining Paul Keating as the only Australian Treasurer to have been conferred that title.

In March 2012, Swan became the first treasurer or deputy prime minister to be ejected from the House of Representatives, after he referred to Andrew Robb, the then-opposition finance spokesperson, as "Curly", in reference to The Three Stooges.

In an essay published in The Monthly magazine in March 2012, Swan criticised the rising influence of vested interests, in particular paying attention to mining entrepreneurs Clive Palmer, Gina Rinehart and Andrew Forrest, and how Swan believed they are threatening Australia's egalitarian social contract. and a subsequent address to the National Press Club, In The Monthly essay he opined:

The latest example of this is the foray by Australia’s richest person, Gina Rinehart, into Fairfax Media, reportedly in an attempt to wield greater influence on public opinion and further her commercial interests at a time when the overwhelming economic consensus is that it's critical to use the economic weight of the resources boom to strengthen the entire economy.

Politicians have a choice: between exploiting divisions by promoting fear and appealing to the sense of fairness and decency that is the foundation of our middle-class society; between standing up for workers and kneeling down at the feet of the Gina Rineharts and the Clive Palmers.

For every Andrew Forrest who wails about high company taxes and then admits to not paying any, there are a hundred Australian businesspeople who held on to their employees and worked with government to keep the doors of Australian business open during the GFC. Despite the howling of a small minority, the vast bulk of the resources industry is in the cart for more efficient profits-based resource taxation which serves to strengthen our entire economy. The vast majority of our miners accept that they have a social obligation to pay their fair share of tax on the resources Australians own.

=== Deputy Prime Minister ===
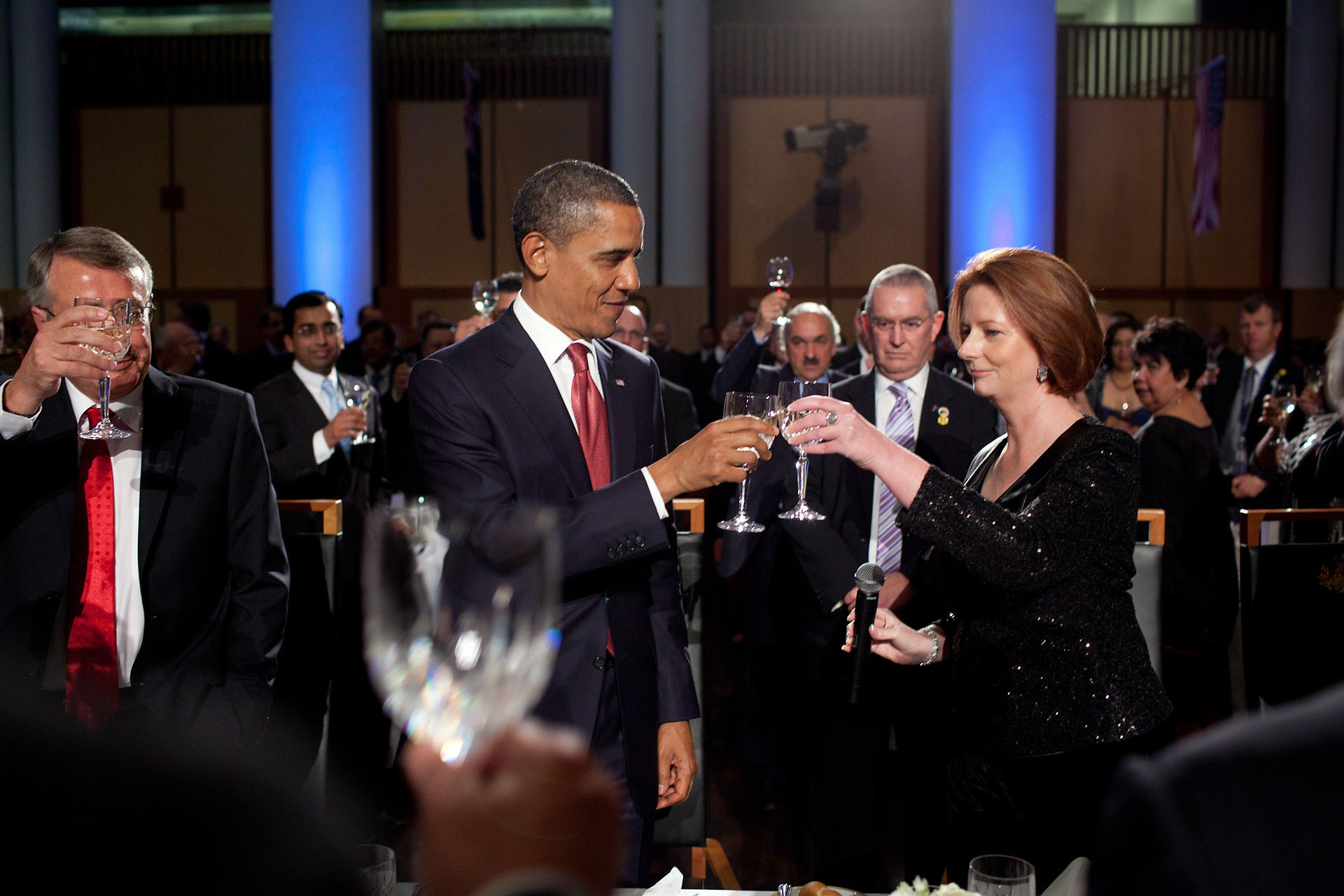
Wayne Swan, Barack Obama and Julia Gillard toast at a dinner at Parliament House in 2011

On 23 June 2010, Deputy Prime Minister Julia Gillard challenged Kevin Rudd for the leadership of the Labor Party. Realising that he no longer had enough support to retain his position, Rudd resigned the following day, allowing Gillard to be elected unopposed. Swan stood to fill the vacant position of Deputy Leader, and was also elected unopposed. He was sworn in as Deputy Prime Minister of Australia later that day. Days later, Swan attended the G20 Toronto Summit in Gillard's place. He would regularly stand in for Gillard as Acting Prime Minister for the next three years.

=== Resignation and retirement ===
Swan resigned from his positions to return to the backbench following the return of Kevin Rudd to the leadership in June 2013. After Labor lost the 2013 federal election, he remained in Parliament and retained his seat at the 2016 federal election. On 10 February 2018, he announced that he would not contest the 2019 federal election and that he would retire from politics.

=== Personal collection ===
Swan donated his personal collection of records to the State Library of Queensland's John Oxley Library. The collection reflects the history of Swan's time in public office and in particular is a record of his experience as: Secretary of the Queensland Labor Party (1991–1993) Federal MP and Member for the seat of Lilley from 1993 to 1996, 1998–2019, Treasurer of Australia (2007–2013), Deputy Prime Minister and Deputy Leader of the ALP (2010–2013) and National President of the Australian Labor Party (2018–present). A substantial part of the collection relates to the 2008 financial crisis and is highly significant given that Australia was a key contributor to G20 discussions. The collection includes photographs, correspondence, campaign materials and political documents. In 2021 the State Library produced a digital story with Swan. The interview by Dennis Atkins covers Swan's time in public office and his life before and after politics as well as the 2008 financial crisis and Swan's role in the implementation of an effective domestic stimulus response to the crisis.

== Later activities ==
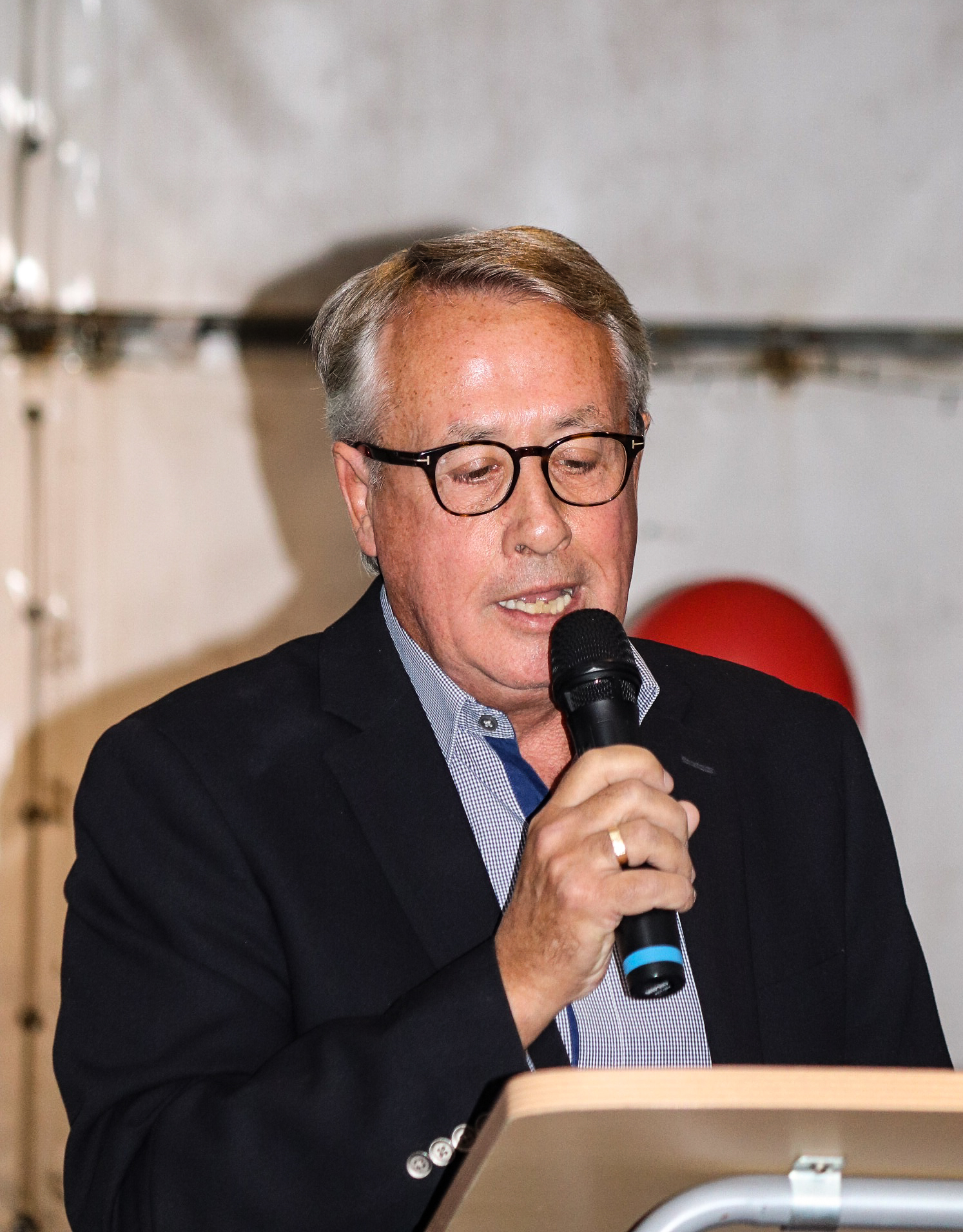
Swan in 2018

In June 2018, Swan was elected national president of the ALP, defeating incumbent president Mark Butler. According to Guardian Australia's political editor Katharine Murphy, he "prevailed in a contest where the left faction normally dominates by appealing to progressive rank-and-file ALP members courtesy of his relentless campaigning on inequality". He was re-elected to a further term as president in April 2023. In June 2024 he publicly criticised the Albanese government's Future Gas Strategy, stating that Australia should not be expanding gas production.

In August 2021, it was announced that Swan would be appointed chairman of Cbus, a superannuation fund associated with the construction industry, with effect from January 2022. He replaced former Victorian premier Steve Bracks in the role. In November 2024, the Australian Securities and Investments Commission sued Cbus over claims that it had mishandled disability and death benefit claims. Swan was subsequently called to give testimony on the matter before the Senate Economics Committee, during which he publicly apologised for the delays in payments of claims.

In October 2025, Swan announced that he would retire as president of the Australian Labor Party in July 2026. He was succeeded upon the commencement of the national conference of the party by former Rudd–Gillard government minister Kate Ellis.

== Books ==
- Postcode: The Splintering of a Nation
- The Good Fight: Six years, two prime ministers and staring down the Great Recession

== Personal life ==
Swan is married to Kim and has three children. An earlier marriage, when he was 21, lasted for one year.

At age 48, Swan was diagnosed with prostate cancer but has since fully recovered. He has become an advocate for the prostate cancer public awareness campaign.

Swan has admitted to smoking cannabis.

== See also ==
- First Rudd Ministry
- First Gillard Ministry
- Second Gillard Ministry

Parliament of Australia
Preceded by Elaine Darling	Member of Parliament for Lilley; 1993–1996	Succeeded by Elizabeth Grace
Preceded by Elizabeth Grace	Member of Parliament for Lilley; 1998–2019	Succeeded by Anika Wells
Political offices
Preceded by Peter Costello	Treasurer of Australia; 2007–2013	Succeeded by Chris Bowen
Preceded by Julia Gillard	Deputy Prime Minister of Australia; 2010–2013	Succeeded by Anthony Albanese
Party political offices
Preceded by Julia Gillard	Deputy Leader of the Labor Party; 2010–2013	Succeeded by Anthony Albanese
Preceded by Mark Butler	National President of the Labor Party; 2018–present	Incumbent
