= Francis J. Doyle III =

American chemical engineer (born 1963)

Provost of Brown University
- Incumbent
- Assumed office July 1, 2023
- Preceded by: Richard M. Locke

Personal details
- Born: 1963 (age 62–63) Philadelphia, Pennsylvania, U.S.
- Spouse: Diana Rodriguez
- Children: 3
- Education: Princeton University (BSE); Cambridge University (MSc); California Institute of Technology (PhD)
- Profession: College administrator, Academic

Francis "Frank" J. Doyle III (born 1963) is an American engineer and academic administrator. He is a professor of engineering and provost of Brown University.

== Biography ==
Francis J. Doyle III was born in Philadelphia in 1963. His family moved to Newark, Delaware, when Francis was 2. His father worked as a chemical engineer.

Doyle completed his undergraduate studies at Princeton University in 1985, receiving a B.S.E. in chemical engineering. He received an M.Sc. (C.P.G.S.) in chemical engineering from Cambridge University in 1986, and a Ph.D. in chemical engineering from the California Institute of Technology in 1991.

Prior to his appointment at UCSB, Doyle was a professor in the department of chemical engineering at the University of Delaware (1997–2002), and was a professor in the School of Chemical Engineering at Purdue University (1992–1997). Between his graduate studies and his first academic appointment, he completed postdoctoral studies at the DuPont Company.

Doyle was dean of the Harvard John A. Paulson School of Engineering and Applied Sciences from 2015 to 2023.

In 2021, Doyle was elected a member of the National Academy of Engineering for insights into natural biological control systems and innovative engineering of diabetes control devices.

Doyle began his tenure as 14th provost of Brown University in July 2023.

== Honors and recognition ==
Doyle has received a number of honors throughout his career, including:

- National Academy of Engineering (NAE) Member, 2021
- National Academy of Medicine (NAM) Member, 2016
- AACC Control Engineering Practice Award, 2015
- American Association for the Advancement of Science (AAAS) Fellow, 2011
- American Institute for Medical and Biological Engineering Fellow, 2009
- International Federation of Automatic Control Fellow, 2009
- Institute of Electrical and Electronics Engineers (IEEE) Fellow, 2008
- Computing in Chemical Engineering Award (AIChE CAST Division), 2005
- Alexander von Humboldt Research Fellow, 2001-2002
- ASEE Ray Fahien Award, 2000
- Office of Naval Research Young Investigator Award, 1996–1999
- ASEE Section Outstanding Teacher Award (Illinois/Indiana), 1996
- National Science Foundation National Young Investigator Award, 1992–1997

He has also held leadership positions in professional societies including the IEEE (as President of the Control Systems Society) and as Vice President of the International Federation for Automatic Control (IFAC), among others.

== Personal life ==
Frank is married to Diana Rodriguez, and they have 3 children. In his free time, Frank enjoys racing sailboats, and has competed in a number of regattas during and since college, including the 2011 Transpac Race. His other hobby is refereeing soccer, and he is currently certified in several organizations including AYSO (National Referee), U.S Soccer (Grade 7 Referee), and NISOA.
