= Frank Doyle (politician) =

Australian politician

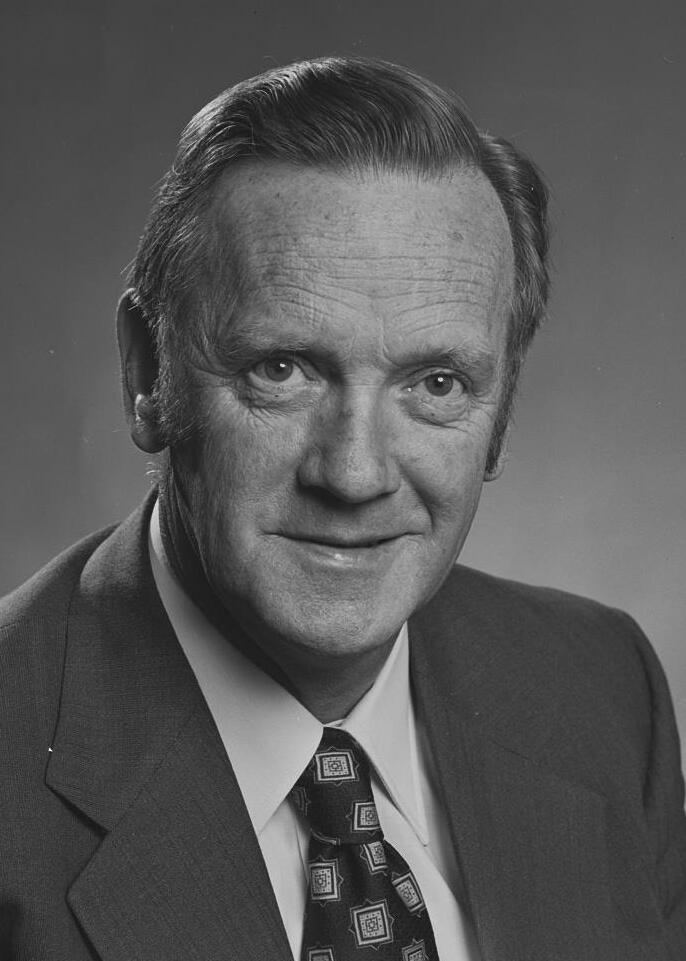

Member of the Australian Parliament for Lilley
- In office 2 December 1972 – 18 May 1974
- Preceded by: Kevin Cairns
- Succeeded by: Kevin Cairns

Personal details
- Born: 17 June 1922 Oakey, Queensland
- Died: 13 March 1984 (aged 61)
- Party: Australian Labor Party
- Occupation: Engine driver

Francis Edward Doyle (17 June 1922 – 13 March 1984) was an Australian politician. He was a member of the Australian House of Representatives from 1972 to 1974, representing the electorate of Lilley.

Doyle was born in Oakey, Queensland. He worked as a train driver across regional Queensland and was Queensland state secretary of the Australian Federated Union of Locomotive Enginemen from 1958 to 1972. He was also a member of the state executive of the Labor Party. Doyle was an unsuccessful nominee for Labor Senate preselection in 1967 and was the unsuccessful Labor candidate for Lilley at the 1969 federal election, topping the primary votes but losing on Democratic Labor Party preferences.

He was elected to the House of Representatives at the 1972 federal election, defeating sitting Lilley MP and former minister Kevin Cairns by only 35 votes. He lost a rematch with Cairns at the 1974 election, and tried to reclaim his seat unsuccessfully at the 1975 election.

In March 1975, he was appointed as the first Queensland director of the Australian Trade Union Training Authority, serving in that role until his death in 1984.

Parliament of Australia
Preceded by Kevin Cairns	Member for Lilley; 1972 – 1974	Succeeded by Kevin Cairns
