= Peterswald v Bartley =

- Court: High Court of Australia
- Decided: 31 August 1904
- Citations: [1904] HCA 21, (1904) 1 CLR 497.

Case history
- Prior actions: Peterswald v Bartley [1904] NSWStRp 28, (1904) 4 SR (NSW) 290
- Appealed from: Supreme Court (Full Court) (NSW)

Court membership
- Judges sitting: Griffith CJ, Barton and O'Connor JJ

Case opinions
- (3:0) The Court took a narrow approach to the meaning of excise in relation to section 90, holding that a licence fee that did not depend on the brewer's output was not an excise.

Laws applied
- Overruled by
- Ha v New South Wales [1997] HCA 34, (1997) 189 CLR 465

Peterswald v Bartley is an early High Court of Australia case that dealt with section 90 of the Australian Constitution, which prohibits States from levying excise.

== Background ==
Bartley was a brewer of beer at Cootamundra in the state of New South Wales. He had a licence under the Commonwealth Beer Excise Act 1901 however he didn't have a licence under the NSW Liquor Act 1898. Sergeant Peterswald was a police officer and District Licensing Inspector and he charged Bartley with carrying on the trade or business of a brewer without holding a licence under the NSW Act and the issue concerned the payment of a licence fee. The Police Magistrate upheld Bartley's contention that the licence fee was an excise duty and that the effect of section 90 of the Australian Constitution was that the state Act ceased to have effect once the Commonwealth imposed uniform customs duties. Peterswald appealed to the Supreme Court of NSW, where the Sergeant was represented by the then Attorney-General of NSW, Bernhard Wise KC. The Supreme Court, by a majority, Darley CJ and Owen J, dismissed the appeal. Pring J dissented.

== Decision ==
Griffith CJ delivered the judgement of the court, noting that "the Constitution was framed in Australia by Australians, and for the use of the Australian people", and holding that an excise is a customs duty imposed on goods either in relation to quantity or value when produced or manufactured and not in the sense of a direct or personal tax. His Honour outlined four elements of an excise:

- The goods must be locally produced within the State.
- The tax must be imposed at the point of production or manufacture.
- The tax must be imposed in proportion to the quantity or value of the goods in question.
- It must be an indirect tax that gets passed on to the consumer through a higher price of goods.

The Court held that the amount of the NSW licence fee did not depend on the quantity of beer manufactured and was a direct tax on manufacture. The licence fee was therefore not an excise and the brewer was required to hold a licence under the NSW Act as well as the Commonwealth Act.

His Honour's requirement that the tax be imposed at the point of production or manufacture forms what is known as the narrow approach to section 90. The narrow approach was rejected by the High Court in Ha v New South Wales.

== See also ==
- Australian constitutional law
- Brown v. Maryland - decision of the U.S. Supreme Court on meaning of "imposts or duties on imports or exports" in a clause similar to Section 90, which was analysed by the court in Peterswald
