= Dennis Hotels Pty Ltd v Victoria =

Judgement of the High Court of Australia

- Court: High Court of Australia
- Decided: 26 February 1960
- Citations: [1960] HCA 10, (1960) 104 CLR 529

Case history
- Appealed to: Privy Council [1961] UKPC 26, [1962] AC 25; [1961] UKPCHCA 1, (1961) 104 CLR 621

Court membership
- Judges sitting: Dixon CJ, McTiernan, Fullagar, Kitto, Taylor, Menzies and Windeyer JJ

Case opinions
- (4:3) The fee for the renewal of a liquor retailer's licence was held not to be an excise (per Fullagar, Kitto, Menzies & Taylor JJ) (4:3) The fee for the temporary licence was held to be an excise (per Dixon CJ, McTiernan, Menzies & Windeyer JJ)

Dennis Hotels Pty Ltd v Victoria, is a High Court of Australia case that deals with section 90 of the Australian Constitution, which prohibits States from levying customs or excise duties. Although some of the judges used the now-discredited criterion of liability approach, this case remains authority for cases that are factually similar to it.

== Background ==
The Licensing Act 1958 (Vic) contained two sections of contention. Section 19(1)(a) imposed fees for the grant or renewal of liquor licences, and the fee was calculated as 6 percent of the value of liquor purchased during the 12 months up to June 30 of the previous year. Section 19(1)(b) imposed fees for temporary licences, and the fee would be 1 pound per day together with 6 percent of the value of liquor purchased.

== Decision ==
Three judges, Fullagar, Kitto and Taylor JJ, used the highly formalistic criterion of liability approach (which has since been discredited) to decide this case. In this approach, the fees were not viewed as excise duties because the criterion of liability does not fall in a step between the production of the good and the receipt of the good by the consumer due to the backdating (per Kitto J). The payment of the fee is seen as occurring as part of business generally; also, because the fee is not payable at the time of the purchase of the liquor, and because the retailer may choose not to renew his licence, the fee does not necessarily become an indirect cost for the consumer. The distinction, therefore, is that the fees were imposed not on goods, but on licences, and thus not an excise duty. These three judges held that the fees were not excise duties and hence were not invalid.

However, three judges, Dixon CJ, McTiernan and Windeyer JJ, held that the fees were excise duties. Dixon CJ asserted that it is a tax upon goods, because it is a cost that is bound to be recovered by the person paying the tax. The provisions of the Act, when taken together, burdened liquor as a commodity, regardless of the channel through which the tax flowed. Dixon CJ disregarded the argument that licensees may not renew their licences and hence not fall within the ambit of the provisions, by stating that the provisions "deal with the distribution of liquor in Victoria as a continuous operation and impose the tax accordingly"; it is immaterial that the tax on the goods is paid at a later date. These three judges held that the fees were excise duties and hence invalid by virtue of section 90.

Menzies J was the decisive judgment, although he followed the narrow approach to excise duty. His Honour found that the backdated fee was not a tax on production or manufacture, and was therefore not a duty of excise, applying the minority judgment in Parton v Milk Board (Vic). However, in deciding the character of the fee for the temporary licence, he felt constrained by Parton, and held that it was an excise duty.

An appeal to the Privy Council was dismissed as incompetent as the High Court had not issued a certificate under section 74 of the Constitution.

== Criticism ==
This case caused a great deal of criticism in the academic community due to the split in the Court and the uncertainty it created. The Zelman Cowen Professor of Law at the University of Melbourne, Professor Michael Crommelin AO, remarked that the decision "was one of the worst in the Court's history" and "certainly not its finest hour". According to Professor Crommelin, this was due to the "utter confusion" and "complete absence of reasoning" in the various judgments.

== See also ==
- Section 90 of the Constitution of Australia
- Australian constitutional law
