= Percival Savage =

Australian soldier and agricultural expert (1894–1976)

Percival Savage DSO, MBE
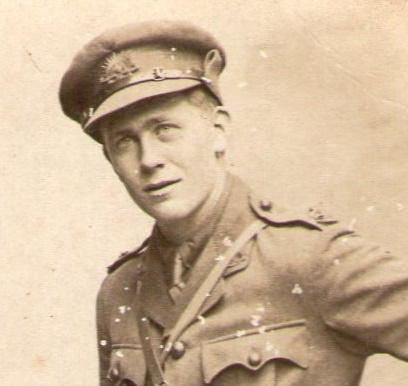
- Major Percival Savage in 1916
- Born: 22 October 1894; Ipswich, Queensland
- Died: 26 June 1976 (aged 81); Brisbane, Queensland
- Occupations: Soldier; farmer; agricultural administrator
- Years active: 1914–1973
- Spouse: Marjorie Hall (m. 1924)
- Children: Percy; Mary; Bettina
- Awards: Member of the Order of the British Empire
- Military career
- Allegiance: Australia
- Branch: Australian Imperial Force; Volunteer Defence Corps
- Service years: 1914–1919; 1942–1943
- Rank: Major
- Conflicts: First World War; Gallipoli campaign; Landing at Anzac Cove; Western Front; Battle of the Somme; Battle of Pozières; Battle of Passchendaele; Battle of Amiens; Second World War
- Awards: Distinguished Service Order; Mentioned in Despatches (3)

Percival James Savage, DSO, MBE (22 October 1894 – 26 June 1976) was an Australian soldier, farmer and agricultural administrator. He served in the First World War, fighting as at Gallipoli, the Somme, Pozières, Passchendaele and Amiens. He rose rapidly through the ranks, becoming a major at the age of 21. He was awarded the Distinguished Service Order and mentioned in despatches three times.

After the war, Savage started a farm at Brookfield near Brisbane. He was chairman of the board of the Committee of Direction of Fruit Marketing in Queensland for 30 years. In 1964 Savage presided over the establishment of the Golden Circle cannery. In 1969 he was appointed a Member of the Order of the British Empire, for his services to the fruit and vegetable industry of Queensland.

== Early life ==
Percival Savage was born in Ipswich, Queensland, on 22 October 1894. He was the son of Richard Savage, a blacksmith, and Mary-Ann Savage (née McDowell). Savage attended Ipswich Boys Grammar School. He initially worked for the Queensland Railway as a coach builder.

== War years ==
Within a month of war being declared he enlisted in the 3rd Field Company Engineers. On 22 September 1914, he boarded the HMAT "Geelong" in Melbourne for Egypt. He was nineteen years ten months.

=== Gallipoli and Egypt ===
On 11 December 1914 the 3rd Field Company arrived at Mena training camp close to the pyramids. After almost four months at Camp Mena the company sailed from Alexandria to Mudros Bay on the Greek island of Lemnos. This was the staging post for Gallipoli, 100 km to the north-east. Here they constructed sledges for conveying materials ashore. They took on board casks of water, timber, shovels and barbed wire. Their ship arrived off Anzac Cove before dawn on 25 April 1915, and the company landed early that morning.

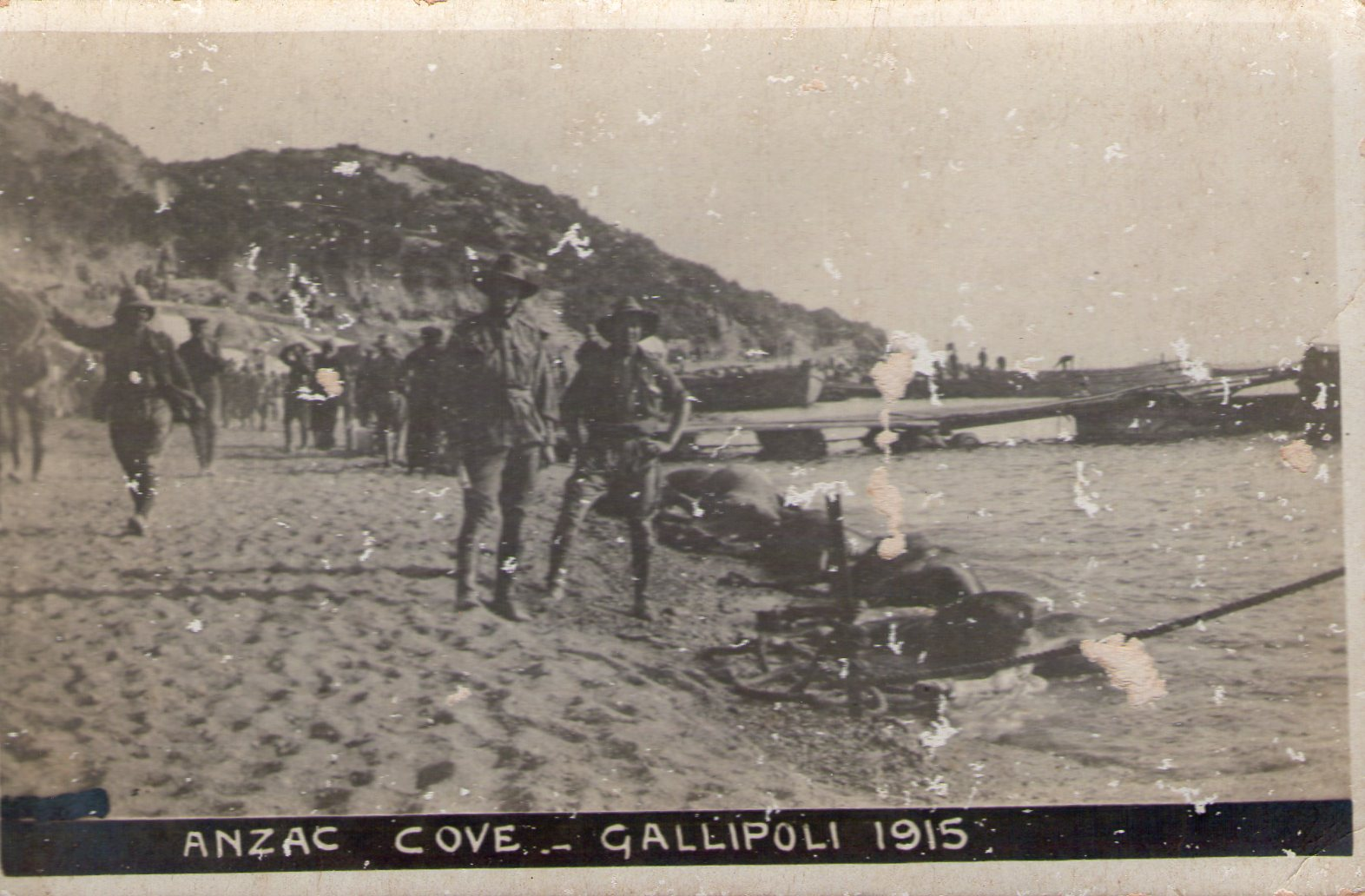
Postcard from Anzac Cove, Gallipoli, 1915, sent by Savage

Company diaries show the engineers (also called sappers) digging firing line and communication trenches, sniping posts, machine gun pits and a well. They created barbed wire barriers, prepared maps of the Turkish trenches and made hand grenades. Where trenches would be overlooked by the Turkish forces, tunnels were constructed.

Savage progressed rapidly through the ranks. He was promoted to lieutenant in February 1915, and captain on 26 July. From September 1915 on, he wrote the company's official unit diary. On 11 November, shortly after Savage's 21st birthday, the 3rd Field Company Engineers withdrew from Gallipoli back to Egypt.

On 19 March 1916, while stationed at Serapeum, Egypt, they were inspected by the Prince of Wales.

=== France and the Western Front ===
On 26 March 1916, he embarked on the HMT Maryland for Marseille, France, along with 35 other troops and 74 horses. While stationed at Sailly in France, he was commissioned to the rank of Major on 12 May 1916, at the age of 21, the youngest Major in the AIF.

In late July 1916, he fought at the Battle of Pozières (part of the Battle of the Somme), for which he was awarded the Distinguished Service Order (19 August 1916). He was chosen (together with Colonel J.A. "Reg" Robinson) to represent the first AIF at an award ceremony in Buckingham Palace. He received the DSO from George V. The DSO was:

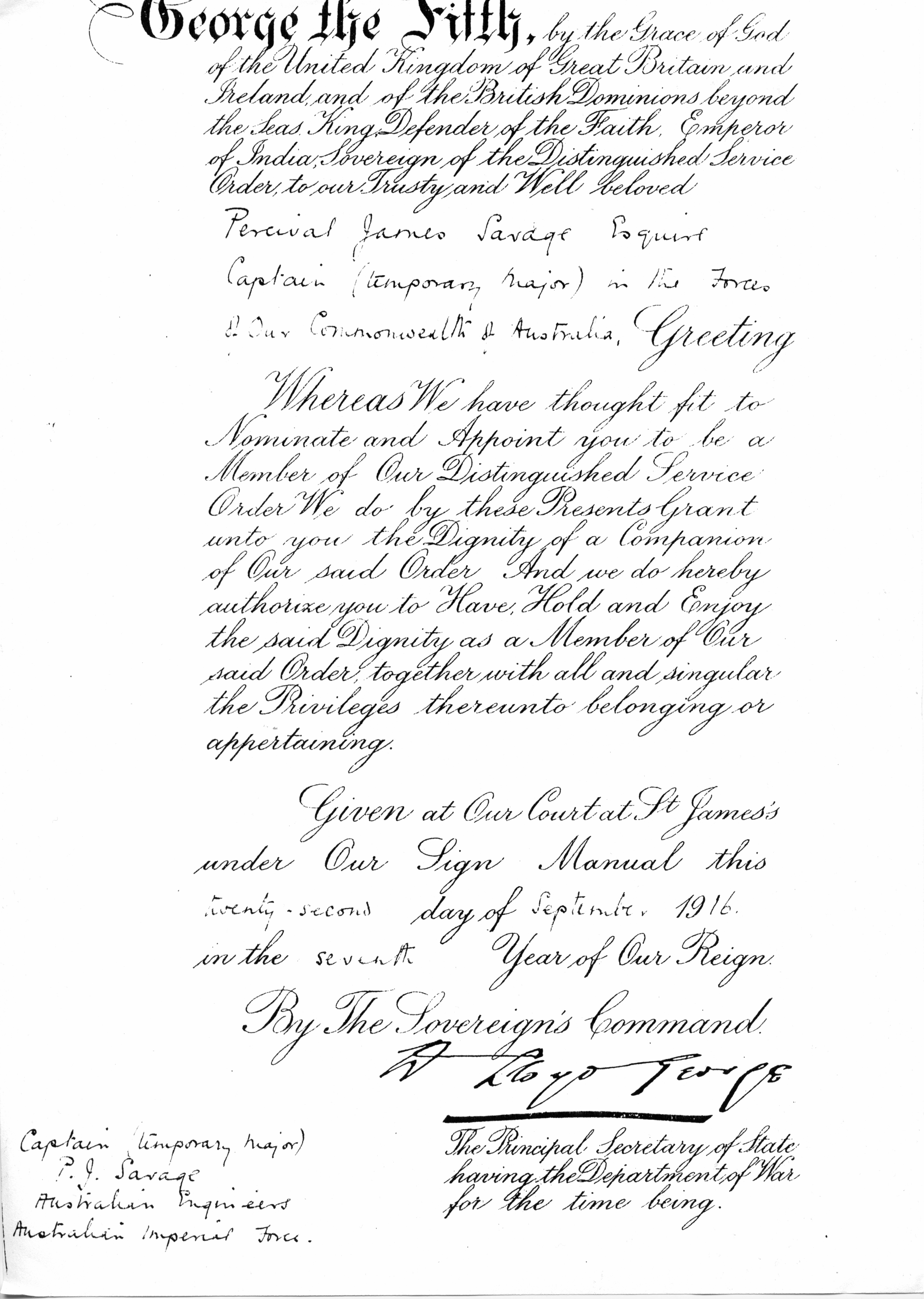
Certificate for the DSO of Major Percival Savage, given by King George V, 22 September 1916

For conspicuous gallantry and ability during a period of operations under very heavy shell fire. The good work done by his company was due to his untiring energy and fine powers of leadership

In September 1917, he fought in the Third Battle of Ypres (the Battle of Passchendaele). For this he was mentioned in dispatches. In the weeks leading up to the conflict, there was a great deal of preparation for the possibility of mustard gas attack: an instruction in gas drill and numerous gas drills. Gas-proof doors and windows were installed as they did engineering works on buildings. The preparations proved to be necessary: there were nerve gas attacks on five different occasions in March 1918. On 21 March 1918, the war diary records:

Gas alarm early morning. The locality was again subjected to a heavy gas and shell bombardment, which lasted for over 3 hours. The gas guard dropped anti-gas curtains at both entrances and warned all ranks, including those living outside. Gas entered the tunnel from the rear. This was caused by a large gas shell bursting at the mouth of the first tunnel in rear ... Box respirators were worn from 1/2 to 2 hours.

In August 1918 Savage fought in the Battle of Amiens. He was stationed at Vaire-sous-Corbie in the Picardy region.

On three occasions it was recommended that he be promoted to colonel, but he was considered too young.

=== Second World War ===
During the Second World War Savage led the Brookfield Voluntary Defence Corps.

== Career as a farmer and agricultural administrator ==
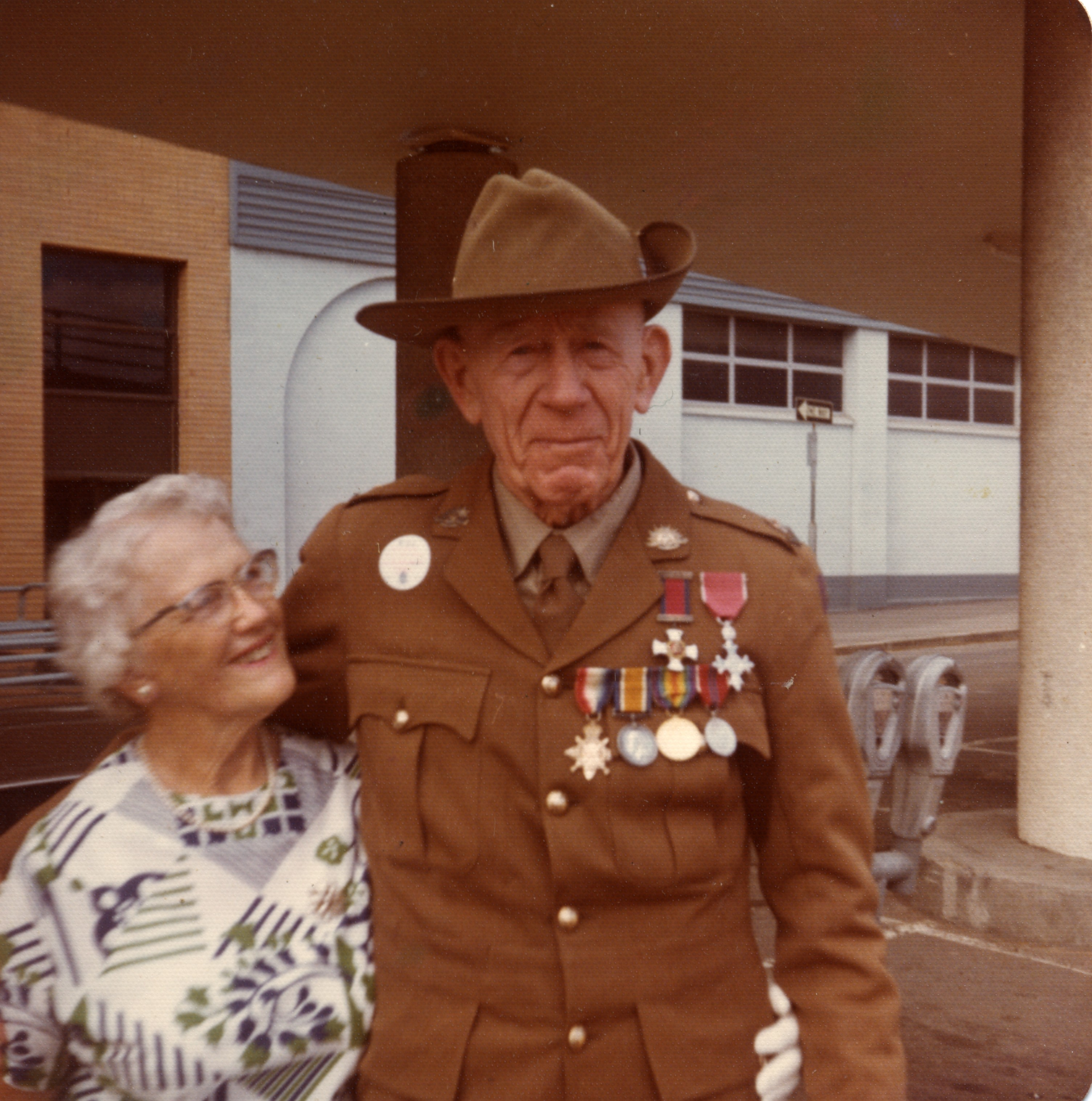
Major Percival Savage, with Marjorie Savage, on Anzac Day in 1974

Upon his return from military service, he used his entire earnings from the war (£1000) to buy a farm at Brookfield, near Brisbane. There was no road to the property, so he cut one out of the bush (this road is now known by his name, Savages Road). He lived there for 54 years, growing custard apples, papaws and bananas. He named the property 'Purple Patch', after the patch he wore in his army company (the 3rd AIF Engineers).

As a farmer, he became involved in the Committee of Direction (COD) of Fruit Marketing in Queensland. He was elected chairman in 1937, serving until 1967 as chairman, then until 1973 as vice-chairman, when he retired.

In 1947, Savage (together with Bernard Flewell-Smith, the General Manager of the COD) oversaw the establishment of a pineapple cannery at Northgate, Brisbane. In 1964 they established the cannery as a separate business (now known as Golden Circle). It was split off from the COD by an amendment to the Fruit Marketing Organisation Acts.

In 1969 he was appointed a Member of the Order of the British Empire for his services to the fruit and vegetable industry of Queensland.

== Death ==
In late 1975 Savage was diagnosed with cerebral atherosclerosis and dementia. He retired to the Pinjarra Nursing home, run by the Department of Veteran's Affairs. He died on 26 June 1976.

Savage's ashes were buried at the root of a bottle tree in his front yard in Kenmore. His wife Marjorie commented that she'd had no idea he was so sentimental. Her ashes were buried there years later in 1985 when she died.

Savage was the subject of a museum exhibition in the Brookfield District Museum in 2015, commemorating the centenary of the landing at Gallipoli.
