= Bindha railway station =

Railway station in Queensland, Australia

Bindha
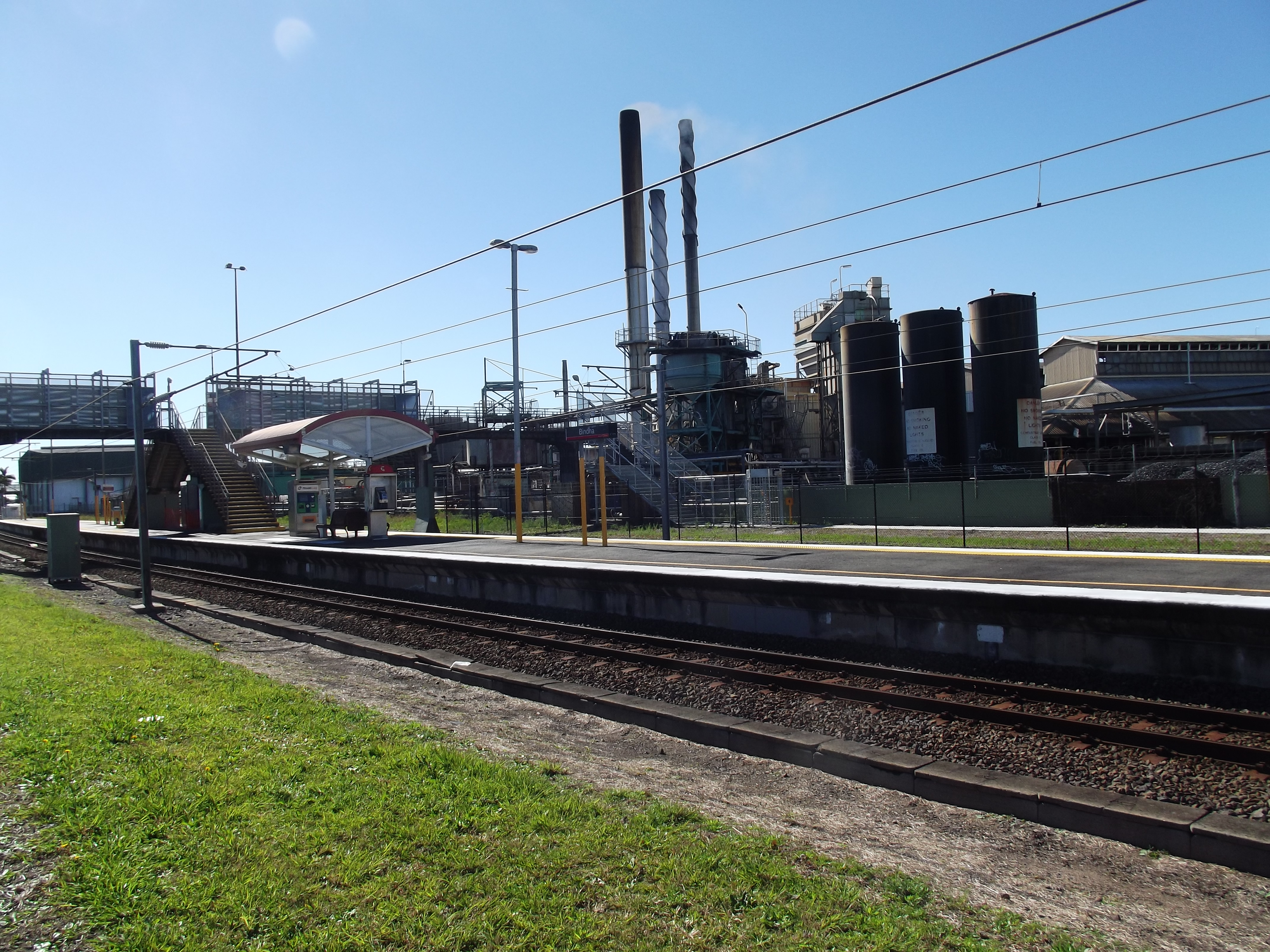
- Northbound view in July 2012

General information
- Location: Northlink Place, Virginia
- Coordinates: 27°22′53″S 153°04′25″E
- Owner: Queensland Rail
- Operator: Queensland Rail
- Line: T4 Shorncliffe
- Distance: 11.06 kilometres from Central
- Platforms: 2 (1 island)
- Tracks: 2

Construction
- Structure type: Ground

Other information
- Status: Unstaffed
- Station code: 600411 (platform 1); 600412 (platform 2)
- Fare zone: Zone 2
- Website: Queensland Rail

Services
Preceding station	Queensland Rail	Following station
Northgate towards Cleveland via Roma Street	T4 Shorncliffe line	Banyo towards Shorncliffe
Location

Bindha is a railway station operated by Queensland Rail on the Shorncliffe line. It opened in 1947 and serves the Brisbane suburb of Virginia. It is a ground level station, featuring one island platform with two faces.

Adjacent to the station is the Golden Circle cannery at Northgate, with the station originally built to provide a stop for the factory workers. Immediately north of the station lies the sidings for the Banyo railway workshops, which closed in 1995, years later reworked for the stabling of up to 4 six-car units.

== Services ==
Bindha station is served by all stops Shorncliffe line services from Shorncliffe to Roma Street, Cannon Hill, Manly and Cleveland.

== Platforms and services ==
Bindha platform arrangement
Platform	Line	Destination	Notes
1	T4 Shorncliffe	Roma Street (to Cleveland line)	
2	T4 Shorncliffe	Shorncliffe	
