= Virginia, Queensland =

Virginia
- Suburb
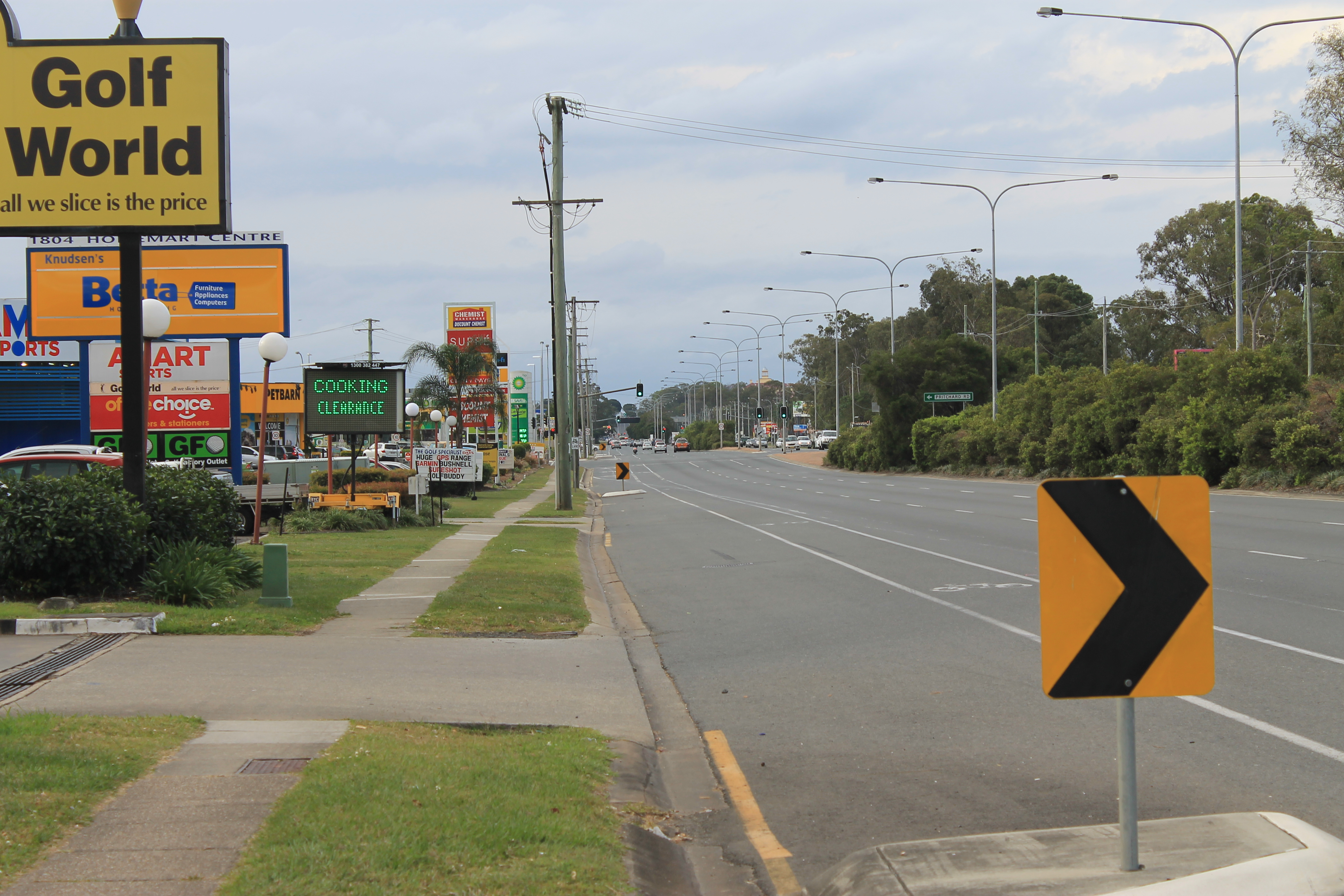
- Sandgate Road, 2014

- Interactive map of Virginia
- Coordinates: 27.3761°S 153.0635°E
- Country: Australia
- State: Queensland
- City: Brisbane
- LGA: City of Brisbane (Deagon Ward and Northgate Ward)
- Location: 14.8 km (9.2 mi) NNE of Brisbane CBD
- Established: 1880s

Government
  - State electorate: Nudgee
  - Federal division: Lilley

Area
  - Total: 3.0 km^{2} (1.2 sq mi)

Population
  - Total: 2,395 (2021 census)
  - Density: 798/km^{2} (2,070/sq mi)
- Time zone: UTC+10:00 (AEST)
- Postcode: 4014
Suburbs around Virginia
Geebung	Boondall	Banyo
Geebung	Virginia	Banyo
Wavell Heights	Nundah	Northgate

Virginia is a northern suburb in the City of Brisbane, Queensland, Australia. In the 2021 census, Virginia had a population of 2,395 people.

== Geography ==
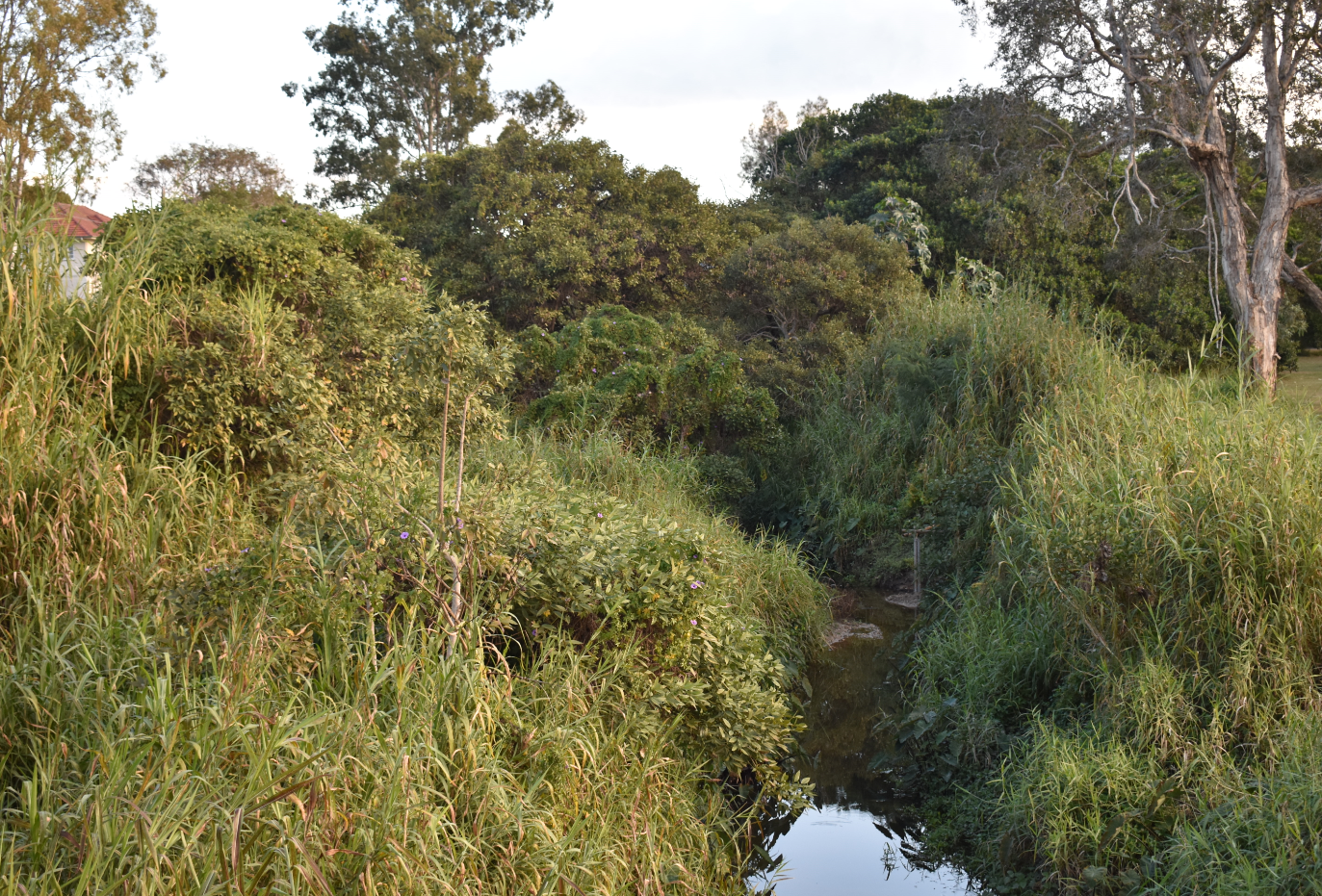
Virginia - Downfall Creek

Virginia is located about 9.8 kilometres (6.1 mi) from the Brisbane central business district (straight line distance), the distance by road is approximately 14.8 kilometres (9.2 mi).

Virginia has a number of parks, including a linear park along Downfall Creek, a recreation reserve. It also contains the much larger Virginia Golf Club, located in nearby Banyo. There are more than 6 parks within the suburb. The majority of parks offer free council facilities such as barbecues (electric and/or wood), playing fields, disabled access, water fountains, and fitness stations. There are two dog parks located on the junction of Geebung, Wavell Heights, and Virginia along Downfall Creek.

== History ==
The suburb is thought to have been named after the U.S. state of Virginia.

Originally occupied mostly by farmlands, Virginia became a district in 1888 with the opening of the North Coast railway line.

A post office was opened in Virginia in 1898.

From the 1890s Virginia began to attract industrial development, including a brick works, a pipe works and other factories.

Virginia State School opened on 2 February 1920.

It was not until the 1950s that Virginia attracted significant residential development.

== Demographics ==
At the 2011 census, Virginia had a population of 2,061 people.

In the 2016 census, Virginia recorded a population of 2,209 people; 50.8% female and 49.2% male. The median age of the Virginia population was 35 years, 3 years below the Australian median. Children aged under 15 years made up 20.3% of the population and people aged 65 years and over made up 10.3% of the population. 75.5% of people living in Virginia were born in Australia, compared to the national average of 66.7%; the next most common countries of birth were New Zealand 4.5%, England 2.9%, India 2.3%, Philippines 1.2%, Nepal 0.6%. 83.2% of people spoke only English at home; the next most popular languages were 1.3% Hindi, 1% Nepali, 1% Punjabi, 0.6% Dutch, 0.6% Mandarin. Virginia's median weekly household income was $2,550, which is higher than Queensland average of $1,222, and higher than Australian average of $1,203.

In the 2021 census, Virginia had a population of 2,395 people.

== Heritage listings ==
Heritage-listed sites in Virginia include:

- 1690 Sandgate Road: Virginia State School

== Education ==
Virginia State School is a government primary (Prep–6) school for boys and girls at 1690 Sandgate Road (27.3838°S 153.0617°E). In 2018, the school had an enrolment of 440 students with 33 teachers (27 full-time equivalent) and 19 non-teaching staff (12 full-time equivalent). It includes a special education program.

There are no secondary schools in Virginia. The nearest government secondary school is Earnshaw State College in neighbouring Banyo to the north-east.

== Amenities ==
Virginia Tongan Church meets at 367 Zillmere Road in Zillmere. It is part of the Wesleyan Methodist Church.

Despite its name, the Virginia Golf Club is located at Elliott Road, Banyo, an adjacent suburb.

== Transport ==
Virginia is connected to Brisbane CBD, the Brisbane Airport, Redcliffe Peninsula, Shorncliffe and Brisbane in general. Two railway lines run through the suburb. Virginia railway station provides Queensland Rail City network services to the CBD, Redcliffe Peninsula and Caboolture. Bindha railway station provides access to regular Queensland Rail City network services to Brisbane and Shorncliffe.

In the 2011 census, 17.4% of employed people travelled to work on public transport and 60.3% by car (either as driver or as passenger).

One of Transport for Brisbane's bus depots is based in Virginia.
