= Virginia State School =

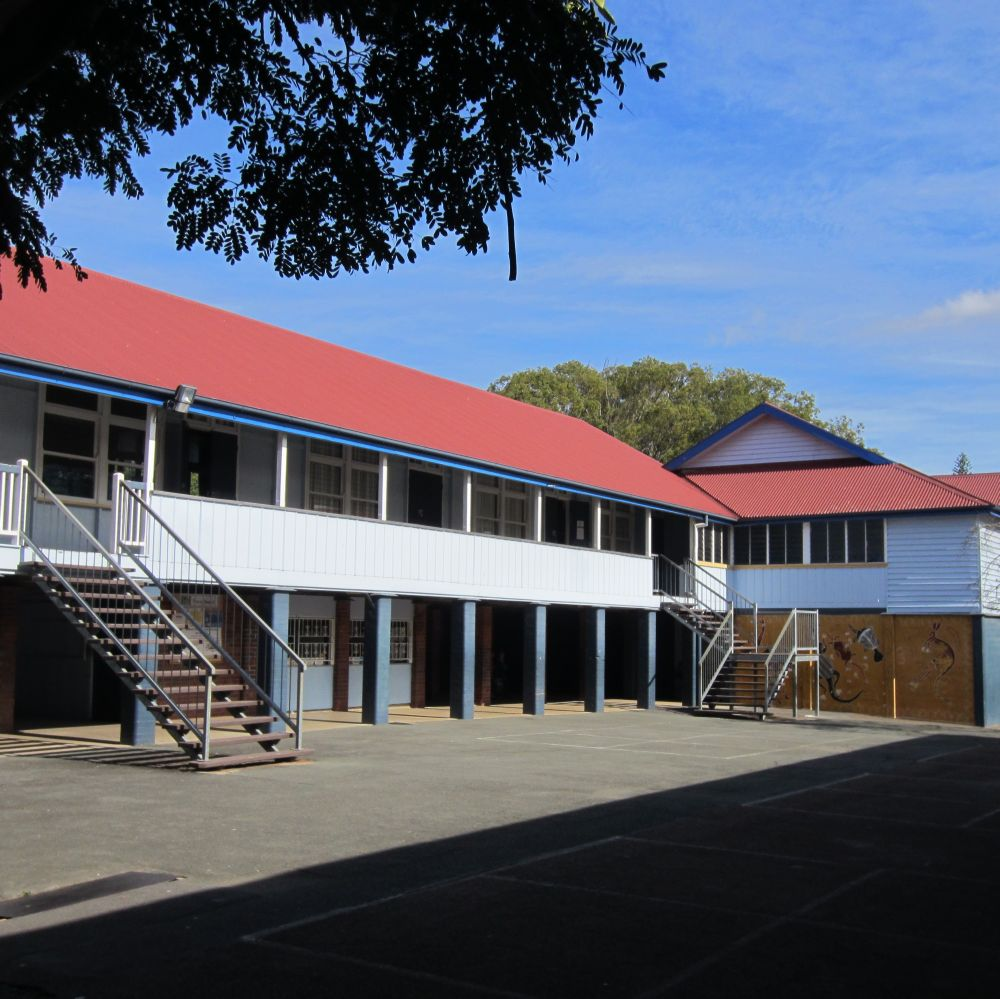
- Blocks C and D from the north-east, 2015

- Location within Queensland
- 27.3828°S 153.0611°E
- Location: 1690 Sandgate Road, Virginia, City of Brisbane, Queensland, Australia

History
- Design period: 1919–1930s (Interwar period)
- Built: 1920–1933 Sectional School Building (comprising 3 wings) – Blocks B, 1920–1987, 1925, 1952–1958

Site notes
- Architect: Queensland Department of Public Works

Queensland Heritage Register
- Official name: Virginia State School
- Type: state heritage
- Designated: 28 August 2015
- Reference no.: 602860
- Type: Education, research, scientific facility: School-state
- Theme: Educating Queenslanders: Providing primary schooling

Virginia State School is a heritage-listed state school at 1690 Sandgate Road, Virginia, City of Brisbane, Queensland, Australia. It was designed by Queensland Department of Public Works and built from 1920 to 1933. It was added to the Queensland Heritage Register on 28 August 2015.

== History ==
Virginia State School opened in 1920 in the northern Brisbane suburb of Virginia to serve the growing population in the area. Due to suburban development during the interwar period and after World War II, extensions were made and buildings added to the site to serve the school's growing pupil numbers. Virginia State School has a highly intact three-wing sectional school building (Blocks B, C and D) that was constructed in five stages between 1920 and 1933, and is set in landscaped grounds with mature shade trees, forestry plots and sporting facilities. The school has been in continuous operation since establishment and has been a focus for the local community as a place for important social and cultural activities.

The provision of state-administered education was important to the colonial governments of Australia. National schools, established in 1848 in New South Wales were continued in Queensland following the colony's creation in 1859. After the introduction of the Education Act 1860, which established the Board of General Education and began standardising curriculum, training and facilities, Queensland's national and public schools grew from four in 1860 to 230 by 1875. The State Education Act 1875 provided for free, compulsory and secular primary education and established the Department of Public Instruction. This further standardised the provision of education, and despite difficulties, achieved the remarkable feat of bringing basic literacy to most Queensland children by 1900.

The establishment of schools was considered an essential step in the development of communities and integral to their success. Locals often donated land and labour for a school's construction and the school community contributed to maintenance and development. Schools became a community focus, a symbol of progress, and a source of pride, with enduring connections formed with past pupils, parents and teachers. The inclusion of war memorials and community halls reinforced these connections and provided a venue for a wide range of community events in schools across Queensland.

To help ensure consistency and economy, the Queensland Government developed standard plans for its school buildings. From the 1860s until the 1960s, Queensland school buildings were predominantly timber-framed, an easy and cost-effective approach that also enabled the government to provide facilities in remote areas. Standard designs were continually refined in response to changing needs and educational philosophy and Queensland school buildings were particularly innovative in climate control, lighting and ventilation. Standardisation produced distinctly similar schools across Queensland with complexes of typical components.

Originally the land of the Turrbul people, the land in the vicinity of the later Virginia State School was surveyed in 1864 and country portions sold by 1878. The area became known as "Virginia" after the opening of the Virginia railway station on the North Coast railway line in 1888. The railway made the area more accessible and stimulated growth. The Virginia Brick Company was established nearby about 1892. Between the 1890s and 1910s a small village formed around the railway station and by 1911 the area's population was 167.

The community petitioned the Department of Public Instruction in 1909–10 for the opening of a state school at Virginia and by 1915 a plan of the area showed a school reserve on the site of a former recreation reserve. In 1918 the Minister for Public Instruction advised that the new school at Virginia would proceed and that its estimated cost was £3000. The Queensland Government subsequently approved expenditure of £1,784 on establishing the school. In January 1920 The Queenslander reported that the new state school at Virginia was nearing completion. The previously gazetted school reserve (R1066) was increased in size to 8 acres 31.5 perches (3.37ha) through the inclusion of land to the south and west of the initial reserve, after closure of a road leading to the adjacent Virginia Brickworks.

The school was opened by the Minister for Public Instruction on 31 January 1920 and teaching commenced on 2 February. It consisted of a highset, three-classroom, sectional school building running approximately east–west, with a north-facing verandah and a teachers room centrally positioned off the verandah (this building is the eastern end of the current Block B). Stairs to the east of the teachers room gave access to the verandah, and the base of the verandah wall had operable ventilation boards. The final cost according to the Department of Public Works was £2276 2 shillings (s) 10 pence (p).

Attention to improving light and ventilation to achieve an optimum classroom culminated in 1920 with the Sectional School (type DT/1), a high-set timber structure. This fundamentally new design combined all the best features of previous types and implemented theories of an ideal education environment. It proved very successful and was used unaltered until 1950. This type was practical, economical, satisfied educational requirements and climatic needs and allowed for the orderly expansion of schools over time.

Before the sectional school, all school buildings were generally aligned with street and property boundaries, regardless of aspect. By late 1914, after acceptance of the principles and virtues of providing natural light into classrooms advocated by Eleanor Bourne, (appointed as the first Medical Inspector of Schools in 1911), buildings were being preferably orientated to receive maximum indirect southern light. The sectional school type was designed to have an unobstructed wall of windows on its southern elevation and verandahs, typically to the north but sometimes to the end elevations, allowing for linkages to other and future buildings. Its blank end walls were also detailed to be removable, so that as the school grew, the building could be easily extended in sections, hence the name. This led to the construction of long narrow buildings of many classrooms - a distinctive feature of Queensland schools.

At Virginia State School, rapid growth in student numbers over the next 12 years resulted in four additions, constructed to the west of the original sectional school building, and ultimately forming three connected wings. Pupil numbers in the first two years grew from 165 at opening to 252 by December 1921 resulting in the first enlargement of the school in 1922. Two classrooms were added to the western end of the sectional school building (the classrooms now form the western end of Block B) at a cost of £1,271 9s. However, by June 1923 a deputation from Virginia State School was requesting the Minister for Public Instruction to duplicate the existing accommodation, provide a retiring room for the female teachers, and to board-in parts of the school's understorey.

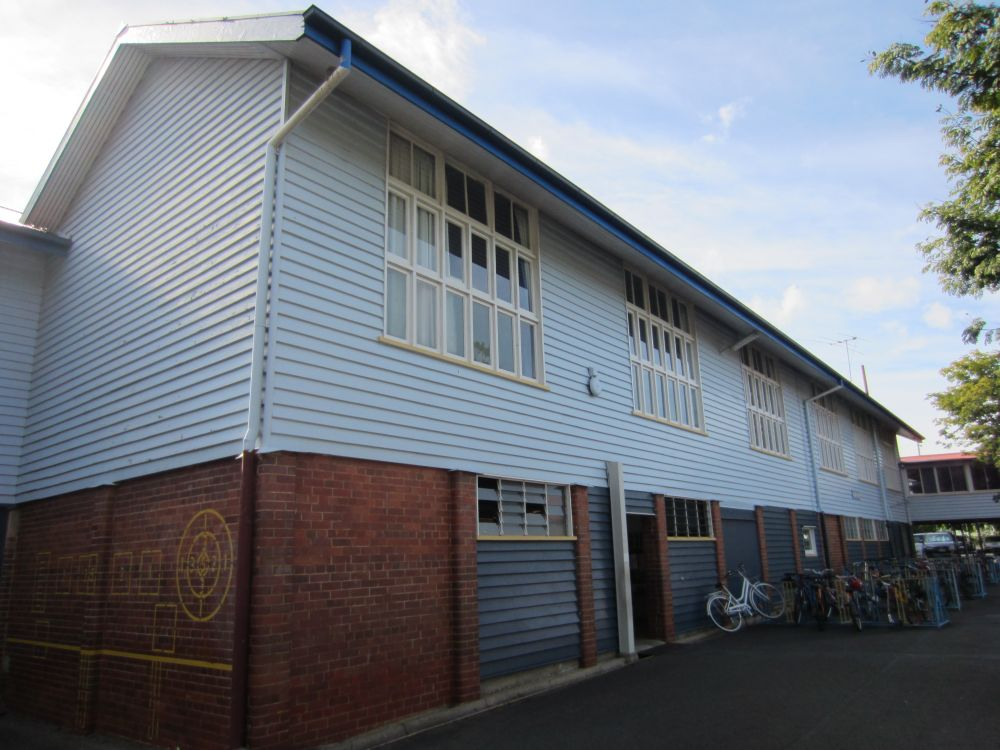
Block C from south-west, 2015

Before any action was taken, disaster struck in January 1924 when a severe storm blew the school building off its brick piers and almost split it in half. The Department of Public Works dismantled, re-erected and enlarged the building at a cost of £4110 12s 3p. The reconstructed and extended building was re-positioned away from the boundaries and did not address the street. Instead, its verandahs were oriented to the northeast. The additions consisted of a three-classroom wing (now forming the eastern end of Block C) attached via a verandah from the western side of the earlier wing, and linked to the northeastern verandah of the new wing. A second teachers room was also added to the 1922 classroom wing and a stairway added beside it. The verandah corners were enclosed to form hat rooms.

The student population at Virginia State School continued to grow and further additions were made to the school. In May 1926 the School Committee approached the Department of Public Instruction for increased accommodation, but additions to the school were not approved until August 1927. By then the school's enrolment figure was 530 and there was only accommodation for 320 pupils. In the meantime children were taught on the verandahs and under the school building. The then western wing (current Block C) was extended by three classrooms and an additional staircase in 1927–28. The new classrooms were separated by timber partitions.

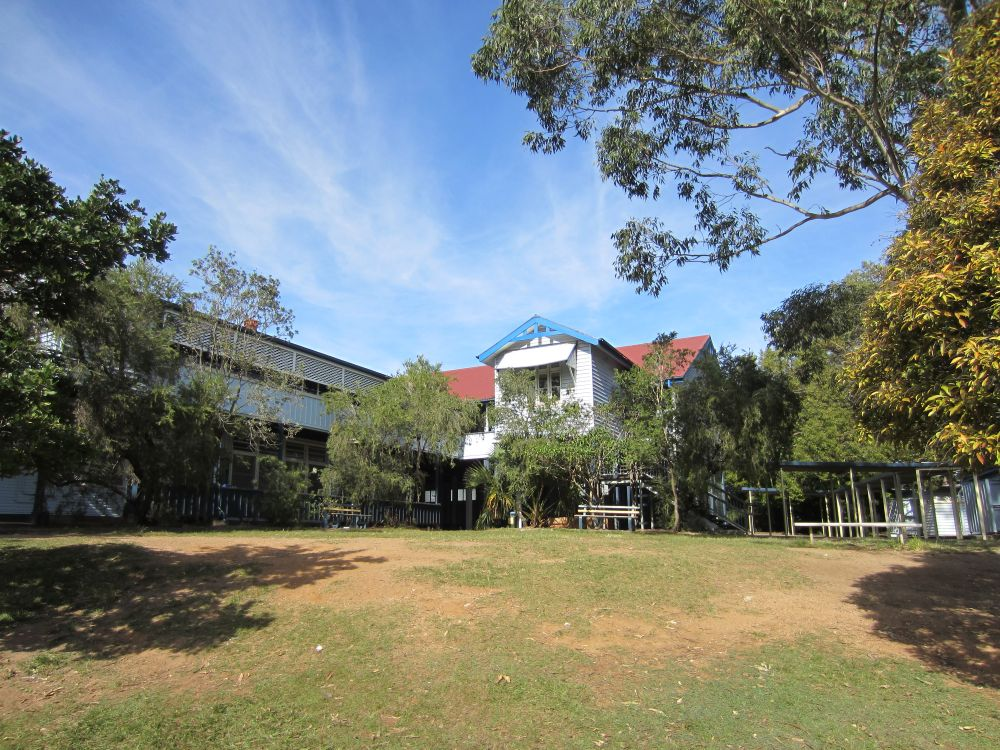
Block D, teachers rooms, from north-west, 2015

The most westerly wing (current Block D) was added in 1933 at a cost of £1781 10s 8p, and opened on 1 July 1933 by Frank Cooper, the Minister for Public Instruction. This wing was connected by verandah to the northwestern end of the 1927–28 additions, making the building more symmetrical. Erected on high concrete piers, the area underneath was concreted. This wing (a Sectional School) comprised four classrooms, each 21 by 18 feet (6.4 by 5.5 m); two teachers rooms off its northern verandah, both 15 by 12 feet (4.6 by 3.7 m); and a staircase near the northwestern corner. The classrooms were lined with tongue and groove timber boarding, and were divided by fixed timber partitions with central connecting double doors. Their ceilings were coved, with metal tie rods and latticed ceiling vents. This wing provided additional accommodation for 160 pupils, which, together with the existing classrooms, accommodated a total of 560 pupils. Provision was made for an additional room for 40 pupils, which would have made the building symmetrical; but this was never built.

An important component of Queensland state schools was their grounds. The early and continuing commitment to play-based education, particularly in primary school, resulted in the provision of outdoor play space and sporting facilities, such as ovals and tennis courts. Also, trees and gardens were planted to shade and beautify schools. In the 1870s, schools inspector William Boyd was critical of tropical schools and amongst his recommendations stressed the importance of the adding shade trees to playgrounds. Subsequently, Arbor Day celebrations began in Queensland in 1890. Aesthetically designed gardens were encouraged by regional inspectors, and educators believed gardening and Arbor Days instilled in young minds the value of hard work and activity, improved classroom discipline and developed aesthetic tastes.

From the 1920s, the Virginia State School community implemented plans to improve the school's grounds. Arbor Day plantings were undertaken in the 1920s and trees were planted on the Sandgate Road boundary at that time. In April 1925 a tennis court, located in the southwestern corner of the grounds was completed. In the following year, further work on the tennis court and grounds was undertaken by community members during a working bee. In 1926, the school committee supplied trees for Arbor Day planting and decided to approach the Department of Public Instruction for materials to construct seats under those shade trees large enough to warrant seats. In the next year, the school committee instituted a grounds improvement fund to finance improvements, while in May 1930, it decided to repair the tennis court and proceed with other improvements to the grounds. Subsequently, the committee held a balloon carnival in October 1930 to raise funds to improve and beautify the school grounds. Drainage work to the "cricket pitch area" was also undertaken in 1930.

After World War II, the Department of Public Instruction was largely unprepared for the enormous demand for state education that began in the late 1940s and continued well into the 1960s. This was a nationwide occurrence resulting from the unprecedented population growth now termed the "baby boom". Queensland schools were overcrowded and, to cope, many new buildings were constructed and existing buildings were extended.

At Virginia State School, increased student numbers resulted in a number of buildings being added to the site during the 1950s; some of which were connected to the sectional school building, resulting in modifications. Block A, containing three classrooms, was constructed as a northern extension to Block B in 1953. In July 1957, Block E was constructed as a highset, two-classroom building with an understorey play area. Its east-facing classrooms were accessed from a western verandah, which connected to Block D. Consequently, the eastern teachers room of Block D was altered, with its northeastern windows moved to the northwestern wall and new windows added to either side of the original window in the southeastern wall.

In 1958 alterations to Blocks B, C and D took place. After Block A burnt down in 1957, it was rebuilt in the following year as a highset building with a verandah to the west giving access to the three east facing classrooms of Block B. The eastern teachers room of Block B was rebuilt to the original dimensions with new hopper windows to the east and a double-hung sash to the west. The high-level windows in the verandah wall were removed from Blocks B and C and replaced with three double-hung sashes with fanlights. In the verandah wall of Block D, the number of windows was increased from one to three. To the three eastern classrooms of Block B, a flat suspended ceiling was installed. Glazed screens replaced a store room at the eastern end of the verandah of Block B and a storage space was added under the western teachers room.

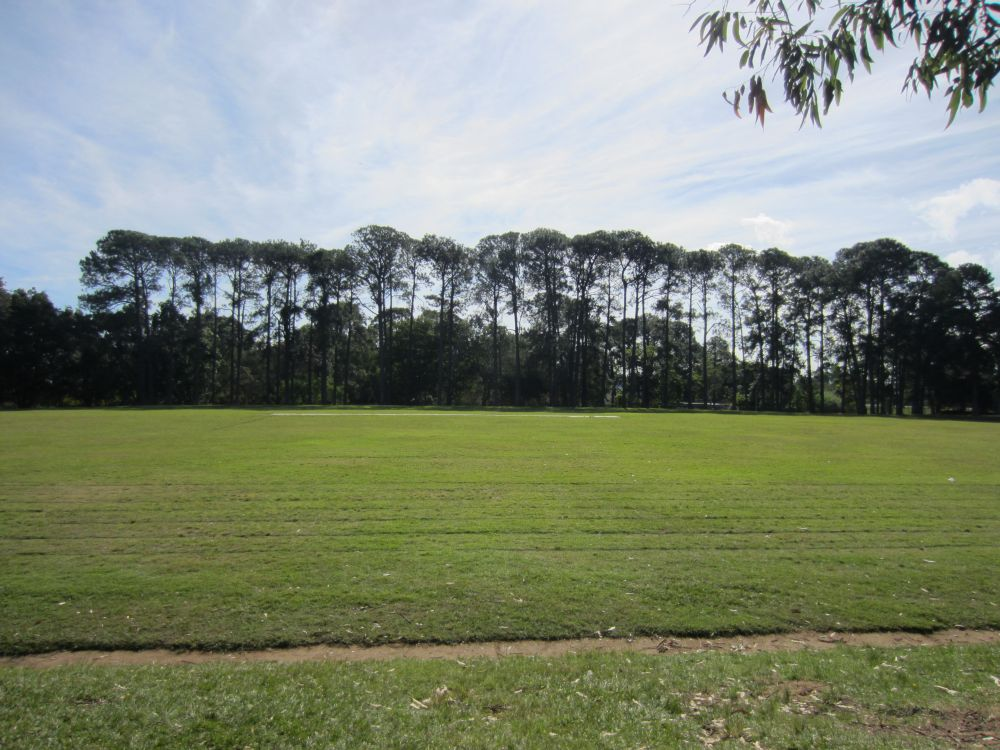
View across the oval, 2015

After World War II, further improvements to the school grounds were undertaken. By 1958, a second tennis court had been added. Rows of pine trees to the north of the oval date from the 1950s. In 1959, the school grounds were enlarged to 12 acres 1 rood 13 perches (4.99ha) with the addition of 3 acres 6.5 perches (1.23ha) to the north and west of the school site; despite excision of land to the east to widen Sandgate Road. The school's swimming pool was built in the mid-1960s.

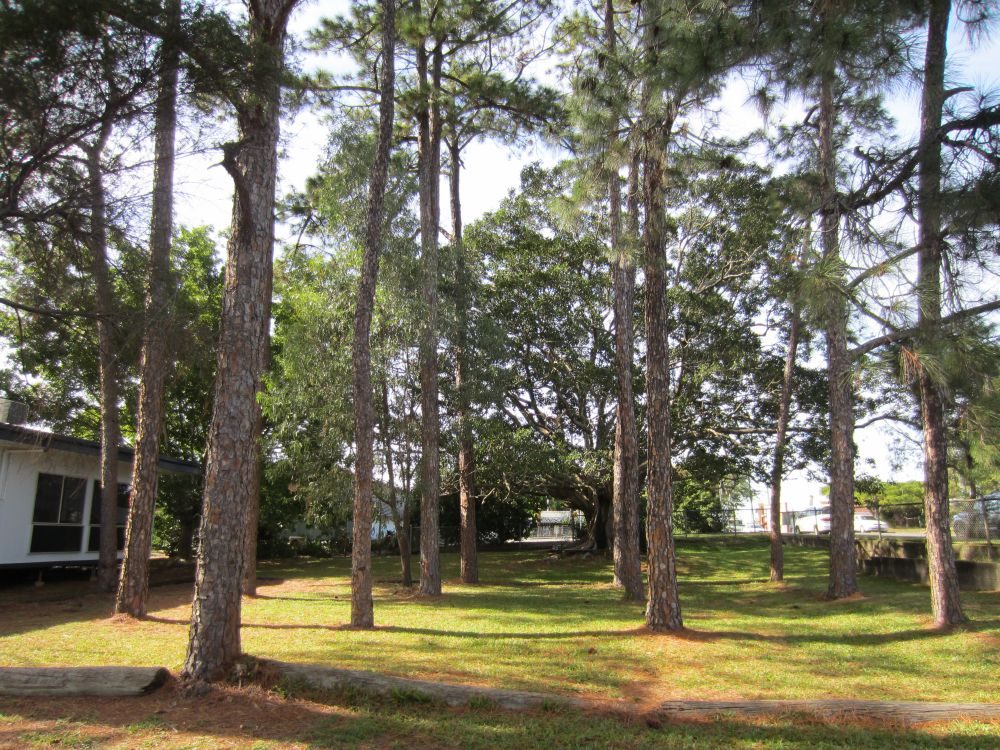
Forestry plot, 2015

As at 2015, the school grounds retain three distinct forestry plots to the north and east of the tennis courts and along the northern edge of the sports oval. Forestry plots were the product of after-school agricultural clubs, introduced in 1923 at primary schools, under the "home project" scheme. Curriculum driven, these clubs had a secondary commercial value as well as disseminating information and helping to develop a range of skills. The Department of Primary Industry provided suitable plants and offered horticultural advice. School forestry plots were seen by the government as a way of educating the next generation about the economic and environmental importance of trees, as well as providing testing grounds for new species. Located throughout the state, the plots were a means of experimenting with a variety of tree species in different soil and climatic conditions. The sale of timber grown in school plots provided an additional source of income for the school and the plots themselves were an attractive feature of school grounds. The first school forestry plot was established at Marburg State Rural School in 1928, where 275 exotic and indigenous trees were planted. Encouraged by the Education and Forestry Departments, by 1953 about 380 Queensland schools were undertaking forestry projects. A forestry plot at Virginia State School was established by 1952, at which time it included pine and cypress trees planted.

As at 2015, the school continues to operate from its original site. It retains the Department of Public Works sectional school building set in landscaped grounds with tennis courts, sports oval, mature shade trees and forestry plots. The school is important to the area, having been a focus for the community, and generations of students have been taught there. Since establishment, Virginia State School has been a key social focus for its community with the grounds and buildings having been the location of many social events.

== Description ==
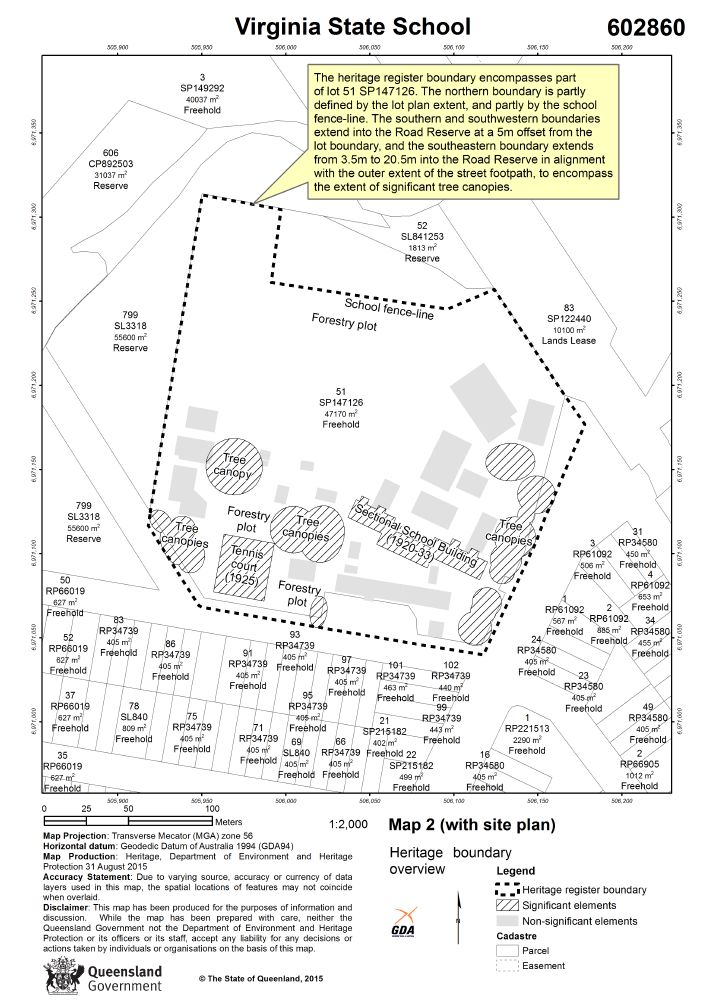
Site plan, 2015

Virginia State School occupies the whole of a levelled, 4.72ha block within Virginia, an industrial and residential suburb of northern Brisbane. The site is located on the corner of Sandgate Road, the major thoroughfare through Virginia, and Jefferis Street; and is bound by Brickyard Road to the southwest, parkland to the west and north, and the North Coast railway line to the northeast. The school buildings are primarily located at the southern end of the site with the earliest, a sectional school building, approximately in the centre of the group. The school complex also includes a sports oval at the northern end of the site, a tennis court (1925) in the southwestern corner, and a variety of mature trees and plantings that are mostly positioned along the site boundary, sports oval perimeter, and north and east of the tennis court. The school and its large, leafy grounds are conspicuous in their suburban setting.

=== 1920–1933 sectional school building (Blocks B, C and D) ===
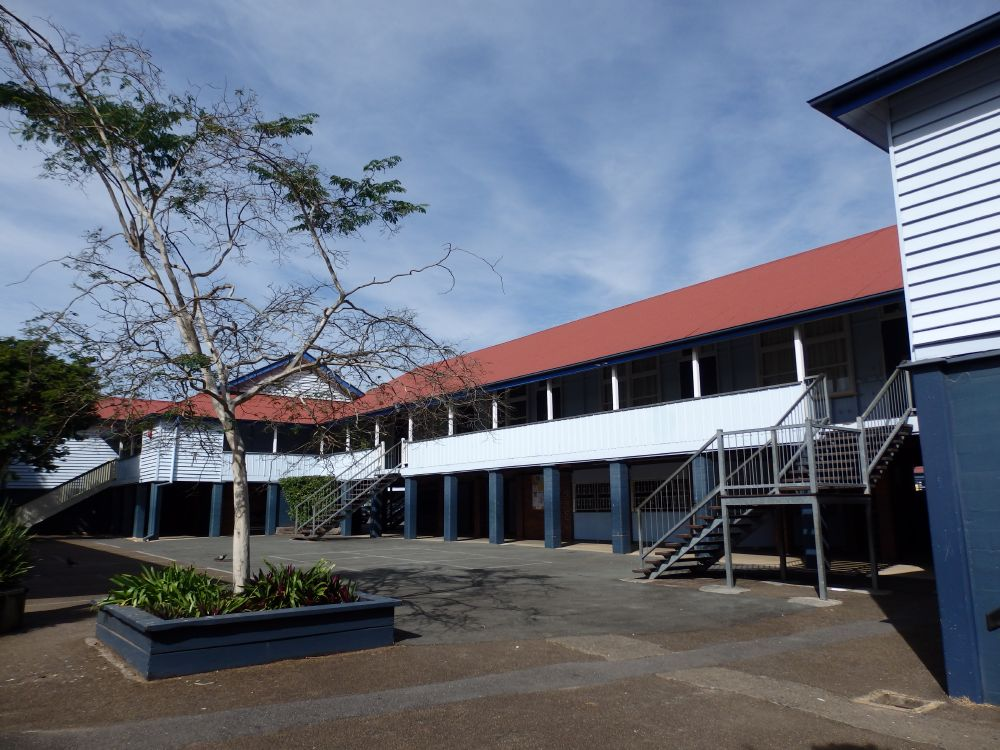
Blocks B and C, 2015

The sectional school building is set well back from Jefferis street and is orientated on a southeast–northwest axis - perpendicular to Sandgate Road. It consists of three Sectional School wings (Block B, east; Block C, centre; and Block D, west) that were constructed in five stages between 1920 and 1933.

The building is a highset, timber-framed and weatherboard-clad structure with corrugated metal-clad roofs, timber floors, and tall, rounded-brick (Block B and C) and concrete (Block D) stumps. The building's three wings are linked by northeast-facing verandahs which are accessed by timber stairs; and teachers rooms are attached to the verandahs of the east and west wings. The understorey is partially enclosed with a variety of brick, flat-sheet and weatherboard-clad partitions that form toilet blocks, a tuckshop, storage areas and additional classrooms – none of which are of cultural heritage significance. A range of early timber joinery is retained throughout the building including the large banks of casement windows with horizontally centre-pivoting fanlights in the southwestern walls (fanlights in the eastern block are modern); and double-hung sashes with centre-pivoting fanlights in the verandah walls (installed in the 1950s). Most doors are modern, but retain early centre-pivoting fanlights.

All verandah walls are single-skin, with tongue-and-groove (T&G), vertically jointed (VJ) timber board linings and externally-exposed stud-framing. The verandahs have square timber posts and raked ceilings lined in T&G, VJ boards. Bag-racks have replaced most of the timber balustrading.

Early interior wall and ceiling linings are T&G, VJ boards. Original coved ceilings survive in most classrooms; and exposed metal tie rods and square ceiling ventilation panels are retained in these spaces. Skirtings are timber and of a simple profile. The eastern and the western wings each have two teachers rooms; most of which retain their original coved ceilings and T&G, VJ board wall and ceiling linings. Their early casement windows with centre-pivoting (eastern wing), awning and fixed (western wing) fanlights survive and some retain early window hardware. Marks within some northeastern wall linings indicate the former locations of window banks (now removed).

Extensions northeast of the sectional school building, Block A and Block E, and alterations to accommodate the southeast walkway linking to Block F, are not of cultural heritage significance.

==== 1920–1922 Eastern Wing (Block B) ====
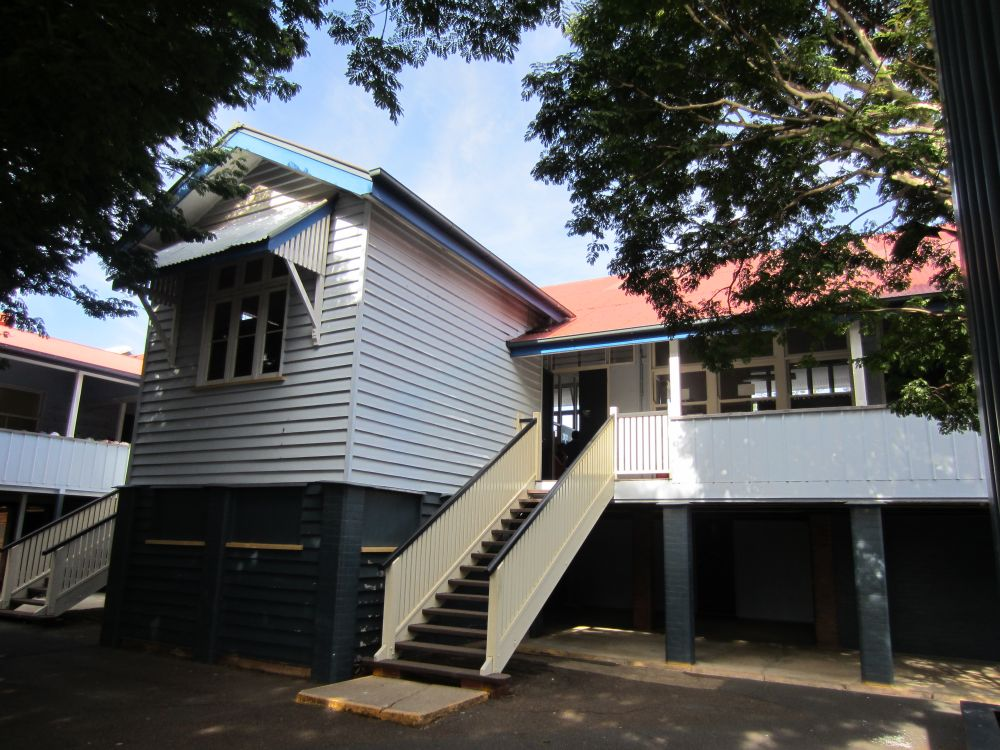
Block B, teachers room, 2015

The eastern wing has a gable roof with a Dutch-gable at the western end and flat-sheet eaves linings. The southeastern end-wall features a bank of high-level, centre-pivoting windows that are sheltered by a wide, corrugated metal-clad hood with decorative timber brackets. An early, low-waisted timber door provides access from the verandah to the easternmost classroom and retains some early door hardware. The lowest board of the classrooms' verandah wall is hinged at the base. The verandah has modern enclosures at either end that form additional classroom and storage spaces.

Internally the wing is divided by timber partitions into three large classroom spaces (formerly five classrooms). Two original partitions at the eastern end of the wing have been removed, although their locations are identifiable through protruding marks in the flat, suspended ceiling lining. Partitions at the western end of the wing remain in their original locations, although they have been lined with flat-sheeting from floor to wall height. An opening has been cut into the westernmost partition to combine two classrooms into one large space.

==== 1924–1928 Central Wing (Block C) ====
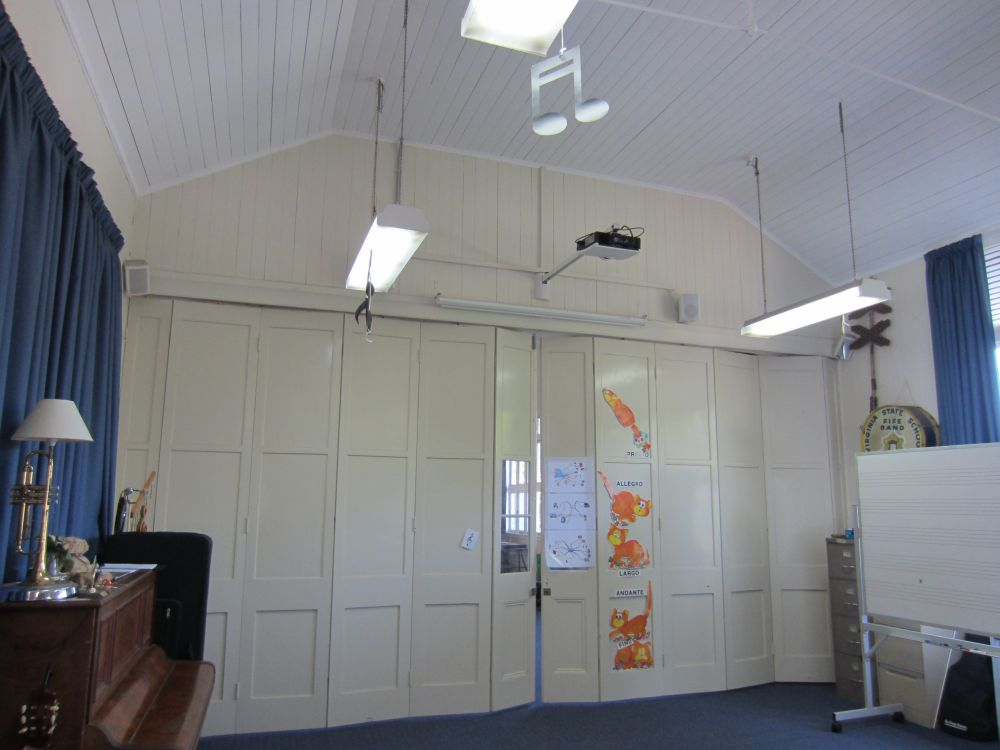
Classroom in Block C with folding doors, 2015

The central wing has a gable roof with battened timber eaves linings ventilating the roof-space. Its southeastern gable-end features a bank of high-level, centre-pivoting windows; sheltered by a wide, corrugated metal-clad hood with decorative timber brackets. The verandah has been partially enclosed by modern louvres at the inner junction of the central and western wings.

The interior is divided into three spaces: an eastern classroom; a western classroom; and a large, central performance space. Remnants of the original partitions survive as bulkheads in the western classroom and the central performance space, demonstrating the original six-room layout. Early, low-waisted, timber folding doors with central glass insets divide the western classroom and central performance space - the retention of these doors is rare. Aligned with a remnant partition bulkhead, east of the folding doors, are hinge marks in the wall lining that indicate the position of an additional set of folding doors (now removed).

==== 1933 Western Wing (Block D) ====
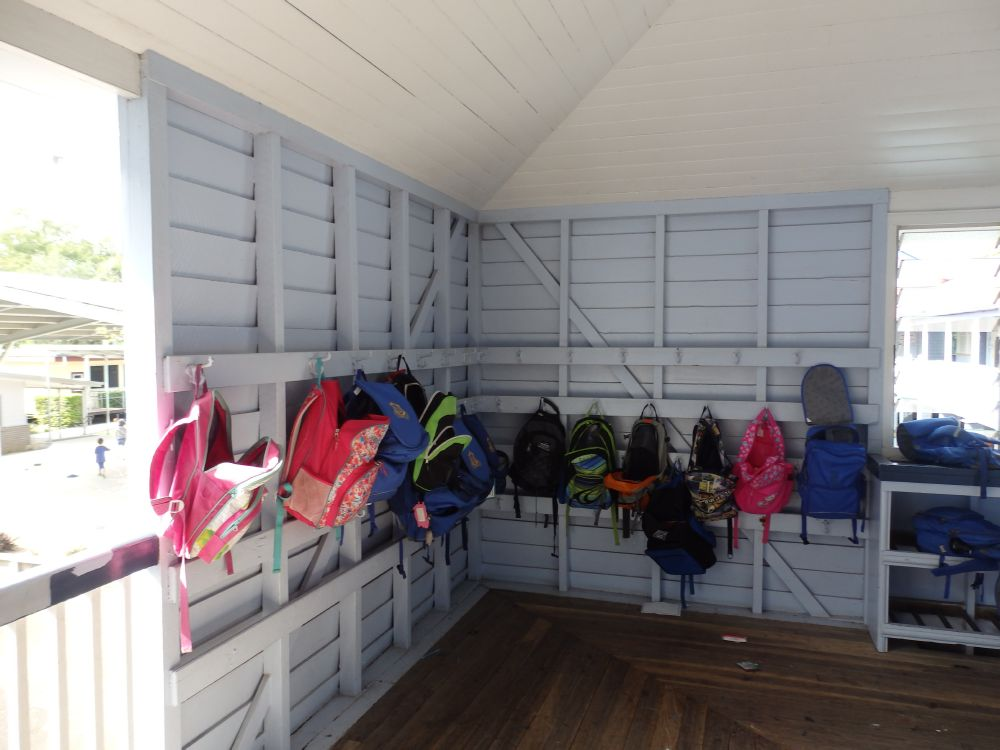
Verandah, Block D, 2015

The western wing has a gable roof, with an southeastern Dutch-gable and VJ timber board eaves linings. The northwestern gable-end and the western teachers room gable-end have timber battening.

The verandah retains an early hatroom enclosure at the southeastern end, with exposed timber framing and metal hooks. The northwestern end is enclosed with a weatherboard-clad, single-skin wall that houses casement windows.

The interior is divided into three classroom spaces. The partitions have been moved from their original locations, although timber lattice ceiling vents and window locations in the southwestern wall are indicative of the early four-room layout.

=== Landscape Elements / Grounds ===
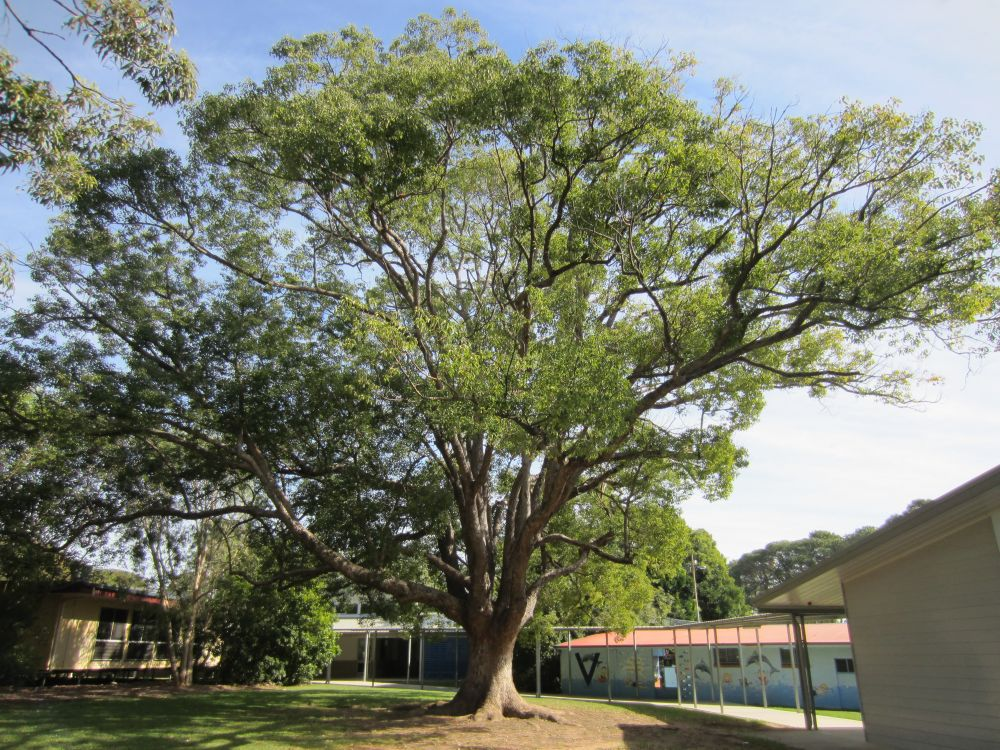
Camphor laurel behind pool, 2015

The grounds are with many trees including figs (Ficus spp.), camphor laurels (Cinnamomum camphora), slash pines (Pinus elliottii), tipuanas (Tipuana tipu), poincianas (Delonix regia) and paper-bark tea-trees (Melaleuca quinquenervia).

A tennis court is located in its original position in the southwestern corner of the site.

Forestry plots are located along the northern edge of the sports oval (established by 1952), and north and east of the tennis court (established by 1958). In each of these locations, slash pine trees are planted in uniform rows; those east of the tennis court are bounded by timber log seating.

The school grounds are beautified by mature perimeter trees, planted along the Sandgate Road and Brickyard Road boundaries. A large fig tree on the Jefferis Street boundary, east of the tennis court, is encircled by timber seating.

Mature shade trees are planted in various places throughout the school site. Particularly large camphor laurel specimens are located north of Block B and north of the tennis court; and a mature Hong Kong orchid tree (Bauhina sp.) is east of the tennis court.

A plaque commemorating the opening of the school is positioned north of the sectional school building.

== Heritage listing ==
Virginia State School was listed on the Queensland Heritage Register on 28 August 2015 having satisfied the following criteria.

The place is important in demonstrating the evolution or pattern of Queensland's history.

Virginia State School (established in 1920) is important in demonstrating the evolution of state education and its associated architecture in Queensland. The place retains an excellent, representative example of a standard government designed school building that was an architectural response to prevailing government educational philosophies.

The sectional school building, comprising three wings (1920–33), is important in demonstrating the evolution of Department of Public Works (DPW) timber school designs to provide adequate lighting and ventilation; equally recognising educational and climatic needs.

The large suburban site with mature trees, landscaping features and sporting facilities demonstrates the Queensland education system's recognition of the importance of play and aesthetics in the education of children.

The place is important in demonstrating the principal characteristics of a particular class of cultural places.

Virginia State School is important in demonstrating the principal characteristics of a Queensland state school with later modifications. This includes a highset timber-framed teaching building of a standard design that incorporates understorey play areas, verandahs, and classrooms with high levels of natural light and ventilation; on a generous, landscaped site with mature shade trees, play areas and sporting facilities.

The sectional school building (1920–33) designed by the Department of Public Works is very intact and is important in demonstrating the principal characteristics of this type and its evolutions. Characteristics include its highset form with play space beneath, gable and Dutch-gable roofs, blank end walls, northern verandahs, large banks of south-facing windows, projecting teachers rooms, hat-room enclosures, single-skin verandah walls, early joinery, coved ceilings and early internal linings.

The forestry plots at Virginia are good examples of their type, containing pine trees (Pinus spp.) planted in uniform rows.

The mature camphor laurels (Cinnamomum camphora), tipuanas (Tipuana tipu), poincianas (Delonix regia), paper-bark tea-trees (Melaleuca quinquenervia), and fig trees (Ficus spp.) are fine examples of shade trees typically planted in Queensland school grounds.

The place has a strong or special association with a particular community or cultural group for social, cultural or spiritual reasons.

Schools have always played an important part in Queensland communities. They typically retain significant and enduring connections with former pupils, parents, and teachers; provide a venue for social interaction and volunteer work; and are a source of pride, symbolising local progress and aspirations.

Virginia State School has a strong and ongoing association with the Virginia community. It was established in 1920 through the fundraising efforts of the local community and generations of Virginia children have been taught there. The place is important for its contribution to the educational development of its suburban district and is a prominent community focal point and gathering place for social and commemorative events with widespread community support.

== Notable students ==
- Des Frawley, Member of the Queensland Legislative Assembly
- Tim Harris, Roman Catholic Bishop of Townsville

== See also ==
- History of state education in Queensland
- List of schools in Greater Brisbane
