= Virginia Golf Club =

Golf course in Brisbane, Australia

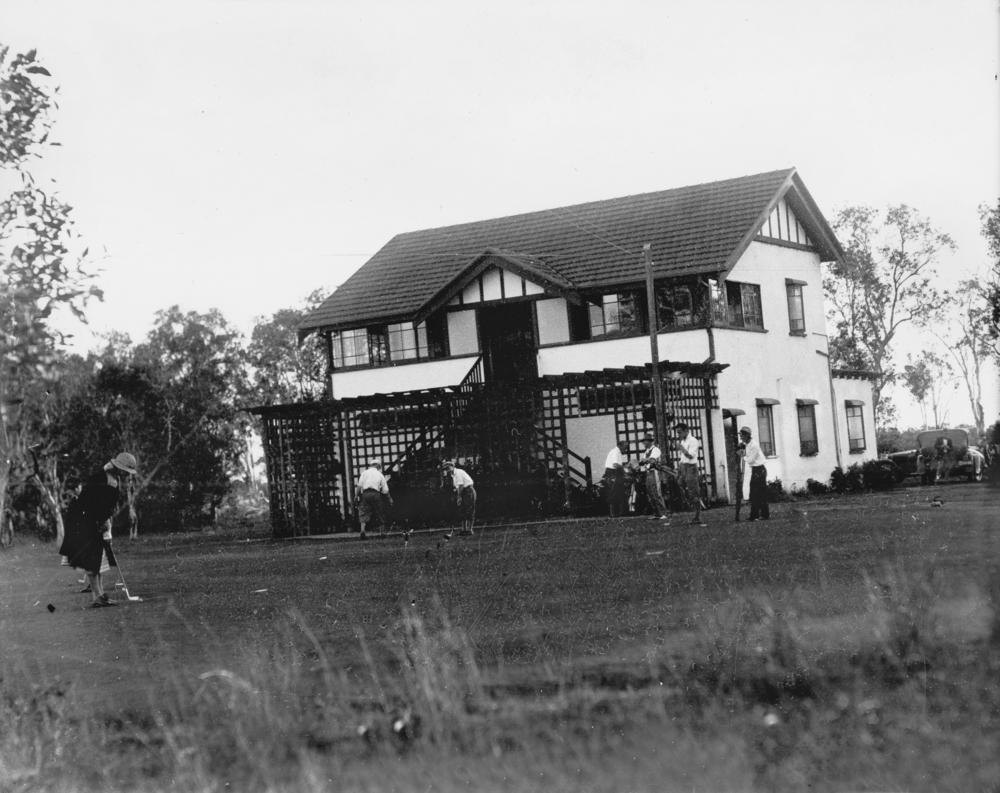
- Virginia Golf Club, Brisbane, 1932

- Location in Queensland
- 27.37373°S 153.06681°E

Club information
- Location: Brisbane, Queensland
- Established: 1929
- Type: Semi-private
- Tota holes: 27
- Greens: Tifgreen 328 Bermuda
- Fairways: Common couch
- Website: http://www.virginiagolf.com.au

Championship Course
- Designed by: Al Howard and Norman Von Nida
- Par: 71 (blue tees)
- Length: 6,689 yards (6,116 m)
- Course rating: 73
- Slope rating: 121

Virginia Golf Club is a golf course located in Brisbane, Australia. The Club boasts a 27-hole golf course and Clubhouse. In 2013 Virginia Golf Club celebrated its 85-year anniversary and underscored its place as one of Queensland's oldest and most time honoured courses. Two of its Club Champions from the 1970s would later win major championships – Greg Norman and Wayne Grady.

== History ==
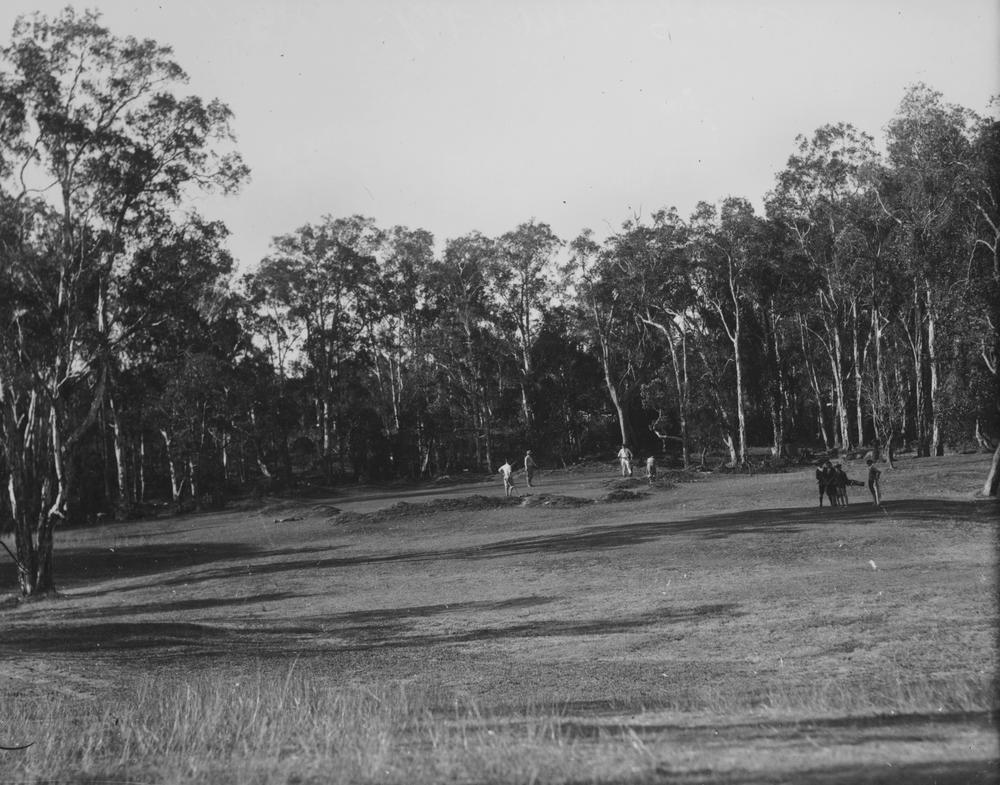
Golfers at Virginia Golf Club, 1933

In 1928, the Chief Engineer for the Queensland Main Roads Commission, D.A. Crawford, designed a nine-hole golf course on public land at Virginia. Brothers Jack and Bert Roach were contracted to clear the area of unwanted trees, shrubs and heavy undergrowth. Their only tools were axes, shovels, a plough, and a horse and cart. Volunteers helped clear weeds and build the tees and greens. The course was playable by the end of October 1929 and was officially opened by the Lord Mayor of Brisbane, William Jolly on Saturday 6 December 1930.

A second nine-hole course was designed by D. A. Crawford and opened on Saturday 2 September 1933.

In December 1946, 15-year-old caddie, Leo Lofthouse, won the Courier Mail's Caddies' Cup at Virginia. Not only was his round of 71 a record for amateurs on the course, it was also a better score than any professional who played the course that year.

The Club acquired an additional 72 acres of freehold land for the sum of £7,250 in June 1959. The land was purchased by Jim Wilson, a Club member, as it was felt that the original owner of the land would not sell directly to the Club. Wilson took control of the land in April 1958 and subsequently transferred title to the Virginia Golf Club.

The new land was cleared during 1963 with Al Howard, a course architect from Sydney, and Norman Von Nida, a three-time Australian Open champion, appointed to design a 27-hole layout. The current clubhouse was opened by the Lord Mayor of Brisbane, Clem Jones, in September 1969 and the redesign of the course was fully complete by October 1970. Aside from a few small changes to the third nine which were made in 1992, this layout is still used today.

Between 1980 and 1988, the Club converted its greens from couch grass to Tifgreen 328 Bermuda. The grass was chosen because of its fairer putting surface and its long wearing qualities that could cope with a sub-tropical climate.

In 2012, Wayne Grady Golf Design was appointed to redesign the current layout. These changes are expected to be made gradually over the next 20 years.

== Notable members ==
- Wayne Grady
- Greg Norman
- Andrew Buckle

== Scorecard ==
	Rating/slope	1	2	3	4	5	6	7	8	9	Out	10	11	12	13	14	15	16	17	18	In	Total
Par	Men’s	5	4	3	4	4	4	4	4	3	35	4	4	3	5	3	4	5	4	4	36	71
Blue	73/121	492	383	168	327	352	412	377	355	184	3050	313	328	135	444	161	375	523	400	388	3067	6117
White	72/119	483	366	162	321	339	399	354	348	178	2950	306	320	130	431	137	364	514	387	387	2976	5926
Handicap	Men’s	13	3	11	17	5	1	7	15	9		10	16	18	14	8	2	12	4	6		
Par	Women’s	5	4	3	4	4	5	4	4	3	36	4	4	3	5	3	4	5	4	5	37	73
Red	74/125	434	320	157	319	340	393	339	335	171	2808	205	308	126	403	135	312	411	367	387	2654	5462
Handicap	Women’s	6	9	12	10	2	15	3	8	16		18	7	17	4	13	5	11	1	14		
