= Bernard Flewell-Smith =

Bernard Flewell-Smith CBE (1898–1992) was an Australian fruit grower and soldier. He was one of the leaders in developing the Golden Circle fruit cannery in Northgate, Brisbane, Queensland. Son of farmer, John Francis Flewell-Smith, and Frances Maude, née Stephens, Flewell-Smith was born in Lowood on 4 March 1898. Throwing away his desire to work in medicine, Flewell-Smith overtook his father's farm when he left for the war. He later began fruit farming in Bracken Ridge after returning to Australia. In 1935 he was appointed as manager of the Committee of Direction of Fruit Marketing, succeeding W. Ranger. He previously held a position as a scholar at Ipswich Boys' Grammar School, the same school where he studied and was awarded the prize for best Junior pass in the state. In 1950 Flewell-Smith was elected as Citizen of the Week by the Brisbane Telegraph.

In 1921 Flewell-Smith married Mary Darling. They had three children, two daughters and a son.
