= Percy Savage =

Australian fashion publicist (1926–2008)

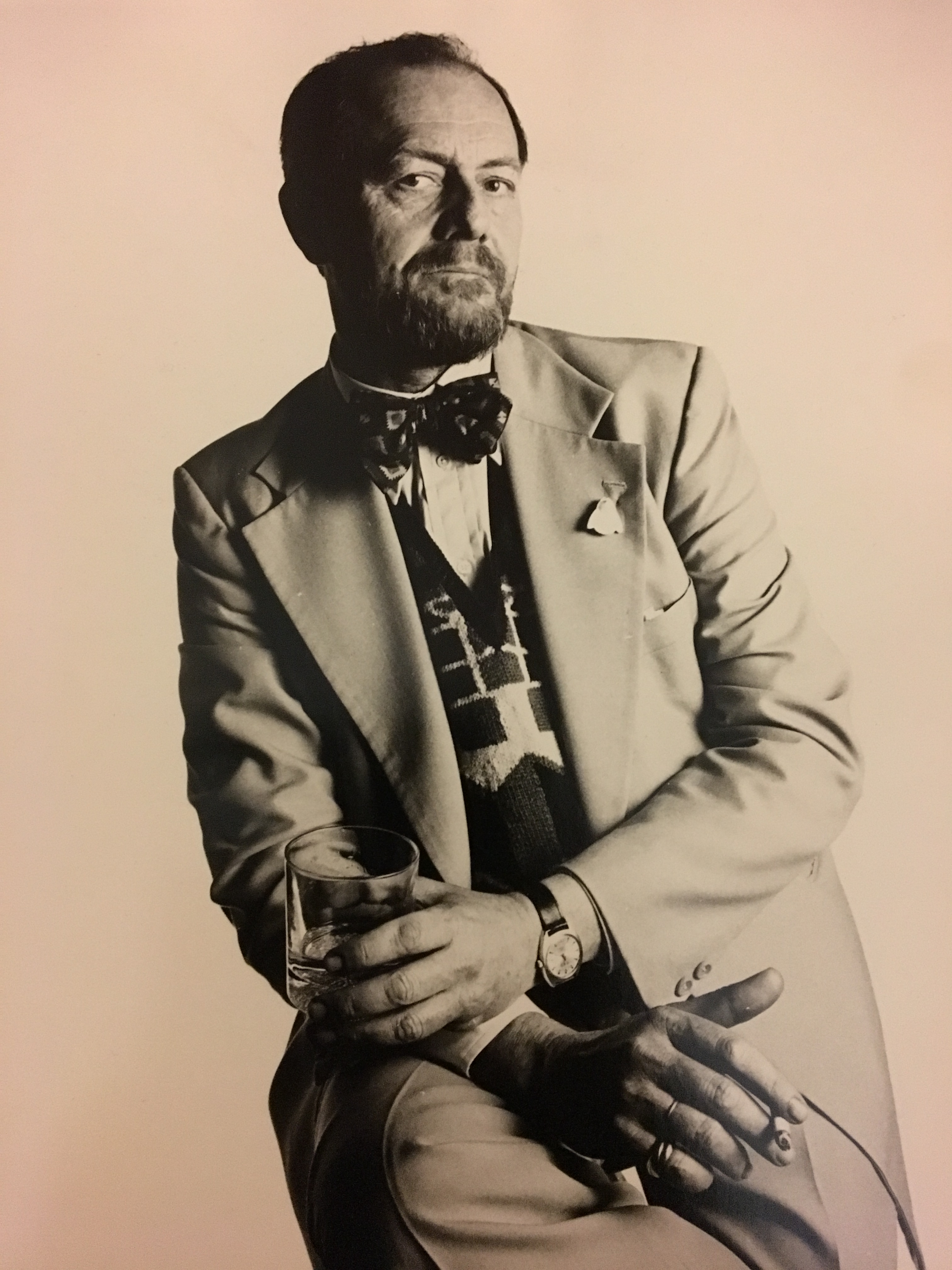
- Percy Savage in 1968 in London
- Born: Donald Percival Savage; 12 October 1926; Brisbane, Queensland, Australia
- Died: 12 August 2008 (aged 81); Hampstead, London, England
- Education: Ipswich Grammar School; École des Beaux-Arts
- Occupations: Fashion publicist; designer; artist
- Years active: 1947–2008
- Spouses: Frances Coolahan (m. 1961; div. 1965); Alicja Sędzińska (m. 1975; died 1990)
- Children: Katherine
- Father: Percival Savage

Donald Percival Savage (12 October 1926 – 12 August 2008) was an Australian fashion publicist, designer, artist, raconteur and bon viveur. He left Australia as a 20-year-old, and spent the rest of his life living and working in Europe. He was the first person to be employed in a public relations capacity in haute couture and is considered to be the original inspiration and instigator of celebrity fashion publicity. During the 1950s and 1960s, Savage was regarded as 'the undisputed prince of public relations for the Paris fashion world.'

== Early life ==
Percy Savage was born in Brisbane, Queensland, Australia on 12 October 1926. He was the son of Marjorie Hall, an accomplished musician, and Major Percival Savage, DSO, an engineer in the First Australian Imperial Force in the First World War, serving as an ANZAC in Gallipoli.

Savage grew up on a fruit farm named Purple Patch in Brookfield on the outskirts of Brisbane with two younger sisters, Mary (born 1928) and Betty (born 1930). During his youth, he sustained several injuries from horse riding including a broken shoulder. He was attacked by dingoes twice. When he was 15 years old, he was bitten by a death adder and severed the little finger on his left hand with a hoe to save his own life. This incident would later be immortalised in a portrait of Savage by Jean Cocteau with the words 'the angel has three fingers'.

Savage attended Ipswich Grammar School. When he was 18, he moved to Sydney to study art.

== Career ==
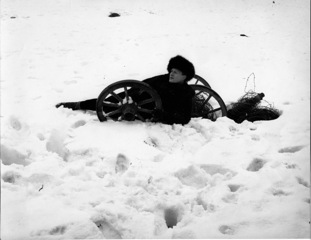
Percy Savage in Russia

In 1947, he left Australia to attend London's Slade School of Art on a Commonwealth scholarship. Upon his arrival, Savage was uninspired by post-war London and headed to Paris within two weeks. He enrolled in l'Ecole des Beaux-Arts and worked part-time as a newspaper proofreader.

Savage graduated in art history and began designing silk scarves for the fashion house Lanvin, Cristóbal Balenciaga, and his close friend, Christian Dior. In 1951, he became the fashion industry's first head of public relations when he took on the newly created role of 'chef de publicité' at Lanvin, a position he held for seven years.

In 1954, Savage took a Lanvin dress to Elizabeth Taylor who was staying at Hotel Meurice, Paris. Savage informed the press that Taylor would be wearing it at her film premiere that evening. When asked about the dress, Taylor replied, 'It's a Lanvin. Isn't it divine?' The resultant front page publicity prompted Paris's regulating fashion body, the Chambre Syndicale de la Couture, to drop its ruling that a fashion house must not reveal details of its clothing to the press for one month after the unveiling of a collection. This flaunting of the long-held convention 'catapulted Savage to the forefront of personality-driven PR' and marked the beginning of celebrity fashion public relations, one of Savage's major contributions to the fashion industry. It heralded the now common practice of red carpet arrivals and celebrity photo opportunities.

Savage recognised the potential of a young Yves Saint Laurent at the International Wool Secretariat in 1954. Together with the editor of French Vogue, Michel de Brunhoff, he introduced Saint Laurent to Dior. Following his stint at Lanvin, Savage was head of public relations at Nina Ricci for six years until the fashion industry went into decline in the late 1960s.

From 1969 until 1973, Savage worked closely with Vogue fashion editor Lady Clare Rendlesham to establish London's first YSL store in New Bond Street. In 1974, he settled permanently in London, living for many years in Camden Town. He set up the public relations firm Fashion Promotions for the advancement of British fashion. Savage played a key role in the launch of the New Wave, the first group designer fashion show ever held in London, which paved the way for London Fashion Week. In 1975, he launched The London Designer Collection Exhibition to tap into the US market for British fashion. He helped launch the careers of British fashion designers such as Zandra Rhodes, Bruce Oldfield, Katharine Hamnett and Wendy Dagworthy as well as encouraging the 'maverick talents' of Vivienne Westwood and John Galliano".

In 1981, Fashion Promotions went into receivership. Savage continued to mentor young designers and worked as Style and Fashion editor for Mayfair.

In 1988–90, he lectured at the American College in London (now known as the Intercontinental University) in Fashion Show Production and was highly revered by his students and fellow faculty.

== Public image ==
Percy Savage had a 'striking presence' with a lanky 1.9 m (6 ft 3 in) frame, a trademark Gauloise cigarette and black Fedora hat. He was described by Suzy Menkes as an 'exotic, outlandish creature'. He is said to have been the inspiration for the name of the Dior men's fragrance 'Eau Sauvage'. He rubbed shoulders with the likes of Maria Callas, Nikita Khrushchev, Ginger Rogers and Rudolf Nureyev. For a time he had an open reservation at Maxim's on the Rue Royale, near the Champs-Elysées, and was much in demand at 'fashionable events, both high society and bohemian'. It is said that on his travels to source fur for the House of Dior, he was presented with a pair of cheetahs by the Emperor of Ethiopia, Haile Selassie, which he took for walks in the Bois de Boulogne.

== Death ==
In 2000, Savage was diagnosed with macular degeneration and in 2002 he was diagnosed with prostate cancer. In 2007, he moved to Primrose Hill. He died in Marie Curie Hospice, Hampstead, on 12 August 2008, conducting Elgar's Pomp and Circumstance "March No. 4" from his bed.
