= Golden Circle (company) =

Australian subsidiary of Kraft Heinz

- Type: Unlisted public company
- Industry: Food and beverage
- Founded: 1946; 80 years ago
- Headquarters: Northgate, Queensland, Australia
- Area served: Multinational
- Products: Over 500
- Number of employees: 1800+
- Parent: Kraft Heinz
- Subsidiaries: Original Juice Co.
- Website: goldencircle.com.au

Golden Circle is a subsidiary of US-based Kraft Heinz, based in Brisbane, Queensland. Its main operations are food processing. Golden Circle was inducted into the Queensland Business Leaders Hall of Fame in 2010, for its significant contribution to the economy of Queensland through the processing of food products, notably fruit and vegetables.

== Beginnings ==
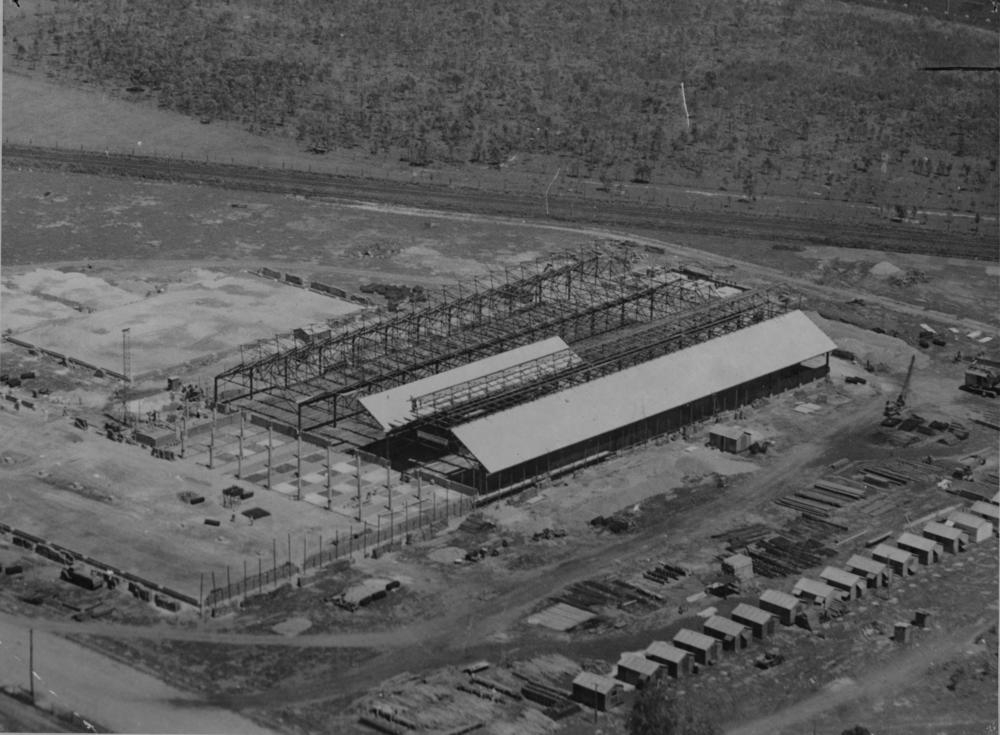
Pineapple cannery under construction at Northgate, 1946

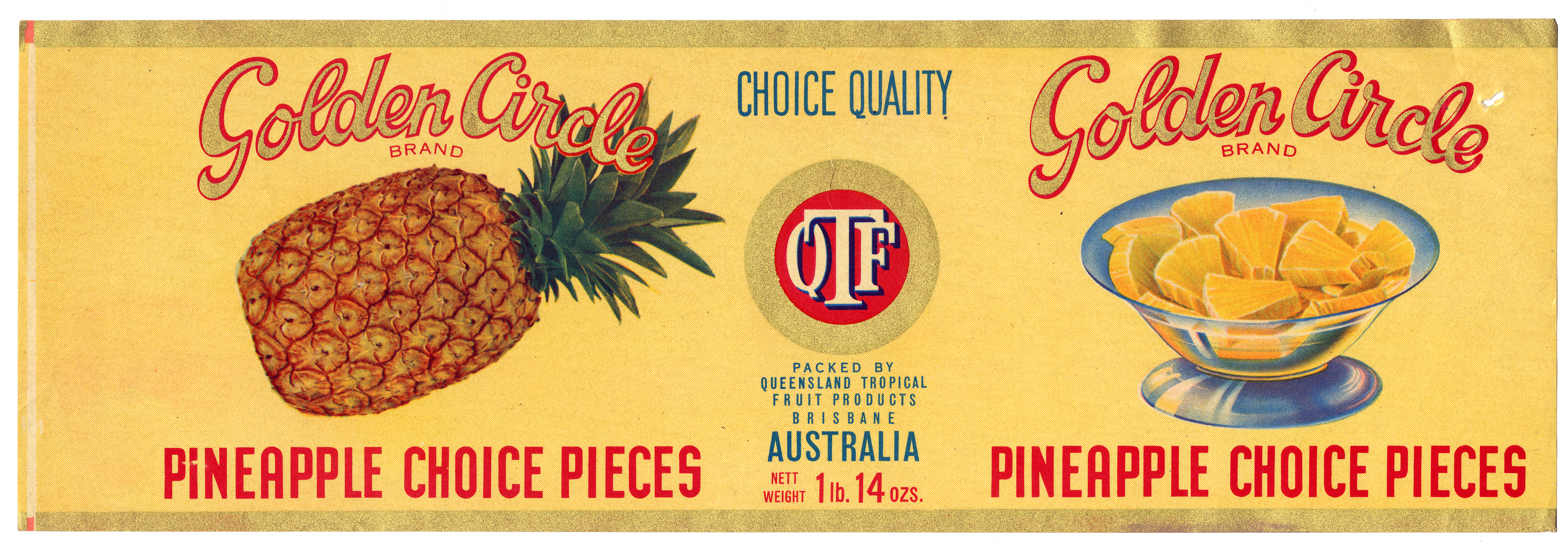
Golden Circle pineapple can label, circa 1947

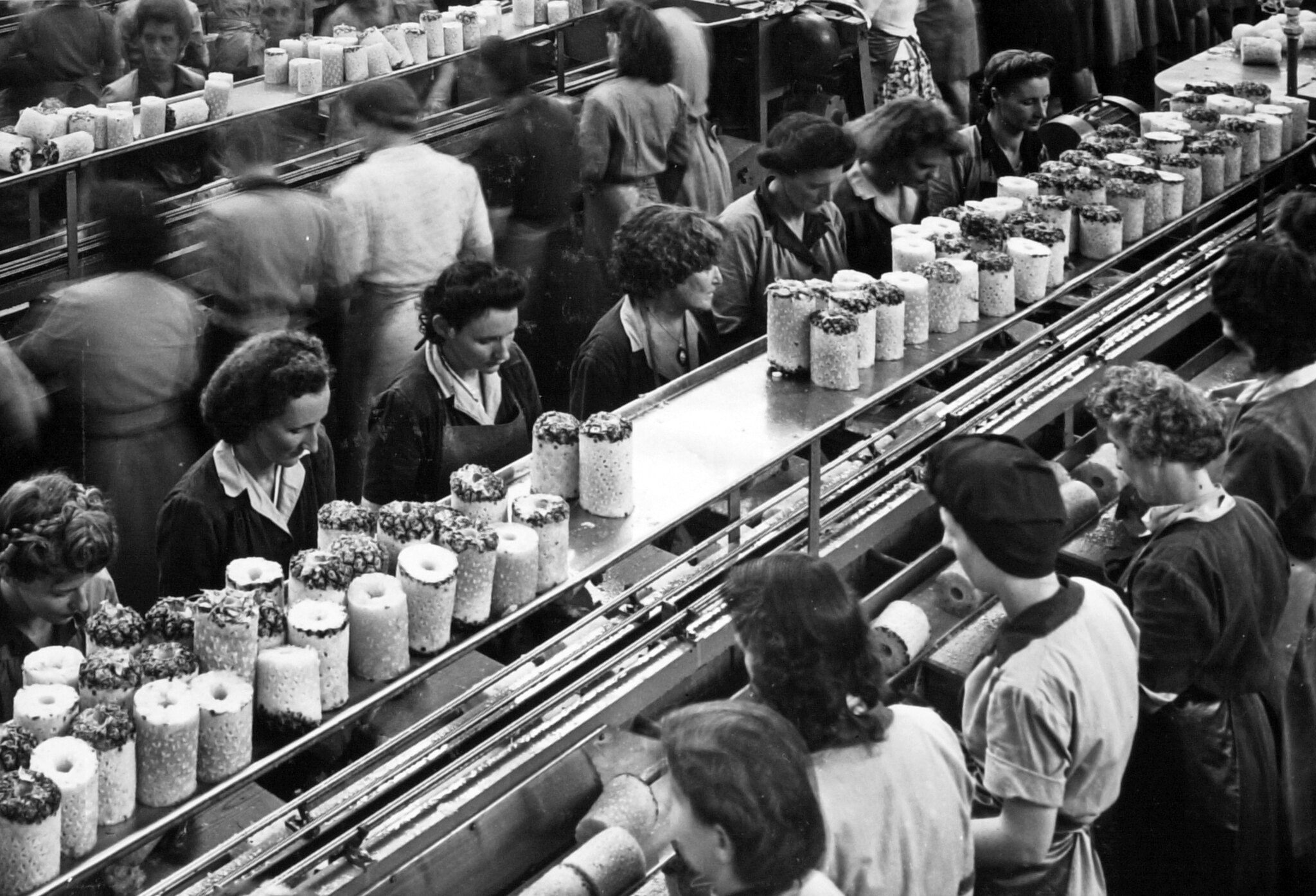
Processing pineapples, 1948

Golden Circle began operations in 1947 after construction of the main canning factory at Northgate was completed. The new facility was opened on 28 October 1947 by the then Premier of Queensland, the Hon Edward Hanlon in the presence of 1500 people including 500 Sunshine Coast fruit growers who arrived on a special train. The company was originally called 'Queensland Tropical Fruit Products', with 'Golden Circle' used as their brand name. Golden Circle was initially part of the Committee of Direction of Fruit Marketing in Queensland (COD). In 1964, under the leadership of Bernard Flewell-Smith and Percival Savage, the cannery was established as a separate business. It was split off from the COD by an amendment to the Fruit Marketing Organisation Acts.

Initially, the company processed and canned pineapples and produced fruit jams. Over the years, production has expanded to include other canned fruit and vegetables, fruit cordials, juices, carbonated beverages and baby food.

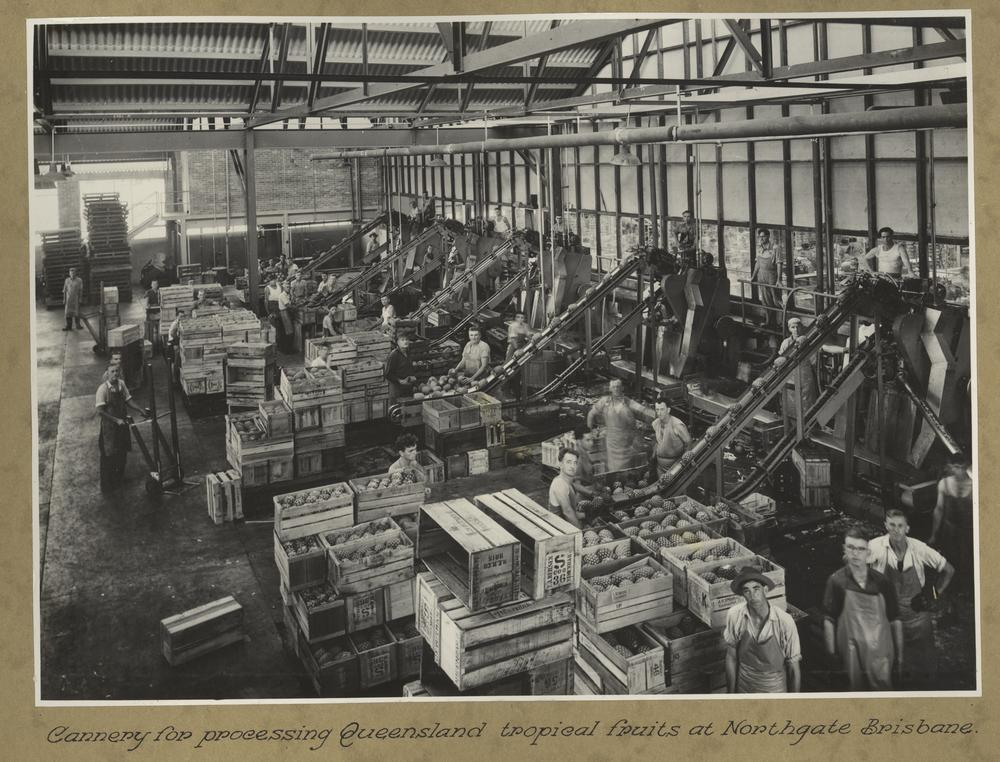
Process workers at work at the Golden Circle cannery, 1947

As of 2009, Golden Circle (GC) ceased to be an Australian-owned company. The board and shareholders of GC agreed and sold all of their shares for 313% more than they were trading at prior to the offer from US Corporation, Heinz.

== Operations ==
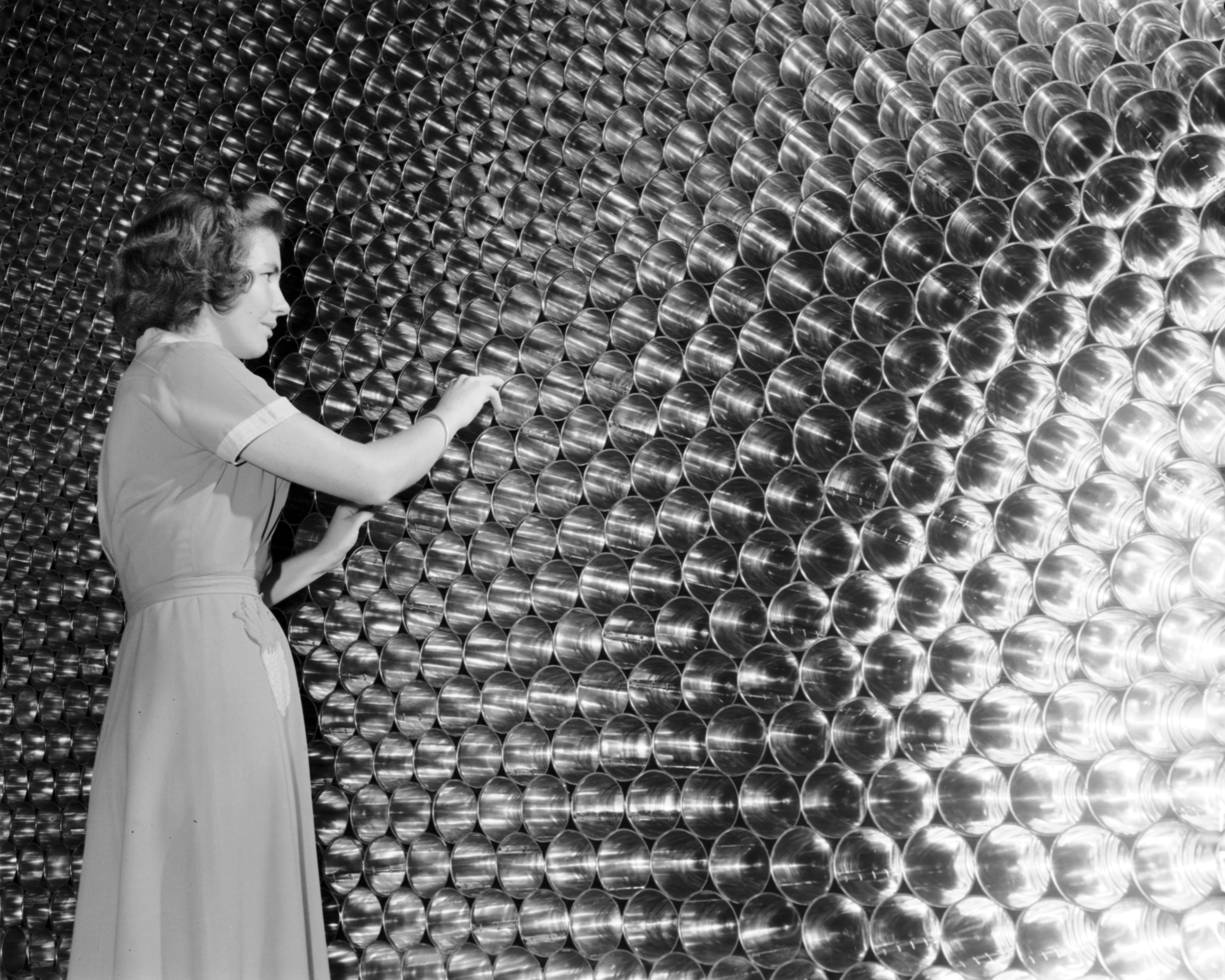
Many cans in the cannery, 1963

In addition to its main processing operation in Brisbane, Golden Circle also owns the Original Juice Co. plant at Mill Park, on Melbourne's northern outskirts, and a fresh fruit packing operation in Griffith, New South Wales.

The company has factory outlets in Capalaba to the east of Brisbane and in Morayfield to the north of Brisbane.

== Takeover bids ==
On 26 September 2007, Coca-Cola Amatil announced it was making a conditional takeover bid for 100% of the company's shares.

On 6 October 2008, Heinz launched a Golden Circle takeover bid. Phillip Cave advised that the take over bid of $1.65 per share ($288 million in total) was "attractive" for all shareholders, particularly given the current difficult economic conditions.

The Heinz takeover bid was finalised successfully on 19 December 2008.

== Production changes & job loss ==
In May 2011 Golden Circle announced it would move beetroot production offshore to New Zealand affecting 160 Golden Circle jobs at the Northgate Plant.

== See also ==
- List of juices
