= Northgate, Queensland =

Northgate
- Suburb
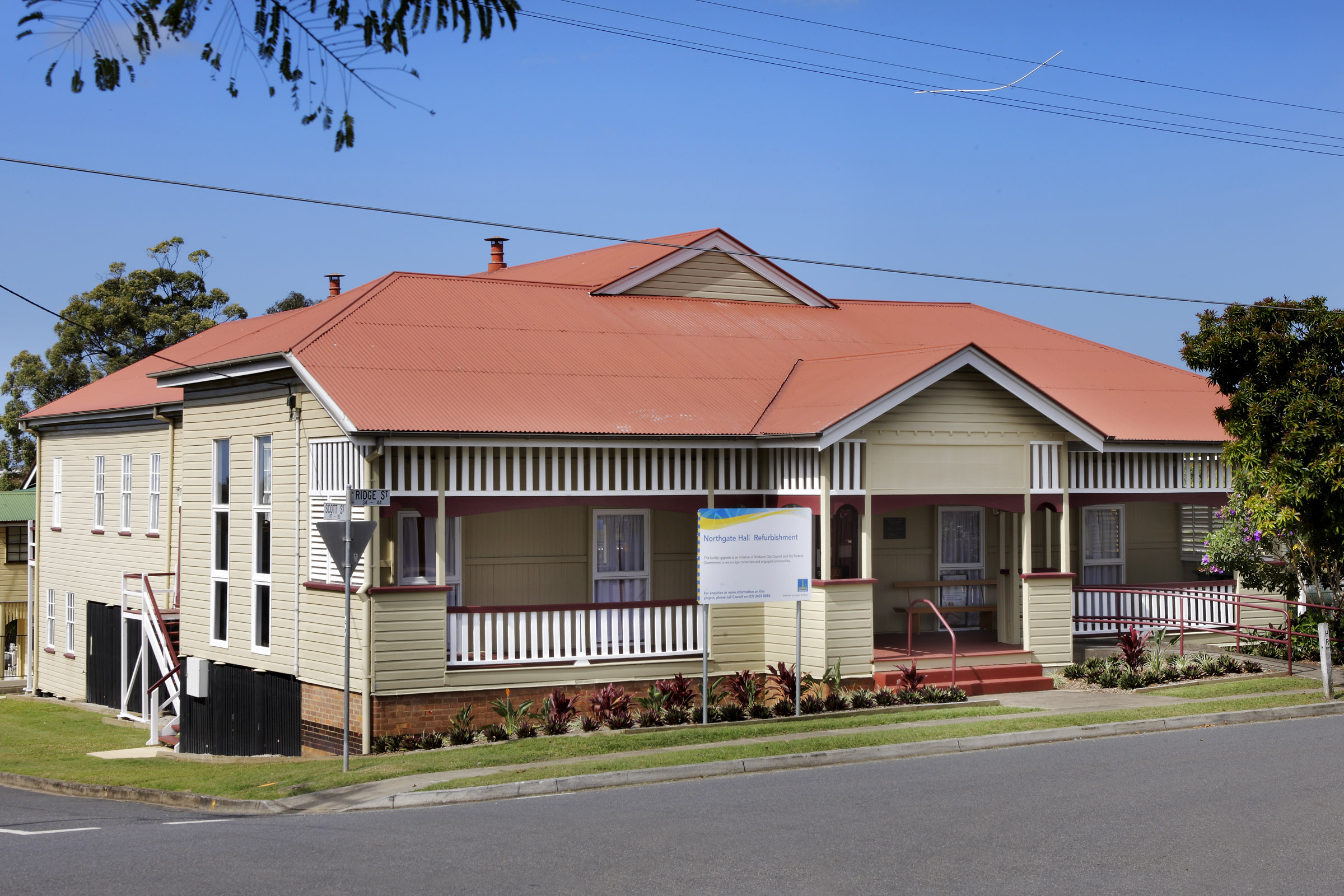
- Northgate Hall

- Interactive map of Northgate
- Coordinates: 27.39°S 153.0733°E
- Country: Australia
- State: Queensland
- City: Brisbane
- LGA: City of Brisbane (Northgate Ward)
- Location: 11.2 km (7.0 mi) NE of Brisbane CBD

Government
  - State electorate: Nudgee
  - Federal division: Lilley

Area
  - Total: 3.3 km^{2} (1.3 sq mi)

Population
  - Total: 4,876 (2021 census)
  - Density: 1,478/km^{2} (3,830/sq mi)
- Time zone: UTC+10:00 (AEST)
- Postcode: 4013
Suburbs around Northgate
Virginia	Banyo	Banyo
Nundah	Northgate	Banyo
Nundah	Nundah	Brisbane Airport

Northgate is a northern suburb in the City of Brisbane, Queensland, Australia. In the 2021 census, Northgate had a population of 4,876 people.

== Geography ==
The land use is a mixture of suburban housing and industrial areas.

The Caboolture / Sunshine Coast railway line and the North Coast railway line enter the suburb from the south (Nundah) and exit to the west (the suburb of Virginia). The Shorncliffe railway line splits from the other railway lines within the suburb, just after the Northgate railway station and continues to the north (Banyo) with Bindha railway station serviing the north of the suburb. Both railway stations are positioned adjacent to industrial areas.

== History ==
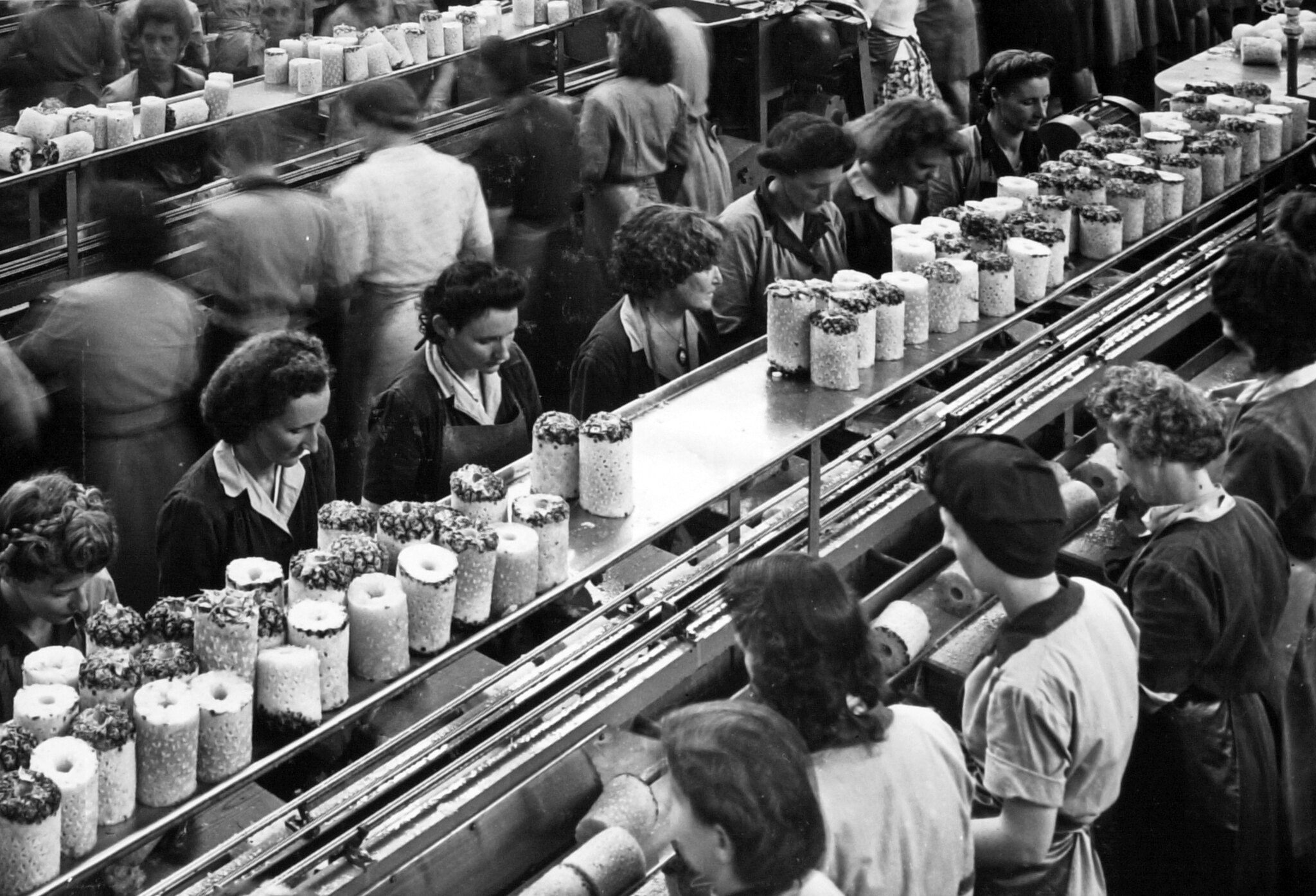
Female workers at the Queensland Tropical Fruit Produce Cannery (Golden Circle), 1948

The suburb's railway station was originally called North Coast Junction, as it was the junction where the North Coast railway line branched from the Sandgate railway line (later the Shorncliffe railway line). In 1890, the Queensland Railways Department renamed the station Northgate, being a coined word combining North from North Coast and gate from Sandgate. The suburb is named after the railway station.

The Northgate-Virginia School of Arts was opened on 20 January 1922 by Matthew Nathan, the Queensland Governor. It consisted of a public hall and a library. It was taken over by the Brisbane City Council circa 1960 and became the Northgate-Virginia Municipal Library and held over 10,000 books. It ceased to be a library and returned to its former role as a public hall under the name Northgate Hall.

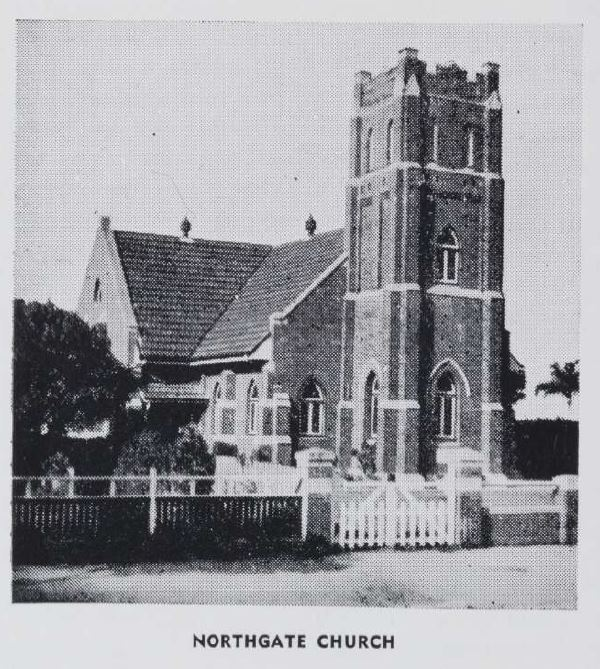
Northgate Methodist Church, circa 1947

Northgate Methodist Church opened in 1928. In 1977, it participated in the amalgamation to create the Uniting Church in Australia and was then known as Northgate Uniting Church. It was subsequently closed, sold, and converted into a house. It was at 116 Peary Street (27.3902°S 153.0650°E).

Golden Circle was established as a growers' co-operative in the 1940s. It opened a pineapple cannery in Northgate in 1947.

St Peter's Mission Anglican Church opened on 13 September 1947. It closed in August 1991. It was at 194 Toombul Road, Northgate East (27.3930°S 153.0730°E); the church building no longer exists.

In February 1949, it was announced that the name of the new railway station on the Sandgate line built to service the cannery would be Bindha, an Aboriginal word meaning food.

On 8 April 1951, the Roman Catholic Archbishop of Brisbane, James Duhig, laid the foundation stone for St John's School on the corner of Nudgee Road and Fraser Road (27.3979°S 153.0747°E). The school opened on 29 January 1952 and was operated by the Presentation Sisters. Declining enrolments caused the school to close at the end of 1995 school year.

Northgate State School opened on 27 January 1959.

St John's Catholic Church was built beside St John's School. Archbishop Duhig laid the foundation stone on 13 May 1962. The completed church was opened on Sunday 5 August 1962 by Archbishop Patrick O'Donnell who dedicated the church as a war memorial for the Royal Australian Navy.

== Demographics ==
In the 2011 census, Northgate had a population of 4,304 people; 49.7% female and 50.3% male. The median age of the Northgate population was 34 years of age, 3 years below the Australian median. Children under 15 years made up 16.9% of the population and people aged 65 years and over made up 9.6% of the population. 72.1% of people living in Northgate were born in Australia, compared to the national average of 69.8%; the next most common countries of birth were New Zealand 4.8%, England 3.1%, India 3%, Philippines 1.1%, China 1.1%. 82.9% of people spoke only English at home; the next most popular languages were 2% Punjabi, 0.8% Hindi, 0.7% Cantonese, 0.7% Mandarin, 0.6% Tagalog.

In the 2016 census, Northgate had a population of 4,568 people.

In the 2021 census, Northgate had a population of 4,876 people.

== Education ==
Northgate State School is a government primary (Prep-6) school for boys and girls at 128 Amelia Street (27.3987°S 153.0708°E). In 2017, the school had an enrolment of 258 students with 25 teachers (16 full-time equivalent) and 17 non-teaching staff (10 full-time equivalent). Although within the suburb of Northgate, it sits on the boundary with Nundah and is accessed via Amelia Street in Nundah. Virginia State School in Virginia and Nundah State School in Nundah also serve students in the north and west of Northgate respectively.

There are no secondary schools in Northgate. The nearest government secondary schools are Earnshaw State College in Banyo and Aviation High in Hendra.

== Amenities ==
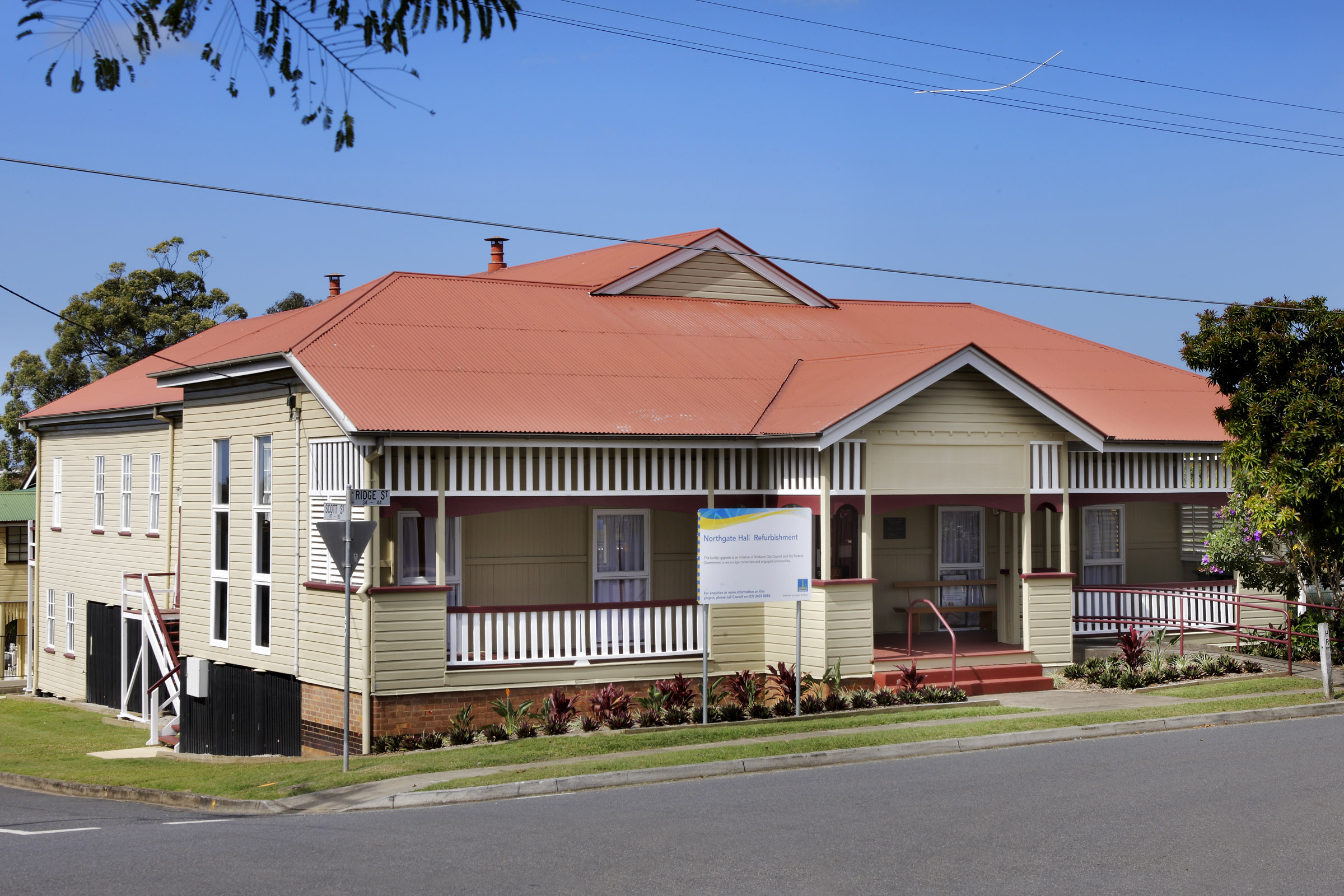
Northgate Hall in 2011

The Northgate Hall is on the corner of Scott and Ridge Streets (27.3870°S 153.0637°E). It is operated by the Brisbane City Council and can be hired for events.

St John's Catholic Church is at 688 Nudgee Road (27.3983°S 153.0744°E) within the Mother of Mercy parish.

== Sports ==
Norths Rugby League football club is located in Nundah, and has developed Australian footballers including Melbourne Storm players Billy Slater, Greg Inglis and Cooper Cronk.

== Attractions ==
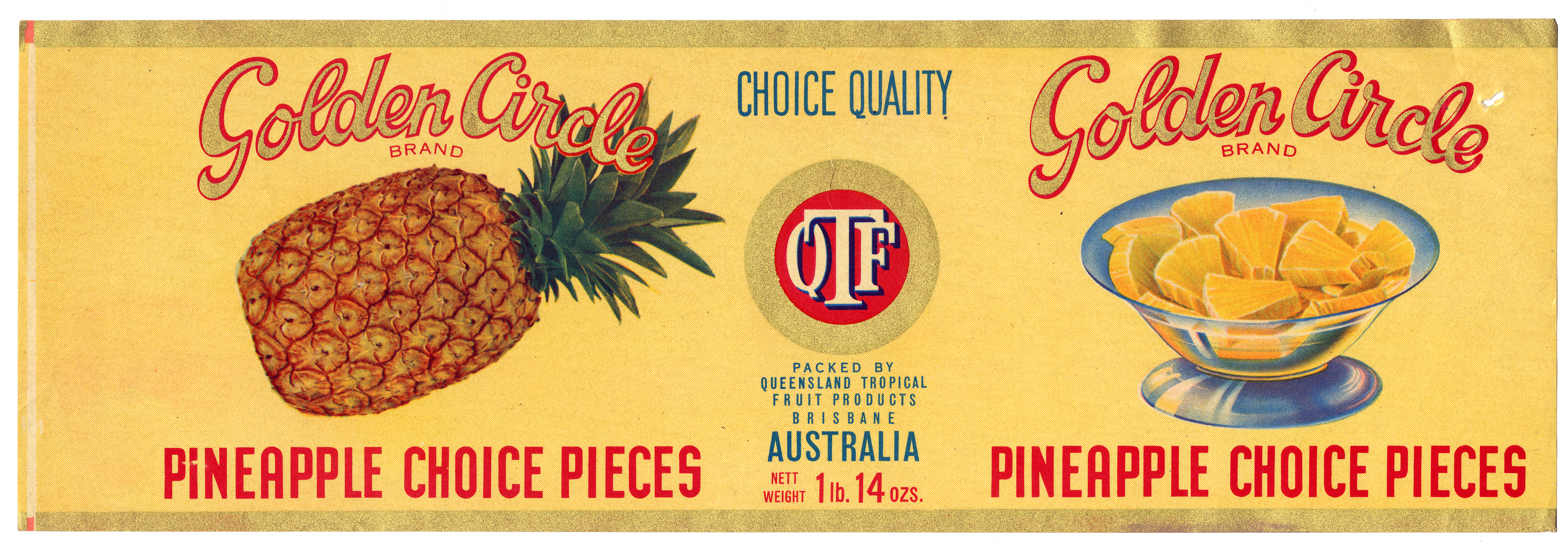
Golden Circle pineapple label, circa 1947

Northgate holds the Golden Circle processing plant, which is on Earnshaw Road (27.3847°S 153.0729°E). Golden Circle is 1 kilometre (0.62 mi) long and occupies 16.5 hectares (41 acres) with its factories processing all the Golden Circle foods which are found in stores all around Australia. The factory in Northgate once contained a café for visitors to come to and sample Golden Circle produced food. The café and factory outlet is now closed but there are two new ones in Capalaba to the east of Brisbane and in Morayfield to the north of Brisbane.

== Transport ==
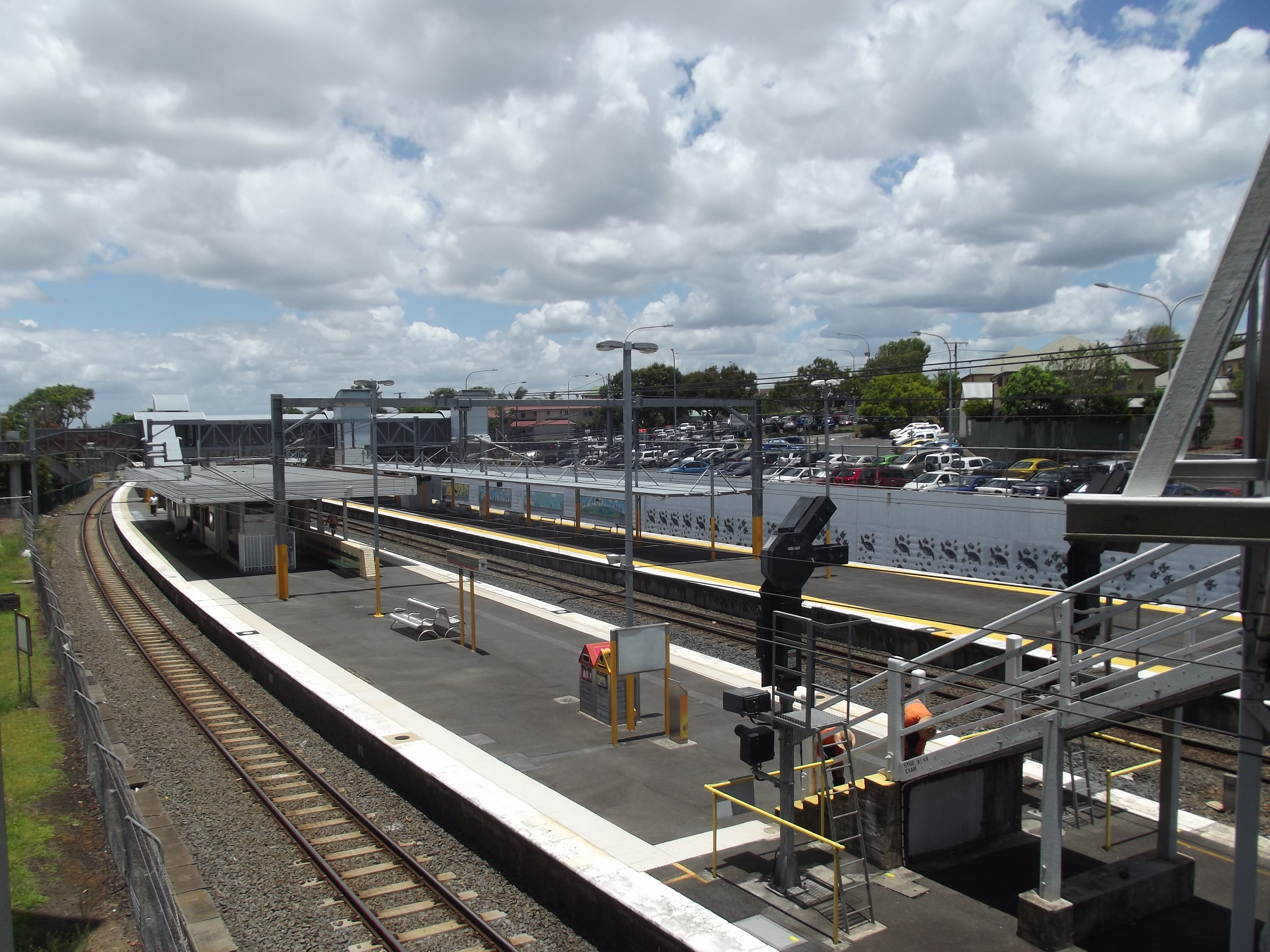
Northgate Railway Station, 2012

Northgate railway station is the junction for the Shorncliffe and North Coast Lines (27.3931°S 153.0694°E), with frequent services to the city, Shorncliffe and Caboolture and interurban services to Nambour/Gympie. Northgate train station is the branching point were both Shorncliffe and Caboolture trains can be caught, meaning that a lot of express trains stop at Northgate, for passengers making a switch between branches. Transport for Brisbane also operates the "306" and "307" bus services through this suburb. The railway station was the limit of train service until the line was extended to Sandgate in the late 1880s.

In the 2011 census, 22.6% of employed people traveled to work on public transport and 53.2% by car (either as driver or as passenger).

Bindha railway station is on the Shorncliffe railway line on the boundary between Northgate and Virginia (27.3829°S 153.0725°E).

== Notable people ==
- Steven Bradbury – 2002 winter Olympic gold medal winner.
