= Virginia railway station =

Railway station in Queensland, Australia

Virginia
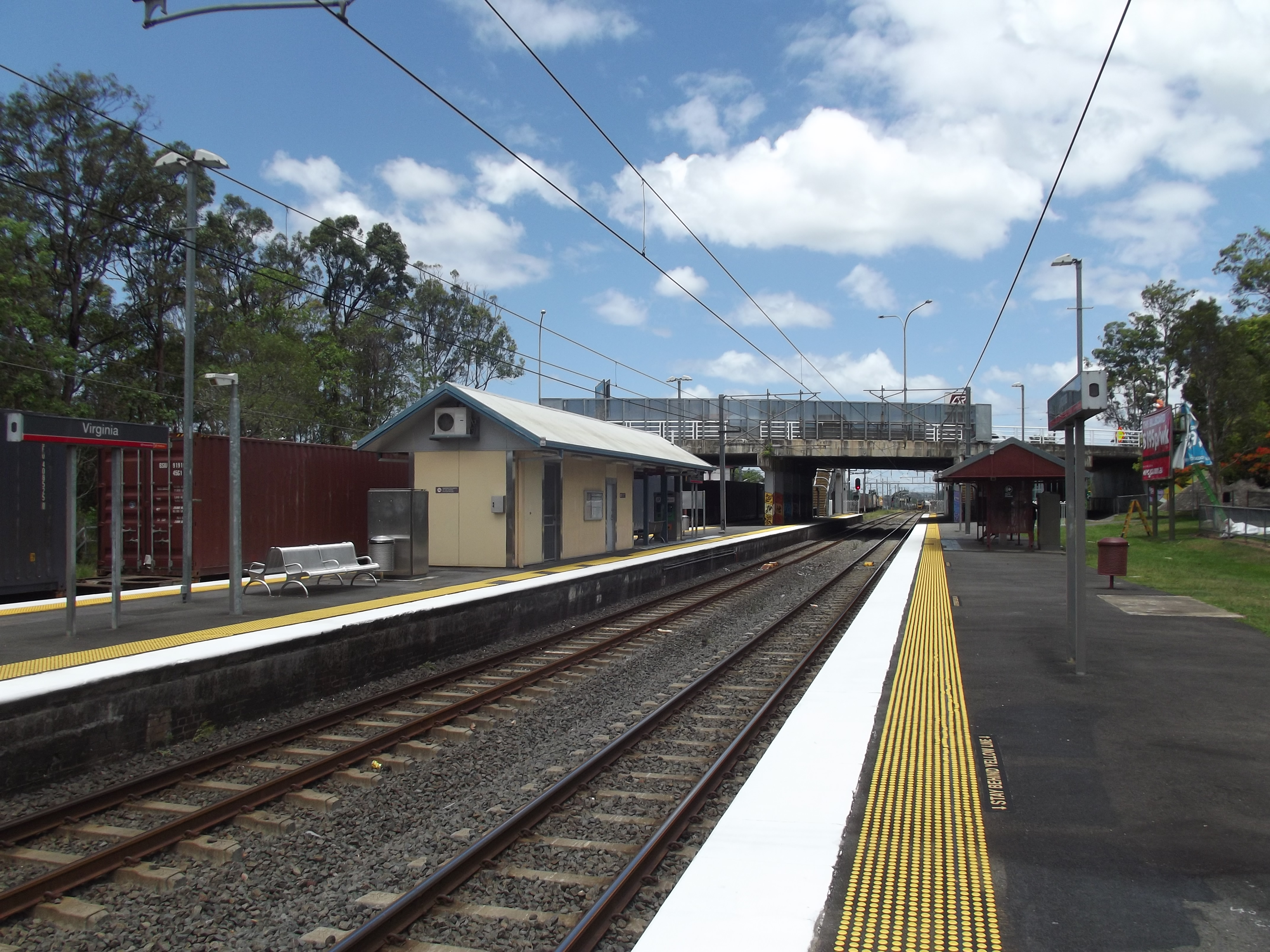
- Southbound view from Platform 3 in December 2012

General information
- Location: Selmur Lane, Virginia
- Coordinates: 27.3821°S 153.0624°E
- Owner: Queensland Rail
- Operator: Queensland Rail
- Line: Redcliffe Peninsula
- Distance: 11.29 kilometres from Central
- Platforms: 3 (1 side, 1 island)

Construction
- Structure type: Ground
- Parking: 20 bays
- Accessible: Yes

Other information
- Status: Staffed part-time
- Station code: 600437 (platform 1); 600438 (platform 2); 600439 (platform 3)
- Fare zone: Zone 2
- Website: Queensland Rail

History
- Opened: 1888; 138 years ago

Services
Preceding station	Queensland Rail	Following station
Northgate towards Springfield Central via Roma Street	Redcliffe Peninsula line	Sunshine towards Kippa-Ring
Location

Virginia is a railway station operated by Queensland Rail on the Redcliffe Peninsula line. It opened in 1888 and serves the Brisbane suburb of Virginia. It is a ground level station, featuring one island platforms with two faces each and one side platform.

== History ==
On 28 August 2000, a third platform opened as part of the addition of a third track from Northgate to Bald Hills.

== Services ==
Virginia is served by all Citytrain network services from Kippa-Ring to Central, many continuing to Springfield Central.

== Services by platform ==
Virginia platform arrangement
Platform	Line	Destinations	Notes
1	Redcliffe Peninsula	Roma Street & Springfield Central	
1	Redcliffe Peninsula	Ipswich	1 weekday afternoon service only
2	Redcliffe Peninsula	Kippa-Ring	Evening peak only
3	Redcliffe Peninsula	Kippa-Ring	
