= Australian Sidecar Speedway Championship =

- Sport: Sidecar speedway

The Australian Sidecar Championship is a speedway championship held each year to determine the Australian national champions. The event is sanctioned and run by Motorcycling Australia (MA) and is held in a different state every year. The Australian Sidecar Championship was first held in 1931 at the Melbourne Exhibition Speedway and was won by Victorian pair Les Medlycott and his passenger "Tich" Jones

The 2013 Australian Speedway Sidecar Championship was held at the Gillman Speedway in Adelaide, South Australia, and was won by Darrin Treloar (NSW) and his Victorian swinger Simon Cohrs. It was a record 7th Australian Championship win for Treloar, while for Cohrs it was his second win.

The 2014 Australian Championship was held at the Loxford Park Speedway in Kurri Kurri, New South Wales, on 28–29 March. Darrin Treloar (NSW) won his 8th Australian Championship, his new passenger Blake Cox scored his first win of this championship.

The 2015 Australian Championship was held at the Arunga Park Speedway in Alice Springs on 4–5 April. It was the first time the 402 metres (440 yards) speedway has hosted the championship since 1985. South Australian pair Justin Plaisted and Sam Harrison won the title. For Plaisted, who had won the championship three times as a passenger with Darrin Treloar, it was his first win as a rider.

The 2016 championship was held at the Olympic Park Speedway in Mildura on 8–9 April with NSW pair Darrin Treloar (who won his record 9th title) and Blake Cox taking the win.

The 2017 Australian Championship was held at the Gillman Speedway. South Australia's Trent Headland and his British passenger Darryl Whetstone went one better than they had done in 2016 when they won their first Australian championship with Whetstone also becoming the first non-Australian to win the title.

== Winners since 1931 ==
| Year | Venue | City/State | Winners | Runner-up | 3rd place |
| 1931 | Exhibition Speedway | Melbourne, Vic | Les Medlycott (Vic) 'Tich' Jones (Vic) | Arthur Millard (Vic) | |
| 1932-1939 | not held | | | | |
| Year | Venue | City/State | Winners | Runner-up | 3rd place |
| 1940-1945 | not held | | | | |
| 1946 | Sydney Sports Ground | Sydney, NSW | Jack Carruthers (NSW); Paul Bridson (NSW) | Jack Clarke (NSW); Ken Bateman (NSW) | Kev Gallaher (NSW); A. Harvey (NSW) |
| 1947 (3 laps) | Sydney Showground Speedway | Sydney, NSW | Jim Davies (Vic); Peter Glynn (NSW) | Keith Ratten (Vic); Reg Dee (NSW) | Ces Proudman |
| 1947 (2 laps) | Tracey's Speedway | Melbourne, Vic | Keith Ratten (Vic); Charlie Perabo (NSW) | Bill Barker (Vic); Ray Wason (Vic) | Harry Down (Vic); Keith Clare (Vic) |
| 1948 (3 laps) | Tracey's Speedway | Melbourne, Vic | Keith Ratten (Vic); Paul Bridson (NSW) | Eric Haslam (Vic); Ray Mackie | Bruce Rehn (SA); Barney Hughes (Vic) |
| 1948 (3 laps) | Kilburn Speedway | Adelaide, SA | Jim Davies (Vic); Peter Speerin (NSW) | Keith Ratten (Vic); Les Smedley (SA) | Trevor Richardson (SA); Jock Brown |
| 1949 | not held | | | | |
| Year | Venue | City/State | Winners | Runner-up | 3rd place |
| 1950 (3 laps) | Kilburn Speedway | Adelaide, SA | Jim Davies (Vic); Doug Tankard (NSW) | Norm Cook (Vic); J. Harper | Chook Hodgekiss (NSW); P. Stanley |
| 1950 (4 laps) | Sydney Sports Ground | Sydney, NSW | Jack Carruthers (NSW); Reg Dee (NSW) | Chook Hodgekiss (NSW); Jeff Burt | Jim Davies (Vic); Doug Tankard (NSW) |
| 1951 | Kilburn Speedway | Adelaide, SA | Jim Davies (Vic); Doug Tankard (NSW) | Ron Anderson (SA); B. Flavel | Eric Hughan (NSW); Barrie Stauffer (NSW) |
| 1952 | Rowley Park Speedway | Adelaide, SA | Chook Hodgekiss (NSW); Charlie Kendall | Jim Davies (Vic) | 'Clacker' Levy; Charlie Moran |
| 1953-1958 | not held | | | | |
| 1959 | Rowley Park Speedway | Adelaide, SA | Don Willison; Des Dick | Bruce Kelley; Doug Fleet | Stan Smith; Laurie Noye |
| Year | Venue | City/State | Winners | Runner-up | 3rd place |
| 1960 | Rowley Park Speedway | Adelaide, SA | Bruce Kelley; Doug Fleet | Stan Smith; Laurie Noye | Ron Johnson |
| 1961 | Brisbane Exhibition Ground | Brisbane, Qld | Les Medlycott (Vic) 'Tich | Kev Trembath (Qld); John Carter | Alan Matook (Qld); Laurie Johnson |
| 1962 | Brisbane Exhibition Ground | Brisbane, Qld | Bill Bingham (NSW); Bob Levy (NSW) | Charlie McConnell (SA); Don Ballis (Qld) | No Third Place |
| 1963 | Sydney Showground Speedway | Sydney, NSW | Ron Johnson (Qld); Les Bertwhistle | Don Willison (SA); Bob Sierp | Sandy McCrae (Qld); Don Carmody |
| 1964 | Rowley Park Speedway | Adelaide, SA | Bruce Kelley (SA); Barry Dienhoff (SA) | Charlie McConnell (SA); Ray Holt (SA) | Stan Smith (SA); Len Johnston (SA) |
| 1965 | not held | | | | |
| 1966 | Sydney Showground Speedway | Sydney, NSW | Bob Levy (NSW); Col Lewis (NSW) | Doug Tyerman (NSW); Dick Kelly | Harry Denton (SA); Bob Sierp |
| 1967 | Sydney Showground Speedway | Sydney, NSW | Doug Robson (NSW); Rob Lewis (NSW) | Harry Denton (SA); Bob Sierp | Bob Levy (NSW); Col Lewis (NSW) |
| 1968 | Sydney Showground Speedway | Sydney, NSW | Len Bowes (SA); Wayne Reuter (SA) | Doug Robson (NSW); Rob Lewis (NSW) | Bob Levy (NSW); Col Lewis (NSW) |
| 1969 | Sydney Showground Speedway | Sydney, NSW | Graham Young (NSW); Ray Murray (NSW) | Doug Robson (NSW); Jack Robson (NSW) | David Adams (NSW); David Parker (SA) |
| Year | Venue | City/State | Winners | Runner-up | 3rd place |
| 1970 | not held | | | | |
| 1971 | Sydney Showground Speedway | Sydney, NSW | Garry Innis (NSW); Russell Meyer | Graham Young (NSW); Ray Murray (NSW) | Doug Robson (NSW); Rob Lewis (NSW) |
| 1972 | Sydney Showground Speedway | Sydney, NSW | Geoff Grocott (NSW); Warren Sullivan (NSW) | Garry Innis (NSW); Kerry Pont (NSW) | Neil Munro (SA); Rod Lang (SA) |
| 1973 | Rowley Park Speedway | Adelaide, SA | Neil Munro (SA); Rod Lang (SA) | Bill Mitchell (SA); David Weaver (SA) | Dennis Nash (WA); Ray Barber (WA) |
| 1974 | Sydney Showground Speedway | Sydney, NSW | Doug Robson (NSW); Ray Rose (NSW) | Garry Innis (NSW); John Lloyd (NSW) | Steve Rychvalsky (NSW); Ian Cochrane (NSW) |
| 1975 | Northern Park | Melbourne, Vic | Doug Robson (NSW); Greg Griffiths (NSW) | Terry Rooney (Vic); Ian Treloar (Vic) | Neil Munro (SA); Chris Flaherty (SA) |
| 1976 | Jerilderie Park Speedway | Newcastle, NSW | Dennis Nash (WA); Russell Hearn (WA) | Terry Rooney (Vic); Ian Treloar (Vic) | Graeme Harris (WA); Andy Bowman (WA) |
| 1977 | Claremont Speedway | Perth, WA | Ken I'Anson (SA); Rod Lang (SA) | Dennis Nash (WA); Russell Hearn (Vic) | Kym McConnell (SA); David Parker (SA) |
| 1978 | Rowley Park Speedway | Adelaide, SA | Keith Sewell (Qld); Paddy Kuhnert (Qld) | Ken Walker (Vic); Jamie Walker (Vic) | Dean Taylor (SA); Peter Menz (SA) |
| 1979 | Sydney Showground Speedway | Sydney, NSW | Keith Sewell (Qld); Neil Gould (Qld) | Doug Tyerman (NSW); Ray Murray (NSW) | Warren Sullivan (NSW); Bill Dudenhoeffer (NSW) |
| Year | Venue | City/State | Winners | Runner-up | 3rd place |
| 1980 | Avalon Raceway | Lara, Vic | Ken Walker (Vic); Jamie Walker (Vic) | Dennis Nash (WA); Denis Mortimer (WA) | David Adams (NSW); David Parker (SA) |
| 1981 | Claremont Speedway | Perth, WA | Dennis Nash (WA); Denis Mortimer (WA) | Keith Sewell (Qld); Neil Gould (Qld) | Brian Shultz (SA); Geoff Graetz (SA) |
| 1982 | Speedway Park | Virginia, SA | Clarry Jones (Vic); Peter Marriage (Vic) | Brian Shultz (SA); Geoff Graetz (SA) | Peter Menz (SA); Brenton Langlois (SA) |
| 1983 | Northline Speedway | Darwin, NT | Dennis Nash (WA); Denis Mortimer (WA) | Paul Penhaligon (Qld); Kim French (Qld) | Rod Lang (SA); Shane Wade (SA) |
| 1984 | Liverpool City Raceway | Sydney, NSW | Phil McCurtayne (NSW); Dennis Potts (NSW) | Paul Pinfold ( (United Kingdom) ) Alan Artus ( (United Kingdom) ) | Clarry Jones (Vic); Les Gates (Vic) |
| 1985 | Arunga Park Speedway | Alice Springs, NT | Phil McCurtayne (NSW); Dennis Potts (NSW) | Brian Radford (SA); Colin Olds (SA) | Gary Joyce (WA); Warren Joyce (WA) |
| 1986 | Carina Speedway | Cairns, Qld | Phil McCurtayne (NSW); Stuart Kirk (NSW) | Shane Souter (Vic); Mick Pratt (Vic) | Andrew Cleave (Vic); Tom Cleave (Vic) |
| 1987 | Archerfield Speedway | Brisbane, Qld | Andrew Cleave (Vic); Dave Power (Vic) | Martien Hurkmans (SA); Rick Schonfeldt (SA) | Phil McCurtayne (NSW); Stuart Kirk (NSW) |
| 1988 | Claremont Speedway | Perth, WA | Dennis Nash (WA); Jeff Gittus (WA) | Ed Blakeney (WA); Beth Litterick (WA) | Mark Rothe (WA); Mick Forward (WA) |
| 1989 | Olympic Park Speedway | Mildura, Vic | Dennis Nash (WA); Jeff Gittus (WA) | Andrew Cleave (Vic); Dave Power (Vic) | Ian Smith (Vic); Craig Fordham (Vic) |
| Year | Venue | City/State | Winners | Runner-up | 3rd place |
| 1990 | Riverview Speedway | Murray Bridge, SA | Shane Souter (Vic); Robert Renwood (Vic) | Steve Hawtin (Qld); Glenn Golding (Qld) | Russell Mitchell (WA); Chris Page (WA) |
| 1991 | Newcastle Motordrome | Newcastle, NSW | Gary Moon (Qld); Paul Norton (Qld) | Ian Smith (Vic); Craig Fordham (Vic) | Russell Mitchell (WA); Chris Page (WA) |
| 1992 | Brisbane Exhibition Ground | Brisbane, Qld | Russell Mitchell (WA); Chris Page (WA) | Ian Smith (Vic); Craig Fordham (Vic) | Merv Harris (Qld); Gordon Cox (Qld) |
| 1993 | Northline Speedway | Darwin, NT | Darrin Treloar (NSW); Allan Griffiths (NSW) | Andrew Cleave (Vic); Dave Power (Vic) | Phil Rowen (Qld); Jim Duncan (Qld) |
| 1994 | Broken Hill Speedway | Broken Hill, NSW | Mark Drew (WA); Tina Karan (WA) | Bernie Koppe (Qld); Bill Gilbert (Qld) | Darrin Treloar (NSW); Allan Griffiths (NSW) |
| 1995 | Newcastle Motordrome | Newcastle, NSW | Darrin Treloar (NSW); Zac Hogan (NSW) | Russell Mitchell (WA); Kirk Knapman (WA) | Mark Drew (WA); Tina Karan (WA) |
| 1996 | Olympic Park Speedway | Mildura, Vic | Andrew Cleave (Vic); Dave Power (Vic) | Gary Moon (Qld); Paul Norton (Qld) | Col Winzar (Vic); Bill Beanham (Vic) |
| 1997 | Riverview Speedway | Murray Bridge, SA | Glen Hough (Vic); Rob Armstrong (Vic) | Vic Martin (Qld); Bob Hill (Qld) | Glenn O'Brien (WA); Nathan O'Brien (WA) |
| 1998 | Claremont Speedway | Perth, WA | Russell Mitchell (WA); Brett Evill (WA) | Glenn O'Brien (WA); Nathan O'Brien (WA) | Mark Drew (WA); Chris Page (WA) |
| 1998 | Claremont Speedway | Perth, WA | Vic Martin (Qld); Bob Hill (Qld) | Brad Willis (WA); Mick Sita (WA) | Darren Nash (WA); Kirk Knapman (WA) |
| 1999 | Townsville Speedway | Townsville, Queensland, Qld | Mark Drew (WA); Stephen Blair (WA) | Vic Martin (Qld); Bob Hill (Qld) | Darren Nash (WA); Peter Teale (WA) |
| Year | Venue | City/State | Winners | Runner-up | 3rd place |
| 2000 | Riverview Speedway | Murray Bridge, SA | Glenn O'Brien (WA); Nathan O'Brien (WA) | Andrew Cleave (Vic); Dave Power (Vic) | Mark Drew (NT); Stephen Blair (NT) |
| 2001 | Olympic Park Speedway | Mildura, Vic | Glenn O'Brien (WA); Nathan O'Brien (WA) | Gary Moon (Qld); Chris Hughes (Qld) | Andrew Cleave (Vic); Kevin Waters (Vic) |
| 2002 | Riverview Speedway | Murray Bridge, SA | Glenn O'Brien (WA); Nathan O'Brien (WA) | Andrew Cleave (Vic); Dave Power (Vic) | Darrin Treloar (NSW); Justin Plaisted (SA) |
| 2003 | Olympic Park Speedway | Mildura, Vic | Andrew Cleave (Vic); Dave Power (Vic) | Jayden Mayes (Vic); Jaeben Underhill | Warren Monson (Vic); Scott Cameron |
| 2004 | Bibra Lake Speedway | Perth, WA | Glenn O'Brien (WA); Nathan O'Brien (WA) | Mark Drew (NT); Stephen Blair (NT) | Scott Christopher (Qld); Trent Koppe (Qld) |
| 2005 | Riverview Speedway | Murray Bridge, SA | Scott Christopher (Qld); Trent Koppe (Qld) | David Bottrell (SA); Peter Teale (WA) | Gary Moon (Qld); Nathan O'Brien (WA) |
| 2006 | Gosford Speedway | Gosford, NSW | Darrin Treloar (NSW); Justin Plaisted (SA) | Stuart Firth (Qld); Duane Dennis (Qld) | Scott Christopher (Qld); Trent Koppe (Qld) |
| 2007 | Pioneer Park Speedway | Ayr, Qld | Darrin Treloar (NSW); Justin Plaisted (SA) | Gary Moon (Qld); Duane Dennis (Qld) | Scott Christopher (Qld); Trent Koppe (Qld) |
| 2008 | Gillman Speedway | Adelaide, SA | Darrin Treloar (NSW); Justin Plaisted (SA) | Mick Headland (SA); Paul Waters (SA) | Grant Bond (NSW); Glen Cox (NSW) |
| 2009 | Olympic Park Speedway | Mildura, Vic | Mark Mitchell (SA); Tom Golding (SA) | Darrin Treloar (NSW); Justin Plaisted (SA) | Rick Howse (NSW); Adam Commons (NSW) |
| Year | Venue | City/State | Winners | Runner-up | 3rd place |
| 2010 | Newcastle Showgrounds | Newcastle, NSW | Jason Aldridge (Qld); Cal Campbell (Qld) | Rick Howse (NSW); Adam Commons (NSW) | Darrin Treloar (NSW); Justin Plaisted (SA) |
| 2011 | Gillman Speedway | Adelaide, SA | Glenn O'Brien (WA); Aaron Maynard (WA) | Darrin Treloar (NSW); Justin Plaisted (SA) | Mark Plaisted (SA); Jamie Banks (SA) |
| 2012 | Loxford Park Speedway | Kurri Kurri, NSW | Darrin Treloar (NSW); Simon Cohrs (Vic) | Grant Bond (NSW); Glen Cox (NSW) | Scott Christopher (Qld); Tyler Moon (Qld) |
| 2013 | Gillman Speedway | Adelaide, SA | Darrin Treloar (NSW); Simon Cohrs (Vic) | Mick Headland (SA); Paul Waters (SA) | Mark Plaisted (SA); Sam Gilbert (SA) |
| 2014 | Loxford Park Speedway | Kurri Kurri, NSW | Darrin Treloar (NSW); Blake Cox (NSW) | Dave Bottrell (Qld); Ben Pitt (Qld) | Grant Bond (NSW); Glen Cox (NSW) |
| 2015 | Arunga Park Speedway | Alice Springs, NT | Justin Plaisted (SA); Sam Harrison (SA) | Warren Monson (Vic); Matt Morgan (SA) | Mick Headland (SA); Jesse Headland (SA) |
| 2016 | Olympic Park Speedway | Mildura, Vic | Darrin Treloar (NSW); Blake Cox (NSW) | Trent Headland (SA); Darryl Whetstone ( (United Kingdom) ) | Shane Hudson (NSW); Eli Wright (NSW) |
| 2017 | Gillman Speedway | Adelaide, SA | Trent Headland (SA); Darryl Whetstone ( (United Kingdom) ) | Andrew Buchanan ( (New Zealand) ) Denny Cox (NSW) | Warren Monson (Vic); Andrew Summerhayes (Vic) |
| 2018 | Oakburn Park Speedway | Tamworth, NSW | Darrin Treloar (NSW); Jesse Headland (SA) | Andrew Buchanan ( (New Zealand) ) Denny Cox (NSW) | Trent Headland (SA); Darryl Whetstone ( (United Kingdom) ) |
| 2019 | Pioneer Park Speedway | Ayr, Qld | Darrin Treloar (NSW); Blake Cox (NSW) | Warren Monson (Vic); Andrew Summerhayes (Vic) | Mark Plaisted (SA); Ben Pitt (Vic) |
| Year | Venue | City/State | Winners | Runner-up | 3rd place |
| 2020 | Not held due to COVID-19 restrictions | | | | |
| 2021 | Olympic Park Speedway | Mildura, Vic | Mark Plaisted (SA); Ben Pitt (Vic) | Warren Monson (Vic); Andrew Summerhayes (Vic) | Mick Headland (SA); Brenton Kerr (Vic) |
| 2022 | Gillman Speedway | Adelaide, SA | Mark Plaisted (SA); Ben Pitt (Vic) | Darrin Treloar (NSW); Blake Cox (NSW) | Mick Headland (SA); Brenton Kerr (Vic) |
| 2023 | RCA Civil Pinjar Park Speedway | Neerabup, WA | Mark Plaisted (SA); Ben Pitt (Vic) | Darrin Treloar (NSW); Blake Cox (NSW) | Warren Monson (Vic); Andrew Summerhayes (Vic) |

Prior to 1961, multiple titles were held in the same year at different tracks over 2, 3 or 4 laps
1950 (4 lap), 1979, 1984 & 1992 - Ride-off to decide winner after tied on points
1998 Results altered at MA tribunal hearing 28 September 1998

== See also ==
- Motorsport in Australia
- List of Australian motor racing series
