= Queensland Solo Championship =

Australian speedway competition

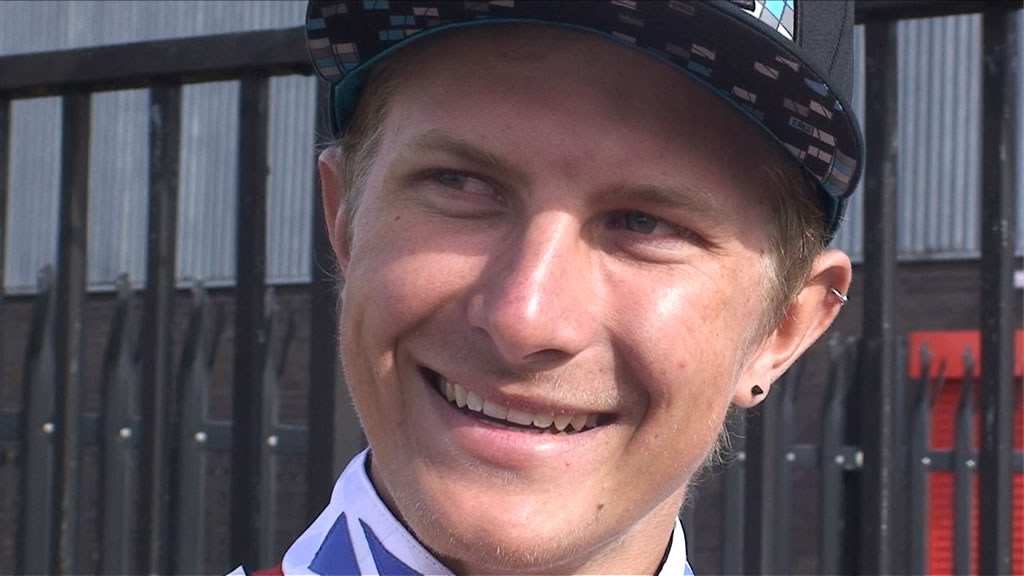
- Josh Grajczonek eight time champion
- Sport: Motorcycle speedway
- Most titles: Josh Grajczonek (8)

The Queensland Solo Championship is a motorcycle speedway championship held annually in Queensland to determine the Queensland State speedway champion. The event is organised by the Motorcycling Queensland and is sanctioned by Motorcycling Australia (MA).

Josh Grajczonek head the list of Championship wins with eight.

Five non Australian riders have won the Queensland Solo title. Rune Sörmander (Sweden), Ivan Mauger (New Zealand), Ken McKinlay (Scotland), Oliver Allen and Josh Auty (England).

== Winners since 1927/28 ==
Unless stated, all riders are from Queensland

Year	Venue	City	Winners
1927/28	Davies Park	Brisbane	Frank Pearce
1928/29	Davies Park	Brisbane	Harold Hastings
1929/30*	Bundamba Showgrounds (2 Miles)	Bundamba	Harold Hastings
1930/31	Not Held		
1939-1945	Not Held due to World War II		
1945/46	Brisbane Exhibition Ground	Brisbane	Archie Neil (NSW)
1946/47	Brisbane Exhibition Ground	Brisbane	Archie Neil (NSW)
1947/48	Not Held		
1948/49	Brisbane Exhibition Ground	Brisbane	Graham Warren (NSW)
1949/50	Brisbane Exhibition Ground	Brisbane	Keith Gurtner
1950/51	Brisbane Exhibition Ground	Brisbane	Lionel Levy (NSW)
1951/52	Brisbane Exhibition Ground	Brisbane	Aub Lawson (NSW)
1952/53	Brisbane Exhibition Ground	Brisbane	Jack Young (SA)
1953/54	Brisbane Exhibition Ground	Brisbane	Rune Sörmander ( (Sweden) )
1954/55	Not Held		
1955/56	Brisbane Exhibition Ground; Toowoomba Showgrounds [3 Lap]	Brisbane; Toowoomba	Aub Lawson (NSW); Aub Lawson (NSW)
1956/57	Brisbane Exhibition Ground	Brisbane	Keith Gurtner
1957/58	Brisbane Exhibition Ground	Brisbane	Keith Cox
1958/59	Not Held		
1959/60	Brisbane Exhibition Ground	Brisbane	Keith Gurtner
1960/61	Rockhampton Showground	Rockhampton	Keith Gurtner
1961/62	Brisbane Exhibition Ground; Rockhampton Showground	Brisbane; Rockhampton	Keith Gurtner; Ivan Mauger ( (New Zealand) )
1962/63	Not Held		
1963/64	Brisbane Exhibition Ground	Brisbane	Ken McKinlay ( (Scotland) )
1964/65	Brisbane Exhibition Ground	Brisbane	Keith Gurtner
1965/66	Not Held		
1966/67	Brisbane Exhibition Ground; Carina Speedway (3 Lap)	Brisbane; Bundaberg	Keith Gurtner; Jack White
1967/68	Rockhampton Showground; Ipswich Showgrounds (3 Lap)	Rockhampton; Ipswich	Bluey Scott; Jack White
1968/69	Brisbane Exhibition Ground	Brisbane	Kevin Torpie (Vic)
1969/70	Brisbane Exhibition Ground; Ipswich Showgrounds (3 Lap)	Brisbane; Ipswich	Jim Airey (NSW); Jim Airey (NSW)
1970/71	Brisbane Exhibition Ground; Ipswich Showgrounds (3 Lap)	Brisbane; Ipswich	Bert Kingston; Bert Kingston
1971/72	Brisbane Exhibition Ground	Brisbane	Jack White
1972/73	Brisbane Exhibition Ground	Brisbane	Steve Reinke
1973/74	Brisbane Exhibition Ground	Brisbane	Steve Reinke
1974/75 & 1975/76 not held
1976/77	Pioneer Park Speedway	Ayr	Steve Koppe
1977/78	Charlton Raceway	Toowoomba	John Titman
1978/79	Charlton Raceway	Toowoomba	John Titman
1979/80	Pioneer Park Speedway	Ayr	John Titman
1980/81	Rockhampton Showground	Rockhampton	John Titman
1981/82	Pioneer Park Speedway	Ayr	Steve Koppe
1982/83	Rockhampton Showground	Rockhampton	John Titman
1983/84	Mothar Mountain Speedway	Gympie	John Titman
1984/85	Pioneer Park Speedway	Ayr	Steve Regeling
1985/86	Pioneer Park Speedway	Ayr	John Titman
1986/87	Townsville Speedway	Townsville	Steve Regeling
1987/88	Rockhampton Showground	Rockhampton	Steve Regeling
1988/89	Rockhampton Showground	Rockhampton	Troy Butler
1989/90	Townsville Speedway	Townsville	Troy Butler
1990/91	Mac's Speedway	Mackay	Troy Butler
1991/92	Brisbane Exhibition Ground	Brisbane	Troy Butler
1992/93	Townsville Speedway	Townsville	Troy Butler
1993/94	Brisbane Exhibition Ground	Brisbane	Troy Butler
1994/95	Brisbane Exhibition Ground	Brisbane	Jason Crump
1995/96	Townsville Speedway	Townsville	Tony Langdon
1996/97	Rockhampton Showground	Rockhampton	Jason Crump
1997/98	Brisbane Exhibition Ground	Brisbane	Jason Crump
1998/99	Gladstone Speedway	Gladstone	Steve Viner
1999/2000	Gold Coast Speedway	Gold Coast	Brent Collyer
2000/01	Gold Coast Speedway	Gold Coast	Jason Crump
2001/02	Rockhampton Showground	Rockhampton	Jon White
2002/03	Gold Coast Speedway	Gold Coast	Scott Smith
2003/04	Gold Coast Speedway	Gold Coast	Jason Crump
2004/05	Gatton Showgrounds	Gatton	Davey Watt
2005/06	Gold Coast Speedway	Gold Coast	Oliver Allen ( (England) )
2006/07	Pioneer Park Speedway	Ayr	Troy Batchelor
2007/08	Gold Coast Speedway	Gold Coast	Scott Smith
2008/09	Pioneer Park Speedway	Ayr	Josh Grajczonek
2009/10	North Brisbane Speedway	Brisbane	Josh Auty ( (England) )
2010/11	Pioneer Park Speedway	Ayr	Josh Grajczonek
2011/12	North Brisbane Speedway	Brisbane	Josh Grajczonek
2012/13	Pioneer Park Speedway	Ayr	Josh Grajczonek
2013/14	Townsville Speedway	Townsville	Josh Grajczonek
2014/15	Pioneer Park Speedway	Ayr	Josh Grajczonek
2015/16	Rockhampton Showground	Rockhampton	Mason Campton
2016/17	North Brisbane Speedway	Brisbane	Davey Watt
2017/18	Maryborough Speedway	Maryborough	Jake Allen
2018/19	Pioneer Park Speedway	Ayr	Hugh Skidmore
2019/20	North Brisbane Speedway	Banyo	Ryan Douglas
2020/21	Bowen Showgrounds	Bowen	Josh Grajczonek
2021/22	North Brisbane Speedway	Banyo	Nick Morris
2022/23	Bowen Showgrounds	Bowen	Ryan Douglas
2023/24	Pioneer Park Speedway	Ayr	Josh Grajczonek
2024/25	North Brisbane Speedway	Banyo	cancelled due to bad weather
2025/26	Pioneer Park Speedway	Ayr	Zaine Kennedy

== See also ==
- Australian Solo Championship
- New South Wales Individual Speedway Championship
- Western Australian Individual Speedway Championship
- Victorian Individual Speedway Championship
- South Australian Individual Speedway Championship
