= Keith Gurtner =

Former Australian motorcycle speedway rider

- Born: 21 September 1921; Wagga Wagga, Australia
- Died: 21 April 1997 (aged 75); Brisbane, Australia
- Nationality: Australian

Career history
- 1948: Exeter Falcons
- 1948: Newcastle Diamonds
- 1949–1950: Ashfield Giants
- 1951–1952: Motherwell Eagles
- 1952: Edinburgh Monarchs
- 1953–1954: West Ham Hammers

Individual honours
- 1950, 1957, 1960 1961, 1962, 1965 1967: Queensland champion

Keith Frank Gurtner (21 September 1921 – 21 April 1997) was an Australian motorcycle speedway rider. He was the champion of Queensland a record equalling seven times in 1974 and earned 26 international caps for the Australia national speedway team.

== Biography ==
Gurtner, born in Wagga Wagga, was a junior speedskater and amateur boxer before racing on the grasstracks in 1939. He served during World War II, before racing speedway in 1946. He suffered a major injury breaking his arm, ankle and several ribs. However, he came to the notice of British clubs in 1947 and the Exeter Falcons manager Frank Buckland signed him in January 1948. However, he was exchanged with Bonny Waddell of Newcastle Diamonds shortly afterwards.

The following season in 1949, Gurtner joined Ashfield Giants in Glasgow. In 1950, he won the first of his seven Queensland Solo Championship wins.

In 1951, Gurtner left Ashfield for fellow Scottish club Motherwell Eagles and recorded a respectable 8.37 average. In the late August 1952, Gurtner transferred to Edinburgh Monarchs.

Gurtner finished his British leagues career in London, with West Ham Hammers from 1953 to 1954 but he continued to ride in Australia and was made captain of the Australian side in 1960.

Gurtner won the bronze medal at the Australian Solo Championship in 1962 and the silver medal the following year, both times at the Rockhampton Showgrounds.

Gurtner went on to win his seventh State title in 1967 and raced for the final time on 5 June 1971, shortly before his 50th birthday and having broken 52 bones throughout his 30-year career.
