= Broadford =

Broadford may refer to:

== Places ==
- Broadford, Victoria, Australia, a small town
- Broadford, County Clare, Ireland, a village
- Broadford, County Limerick, Ireland, a village
- Broadford, Skye, Scotland, a village
- Broadford, Surrey, a location near Guildford, England
- Broadford, Pennsylvania, United States
- Broadford, Virginia, United States
- Shire of Broadford, a former local government area of Victoria, Australia

== Other ==
- Broadford Airfield on the Isle of Skye, Scotland
- Broadford Football Netball Club, an Australian Rules Football club in Victoria, Australia
- Broadford GAA, Gaelic Athletic Association club in County Kildare, Ireland
- Broadford railway station, Victoria, Australia
- Broadford Track, a motorcycle racing venue in Victoria, Australia
