= Warren Monson =

Australian speedway rider (1976–2023)

- Born: 4 March 1975; Mildura, Victoria, Australia
- Died: 23 April 2023 (aged 48); Heathcote Park Raceway, Victoria, Australia
- Nickname: Wazza
- Nationality: Australian

Career history
- 2000-2023: Australia

Full Noize Racing

Individual honours
- 2017, 2019: FIM Speedway Sidecar World Cup Winner
- 2017, 2019: FIM Oceania Speedway Sidecar Champion
- 2004, 2011, 2012, 2013, 2014, 2015, 2021, 2022, 2023: Victorian Sidecar Champion

Warren Monson (4 March 1975 – 23 April 2023) was an Australian sidecar speedway rider. He won the FIM Speedway Sidecar World Cup, FIM Oceania Speedway Sidecar Championships and was nine times Victorian champion.

== Career ==
Born in Mildura, Victoria, Monson began his speedway career at Mildura's Olympic Park Speedway where as of 2023 holds the track record for the 1000cc sidecar category. A member of Mildura Motorcycle Club, Monson built and raced his own bikes and holds the record for the most Victorian sidecar championship wins.

Sidecar passengers during Monson's racing career include Scott Cameron, Marty Underwood, Deven Gates, Matt Morgan, and Andrew Summerhayes.

Monson competed at Speed Week 2023 with the Dry Lakes Racers Australia, where he received his 200mph cap on his Suzuki Hayabusa.

Off the track, Monson was a race engineer and mechanic for Suzuki and then Yamaha, working on bikes for multiple Australian superbike champions. Monson was well-known for his work with Shawn Giles, Troy Herfoss, Josh Waters, Markus Chiodo and especially Wayne Maxwell.

Monson died on 23 April 2023 in a motorcycle crash at an event at Heathcote Park Raceway in Knowsley in central Victoria. He was 48.

== Major results ==
=== World Championships ===
FIM Speedway Sidecar World Cup

- 2017 - Gillman, South Australia, Gillman Speedway - 1st
- 2019 - Gillman, South Australia, Gillman Speedway - 1st

=== Regional Championships ===
FIM Oceania Speedway Sidecar Championship

- 2015 - Gillman, South Australia, Gillman Speedway - 3rd
- 2017 - Gillman, South Australia, Gillman Speedway - 1st
- 2019 - Gillman, South Australia, Gillman Speedway - 1st

=== Australian Domestic Championships ===
Australian Sidecar Championship

- 2003 - Mildura, Victoria, Olympic Park Speedway - 3rd
- 2015 - Alice Springs, Northern Territory, Arunga Park Speedway - 2nd
- 2017 - Gillman, South Australia, Gillman Speedway - 3rd
- 2019 - Ayr, Queensland, Pioneer Park Speedway - 2nd
- 2021 - Mildura, Victoria, Olympic Park Speedway - 2nd
- 2023 - Neerabup, Western Australia, RCA Civil Pinjar Park Speedway - 3rd

Victorian Sidecar Championship

- 2001 - Mildura, Victoria, Olympic Park Speedway - 3rd
- 2004 - Undera, Victoria, Undera Park Speedway - 1st
- 2006 - Mildura, Victoria, Olympic Park Speedway - 3rd
- 2011 - Broadford, Victoria, Broadford Speedway - 1st
- 2012 - Wangaratta, Victoria, Speedway Wangaratta - 1st
- 2013 - Mildura, Victoria, Olympic Park Speedway - 1st
- 2014 - Undera, Victoria, Undera Park Speedway - 1st
- 2015 - Mildura, Victoria, Olympic Park Speedway - 1st
- 2021 - Mildura, Victoria, Olympic Park Speedway - 1st
- 2022 - Mildura, Victoria, Olympic Park Speedway - 1st
- 2023 - Mildura, Victoria, Olympic Park Speedway - 1st

== See also ==
- Grasstrack
