= Banyo =

Banyo may refer to:

- Banyo, Cameroon, a town and commune in Mbéré Department, Adamawa Province, Cameroon
- Banyo, Queensland, a suburb of Brisbane, Queensland, Australia
  - Banyo railway station

== See also ==
- Bagnio, a loan word into English with several meanings
