= Nudgee =

Nudgee can refer to:

- Nudgee, Queensland (Suburb of Brisbane, Australia)
- St. Joseph's Nudgee College, Brisbane, Australia
- Electoral district of Nudgee, Queensland, Australia
