= Nudgee Beach =

- Suburb
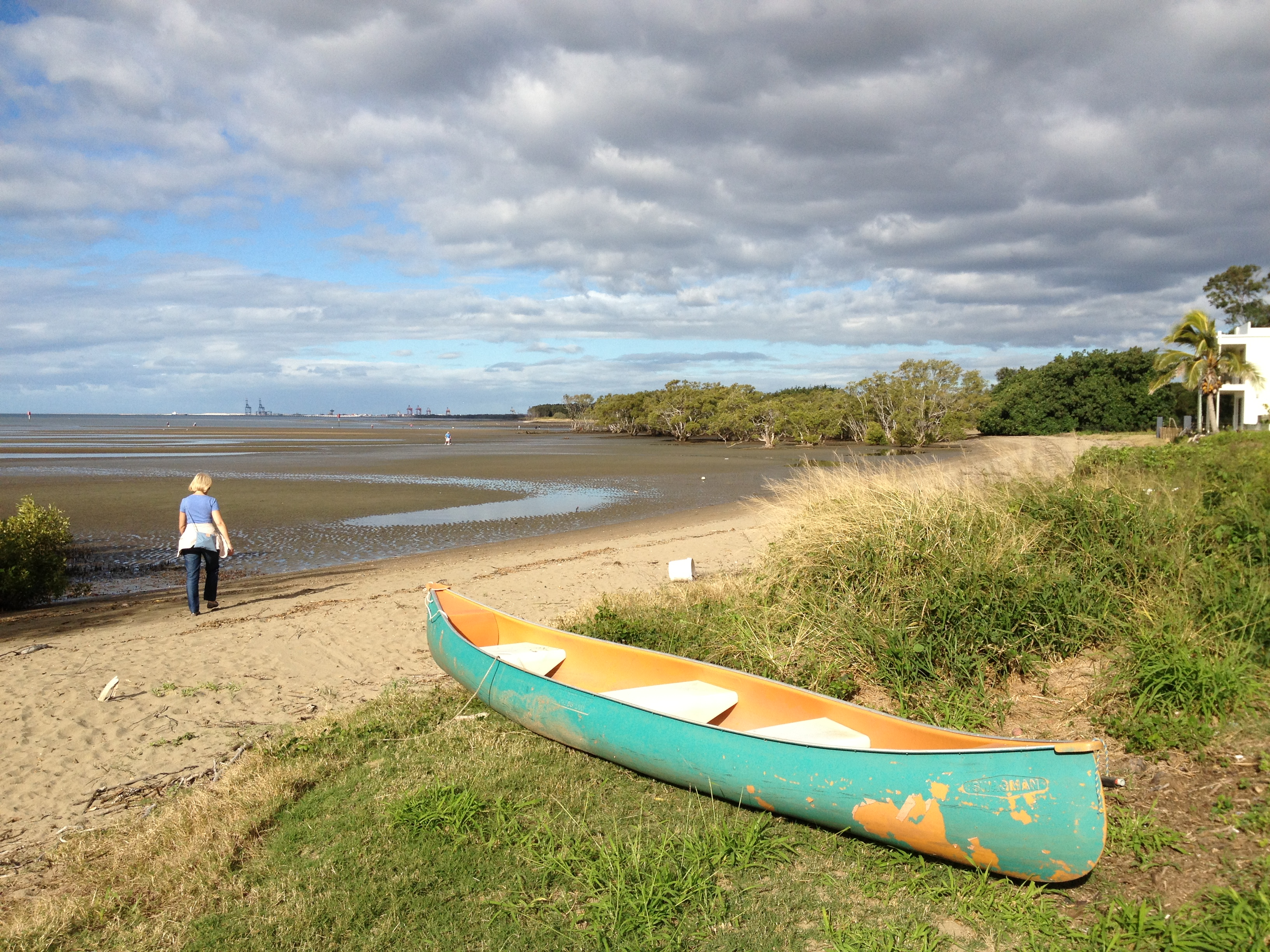
- The beach at low tide, 2013

- Interactive map of Nudgee Beach
- Coordinates: 27.3539°S 153.0968°E
- Country: Australia
- State: Queensland
- City: Brisbane
- LGA: City of Brisbane (Northgate Ward)
- Location: 17.9 km (11.1 mi) NW of Brisbane CBD

Government
  - State electorate: Nudgee
  - Federal division: Lilley

Area
  - Total: 6.6 km^{2} (2.5 sq mi)

Population
  - Total: 308 (2021 census)
  - Density: 46.7/km^{2} (120.9/sq mi)
- Time zone: UTC+10:00 (AEST)
- Postcode: 4014
Suburbs around Nudgee Beach
Shorncliffe	Moreton Bay	Moreton Bay
Boondall	Nudgee Beach	Moreton Bay
Nudgee	Brisbane Airport	Brisbane Airport

Nudgee Beach is a suburb and beach in the City of Brisbane, Queensland, Australia. In the 2021 census, Nudgee Beach had a population of 308 people.

== Geography ==
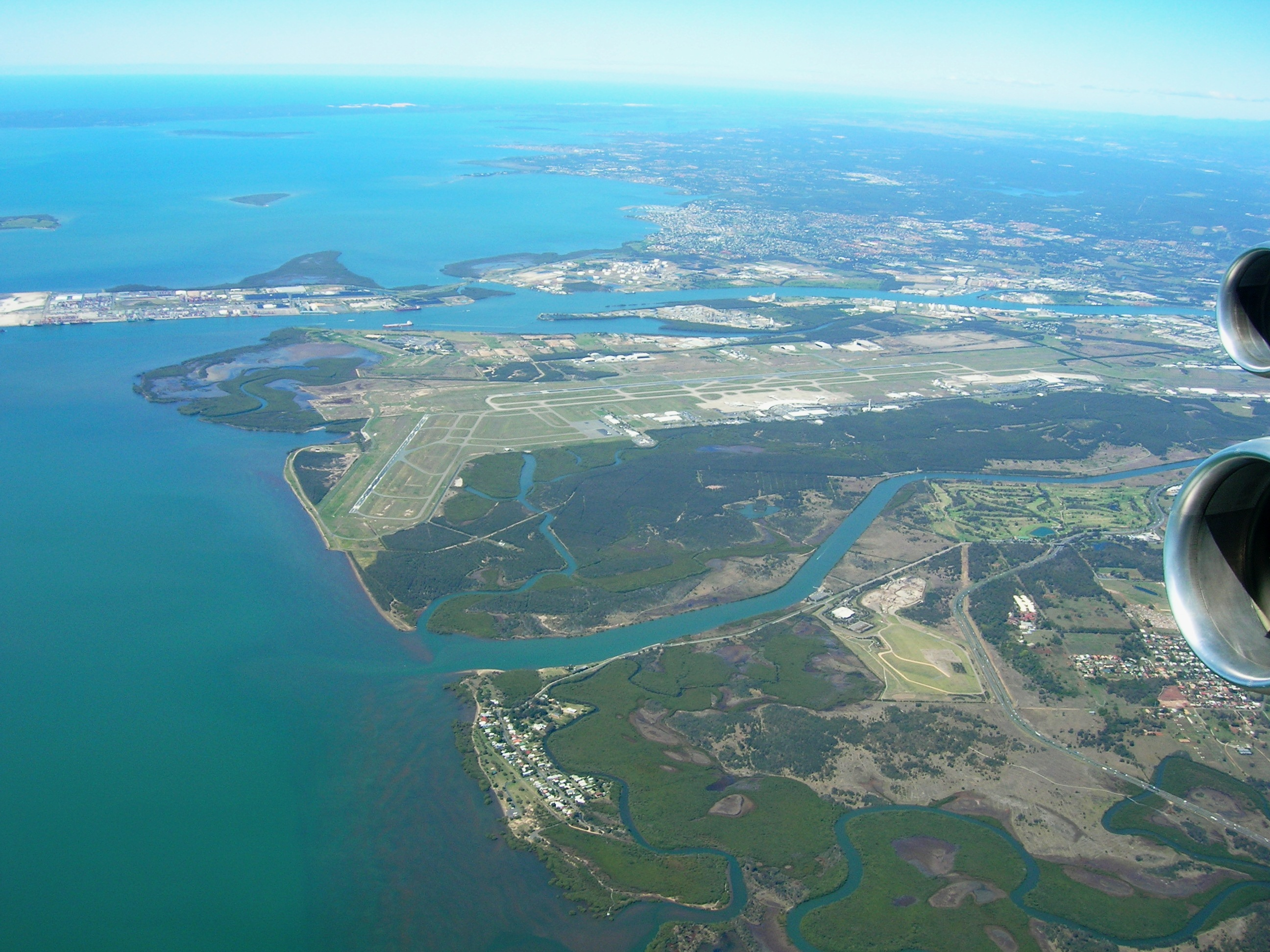
Aerial view of Nudgee Beach (foreground), Kedron Brook, Brisbane Airport, 2006

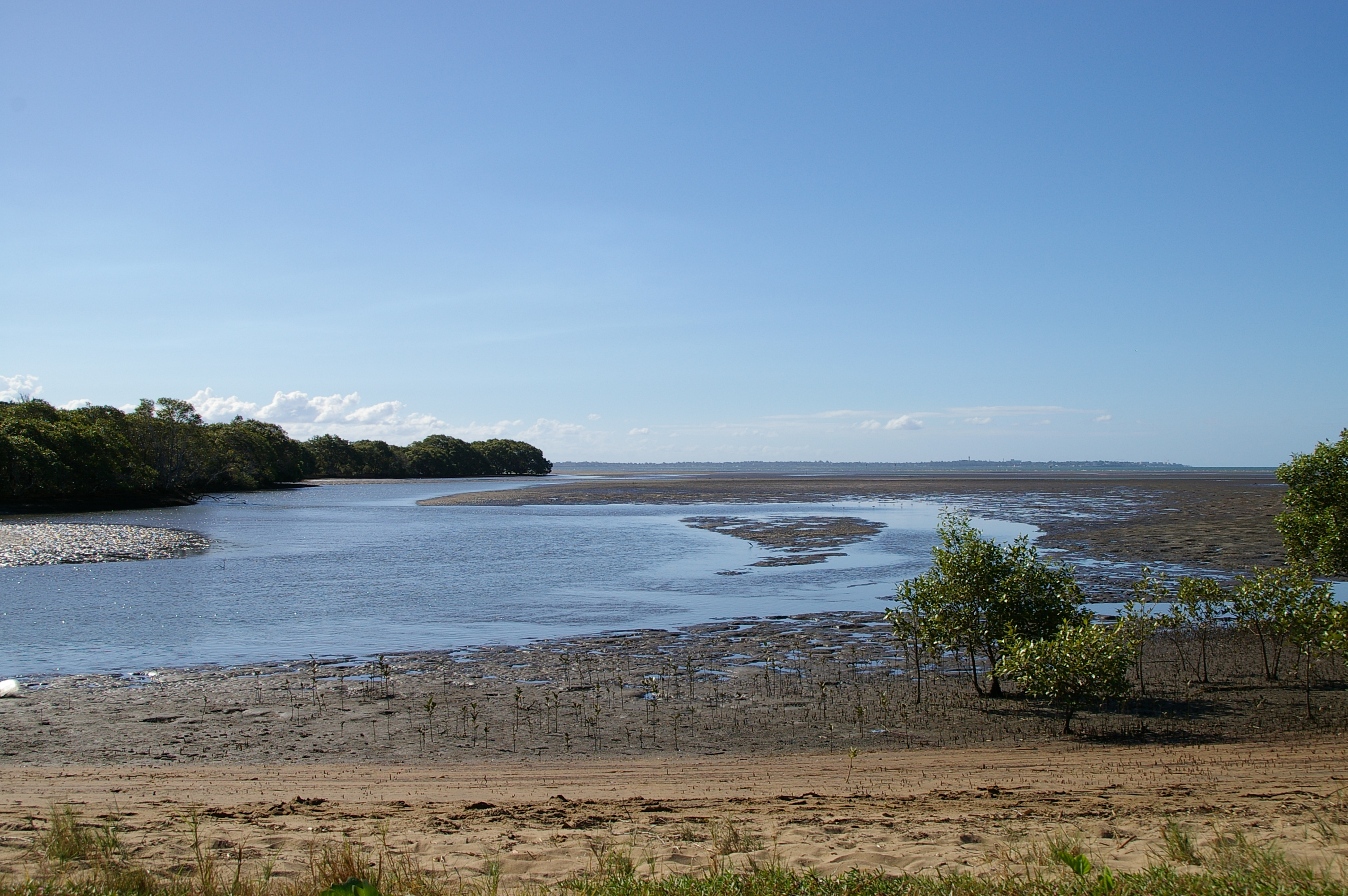
Mouth of Nudgee Creek

The suburb is 17.9 kilometres (11 mi) north-west of the Brisbane central business district. The suburb is bounded to the north-east by Moreton Bay, to the south-west by Kedron Brook (27.3731°S 153.1065°E), to the south-west by the Gateway Motorway, and to the north-west by Nundah Creek (27.3357°S 153.0836°E). Directly to the south is Brisbane Airport.

Nudgee Creek rises in Nudgee to the west and meanders through Nudgee Beach where it enters Moreton Bay at 27.3429°S 153.0941°E.

There is a small residential area (27.3459°S 153.1026°E) in the east of the suburb near the beach (27.3433°S 153.1009°E).

There is a Brisbane City Council waste transfer station (known by the council as a resource recovery centre) in the south of the locality (27.3612°S 153.1003°E). The remainder of the locality is mangrove wetlands with the northern part of the suburb being part of the Boondall Wetlands.

There is a network of bike tracks which connect through to Toombul shopping centre.

== History ==
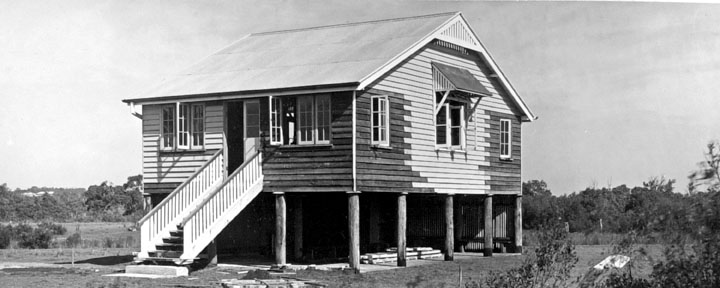
Nudgee Beach State School additions, July 1950

The name Nudgee comes from the Yuggera word in the Yugarabul dialect, nardha meaning place of ducks, from nar meaning duck and dha meaning place.

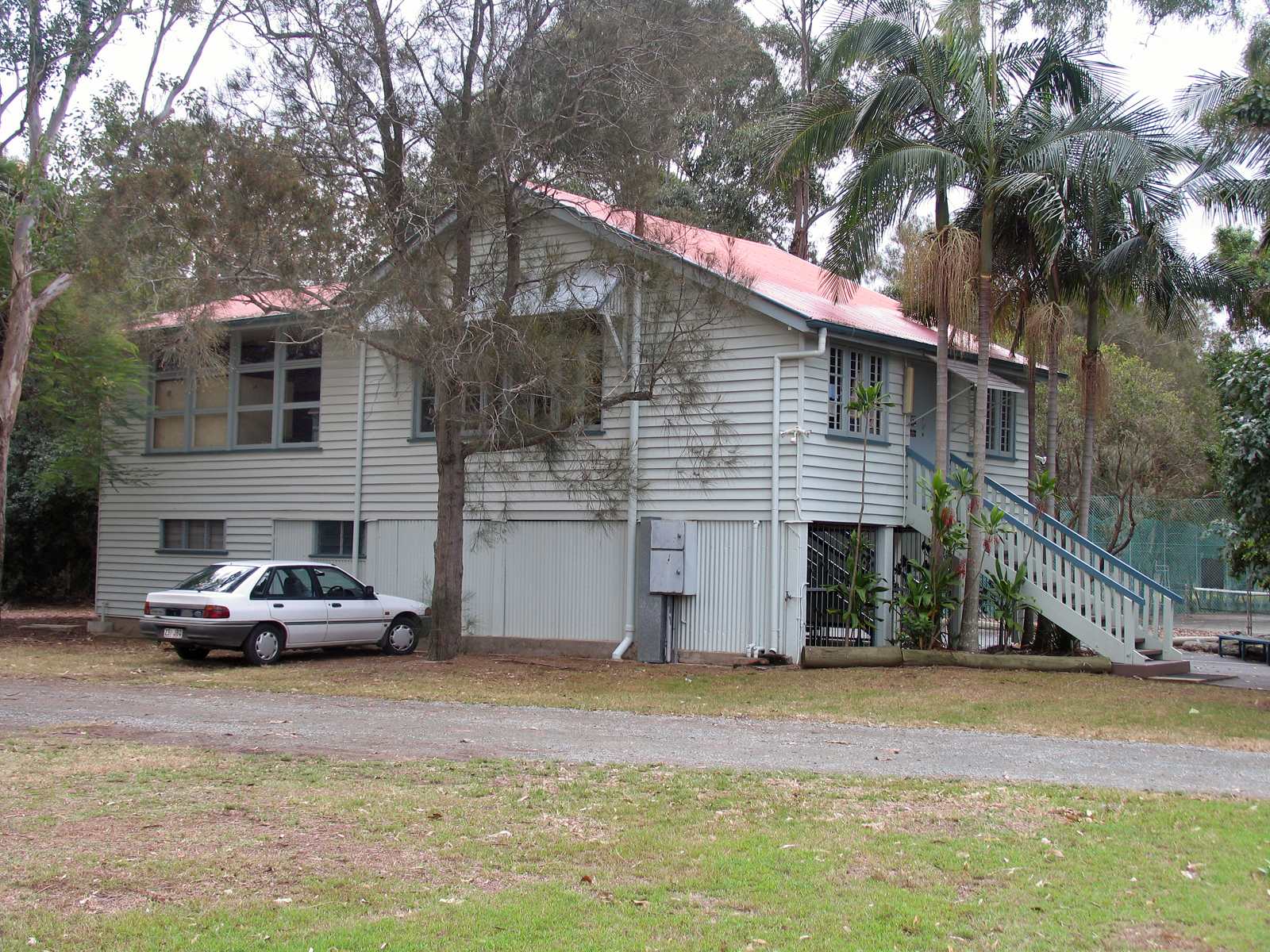
Former Nudgee Beach State School, 2006

Nudgee Beach Provisional School opened on 1 April 1926. In 1946, it became Nudgee Beach State School in the former Woolooman State School building which was relocated to Nudgee Beach. It closed on 25 March 1988. In 1989, the school building reopened as Nudgee Beach Field Study Centre. In 1992, it was renamed Nudgee Beach Environmental Education Centre.

== Demographics ==
At the 2011 census, Nudgee Beach had a population of 261 people. In the 2011 census, Nudgee Beach had a population of 261 people; 48.7% female and 51.3% male. The median age of the Nudgee Beach population was 45 years of age, 8 years above the Australian median. Children aged under 15 years made up 13.8% of the population and people aged 65 years and over made up 17.7% of the population. 77.9% of people living in Nudgee Beach were born in Australia, compared to the national average of 69.8%; the next most common countries of birth were England 4.6%, New Zealand 4.2%, Ireland 2.7%, Germany 1.1%, Papua New Guinea 1.1%. 88.8% of people spoke only English at home; the next most popular languages were 1.9% German, 1.9% Vietnamese, 1.5% Thai, 1.2% Pacific Austronesian Languages. The median weekly household income in Nudgee Beach was $1,224, very similar to the national median of $1,234. Nearly all households in Nudgee Beach (97.0%) were separate houses, there were no semi-detached, row or terrace houses, townhouses etc., and no flats, units or apartments, and 3.0% were classified as "other dwellings". The average household size was 2.5 people.

In the 2016 census, Nudgee Beach had a population of 263 people.

In the 2021 census, Nudgee Beach had a population of 308 people.

== Education ==
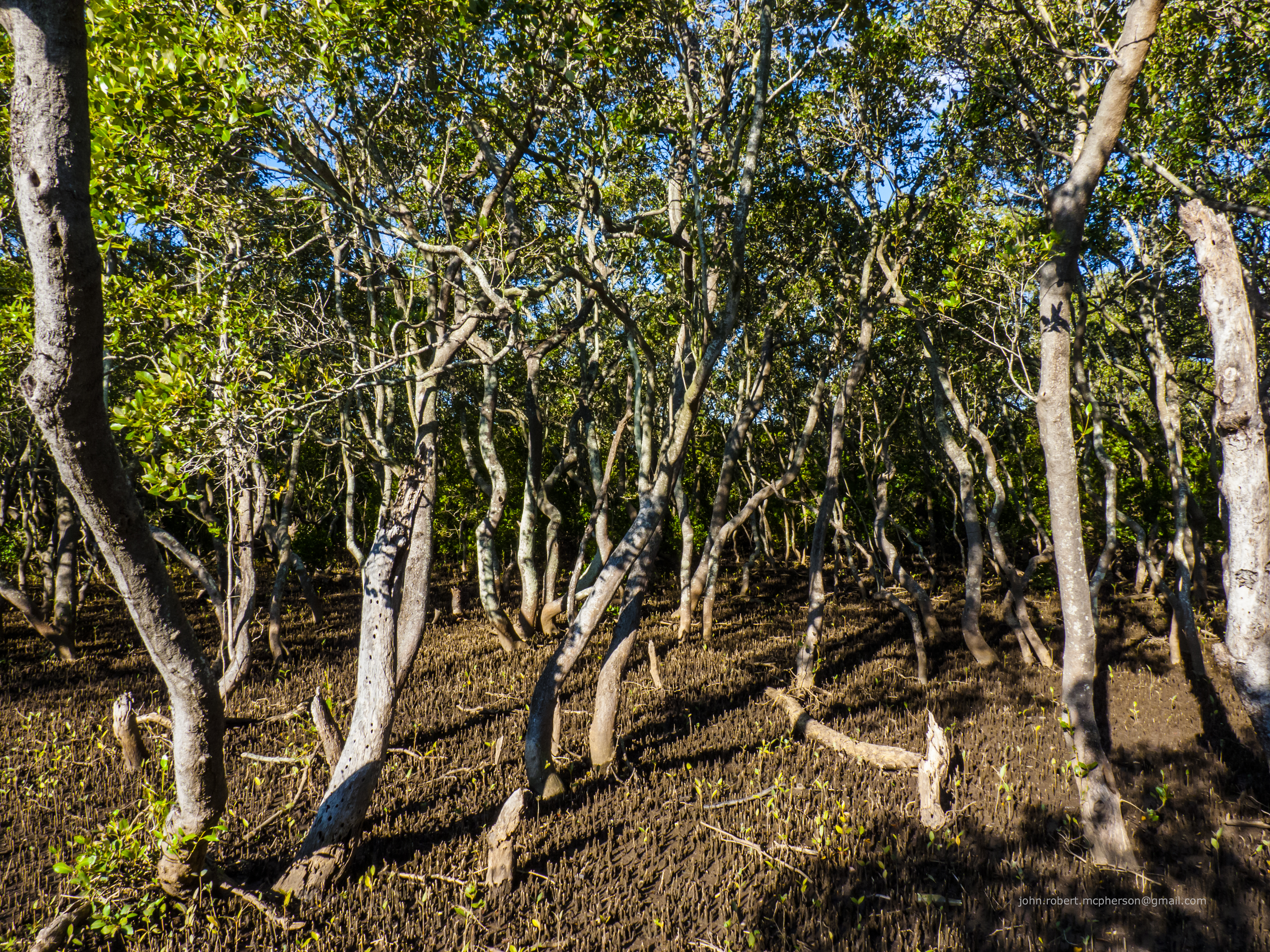
Grey mangroves (Avicennia marina) predominate around Nudgee Creek

Nudgee Beach Environmental Education Centre is an Outdoor and Environmental Education Centre at 1588 Nudgee Road (27.3482°S 153.1049°E).

There are no schools in Nudgee Beach. The nearest primary and secondary school is Earnshaw State College in Banyo.

== Amenities ==
There is a boat ramp and floating walkway at Nudgee Beach Road (27.3627°S 153.1029°E) providing access to Kedron Brook.

There are four canoe ramps:

- from Fortitude Street into Moreton Bay (27.3435°S 153.1010°E)
- from O'Quinn Street into Nudgee Creek (27.3450°S 153.0978°E)
- from Mangrove boardwalk into Nudgee Creek (27.3444°S 153.0931°E)
- from Boondall Wetlands into Nundah Creek (27.3448°S 153.0920°E)
