= Steve Reinke (speedway rider) =

Former Australian motorcycle speedway rider

- Born: 3 April 1949 (age 77); Ipswich, Queensland, Australia
- Nationality: Australian

Career history
- 1974–1975: Exeter Falcons

Individual honours
- 1974: Australian champion
- 1973, 1974: Queensland champion

Team honours
- 1974: UK League champion

Stephen John Reinke (born 3 April 1949) is an Australian former motorcycle speedway rider. He was the champion of Australia in 1974 and earned 16 international caps for the Australia national speedway team.

== Biography ==
Reinke, born in Ipswich, Queensland, became the Australian champion after winning the Australian Solo Championship in 1974.

Reinke soon became the Australian test team captain and was quickly coveted by the British teams, signing for Exeter Falcons despite an offer from Coventry Bees. He began his British leagues career during the 1974 British League season, where he helped the team from Devon win the league title.

The following season in 1975, Reinke continued to ride for Exeter and averaged 6.07.

Unlike most Australian riders, Reinke chose not to continue to ride in Britain due to his business commitments. He was also Queensland champion in 1973 and 1974.
