= Melbourne Speedbowl =

Speedway stadium in Brooklyn, Victoria, Australia

- Location: Brooklyn, Victoria, Australia
- Coordinates: 37°50′34″S 144°47′03″E
- Opened: circa.1965

Melbourne Speedbowl (also known by several other names) was a motorsport venue, located on Geelong Road in Brooklyn, Victoria, Australia. The site today is industrial buildings on Fleet Street in Laverton North.

== History ==
The site which was originally a greyhound racing track was owned by a Mr. Wilson and he built a speedway track, which he named Brooklyn Speedway, with the intention of running Dirt track racing. In 1965, it was bought by three businessmen for A$ 250,000 and later opened for hot rods and stock cars.

The venue then saw motorcycle speedway and sidecars introduced, the solo track record was set by riders such as Eric Boocock and Bert Harkins during 1968.

Various promoters took over the track and it was renamed several times.

The track became a significant venue for important events, including qualifying rounds of the Speedway World Championship starting in 1976 and the Victorian Individual Speedway Championship on eleven occasions from 1966 to 1981.

== Names and years ==
- Brooklyn Speedway (?–1965)
- Melbourne Speedway (1965–1972)
- Northern Park Raceway (1972–1978) promoted by Phil Page
- U.S.A.C Brooklyn Speedway (1978–1979) promoted by Paul Camilleri
- Western International Raceway (1980–1982) promoted by Mick & Glenda King
- The Melbourne Speedbowl (1982–1988) promoted byr Richard Newnham
