= Ipswich Showgrounds =

Showground in Ipswich, Queensland, Australia

- Interactive map of Ipswich Showgrounds
- Location: Ipswich Showgrounds, Ipswich, Queensland 4305, Australia
- Coordinates: 27°37′45″S 152°45′30″E

Construction
- Opened: 1877

Ipswich Showgrounds is an outdoor recreational area located off Salisbury Road, Warwick Road and Parker Avenue, in Ipswich, Queensland, Australia. It hosts the Ipswich Show, organised by the Ipswich Show Society. Included within the Showgrounds is the greyhound racing track run by the Ipswich Greyhound Racing Club, the Ipswich Indoor Sports Centre, the Boulevard Function Room & Terrace, the Ipswich Eight Ball Association and Circus Ipswich.

== History ==
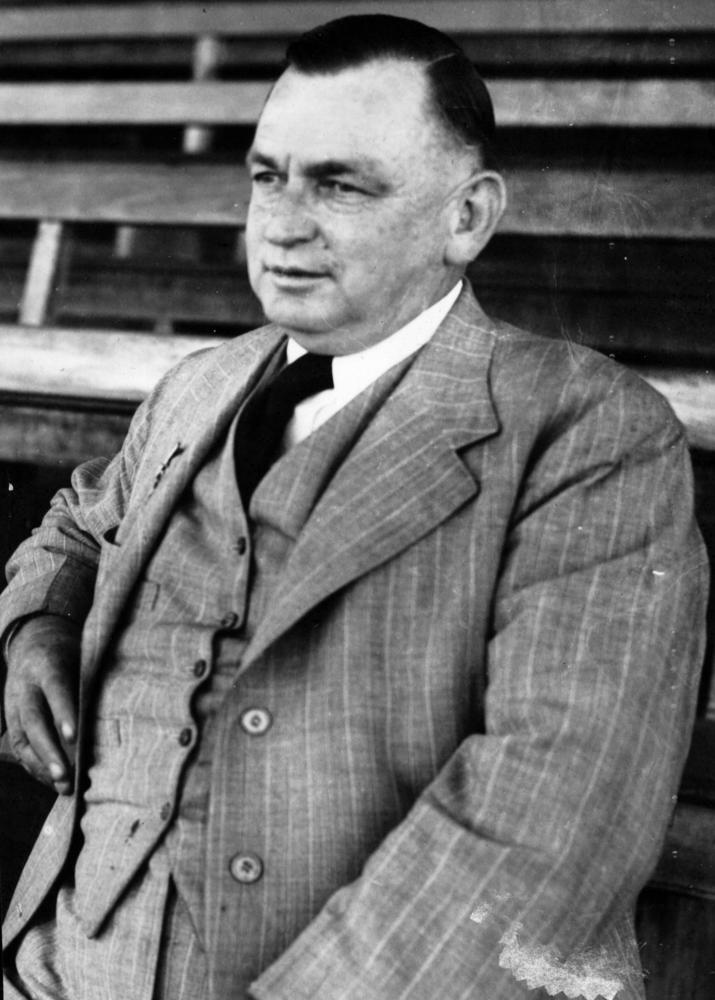
Fred Hooper, President of the Ipswich Show during the 1950s

The Showgrounds were first used by the Queensland Pastoral and Agricultural Society in 1877.

On 11 May 1940, a memorial was erected by the gates of the Showgrounds on Warwick Road. They commemorate the 12 people lost at sea in June 1939, when the 45ft motor boat Nerita disappeared.

Motorcycle speedway made its debut at the Showgrounds during 1950. It hosted the Queensland Solo Championship three times (1967, 1969 and 1970).

During the 1970s, the speedway track also saw sedan cars racing around the circuit.

In 1973, the greyhound racing track opened. The track has a circumference of 444 metres and race distances are 431m, 520m, 630m and 732m. The speedway track closed shortly afterwards in 1974.

In 1977, the 100th anniversary of the first show took place and in recent years the site has provided a caravan park with ameneties.
