= Broadford Track =

Motorcycle racing venue in Victoria, Australia

Broadford State Motorcycle Sports Complex
- Location: Hume Freeway, Victoria
- Coordinates: 37°12′58″S 145°4′59″E
- Capacity: 4,000
- Owner: Motorcycling Victoria
- Operator: Motorcycling Victoria
- Opened: 1975

Full Circuit (1975–present)
- Length: 2.16 km (1.34 mi)
- Turns: 12
- Race lap record: 54.94 (Lucas Stasi, Hyper Racer X1, 2023)

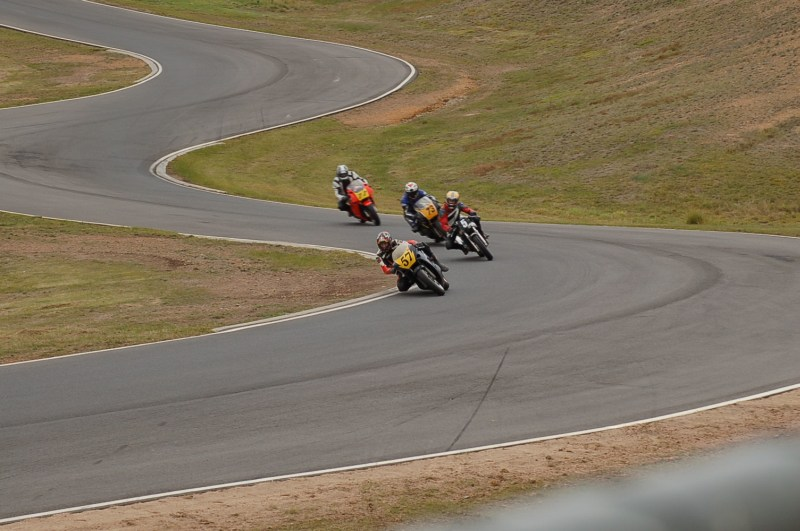
Broadford Track

Broadford Track is the popular name of Broadford State Motorcycle Sports Complex in Victoria, Australia. It is located along Hume Freeway, approximately 88-kilometre (55 mi) from Melbourne near the town of Broadford.

Opened in 1975, Broadford Road Circuit (there are 8 tracks in this 96-hectare complex) is 2.16 km (1.34 mi) long and 10 m (33 ft) wide within Reg Hunt Park. It is primarily used for motorcycle racing, but is also used for car testing, although car racing is restricted to motorcycle-engined vehicles due to planning restrictions and the lack of a track circuit licence. It is located 88 kilometres (55 mi) north of Melbourne, on the Strath Creek Rd, Broadford (Just off Hume Freeway). The complex also includes a Motocross track.

In 2014, Motorcycle Victoria leased part of the unused land in the complex to Calibre Sports Inc., a handgun target shooting club who have set up a new range.

== Motorcycle speedway ==
The State Motorcycle Complex also has a 400 m (440 yd) motorcycle speedway track (37°12′44″S 145°05′10″E). On the infield of the speedway is a 120 m (130 yd) junior speedway track. The track has hosted the Victorian Individual Speedway Championship on five occasions:

- 2002/03 won by Travis McGowan
- 2005/06 won by Cameron Woodward
- 2009/10 won by Ty Proctor
- 2016/17 won by Troy Batchelor
- 2021/22 won by Justin Sedgmen
