= Victorian Individual Speedway Championship =

Australian speedway competition

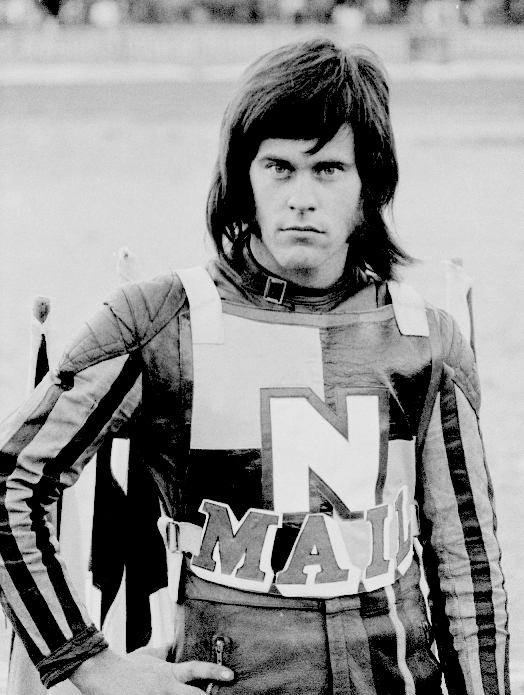
- Phil Crump, 13 time champion
- Sport: Motorcycle speedway
- Founded: 1926
- Most titles: Phil Crump (13)

The Victorian Individual Speedway Championship is a Motorcycle speedway championship held annually in Australia's southernmost mainland state of Victoria to determine the State champion. The event is organised by the Motorcycling Victoria and is sanctioned by Motorcycling Australia (MA).

Phil Crump holds the record for the most wins having won 13 Victorian Championships between 1972 and 1988.

Seven international riders have won the Victorian Championship. They are Larry Boulton (England - 1933), Ulf Ericsson (Sweden - 1955), Gerry Hussey (England - 1956), Ken McKinlay (Scotland - 1959 & 1961), Ivan Mauger (New Zealand - 1962 & 1963), Roy Trigg (England - 1966, 1969 & 1970) and Bert Harkins (Scotland - 1968).

== Winners since 1926/27 ==
Unless stated, all riders are from Victoria

Year	Venue	City	Winners
1926/27	Geelong Velodrome	Geelong	Billy Pilgrim
1927/28	Geelong Velodrome	Geelong	Billy Pilgrim
1928/29	Exhibition Speedway	Melbourne	Cliff Bounds
1929/30	Exhibition Speedway	Melbourne	Billy Pilgrim
1930/31	Exhibition Speedway	Melbourne	Frank Apted
1931/32	Exhibition Speedway	Melbourne	Fred Tracey
1932/33	Exhibition Speedway	Melbourne	Larry Boulton ( (England) )
1933/34	Exhibition Speedway	Melbourne	Ernie Evans
1934/35	Exhibition Speedway	Melbourne	Ernie Evans
1935/36	Not Held		
1936/37	Olympic Park Speedway	Melbourne	Clem Mitchell (SA)
1937/38	Not Held		
1938/39	Not Held		
1939/40	Olympic Park Speedway	Melbourne	Bill Rogers
1940-1946	Not Held due to World War II		
1946/47	Tracey's Speedway	Melbourne	Lionel Van Praag (NSW)
1947/48	Tracey's Speedway	Melbourne	Jack Biggs
1948/49	Tracey's Speedway	Melbourne	Ron Hyde
1949/50	Tracey's Speedway	Melbourne	Harry Down
1950/51	Not Held		
1951/52	Tracey's Speedway	Melbourne	Bernie McCoy
1952/53	Tracey's Speedway	Melbourne	Ken Walsh
1953/54	Tracey's Speedway	Melbourne	Jack Biggs
1954/55	Tracey's Speedway	Melbourne	Ulf Ericsson ( (Sweden) )
1955/56	Tracey's Speedway	Melbourne	Gerry Hussey ( (England) )
1956/57	Tracey's Speedway	Melbourne	Jack Young (SA)
1957/58	Tracey's Speedway	Melbourne	Peter Moore
1958/59	Tracey's Speedway	Melbourne	Ken McKinlay ( (Scotland) )
1959/60	Not Held		
1960/61	Tracey's Speedway	Melbourne	Ken McKinlay ( (Scotland) )
1961/62	Tracey's Speedway	Melbourne	Ivan Mauger ( (New Zealand) )
1962/63	Tracey's Speedway	Melbourne	Ivan Mauger ( (New Zealand) )
1963/64	N/A	N/A	Jack Scott (SA)
1964/65	N/A	N/A	Jack Scott (SA)
1965/66	N/A	N/A	Roy Trigg ( (England) )
1966/67	Melbourne Speedway	Melbourne	Kevin Torpie
1967/68	Melbourne Speedway	Melbourne	Bert Harkins ( (Scotland) )
1968/69	Melbourne Speedway	Melbourne	Roy Trigg ( (England) )
1969/70	Melbourne Speedway	Melbourne	Roy Trigg ( (England) )
1970/71	N/A	N/A	Jim Airey (NSW)
1971/72	Olympic Park Speedway	Mildura	Phil Crump
1972/73	Melbourne Speedway	Melbourne	Phil Crump
1973/74	Northern Park Raceway	Melbourne	Phil Crump
1974/75	Northern Park Raceway	Melbourne	Phil Crump
1975/76	Northern Park Raceway	Melbourne	Danny Kennedy
1976/77	Northern Park Raceway	Melbourne	Phil Crump
1977/78	Olympic Park Speedway	Mildura	John McNeill
1978/79	U.S.A.C Brooklyn Speedway	Melbourne	Phil Crump
1979/80	Olympic Park Speedway	Mildura	Phil Crump
1980/81	Western International Raceway	Melbourne	Phil Crump
1981/82	Olympic Park Speedway	Mildura	Phil Crump
1982/83	Olympic Park Speedway	Mildura	Rod Hunter
1983/84	Olympic Park Speedway	Mildura	Phil Crump
1984/85	Olympic Park Speedway	Mildura	Phil Crump
1985/86	Undera Park Speedway	Undera	Phil Crump
1986/87	Olympic Park Speedway	Mildura	Andy Barrett
1987/88	Olympic Park Speedway	Mildura	Phil Crump
1988/89	Olympic Park Speedway	Mildura	Leigh Adams
1989/90	Myrtleford Speedway	Myrtleford	Leigh Adams
1990/91	Olympic Park Speedway	Mildura	Leigh Adams
1991/92	Olympic Park Speedway	Mildura	Leigh Adams
1992/93	Myrtleford Speedway	Myrtleford	Mark Lemon
1993/94	Undera Park Speedway	Undera	Leigh Adams
1994/95	Olympic Park Speedway	Mildura	Leigh Adams
1995/96	Bendigo Showgrounds	Bendigo	Mark Lemon
1996/97	Olympic Park Speedway	Mildura	Jason Lyons
1997/98	Olympic Park Speedway	Mildura	Jason Lyons
1998/99	Olympic Park Speedway	Mildura	Jason Lyons
1999/2000	Not Held		
2000/01	Olympic Park Speedway	Mildura	Travis McGowan
2001/02	Olympic Park Speedway	Mildura	Travis McGowan
2002/03	Broadford Speedway	Broadford	Travis McGowan
2003/04	Olympic Park Speedway	Mildura	Travis McGowan
2004/05	Olympic Park Speedway	Mildura	Travis McGowan
2005/06	Broadford Speedway	Broadford	Cameron Woodward
2006/07	Olympic Park Speedway	Mildura	Cory Gathercole
2007/08	Olympic Park Speedway	Mildura	Cameron Woodward
2008/09	Olympic Park Speedway	Mildura	Cameron Woodward
2009/10	Broadford Speedway	Broadford	Tyron Proctor
2010/11	Undera Park Speedway	Undera	Tyron Proctor
2011/12	Olympic Park Speedway	Mildura	Mark Lemon
2012/13	Undera Park Speedway	Undera	Justin Sedgmen
2013/14	Olympic Park Speedway	Mildura	Cameron Woodward
2014/15	Undera Park Speedway	Undera	Sam Masters
2015/16	Olympic Park Speedway	Mildura	Tyron Proctor
2016/17	Broadford Speedway	Broadford	Troy Batchelor
2017/18	Olympic Park Speedway	Mildura	Jaimon Lidsey
2018/19	Diamond Park Speedway	Wodonga	Jack Holder
2019/20	Undera Park Speedway	Undera	Justin Sedgmen
2020/21	Olympic Park Speedway	Mildura	Justin Sedgmen
2021/22	Broadford Speedway	Broadford	Justin Sedgmen
2022/23	Olympic Park Speedway	Mildura	Jaimon Lidsey
2023/24	Undera Park Speedway	Undera	Fraser Bowes
2024/25	Olympic Park Speedway	Mildura	Jaimon Lidsey
2025/26	Olympic Park Speedway	Mildura	Beau Bailey
