= Nudgee, Queensland =

Nudgee
- Suburb
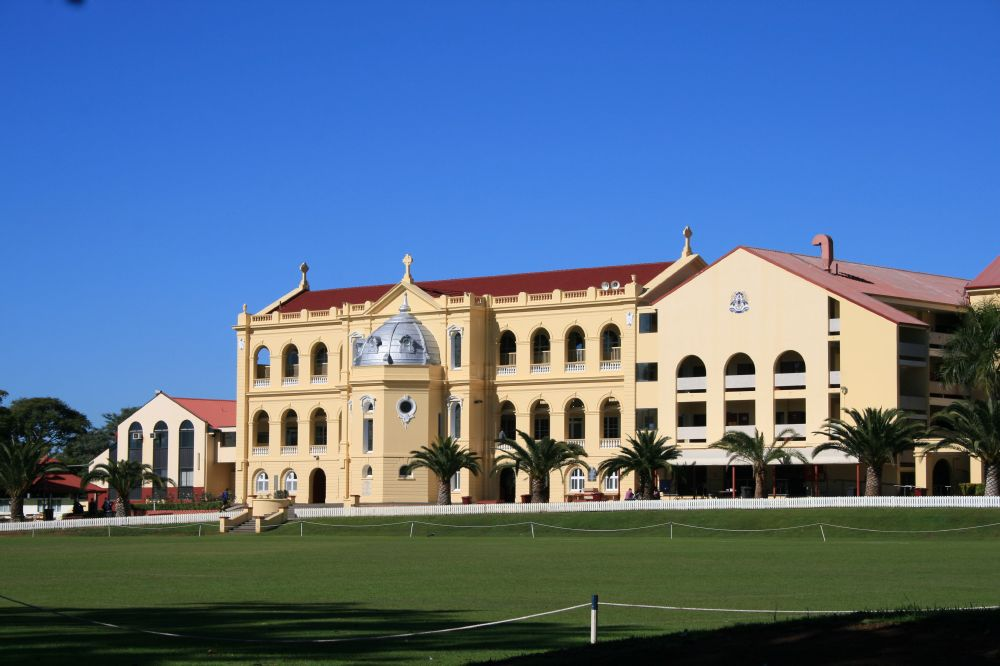
- St Joseph's Nudgee College

- Interactive map of Nudgee
- Coordinates: 27.3705°S 153.09°E
- Country: Australia
- State: Queensland
- City: Brisbane
- LGA: City of Brisbane (Northgate Ward)
- Location: 17.6 km (10.9 mi) NW of Brisbane CBD

Government
  - State electorate: Nudgee
  - Federal division: Lilley

Area
  - Total: 3.9 km^{2} (1.5 sq mi)

Population
  - Total: 4,377 (2021 census)
  - Density: 1,122/km^{2} (2,910/sq mi)
- Time zone: UTC+10:00 (AEST)
- Postcode: 4014
Suburbs around Nudgee
Boondall	Nudgee Beach	Nudgee Beach
Banyo	Nudgee	Nudgee Beach
Banyo	Brisbane Airport	Brisbane Airport

Nudgee is a north-eastern suburb in the City of Brisbane, Queensland, Australia. In the 2021 census, Nudgee had a population of 4,377 people.

== Geography ==
Nudgee is 17.6 kilometres (11 mi) north-west by road of the Brisbane CBD.

The suburb is bounded to the north-east by the Gateway Motorway, including Nudgee Golf Club down to Kedron Brook (27.3767°S 153.1065°E) which forms the south-east boundary, then along Gateway Motorway, including Nudgee Waterhole Reserve (27.3760°S 153.0935°E) and roughly following Farnshaw Road and Red Hill Road to the south, and then roughly following the Shorncliffe railway line to the north-west.

== History ==
The name Nudgee is derived from the Yuggera word in the Yugarabul dialect nardha or nedgee meaning place of ducks, from nar meaning duck' and dha' meaning place.

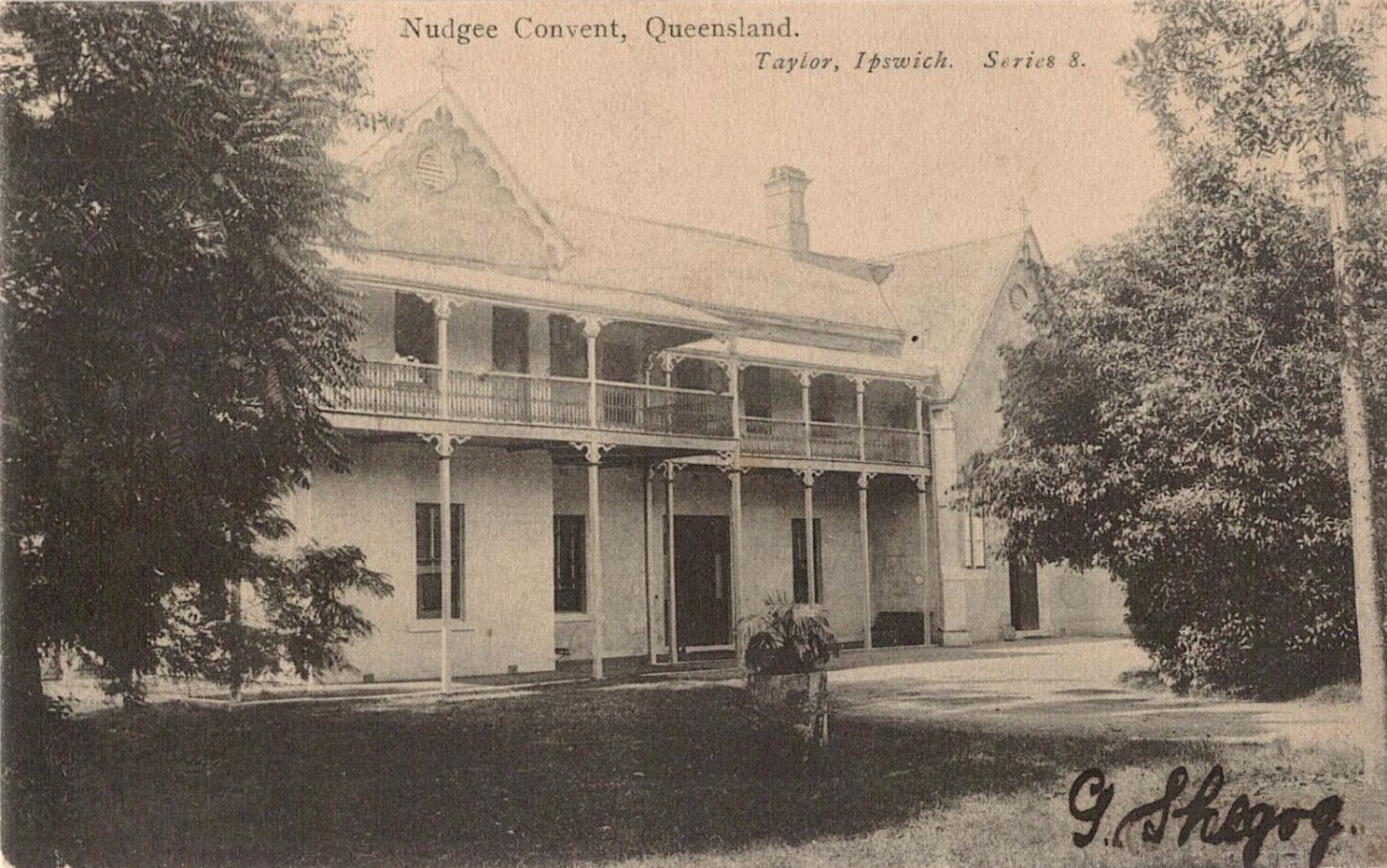
St Vincent's Convent, early 1900s

St Vincent's Orphanage (also known as Nudgee Orphanage) opened on Queens Road (formerly known as Orphanage Road) on 18 December 1866 with children transferred from St Vicent's Orphanage in New Farm. The orphanage was operated by the Sisters of Mercy and had its own school. On Sunday 4 January 1885 Bishop Robert Dunne blessed and officially opened a new church and convent in connection with the orphanage. In 1935 the orphanage was renamed St Vincent's Home for Children. The school operated until the 1950s after which the children attended local schools. The home closed in 1971. Having started with 47 children, over 10,500 children lived in the home throughout its operation. The site now accommodates the head office of Mercy Family Services, which provides services to children, adolescents and families. The buildings of the orphanage complex are listed on the Brisbane Heritage Register (27.3644°S 153.0940°E).

Nudgee Cemetery was established at 493 St Vincents Road in 1867. In 2014 a crematorium was added with columbarium walls for the placement of ashes.

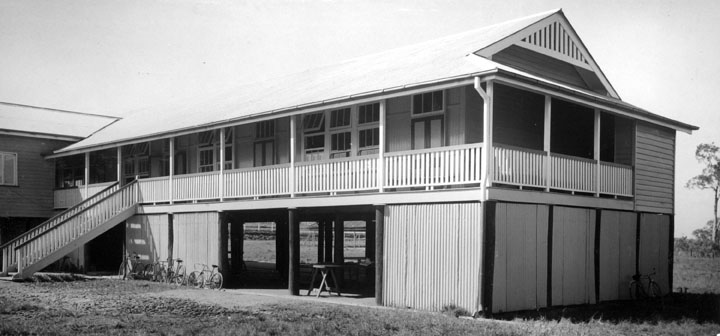
New building at Nudgee State School, August 1950

Nudgee State School opened on 28 June 1875 on the western side of Nudgee Road, just south of the junction with Tufnell Road (present day address approx 936 Nudgee Road, 27.3875°S 153.0863°E) on land donated by Isaac Stuckey (now within the suburb of Banyo). By 1924 frequent flooding of the school building and growth in the local population led to new school buildings being erected at 453 Earnshaw Road. On 31 December 2002 it was closed as part of an amalgamated with Banyo State High School to form Earnshaw State College, which operates from the site of the former high school. "A" Block of the former state school is listed on the Brisbane Heritage Register (27.3774°S 153.0849°E) but is now within the suburb of Banyo, just beyond the boundary with Nudgee. The Nudgee State School website was archived.

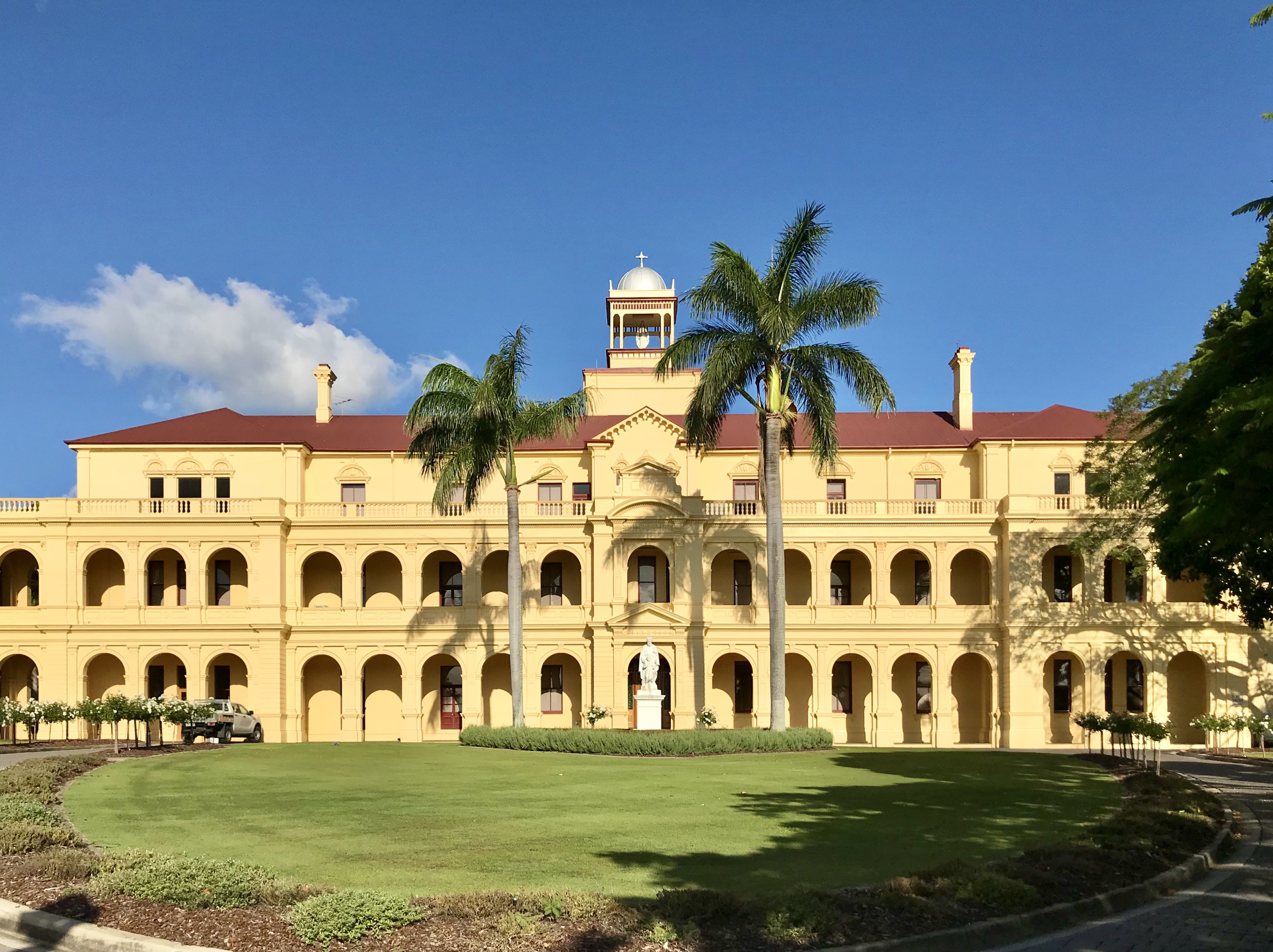
St Joseph's College, 2017

St Joseph's College (also known as Nudgee College) opened in January 1891 as a boarding campus of St Joseph's College, Gregory Terrace by the Congregation of Christian Brothers. Some of the buildings of the school are listed on the Queensland Heritage Register but the school is now within the suburb of Boondall, just west of Nundah Creek, which is the boundary separating Boondall from present day Nudgee. In 1967 the course was increased to 27 holes.

In 1895 a paper was read at Brisbane's Natural History Society meeting at the Queensland Museum about the bora ring identified at Nudgee, described as a circle 50 feet (15 m) in diameter and sitting 18 inches (460 mm) higher than the surrounding land. It was believed there was a second bora ring in the area but it had been lost to farming. Bora rings came in pairs, one for the initiation of young men and the other for communal use. Circa 2000, the surviving bora ring was thought to be the communal bora ring and being oval in shape with dimensions of 21 by 17 metres (69 by 56 ft) with an entrance to the west and that the smaller men's initiation bora ring was about 500 metres (1,600 ft) away near Redway Street.

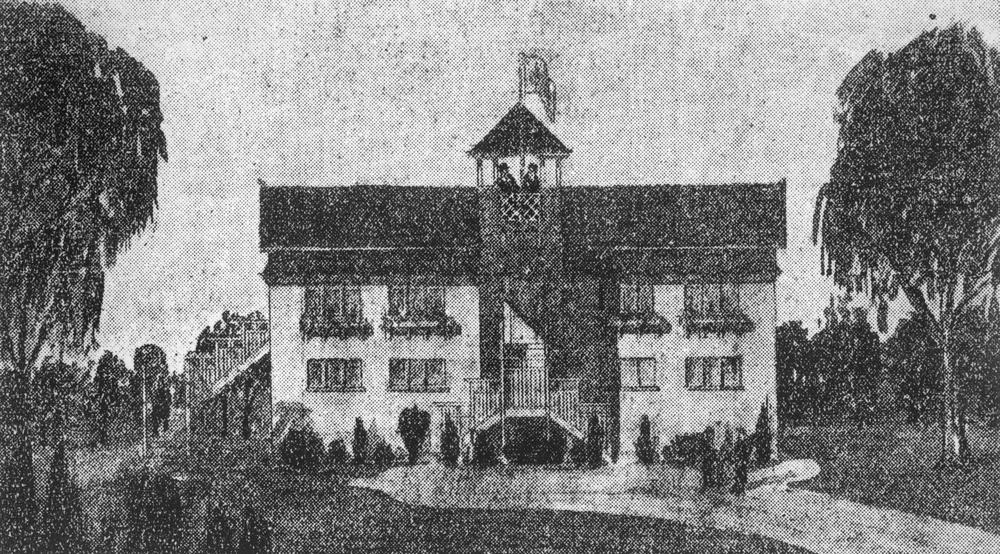
Plan for the first clubhouse for Nudgee Golf Club, 1930

Nudgee was part of the Shire of Toombul until 1925 when the shire was amalgamated into the City of Brisbane.

Nudgee Golf Club was established on 18 January 1930 on land formerly used for grape growing by the Childs family. The first clubhouse opened on 21 January 1931. Initially the course had nine holes, which increased to 16 holes in 1950. On 6 November 1954 the club opened its new clubhouse. In 1985 the Queensland Government wanted to resume part of the golf club's land to construct the Gateway Arterial Road (now the Gateway Motorway). Following two years of negotiations an arrangement was reached in which the government made additional land available to the south to compensate for the resumed land, enabling the course to be extended to 36 holes.

In 1971 the Banyo Devils Rugby League Club opened beside the Bora Ring on Childs Road in Nudgee (27.3722°S 153.0931°E).

Circa 2014, Nudgee was one of the first suburbs in the Brisbane area to be connected to the National Broadband Network.

== Demographics ==
In the 2011 census, Nudgee recorded a population of 2,856 people; 53% female and 47% male. The median age of the Nudgee population was 37 years of age, which was the same as the national median. Children aged under 15 years made up 19.8% of the population and people aged 65 years and over made up 15.4% of the population. 78% of people living in Nudgee were born in Australia, compared to the national average of 69.8%; the next most common countries of birth were New Zealand 3.6%, England 2.5%, India 2.3%, Philippines 1.8%, Ireland 0.9%. 88.1% of people spoke only English at home; the next most popular languages were 1.3% Filipino, 1.1% Punjabi, 0.6% Tagalog, 0.6% German, 0.6% Mandarin.

In the 2016 census, Nudgee had a population of 3,578 people.

In the 2021 census, Nudgee had a population of 4,377 people.

== Heritage listings ==
Nudgee has a number of heritage-listed sites, including:

- 10 Hayden Street: Carew Farmhouse
- 15 Hayden Street: Child's Vineyard Residence (also known as Toombul Vineyards)
- 61 Hayden Street: Nudgee School of Arts & Row of Trees
- 26 Oakmere Street: Glendalough
- 131 Queens Road: former St Vincent's Orphanage
- 18 Railway Street: Fleming Farmhouse
- 40 St Achs Street: Cox's Cottage
- 44 St Achs Street: Emoh
- 491 St Vincents Road: Nudgee Cemetery

== Transport ==
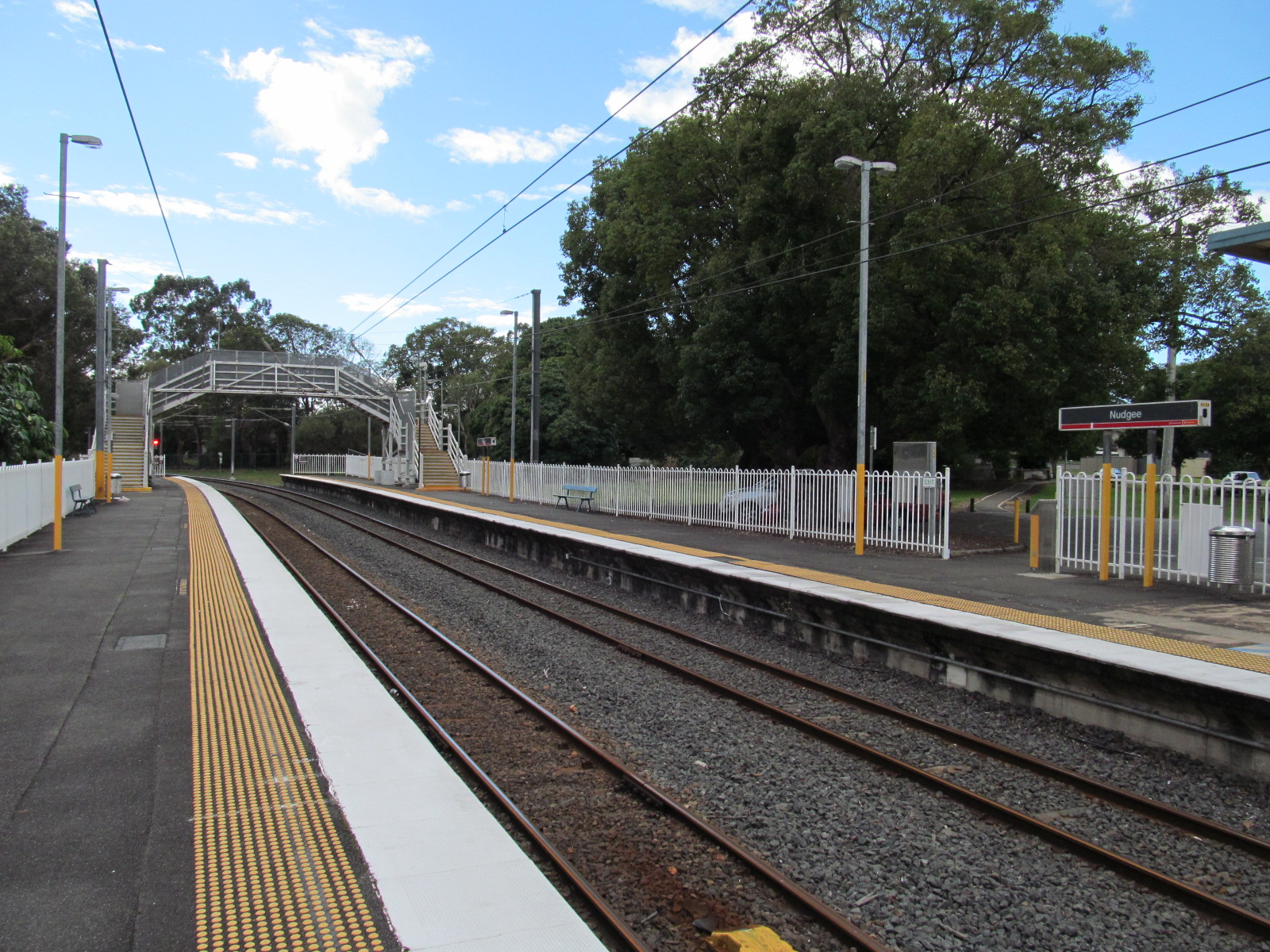
Nudgee railway station, 2013

Nudgee is served by the Nudgee railway station (27.3661°S 153.0835°E) on the Shorncliffe railway line and provides access to regular Queensland Rail City network services to Brisbane and beyond.

In the 2011 census, 18.0% of employed people traveled to work on public transport and 60.3% by car (either as driver or as passenger).

== Facilities ==
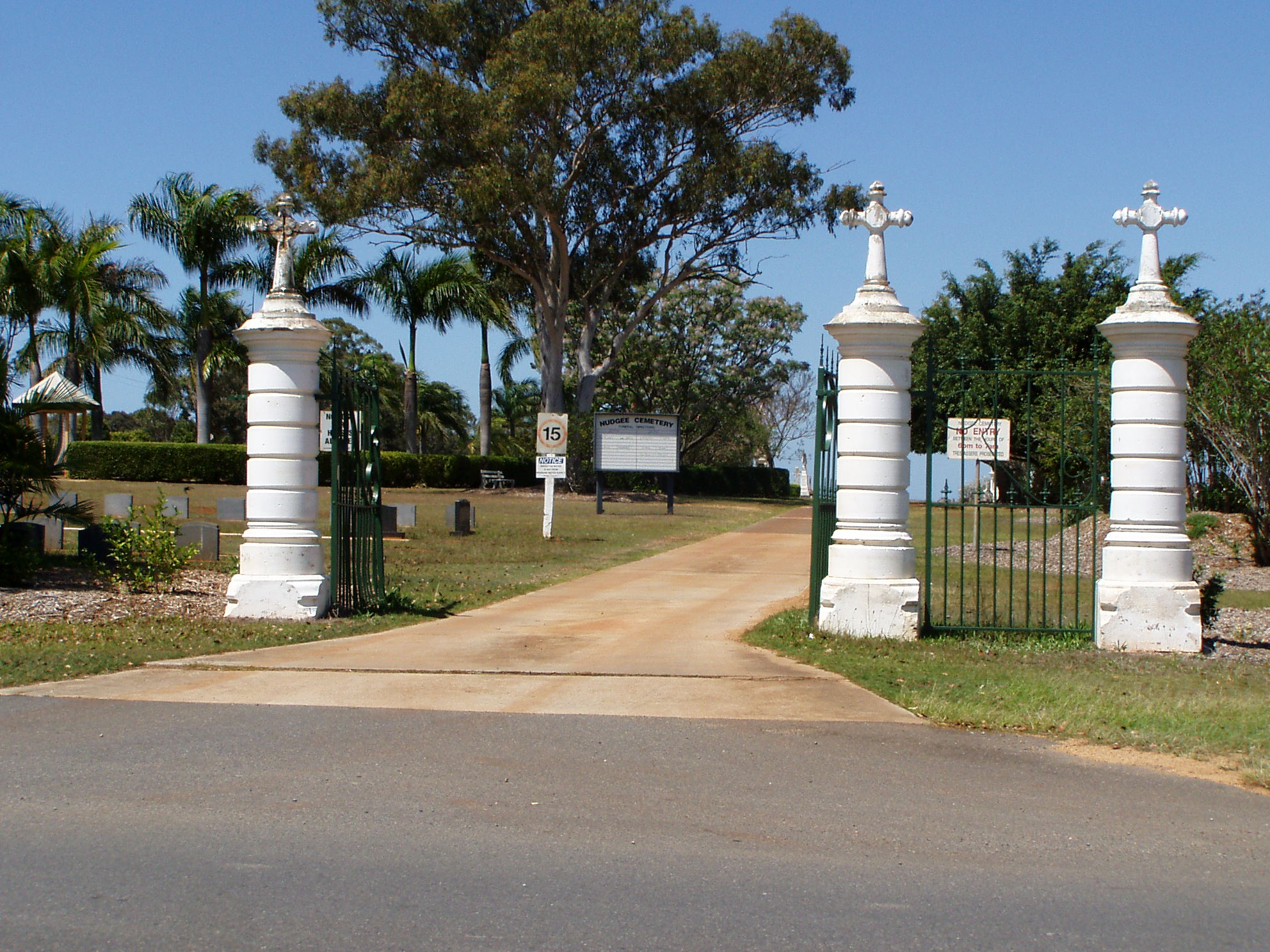
Nudgee Cemetery entrance.jpg

Nudgee cemetery is located on St Vincents Road (27.3697°S 153.0901°E) and is operated by the Roman Catholic Archdiocese of Brisbane. It is the largest private cemetery in Brisbane. Although most people buried there are Catholics, non-Catholics can also be buried there.

Nudgee Golf Club is at 1207 Nudgee Road (27.3730°S 153.0989°E).

Despite its name, the Banyo Devils Rugby League Club is at 51 Childs Road in Nudgee (27.3722°S 153.0931°E).

== Education ==
There are no schools within the suburb. Earnshaw State College is both the nearest primary and secondary school in neighbouring Banyo.

== Attractions ==
Tours of Indigenous culture including the bora ring and the Nudgee waterhole are available (27.3718°S 153.0945°E).
