= Bert Harkins =

Scottish former motorcycle speedway rider

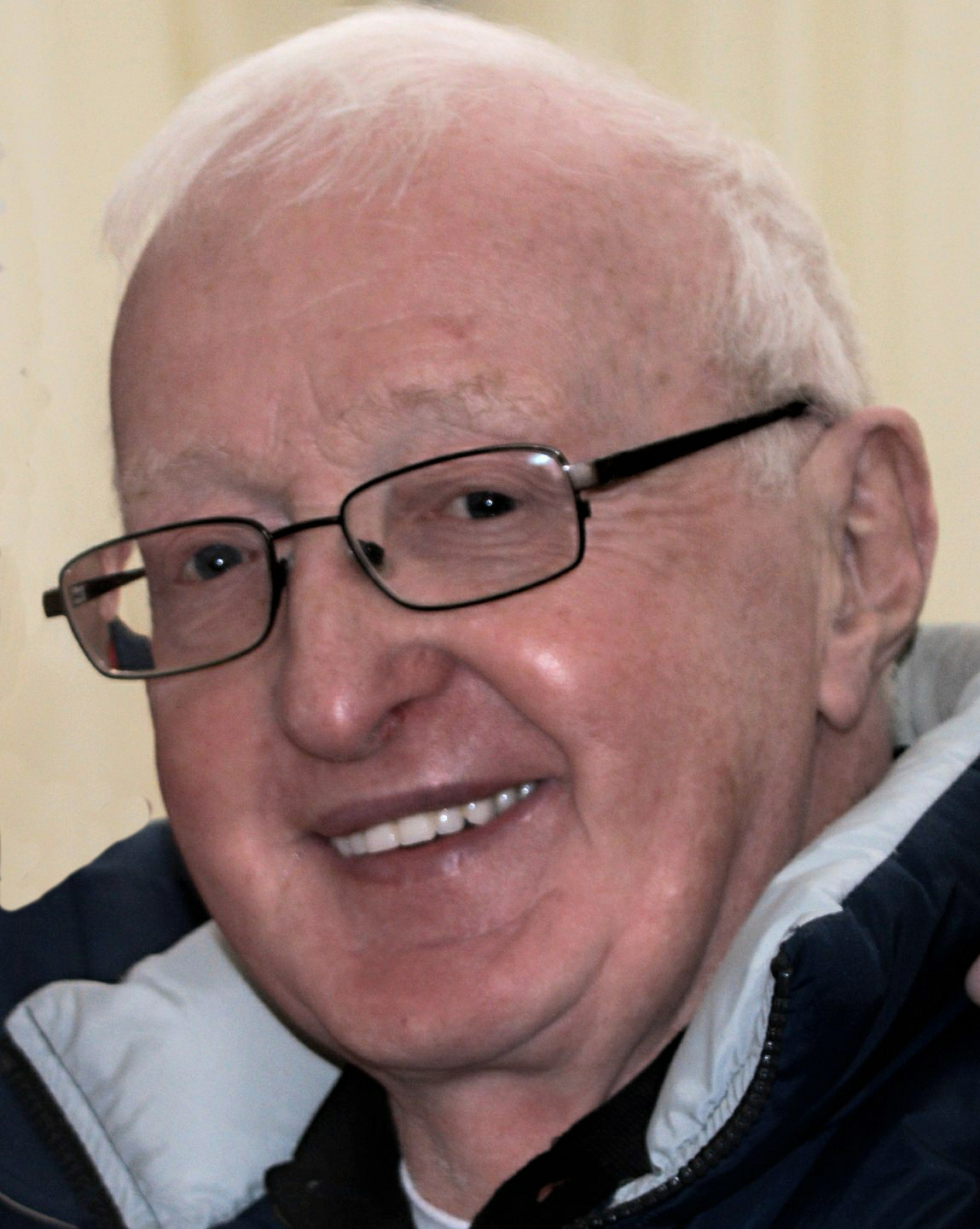
- Born: 15 April 1940 (age 86); Govan, Glasgow, Scotland
- Nickname: Haggis, Bertola
- Nationality: British (Scottish)

Career history
- 1962-1966, 1977, 1978-79: Edinburgh Monarchs
- 1968-1969: Coatbridge Monarchs
- 1970-1971: Wembley Lions
- 1972: Sheffield Tigers
- 1973-1975, 1979: Wimbledon Dons
- 1977: Wolverhampton Wolves
- 1980: Milton Keynes Knights

Individual honours
- 1968: Victorian State title
- 1977: Scottish Open Champion
- 1978: South African Champion

Team honours
- 1974: London Cup Winner

Robert Pearson Harkins (born 15 April 1940) is a former motorcycle speedway rider from Scotland. He earned 2 caps for the Scotland national speedway team, 4 caps for the Great Britain national speedway team and 7 caps for the England national speedway team.

== Biography ==
Harkins' father was a fireman and he was born in the Govan Fire Station in 1940. Harkins was initially a star of cycle speedway who represented Scotland and reached two World Finals. He competed on motorcycles in road racing and first rode a speedway bike in 1961. While working as a lawnmower mechanic for the Glasgow Parks Department, he began his speedway career in the early 1960s, and represented Scotland against England in 1964, going on to represent Scotland several times both at home and around the world until 1973.

Harkins began his career with Edinburgh Monarchs in 1963, riding for the team until 1969, after they had relocated to Coatbridge. In 1968, he travelled to Australia where he won the Victorian Individual Speedway Championship.

In 1970, Harkins signed for Wembley Lions where he spent two seasons, captaining the team after Ove Fundin retired. In 1972, Wembley sent their entire team out on loan due to extra football fixtures stopping the speedway at Wembley and Harkins moved to Sheffield Tigers. He moved on to Wimbledon Dons in 1973, where he rode for three seasons and won the London Cup with them in 1974. He rode in the United States in 1976 with the Bakersfield Bandits. In 1977, he returned to British League action with Edinburgh, staying until the end of the 1979 season. His final season in British speedway was 1980, riding for Milton Keynes Knights.

Harkins was a reserve in the 1971 British final, scoring two points. He finished fifth (with Jim McMillan) in the 1970 World Pairs Final.

A familiar figure in his glasses and tartan hat, Harkins was nicknamed 'Haggis' and also 'Bertola' (after a brand of Sherry sold in Scotland). Harkins was also known to take his pre-meeting parade lap (on his bike) while wearing his tartan hat and kilt.

In 1977, Harkins won the Scottish Open Championship in Blantyre.

After speedway, Harkins concentrated on his motorcycle spares and accessories business, Bert Harkins Racing, and later managed the Scotland national team. In 2008 he became President of the World Speedway Riders Association, taking over the position from Ivan Mauger.

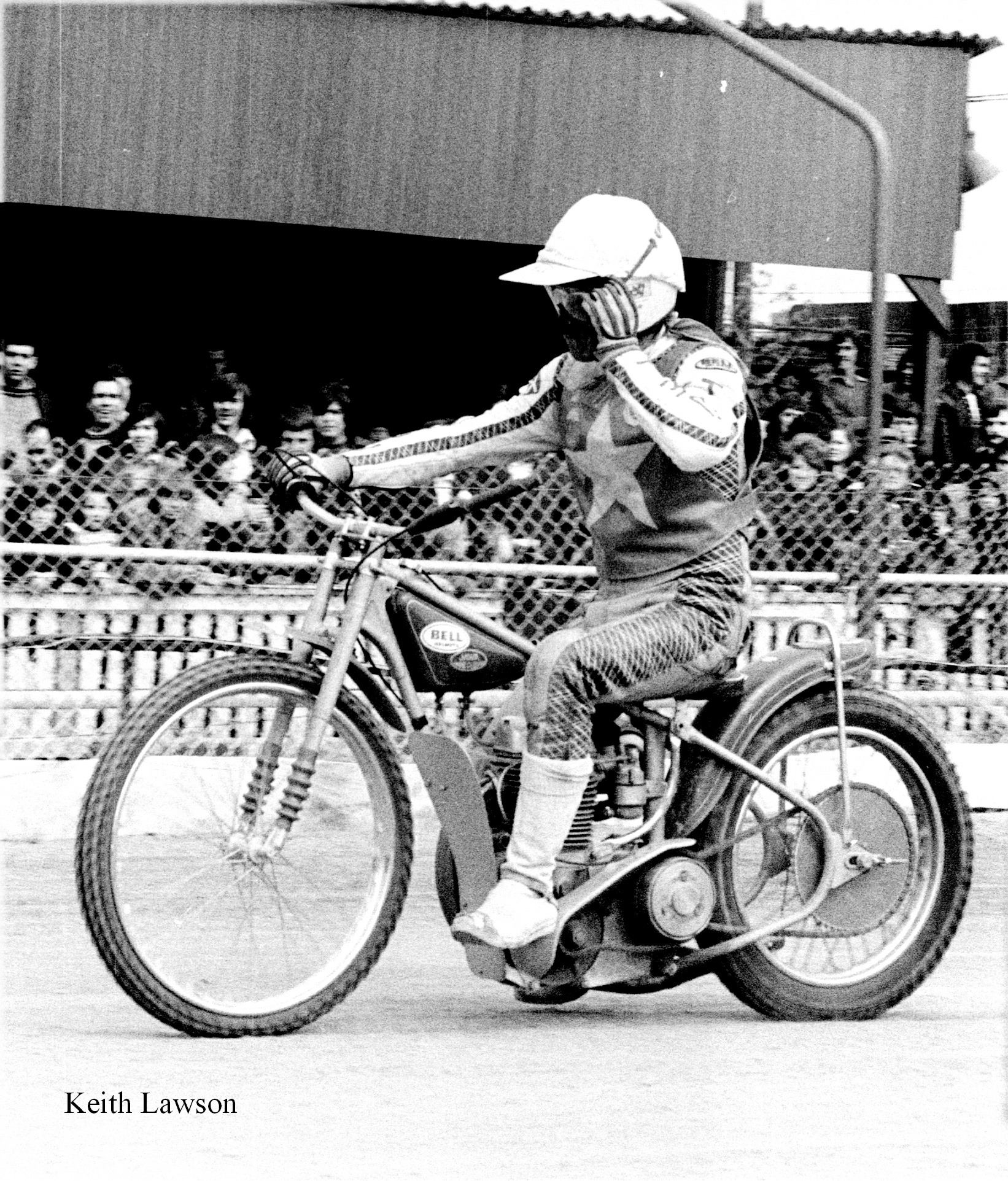
Bert Harkins

== World Final appearances ==
=== World Pairs Championship ===
- 1970 - (Sweden) Malmö, Malmö Stadion (with Jim McMillan) - 4th - 18pts (8)
