= Rockhampton Showgrounds =

Multipurpose recreational venue in Australia

- Interactive map of Rockhampton Showgrounds
- Location: New Exhibition Road, Wandal, Queensland
- Coordinates: 23°22′7″S 150°29′56″E
- Owner: Rockhampton Regional Council

Tenant
- Rockhampton Agricultural Society

The Rockhampton Showgrounds is a multipurpose recreational venue in Rockhampton, Queensland, Australia. It is situated in the suburb of Wandal.

== History ==
It was opened in its current location in 1886 by the Fitzroy Pastoral, Agricultural and Horticultural Society, replacing an earlier showground in William Street. The plan for the new showground venue in Wandal, at a cost of £2000, was approved in December 1885.

== Facilities ==
Since its opening in 1886, the venue has undergone numerous upgrades, improvements and additions.

The Rockhampton Showgrounds currently encompasses numerous pavilions, grandstands and buildings which are located around the perimeter of the main show ring. They include the Walter Pierce Pavilion, the James Lawrence Pavilion, the Robert Schwarten Pavilion, the Kele Pavilion, the McCamley Pavilion and the Robert Archer Grandstand.

== Events ==
Annual, biennial and triennial events which are held at the Rockhampton Showgrounds include:

- Rockhampton Agricultural Show
- Rockynats
- Beef Australia
- Rocky Swap
- Lifeline Bookfest
- Taste of the World Festival
- Rockhampton Expo
- CQ Sports and Health Expo
- Exercise Talisman Sabre Open Day
- Handmade Expo
- Former Origin Greats Indigenous Employment and Careers Expo

The showgrounds has also been used for many years as a local speedway with motorcycle racing having been held since 1925.

Concerts are regularly held at the Rockhampton Showgrounds. Johnny Cash, John Denver, Australian Crawl, Shannon Noll, Split Enz, Cold Chisel, Powderfinger, You Am I, Amy Shark, Timberwolf, Busby Marou, Troy Cassar-Daley and Fanny Lumsden are some of the notable artists to have performed at the Rockhampton Showgrounds.

== Speedway ==
Motorcycle speedway has been held at the venue since 1925 and throughout its history has held many important events, including qualifying rounds of the Speedway World Championship, starting in 1982, the finals of the Australian Championship in 1962 and 1963 and the Queensland Solo Championship on multiple occasions since 1960.

The Showgrounds hosted the Australian Sprintcar Championship in 1984. Unfortunately for the locals, it was an all-New South Wales podium with Garry Rush winning his 6th Australian title (and 4th in a row, a record yet to be beaten as of 2024), from fellow Sydneysiders George Tatnell and John Walsh. It was the only time that Rockhampton has hosted Australia's premier car speedway category's National championship with all times held in Queensland since being held at the Archerfield Speedway in Brisbane.

The noise created by concert and speedway events has generated complaints from residents living near the venue. In an attempt to appease local residents, a 10:30 pm curfew was imposed for event organisers. The decision to lift the curfew for selected events, however, has also been met with criticism. The ongoing issue has prompted discussions about moving the venue out of the city and away from the residential area in Wandal.

== Notable events ==
In 1912, American aviator Arthur Burr Stone used the Rockhampton Showgrounds to demonstrate flight with his Blériot monoplane.

In 1927, the finals scenes of what is believed to be Australia's last silent film, The Kid Stakes were filmed at the Rockhampton Showgrounds.

In 1996, a prize bull escaped from its handlers at the Rockhampton Agricultural Show and charged a lunchtime crowd at the showgrounds resulting in some injuries to attendees.

In 2018, two prison inmates from the Capricornia Correctional Centre escaped from the Rockhampton Showgrounds where they were completing a community work order. They were both later captured separately in Mackay.

In mid-2018, a dispute arose between the Rockhampton Agricultural Society and the Showmen's Guild of Australasia over space allocation at the venue for the wood-chopping contest at the Rockhampton Show. The disagreement prompted the showmen to boycott the Rockhampton Show leaving the event at the showgrounds without any of the regular sideshow alley amusements. The guild instead established their own rival event at Callaghan Park on the other side of the Fitzroy River, held simultaneously in direct competition with the Rockhampton Show.

In late-2018, two Rockhampton Regional Council councillors voiced their objections to a decision to relocate the popular steampunk convention CapriCon from the library precinct in the city centre to the Rockhampton Showgrounds. Proponents for the move believe the event had grown in such popularity since its inception that a move to the Rockhampton Showgrounds was essential for the event as it offered larger venue space, improved security and increased accessibility.
