= Earnshaw State College =

Coordinates: 27°22′43″S 153°04′53″E

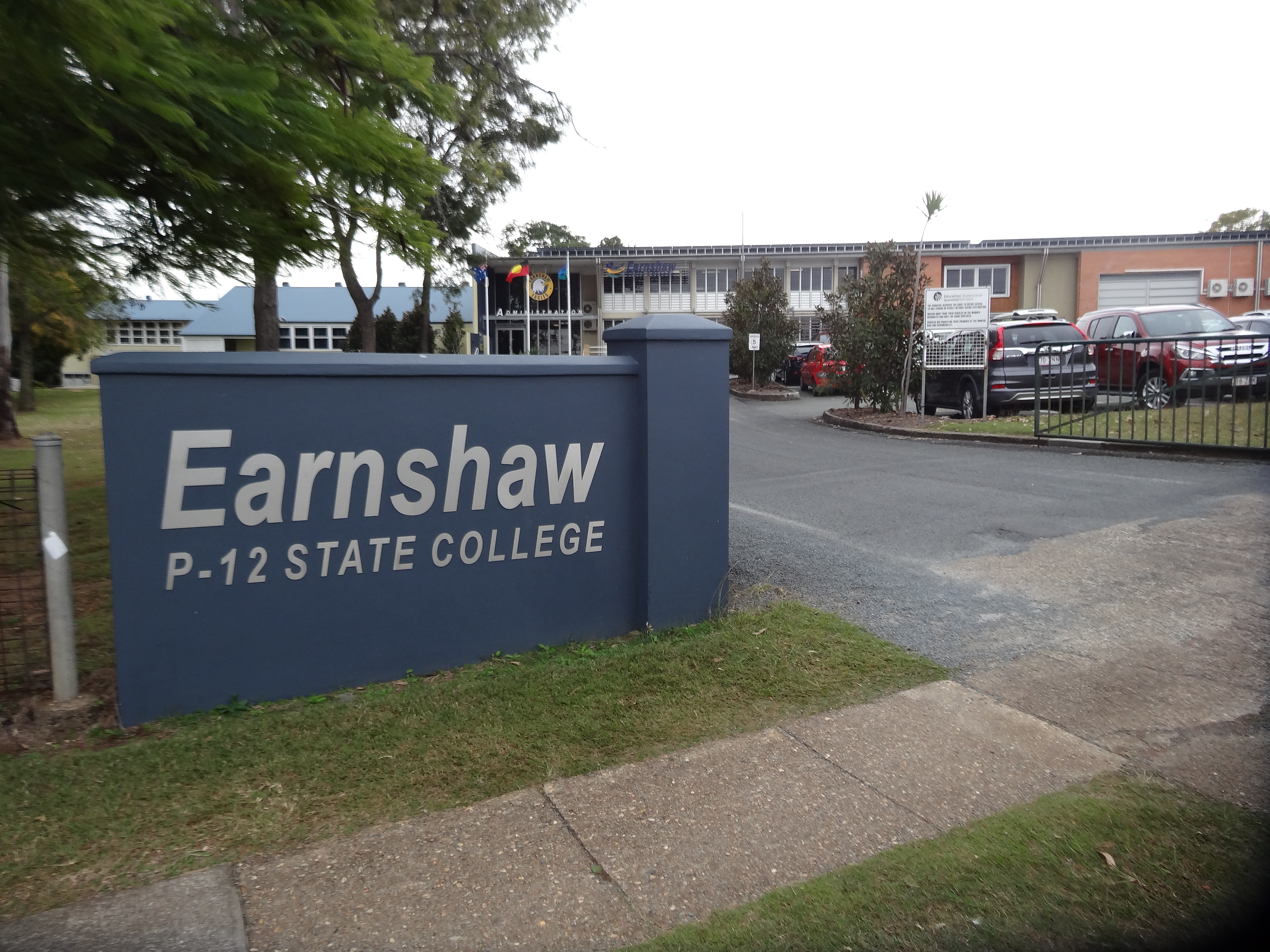
- Main Entrance, 2023

Location
- Earnshaw Road, Banyo; Brisbane, Queensland; Australia

Information
- Type: State college
- Motto: Prepare Today for Tomorrow
- Established: 2003
- School district: Banyo Nudgee
- Principal: Karen McKinnon
- Grades: P–12
- Enrolment: 856 (2023)
- Campus: Campus has three sub-schools: Junior (P–6), Middle (7–9), Senior (10–12)
- Colours: Navy, yellow, green & white
- Mascot: The Earnshaw Eagle
- Newspaper: Earnshaw Edge
- Website: https://earnshawsc.eq.edu.au/

Earnshaw State College is a public, co-educational, P-12, school located in the Brisbane suburb of Banyo, in Queensland, Australia. It is administered by the Department of Education, with an enrolment of 856 students and a teaching staff of 68, as of 2023. The school serves students from Prep to Year 12, on three campuses.

== History ==
Established in 2003, after a full amalgamation of both Nudgee State School (28 June 1875 – 31 December 2002) and Banyo State High School (2 February 1954 – 31 December 2002).

=== Nudgee State School ===
The school received many upgrades in 1922, including to the fencing and the construction of a new building, which had a capacity of 120 students.

=== Banyo State High School ===
In the 1961 school year, the school had an enrollment of 980 students, 580 boys and 400 girls. The school offered a number of sporting programs to both boys and girls. As of 1961, the boys were offered Rugby League, Australian Rules Football, Hockey, Tennis, and Cricket. Girls were provided Basketball, Hockey, Tennis, and (as of 1962) Softball.

Teams of Earnshaw students from Grades 10, 11 and 12 won the 2010, 2011, and 2012 Global Enterprise Challenge.

In 2013, the school was evacuated due to a strong gas leak in the area, three people from the college were taken to hospital. Classes resumed later that day.

== Sporting houses ==
The College has three sporting houses, Bradman, O'Neil, and Rafter. Bradman is named after Donald Bradman and the representative colour for the house is blue. O'Neill is named after Susie O'Neill and the representative colour for the house is green. Finally, Rafter is named after Patrick Rafter and the representative colour for the house is red.

== Notable alumni ==
=== Banyo State High School (1954–2002) ===
Leanne Linard, Member for the Queensland seat of Nudgee and was the Minister for Children and Youth Justice and Minister for Multicultural Affairs in the Palaszczuk Government.

Seath Holswich, Member for Queensland seat of Pine Rivers (2012–15) and Assistant Minister for Natural Resources and Mines (2014–15) in the Newman Government. He was Banyo State High School Captain in 1994.

Yvonne Chapman, Queensland Member of Parliament from 1983 until 1989.
