= Pioneer Park Speedway =

Speedway stadium in Brandon, Queensland

- Location: Pioneer Park Speedway, 30825 Bruce Highway, Brandon, Queensland 4808, Australia
- Coordinates: 19°34′16″S 147°20′22″E
- Opened: 13 April 1974
- Length: 350 m (0.22 mi)

Pioneer Park Speedway is a motorcycle speedway venue near Ayr, Queensland in Australia. It is located approximately 2.5 kilometres south west of Brandon, Queensland, on the Bruce Highway.

== History ==
The facility opened on 13 April 1974, after initially being a project conceived by Brian Hodder in 1970.

The track has been a significant venue for important motorcycle speedway events, including qualifying rounds of the Speedway World Championship (the first in 1982).

It has also held the final of the Australian Solo Championship in 1985 and 1986 and the Queensland Solo Championship on eleven occasions from 1976 to 2018.

The track was purchased on two occasions by Rod and Teri Heathcote, in 2000 and 2016, the second when the track had fallen into a state of disrepair. It re-opened in 2016.
