= Banyo, Queensland =

Banyo
- Suburb
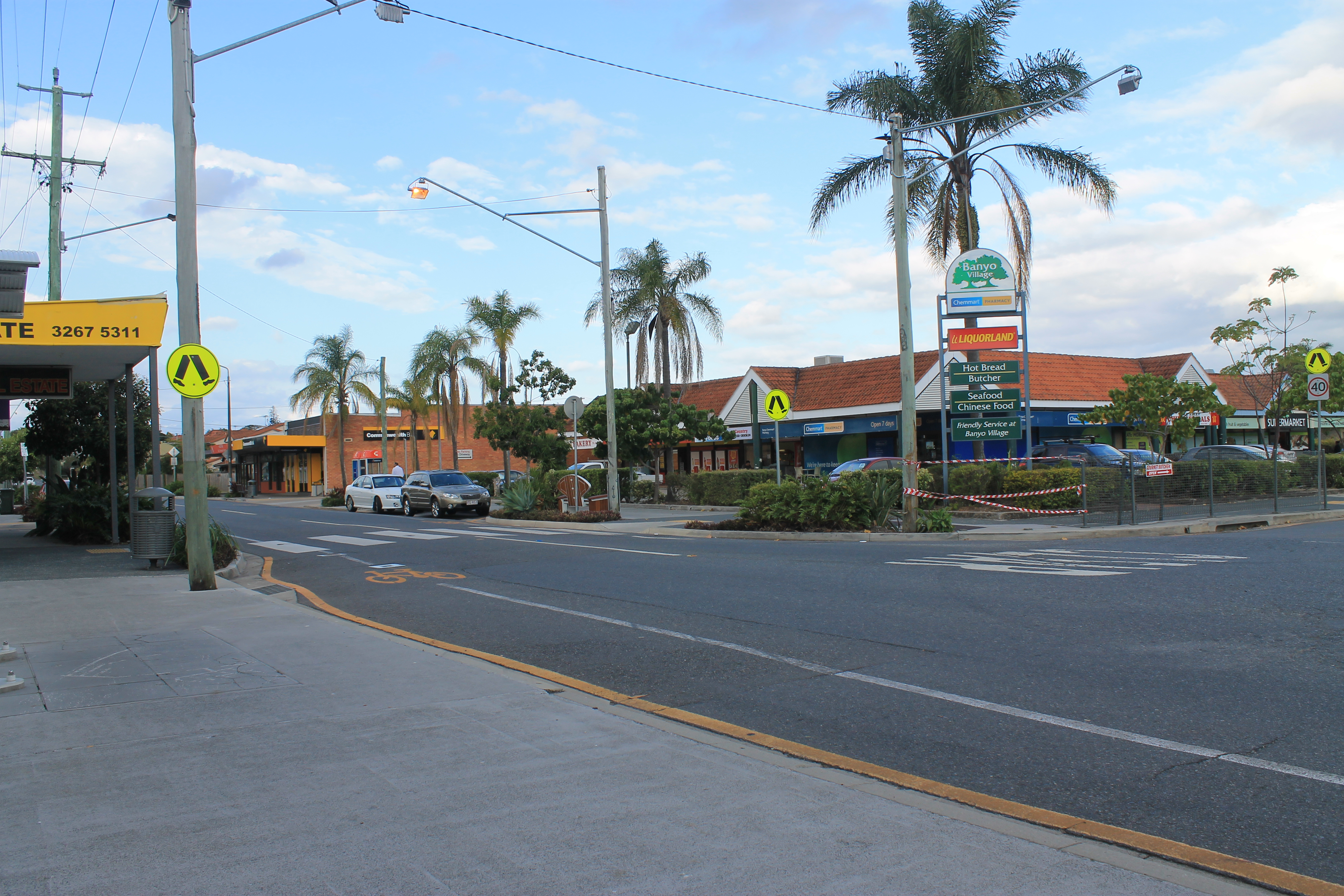
- Shopping village in Banyo

- Interactive map of Banyo
- Coordinates: 27.3788°S 153.0816°E
- Country: Australia
- State: Queensland
- City: Brisbane
- LGA: City of Brisbane (Northgate Ward)
- Location: 14.0 km (8.7 mi) NE of Brisbane CBD

Government
  - State electorate: Nudgee
  - Federal division: Lilley

Area
  - Total: 5.1 km^{2} (2.0 sq mi)

Population
  - Total: 6,105 (2021 census)
  - Density: 1,197/km^{2} (3,100/sq mi)
- Time zone: UTC+10:00 (AEST)
- Postcode: 4014
Suburbs around Banyo
Boondall	Boondall	Nudgee
Virginia	Banyo	Nudgee
Northgate	Brisbane Airport	Brisbane Airport

Banyo is a northern suburb in the City of Brisbane, Queensland, Australia. In the 2021 census, Banyo had a population of 6,105 people.

It is a community split between residential and industrial land usage, the latter being attracted by the accessibility of local transport, including the Gateway Motorway.

== Geography ==
Banyo and the neighbouring suburb Nudgee, with which it is intertwined in many respects, are both rich in local history. This history includes the recent preservation of an Aboriginal Bora Ring. The areas of Nudgee and Nudgee Beach border on the Boondall Wetlands, which is protected by the Brisbane City Council.

Banyo has vastly increased the number of its business and industrial parks in recent years due to its close proximity to Brisbane Airport and the nearby Port of Brisbane. Nudgee Road is progressively becoming a commercial hub due to its connection to the Gateway Motorway, with a large service centre and petrol station and with new industrial grounds under construction overlooking the motorway itself.

The Australian Catholic University chose to establish its Brisbane campus on the site of the former Pius XII Seminary. The opening of a Woolworths supermarket also boosted the Banyo housing market.

A residential estate, 'Couture', has been developed on the site of an old Army depot lying adjacent to the Golden Circle cannery based in next-door Northgate. Another new residential estate, 'Summerlin' has also recently been constructed on a former Hills Hoist manufacturing plant.

The Shorncliffe railway line enters the suburb from the west (Virginia) and exits to the north (Boondall). The suburb is served by Banyo railway station at the intersection of Royal Parade and St Vincents Road (27.3746°S 153.0774°E).

Banyo's commercial centre (the area surrounding Banyo railway station) has recently been enhanced following a Brisbane City Council Suburban Community Improvement Project (SCIP).

== History ==
Originally inhabited by the native Turrbal tribe, the area became known as Clapham Junction once the suburb was settled by Europeans in 1849. It was not until 1897 when it officially adopted the name Banyo, an Aboriginal word which means a hill or ridge. The name was chosen by the Secretary for Railways James Dickson, and was also given to the Banyo railway station. The hill that it was named after no longer exists, having been quarried for the construction of Eagle Farm Airport during World War II.

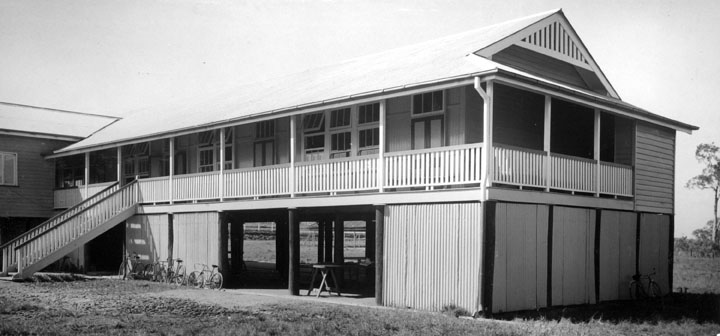
New building at Nudgee State School, August 1950

Nudgee State School opened on 28 June 1875 on Nudgee Road on the western side of Nudgee Road, just south of the junction with Tufnell Road on land donated by Isaac Stuckey (present day address approx 936 Nudgee Road, 27.3875°S 153.0863°E). By 1924 frequent flooding of the school building and growth in the local population led to new school buildings being erected at 453 Earnshaw Road (27.3774°S 153.0849°E). On 31 December 2002 it was closed as part of an amalgamated with Banyo State High School to form Earnshaw State College, which opened in January 2003 from the site of the former high school. "A" Block of the former state school is listed on the Brisbane Heritage Register. The Nudgee State School website was archived.

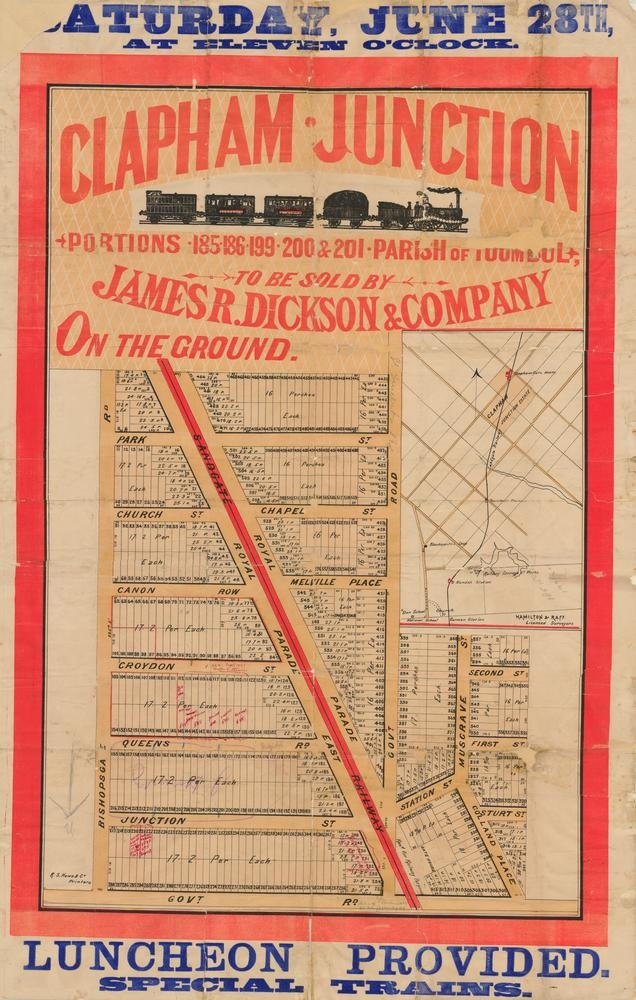
Real estate map for sale of residential blocks to the south of Banyo railway station

In June 1884, approximately 600 allotments of "Clapham Junction Estate" were advertised to be auctioned by James R. Dickson & Company, auctioneers. The map advertising the auction states the Estate has magnificent view of the bay, and is located on the Sandgate Line between Toombul and Nudgee Stations.

In January 1888, the "Croydon Estate" made up of approximately 362 allotments was advertised to be auctioned by James R. Dickson & Company, auctioneers. The map advertising the auction states the Estate adjoins "Clapham Junction Estate" and is close to Sandgate Railway Station.

In 1918, local Anglicans purchased a block of land for £240. St Oswald's Anglican Church was dedicated on 17 February 1929 by Archbishop Gerald Sharp. The church hall was built in 1946.

On Saturday 14 March 1925, the Banyo Memorial School of Arts was officially opened by the Queensland Governor, Matthew Nathan. It was at the junction of St Vincents Road and Royal Parade. Inside there was a World War I Honour Board and a photo of the deceased Mrs Emma Purchase who had instigated the movement to construct the School of Arts. Another Honour Board was installed after World War II. By the 1990s the hall was in a dilapidated condition and in May 1988 a public meeting voted to demolish the hall, which took place in October 1988 and the land was sold in 2001. Funds from the sale were used to build a bandstand in Banyo Memorial Park in 2013.

Baptist services commenced in the Banyo School of Arts in March 1925. In October 1928, Arthur Hartley donated a 50-perch (1,300 m^{2}) piece of land to construct a Baptist church. The Banyo Baptist Church was officially opened on Saturday 6 December 1930. It was 30 by 21 feet (9.1 by 6.4 m) and capable of seating about 120 people. The church is highset timber with an iron roof and has a room underneath which is 21 by 12 feet (6.4 by 3.7 m). The current Baptist Church was built on the same site in 1967.

In January 1927, 102 allotments of the "Northgate Extension Estate" were advertised to be auctioned by Edward S. Crawford & Co., property salesmen, in conjunction with John Coleman, auctioneer. The map advertising the auction states the Estate has salubrious sea breezes with the Sandgate to Brisbane bus service that passes handy to the estate and 68 passenger trains daily.

In September 1927, a plan of the "Purdy Estate" was drawn up by Ernest C. Henzell and W. Carlyle Henzell, Land Agents. The map advertising the land sale shows the land allotments near Banyo Station.

In September 1928, the "Robinson's Paddock Estate" made up of 81 allotments was advertised to be auctioned by Isles, Love, & Co. Limited, auctioneers. The map advertising the auction states the Estate is handy to the station, schools, churches and stores. water and electric light pass the estate, and it is situated within a few miles of the popular sea beaches of Sandgate, Nudgee and Cribb Island.

St Pius' Catholic Primary School opened on 16 March 1947. It was operated by the Sisters of St Joseph of the Sacred Heart.

Banyo State High School opened on 2 February 1954 and closed on 31 December 2002. It was reopened in January 2003 as Earnshaw State College, after merging with Nudgee State School, creating a "P-12" college.

== Demographics ==
In the 2011 census, Banyo had a population of 5,607 people.

In the 2016 census, Banyo had a population of 5,868 people, 49.7% female and 50.3% male. The median age of the Banyo population was 37 years of age. 72.2% of people living in Banyo were born in Australia, compared to the national average of 66.7%; the next most common countries of birth were New Zealand 5.3%, India 3.1%, England 2.4%, Philippines 2.0%, China 0.9%. 81.8% of people spoke only English at home; the next most popular languages were 1.6% Punjabi, 1.1% Mandarin, 1.0% Hindi, 0.9% Vietnamese.

In the 2021 census, Banyo had a population of 6,105 people.

== Heritage listings ==
There are numerous heritage listings in Banyo:

- 62 Blinzinger Road: Hartley Farmhouse
- 368 Earnshaw Road (27.3805°S 153.0789°E): United States Army General Depot Sentry Box
- 425 Earnshaw Road: former Nudgee Methodist Church (also known as Toombul District Uniting Church)
- 453 Earnshaw Road: Nudgee State School A Block
- 9 Froude Street: St Oswald's Church and Hall
- 58 Meredith Street: White Farmhouse
- 1058 Nudgee Road: Former Pius XII Seminary: St Paul's Domain (also known as Australian Catholic University)
- Opposite 15 Royal Parade (27.3749°S 153.0772°E): Banyo railway station
- 201 St Vincents Road: Dent Residence
- 273 St Vincent incents Road: Banyo War Memorial
- 302 St Vincents Road: Robinson Farmhouse
- 334 St Vincents Road: Nudgee Telephone Exchange
- 348 St Vincents Road: St Pius Presbytery (former) (Church of the Holy Trinity Presbytery)
- 274 Tufnell Road: Blinzinger Farmhouse

== Education ==
St Pius' Primary School is a Catholic primary (Prep–6) school for boys and girls at Apperley Street (27.3719°S 153.0809°E). In 2018, the school had an enrolment of 384 students with 30 teachers (24 full-time equivalent) and 15 non-teaching staff (10 full-time equivalent).

Earnshaw State College is a government primary and secondary (Prep–12) school for boys and girls at 438 Earnshaw Road (corner of Tufnell Road, 27.3793°S 153.0814°E). In 2018, the school had an enrolment of 728 students with 68 teachers (64 full-time equivalent) and 39 non-teaching staff (27 full-time equivalent). It includes a special education program.

The McAuley (Brisbane) campus of the Australian Catholic University is at 1100 Nudgee Road (27.3776°S 153.0897°E). It includes St Paul's Theological College (27.3781°S 153.0876°E).

== Facilities ==
Banyo Police station is at 21 Royal Parade (27.3751°S 153.0767°E).

== Amenities ==
The Brisbane City Council operates a public library at 284 St Vincents Road (27.3743°S 153.078°E). The Banyo Library opened in 1981 with a major refurbishment in 2009. A new retail centre with Woolworths and 12 other specialties was opened in May 2016. The 5136-square-metre centre sits on a 17,000 sq m site.

There are a number of parks in the suburb.

Parks
Park name	Location	Facilities
Banyo Memorial Park	300 St Vincents Road	Banyo Library and Community Hall, barbecue (electric), outdoor fitness/exercise station, playground, skate facility, water (bubbler/tap), Wi-Fi Full-size concreted volleyball court with posts. Users of the court are required to supply their own net.
Bilambil Street Park	47B Bilambil Street	
Billara Place Park	43 Billara Place	
Churchill Circuit Park	27 Churchill Circuit	Picnic area/shelter with electric barbecue (Batchelor Place) and playground (Batchelor Place)
Corbyn Street Park	449 Tufnell Road	
Earnshaw Road Park	25 Patonga Street	
Hilltop Place Park	37 Hilltop Place	Picnic area/shelter
Patonga Street Park	25 Patonga Street	Basketball half court, picnic area/shelter with electric barbecue, playground and water (bubbler/tap)
Patrea Street Park	1004 Nudgee Road	Outdoor fitness/exercise equipment, playground
Tufnell Road Park	48 Tufnell Road	

=== Shopping centres ===
There are two shopping centres in Banyo:

- Banyo Retail Centre, anchored by Woolworths, at 221 Tufnell Road (27.3763°S 153.078°E)
- Banyo Shopping Centre, at 276 St Vincents Road (27.3746°S 153.0779°E)

Banyo Post Office is in the Banyo Shopping Centre (27.3749°S 153.0782°E).

=== Churches ===
St Oswald's Anglican Church is at 9 Froude Street (27.3750°S 153.0761°E). The hall is available for community events and operates the local Meals on Wheels service.

Holy Trinity Catholic Church is at 352 St Vincents Road (27.3719°S 153.0816°E).

Kenani Community Church is at 425 Earnshaw Road (27.3785°S 153.0833°E). It is part of the Uniting Church in Australia and supports multi-cultural communities to either worship in their own language or share in worship with others. Kenani is the Rotuman language word for Canaan.

Banyo Presbyterian Church is at 341 St Vincents Road (27.3737°S 153.0802°E). It is part of the Presbyterian Church of Queensland.

Banyo Baptist Church is at 22 Hartley Street (corner of Musgrave Road, 27.3777°S 153.0716°E).

== Sport ==
Despite its name, the Virginia Golf Club is located at Elliott Road, Banyo (27.3730°S 153.0674°E). Banyo bowling club is situated at 16 Froude Street, Banyo.

Supercars team Triple Eight Race Engineering are based in Banyo.

North Brisbane Junior Motorcycle Club (NBJMC) run motorcycle events on the west side of the Kedron Brook, located at (27°23′30″S 153°05′25″E). The motorcycle speedway track at the venue is run by former rider Darcy Ward and has hosted important events, including the final of the 2024 Australian Speedway Championship.

== Events ==
The annual Diwali Festival is celebrated at Banyo Memorial Park. The festival provides an opportunity for the Indian community to share its culture with the rest of Australia.

== Transport ==
Banyo railway station provides access to regular Queensland Rail Citytrain network services to Brisbane and Shorncliffe.

Banyo railway station was closed on Monday 22 January 2024 for an accessibility upgrade, which will include a new footbridge with lift access and full-length, high-level platforms. The station was expected to reopen in late 2024, but has been delayed until early 2025. A replacement Translink rail bus service takes passengers between Banyo and Northgate stations.

The 306 bus service operated by Brisbane City Council goes to the Cultural Centre via Fortitude Valley.

The Australian Catholic University operates two free bus routes for students that run from Toombul to the university via Northgate station and between the university and Westfield Chermside.
