= Lean Cuisine =

Brand of frozen entrées

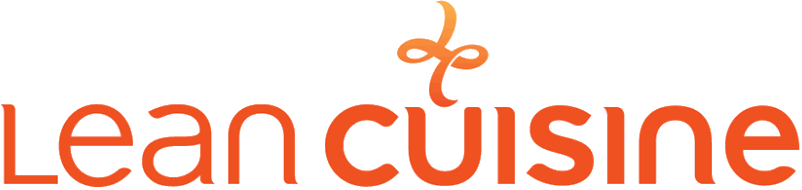

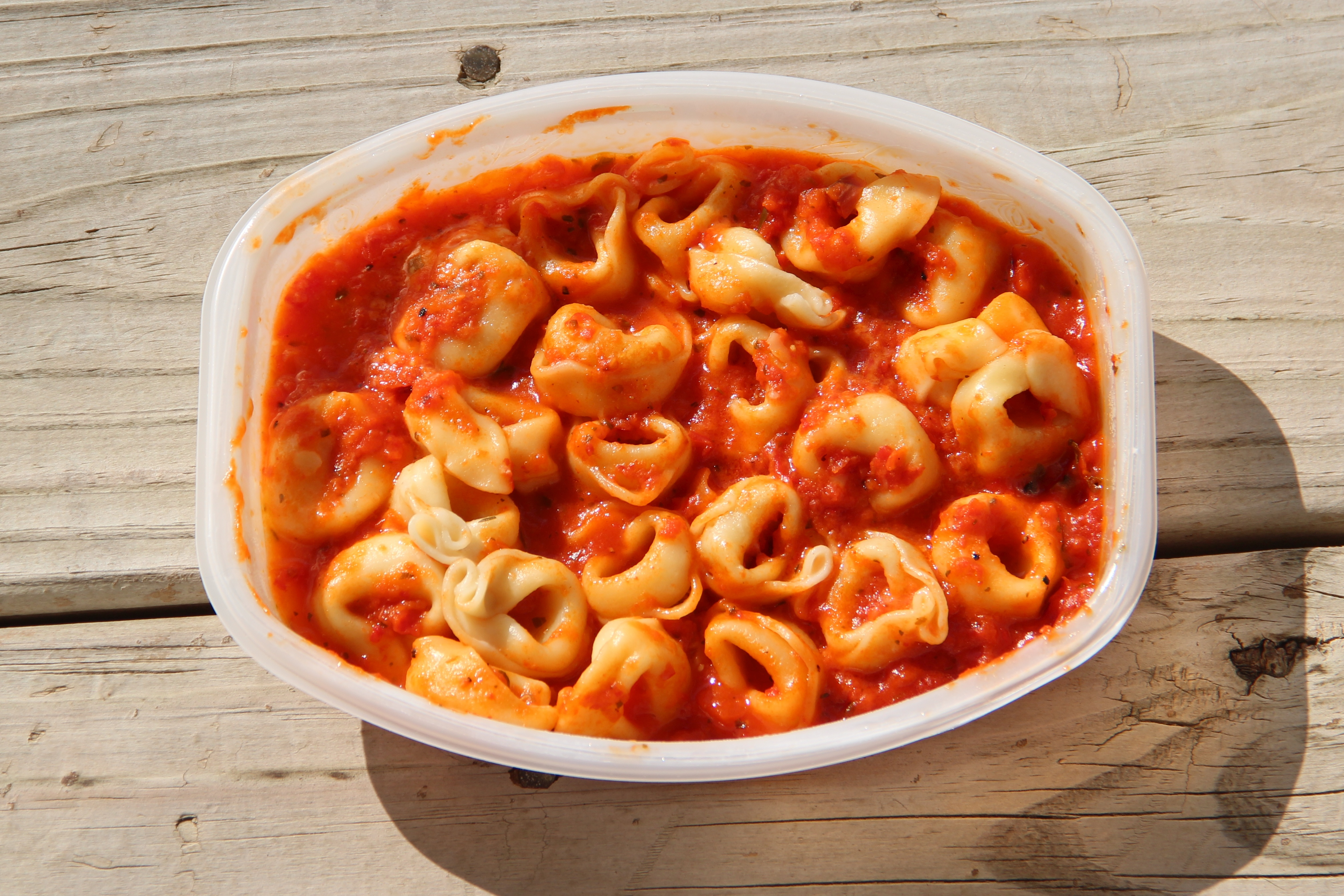
- Microwaved Lean Cuisine tortellini
- Product type: Low-calorie frozen food products
- Current owner: Nestlé (Worldwide except Australia); Vesco (Australia, under license)
- Country: United States
- Introduced: 1981; 45 years ago
- Discontinued: 2023 (Canada only)
- Related brands: Stouffer's
- Markets: Worldwide
- Tagline: Do something good for yourself!
- Website: leancuisine.com

Lean Cuisine is a brand of frozen entrées and dinners sold in the United States by Nestlé Prepared Foods, in Canada by Nestlé Canada, and in Australia by Vesco (under a licensing agreement with Nestlé). The brand began as low-fat, low-calorie versions of Stouffer's products. Today, Lean Cuisine includes traditional dinners, ethnic dishes, pizzas, whole-grain Spa Cuisine entreés, and panini. The headquarters of Nestlé Prepared Foods is located in Solon, Ohio, a suburb of Cleveland.

In February 2023, Nestlé Canada announced their intentions to wind down and exit the frozen meals and pizza business in the Canadian market within the next six months. Production and sales in the United States market are not affected by this decision and will continue.

== Overview and history ==
Lean Cuisine was created in 1981 to provide a healthier alternative to Stouffer's frozen meals. It began with ten items and has expanded to include 100+ different meals. The brand name "Lean Cuisine" is considered by the FDA as a nutrient content claim, so all Lean Cuisine items are required to meet the "lean" criteria of less than 10 g fat, 4.5 g or less saturated fat, and less than 95 mg cholesterol. Lean Cuisine items are also calorie-controlled, with most items in the 200–300 calorie range, with a minimum of 140 calories and a maximum of 400 calories.

A major competitor of Lean Cuisine is Healthy Choice, manufactured by Conagra Brands. It is required to meet "healthy" criteria by the FDA, since it includes "healthy" in its brand name. This includes a requirement to be below 480 mg of sodium in addition to fat, saturated fat, and cholesterol targets. Other competitors include Smart Ones, made by H. J. Heinz Company, and South Beach Diet, made by Kraft Heinz. There are also a number of store brand competitors, such as Safeway's Eating Right brand, Easy Meals and Optislim.

Lean Cuisine sponsors Susan G. Komen for the Cure and America on the Move.

== Varieties ==
Name and color coordinate

Comfort Classics
One Dish Favorites
Casual Eating Classics
Cafe Classics
Spa Cuisine Classics
Dinnertime Selects

=== Timeline ===
- 1981 – Brand launched with 10 items and launch communication focuses on "Good tasting entrees at less than 300 calories."
- 1983 – Tagline adopted "You'll love the way it looks on you" and strong demand leads to product shortages and apologies in print ads to consumers
- 1984 – Lean Cuisine 14-day diet plan, free booklet called "On Your Way to Being Lean" and another tagline "It's not just the calories that count, it's the taste"
- 1985 – Product line expanded to 18 items and tagline was "You'll love the taste. And you'll love the way it looks on you"
- 1986 – With competition entering category, tagline was "Only Lean Cuisine tastes like Lean Cuisine"
- 1987 – Product line expanded to 25 items, including shrimp, lamb, and veal items, Tagline "More Satisfaction", and directly targeted Weight Watchers dieters by publishing Weight Watchers exchanges for all items
- 1991 – Launched 11 new items, focused on low fat message, like "98% fat free!"
- 1992 – Launched 8 new items, including Honey Mustard Chicken, which contained a jar of Grey Poupon
- 1993 – Launched 8 more new items, including pot pies and enchilada
- 1995 – Launched Lunch Express- lower price option, eat from the box and tagline "Time to treat yourself right" and "It's not just Lean, it's Cuisine"
- 1996 – Launched Cafe Classics- more restaurant-inspired meals and look
- 1997 – Launched American Favorites- more homestyle classic American dishes
- 1998 – Launched four new Cafe Classics items
- 1999 – Launched Skillet Sensations- bag "kit" meals that cook in a pan
- 2000 – First mention of tagline "Do something good for yourself" in communications
- 2001 – Launch of Zesty Selections items- more spicy, flavorful dishes
- 2002 – Launch of Bowls and Dinnertime Selects
- 2003 – Launch of Asian product lines and pizzas
- 2004 – Launch of Low carb entrees, deep dish pizzas, and tagline "It's not just Lean, it's Cuisine" gone, replaced with "Do Something Good for Yourself"
- 2005 – Launch of Spa Cuisine- whole grain entreés and Dinnertime Selects with dessert
- 2006 – Preservatives eliminated from most (80+) items, launch of Panini sandwiches and Brick Oven style pizzas
- 2007 – Launch of five Spa Cuisine items with twice the vegetables and two additional panini sandwiches
- 2008 – Launch of four Flatbread melts
- 2010 – "The Book of Truth" campaign debuts
- 2018 - Launch of vegan frozen meals
