= Weight Watchers =

Weight Watchers or WW may refer to:

- Weight Watchers (diet), a comprehensive weight loss program and diet
- WW International, the company producing the Weight Watchers diet
- "WEIGHT WATCHERS," a song by Melanie Martinez
