= Leprino Foods =

American food company

Leprino Foods Company

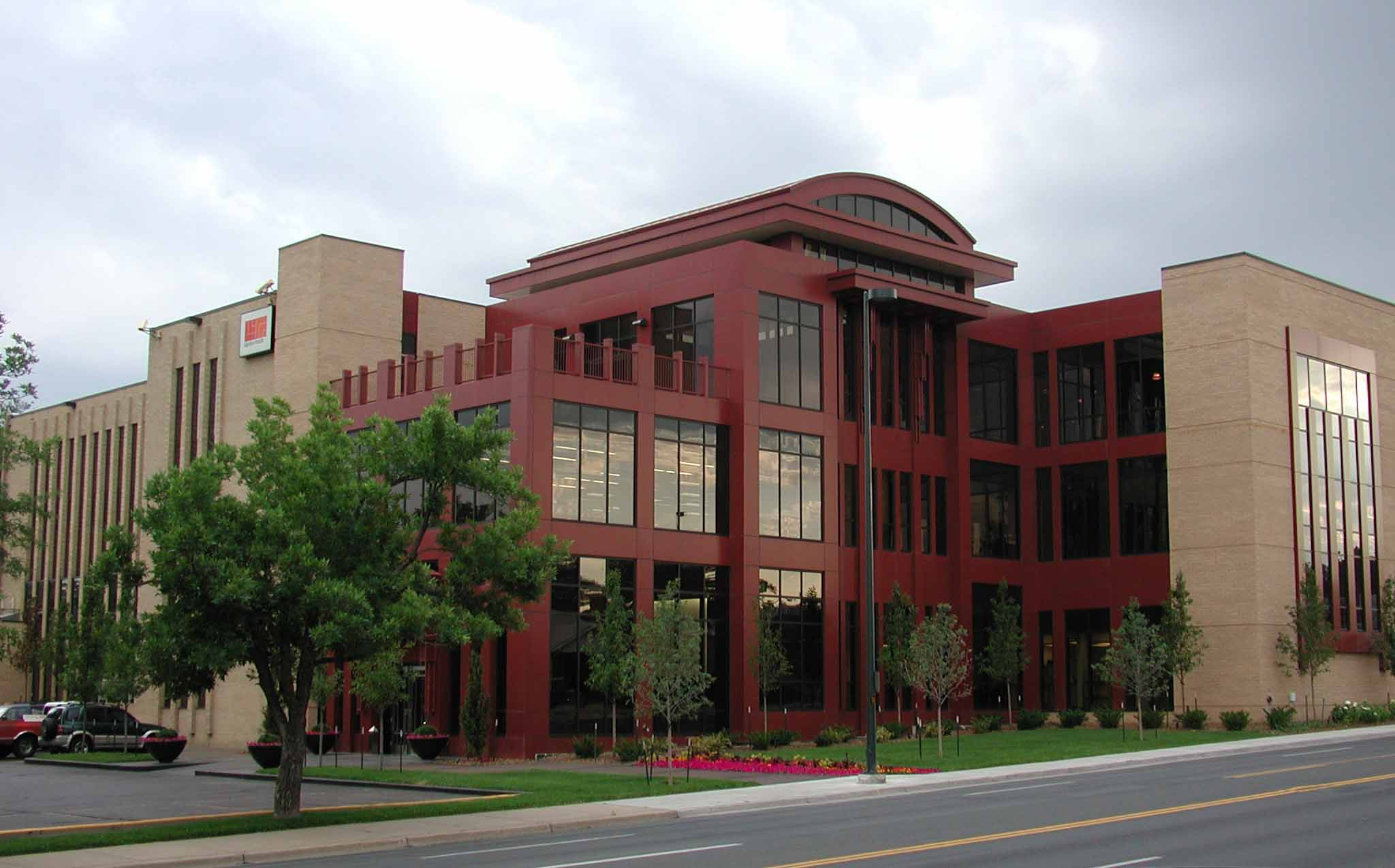
- Type: Private
- Industry: Food manufacturing
- Founded: 1950; 76 years ago
- Headquarters: Denver, Colorado, U.S.
- Key people: Mike Leprino (founder); Lance FitzSimmons (President & CEO)
- Products: Cheese, Dairy ingredients
- Number of employees: 5,500+ (2025)
- Website: www.leprino.com

Leprino Foods is an American company with headquarters in Denver, Colorado that produces cheese, lactose, whey protein and sweet whey. It is the world's largest maker of mozzarella cheese.

== Overview ==
Leprino Foods was founded by James Leprino's father Mike Leprino in 1950 as a family-owned market selling grocery items and handmade cheese in Denver. It was first sold under the Gina Marie brand. Leprino Foods has facilities in Waverly, New York; Remus, Michigan; Allendale, Michigan; Lubbock, Texas; Greeley, Colorado; Fort Morgan, Colorado; Roswell, New Mexico; Singapore; Tracy, California; and Lemoore, California. It operates plants in Brazil (PicNic brand), Northern Ireland and Wales. The company's cheeses include mozzarella, reduced-fat Monterey jack, provolone, reduced-fat cheddar and various cheese blends, mainly for pizzeria and food service operators, frozen food manufacturers and private-label cheese packagers. Leprino supplies cheese to 85% of the pizza market, including Pizza Hut, Domino's, Little Caesars, Papa John's, Godfather's Pizza, Hungry Howie's, Tombstone, Tony's, Jack's, and Digiorno. Their cheese and products are also used by Hot Pockets, Stouffer's, Smart Ones, and other products used in Yoplait yogurt, Pillsbury Toaster Strudel, and baby formula. Leprino is the US's largest exporter of lactose. They sell one billion pounds of cheese per year for $3 billion.

In 2016, Leprino launched the Ascent Protein line of whey protein.

In 2009, it was ranked by Forbes as the 165th largest private company in the United States. By 2025, it had moved up one spot to be the 164th largest private company in the United States.
