= Marisa Meltzer =

American journalist and writer

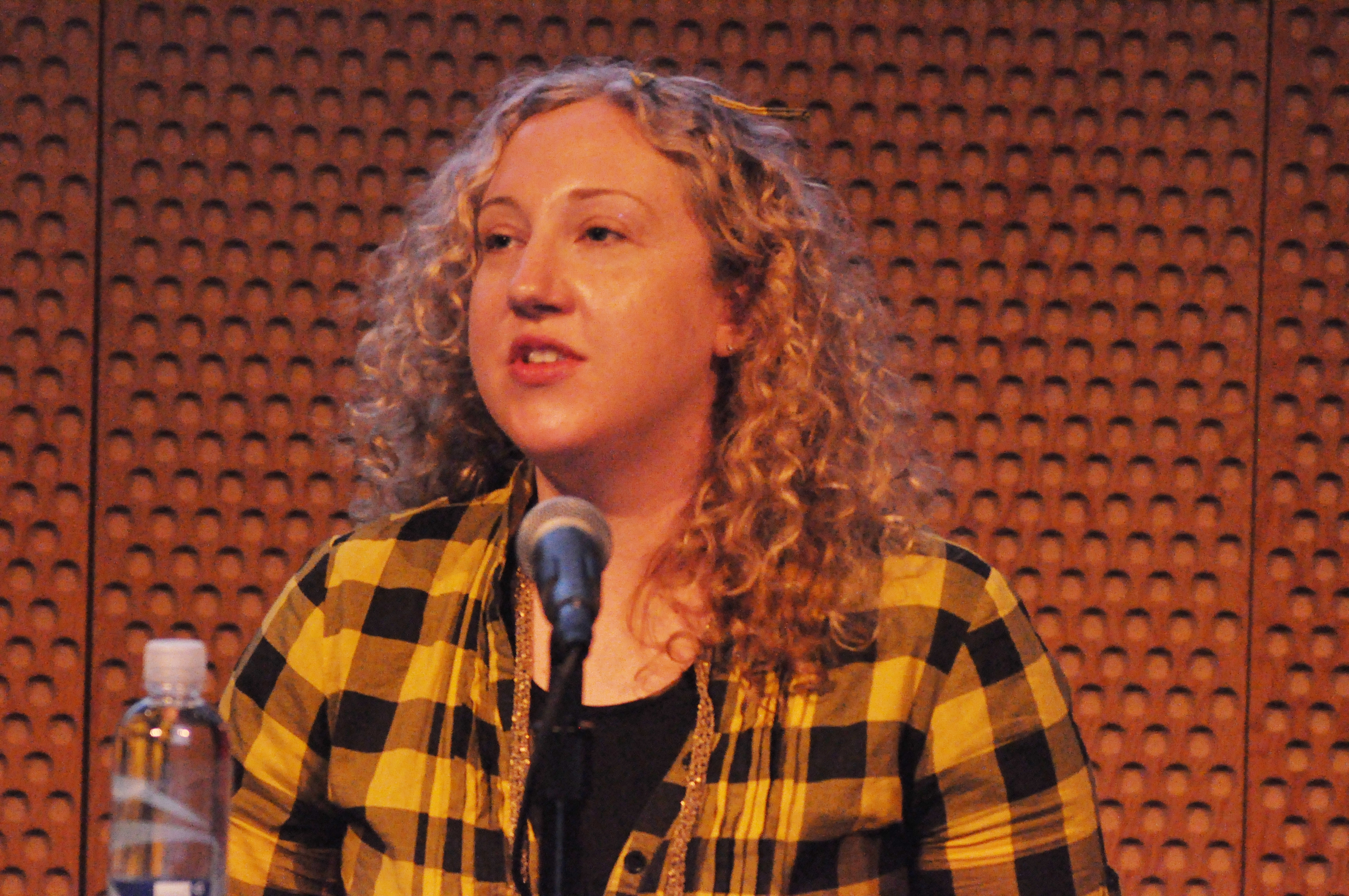
Meltzer in 2010

Marisa Meltzer is an American freelance journalist, humorist, and book author known for her dishy writing style.

== Early life and education ==
Growing up, Meltzer accompanied her mother to protests against the Miss California pageant and to Gloria Steinem lectures, but her mother was careful to stay thin. She attended Evergreen State College in Olympia, Washington.

== Career ==
Meltzer's wellness column for the New York Times was called "Me Time". Her third book, This is Big, tells the story of the founder of Weight Watchers, Jean Nidetch, while incorporating anecdotes from her own weight-loss journey. Her New York Times bestseller Glossy, which is being adapted for TV, was inspired by Meltzer's Vanity Fair profile of Emily Weiss. Meltzer was interested in the power that beauty advertisers have, the girl-boss movement, venture capital, and the changing beauty standards in contemporary culture.

== Books ==
- How Sassy Changed My Life: A Love Letter to the Greatest Teen Magazine of All Time (2007, with Kara Jesella) ISBN 978-0-571-21185-2
- Girl Power: The Nineties Revolution in Music (2010) ISBN 978-0-86547-979-1
- This Is Big: How the Founder of Weight Watchers Changed the World -- and Me (2020) ISBN 978-0-316-41400-5
- Glossy: Ambition, Beauty, and the Inside Story of Emily Weiss's Glossier (2023) ISBN 978-1-9821-9060-6
- It Girl: The Life and Legacy of Jane Birkin (2025) ISBN 978-1-6680-6028-5

== Personal life ==
Meltzer lives in Brooklyn. She finds comfort from baths, massages, alone time, and Nespresso.
