= John Cahill =

John Cahill may refer to:

- John Cahill (baseball), former Major League Baseball outfielder
- John Cahill (footballer), retired Australian rules football player and coach
- John Cahill (businessman), British businessman, and former Executive Chairman of British Aerospace
- John Cahill (bishop), Roman Catholic Bishop of Portsmouth
- John T. Cahill (lawyer), American lawyer and prosecutor
- John T. Cahill (businessman), American businessman
- John Joseph Cahill, Premier of New South Wales from 1952 to 1959
- John Cahill (wrestler), American professional wrestler
