= Doris Davis Centini =

Food scientist and home economist

Doris Davis Centini (October 7, 1931 – May 13, 2001) was a food scientist and home economist who led Stouffer's Food's home economics department. She served as manager of research and development at Stouffer's during development of the Stouffer's portions of the Apollo 11 space crew's meals eaten in quarantine on their return from space. She applied her home economics background in helping to develop Stouffer's freeze-dried method. One of her aides in that department was food scientist Julie Stewart.

Centini was born Doris Nelle Davis on October 7, 1931, in Blountsville, Alabama.

Centini graduated from the Women's College of the University of North Carolina in 1953.

== See also ==
- Sara Thompson (food scientist)
- Julie Stewart (food scientist)
