= Louis Szathmary =

Hungarian-American chef, writer and public personality

- Louis Szathmary portrait by Faith Bennett
- Born: June 2, 1919
- Died: October 4, 1996 (aged 77); Chicago
- Culinary career
- Cooking style: Continental
- Current restaurant
- The Bakery

Louis Szathmary (born Lajos István Szathmáry II June 2, 1919 – October 4, 1996) was a Hungarian-American chef, writer, and public personality. A pioneering force in the food service profession, he is best known for heading the Chicago restaurant The Bakery and writing the New York Times bestseller The Chef's Secret Cookbook. Szathmary's involvement with the early frozen food industry, his numerous cookbooks and articles and his persona established him as an icon in the culinary arts industry.

== Early life ==
Louis Szathmary was born on June 2, 1919, on a train heading from Transylvania to Budapest as his parents fled the post World War I Hungarian–Romanian War. He earned his master's degree in journalism and doctorate in psychology from the University of Budapest before being drafted into the Hungarian army to serve in World War II. Szathmary originally served as a psychologist to Hungarian Army men, before transferring positions to Army private, where he wrote manuals, including one for cooking. Subsequently, he enrolled in a Hungarian chef's school and took an advanced course.

== Move to United States ==
In 1951, Szathmary emigrated to the United States, arriving in New York City from Bremerhaven speaking no English, with $1.10 in his pocket. Once there, he found work as a short-order cook and worked his way up through the ranks, honing his skills until he catered to the East Coast's elite. In 1959, he moved to Chicago to work for Armour and Company, where he developed frozen food lines for various food companies, including Stouffer Corporation. Stouffer's classic Frozen Spinach Souffle is one of Szathmary's creations. He continued to pioneer the rapidly changing food industry, working with new ideas including freeze drying and boil-in bags. Some of Szathmary's creations were used by NASA and accompanied astronauts in space.

== The Bakery restaurant ==
Operating from 1963 to 1989, Szathmary's Chicago restaurant, The Bakery, served what Szathmary referred to as "continental dishes with American undertones". The inclusion of "exotic" European dishes expanded the fine dining in Chicago and made The Bakery a popular destination. The individual beef Wellington was particularly famous, and heavily cited on Chicago diners' must-try lists. Within its first year of operation, more than 200 articles were written about The Bakery. The restaurant attracted guests internationally, and Szathmary hosted parties for Hugh Hefner, Frank Zappa, and conductor Arthur Fiedler.

== Personal life ==
=== Image ===
Szathmary embraced his public persona, providing guest appearances on over 150 network and local television shows, including the Oprah Winfrey Show and Good Morning America throughout the United States and more than 1,000 appearances on radio shows. He was also featured in magazine and television commercials for companies including Lipton Tea, Sears, Jim Beam and Christian Dior. He regularly connected with fans, hiring three secretaries to help respond to fan mail and coordinate his touring schedule.

=== Collecting ===
A self-professed bibliophile, Szathmary began collecting books shortly after arriving in America, which culminated in a collection of 45,000 books and culinary materials. Szathmary was raised in a bookish family that had a standing account with a book dealer since the 1790s. Szathmary's collection comprises culinary books and handwritten manuscripts, a menu collection, Hungarian collections, and letters from Hungarian composer Franz Liszt. Szathmary stored his collection in the upstairs rooms of The Bakery restaurant building in thirty-one rooms in seventeen apartments. This immense collection has been divided and donated to various universities and institutions: The Szathmary Culinary Collection at the University of Iowa, the Szathmary Hungarica Collection at the University of Chicago, a collection of personal papers at DePaul University in Chicago, a collection of letters to and from Franz Liszt donated to the Liszt collection at Boston University and a 400,000-item culinary arts collection including menus which became the foundation for the Culinary Archives and Museum at Johnson & Wales University in Providence, Rhode Island.

=== Marriage and family ===
At the time of Szathmary's death, survivors included his wife, Sadako "Sada" Tanino, with whom he opened The Bakery restaurant; a daughter, Magda; and a brother. The Tanino-Szathmary family papers are held at the Japanese American Service Committee of Chicago.

== Honors and accolades ==
Louis Szathmary received many awards for his contribution to the culinary arts industry.

- In 1974, he was awarded the title of Outstanding Culinarian by the Culinary Institute of America
- In 1977, he was elected Man of the Year by the Penn State Hotel and Restaurant Society
- In 1988, awarded "Distinguished Visiting Chef" from Johnson & Wales University.
- The alley behind the Bakery was renamed Szathmary Lane by the Chicago City Council in 1990
- Received the Food Arts presents July/August 1995 Silver Spoon Award for sterling performance for elevating the professional status of chefs.
- May 1990 Honorary Doctorate of Culinary Arts from Johnson & Wales University

== Bibliography ==
Szathmary was a prolific writer. From 1978 to 1987, he wrote a Thursday column for the Chicago Sunday Times, as well as a "Chef Louis" column for a wire service that appeared in over one hundred newspapers. He served as an editor for the 1973 edition of the 15-volume "Cookery Americana" series, in addition to writing several of his own cookbooks.

=== Cookbooks ===
- American Gastronomy: An Illustrated Portfolio of Recipes and Culinary history (1974), ISBN 978-0809283415
- The Bakery Restaurant Cookbook (1980), ISBN 978-0843621952
- The Chef's New Secret Cookbook (1975), ISBN 978-0809283545
- The Chef's Secret Cook Book: A Practical, Personal Invitation to Classic Cookery (1971), ISBN 978-0812902136
- Sears Gourmet Cooking Forum (1969)

=== Cookery Americana Series ===
- Along the Northern Border: Cookery in Idaho, Minnesota, and North Dakota (1973), ISBN 9780405050411
- Cooking in Old Creole Days (1973), ISBN 978-0405050466
- Cool, Chill and Freeze: A New Approach to Cookery (1973), ISBN 978-0405050442
- Directions for Cookery in its Various Branches (1973), ISBN 9780405050503
- Fifty Years of Prairie Cooking (1973), ISBN 978-0405050473
- Hand-Book of Practical Cookery (1973), ISBN 0-405-05042-9
- High Living: Recipes from Southern Climes (1973), ISBN 9780405050510
- Home Cookery, Ladies Indispensable Companion: Cookery in Northeastern Cities (1973), ISBN 978-0405050435
- The Improved Housewife (1973), ISBN 9780405050558
- The Kansas Home Cook-Book (1973), ISBN 9780405050459
- Midwestern Home Cookery (1973), ISBN 978-0883940174
- Mrs. Porter's New Southern Cookery Book (1973), ISBN 9780405050534
- One Hundred Recipes for the Chafing Dish (1973), ISBN 9780405050480
- Six Little Cooks (1973), ISBN 9780405050497
- Southwestern Cookery: Indian and Spanish Influences (1973), ISBN 978-0405050541
