= David Monn =

American event planner, interior designer, author, and artist

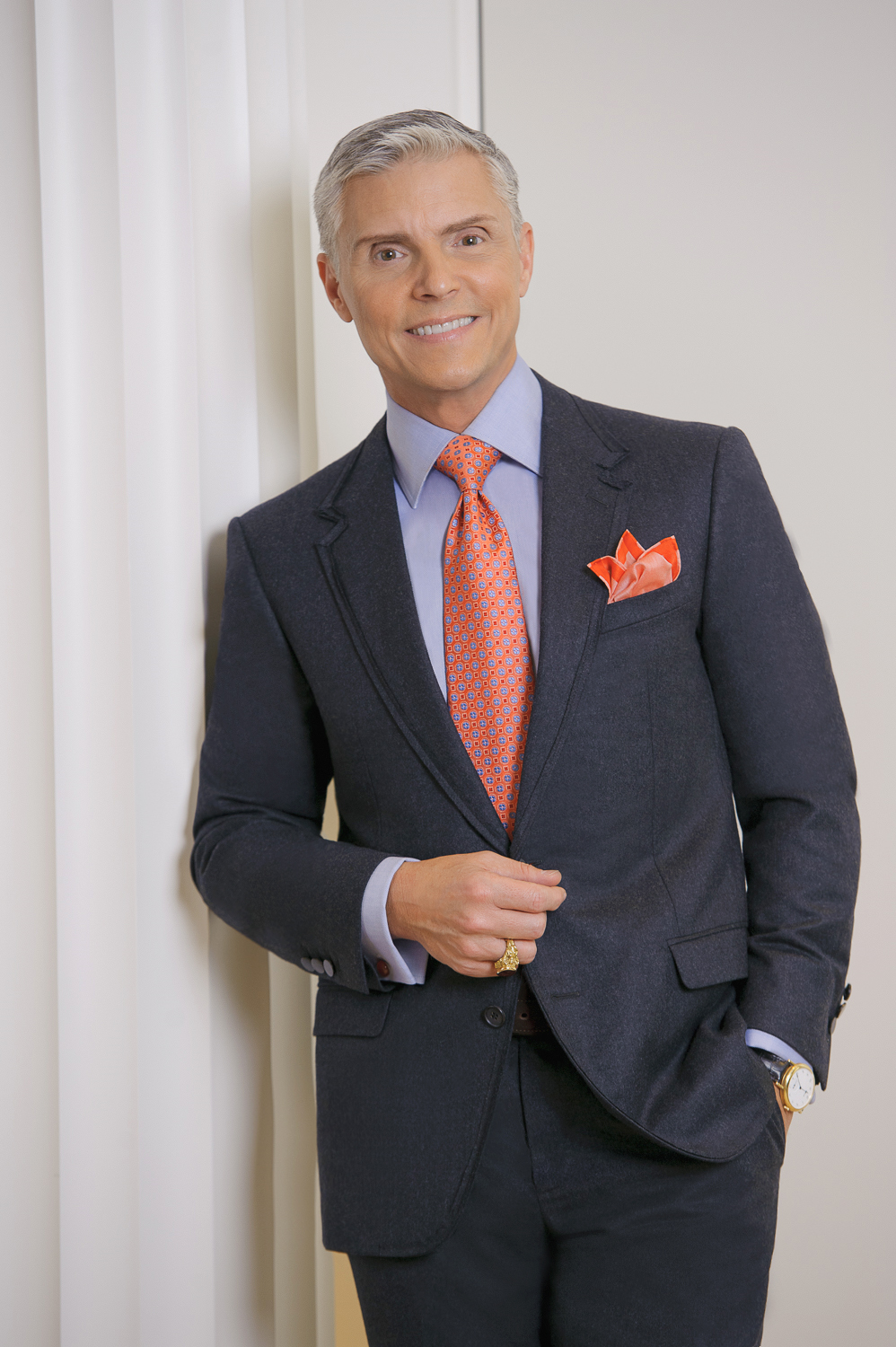
- Born: Fayetteville, Pennsylvania, U.S.
- Occupations: Event planner; Interior designer; Author; Artist
- Known for: Founder/CEO of David Monn, LLC
- Website: davidmonn.com

David Monn is an American event planner, interior designer, author, and artist. He is the founder and CEO of David Monn, LLC, an event production firm based in New York City. As part of the firm, Monn has been responsible for organizing and producing a variety of prominent events at locations like the Metropolitan Museum of Art, the New York Public Library, Guggenheim Museum, among others. Hired to plan events for the 2017 inauguration of United States president Donald Trump, Monn received $3.7 million for his services, including nearly $1 million for "seven-foot-high wreaths, moss-covered obelisks, flowers and other decorations to dress up Union Station." He was eventually rehired to plan the 2025 inauguration.

Monn designed a White House State Dinner for former United States president Barack Obama. Monn's most recent book, David Monn: The Art of Celebrating, was released in November 2016.

== Early life ==
Monn was born and raised in Fayetteville, Pennsylvania, as one of six children. As a child, he showed an early interest in fashion design with hopes of attending the Parsons School of Design. In 1981 at age 18, Monn worked at Butte Knit, a clothing factory in his town that was a part of the Jonathan Logan Corporation. He subsequently moved to New York City where he rented a studio apartment near Mindy Grossman's. While in New York, Monn took up interior decorating for himself and his friends (including Grossman).

== Career ==
Prior to beginning his event and interior design career, Monn worked in the jewelry business for 12 years. In 2003, Gayfryd Steinberg hired Monn as the event planner and designer for the Library Lions Gala at the New York Public Library's main campus. Since then, Monn has designed events for a variety of occasions. In 2004, he managed the festivities for the grand opening of the Time Warner Center, and in 2005 designed the Metropolitan Museum of Art's Costume Institute Gala. By 2007, his clients included the Guggenheim Museum, LVMH, and the Metropolitan Opera. In November 2007, Monn designed the Frank Gehry-inspired Guggenheim International Gala at Pier 40. He also designed the 100th anniversary celebration for the Plaza Hotel that year.

In May 2010, Monn designed the White House State Dinner honoring then Mexican President Felipe Calderón. In November 2016, he published a book, David Monn: The Art of Celebrating. The book's release date was marked with a party at the New York Public Library's main campus.

In January 2017, Stepanie Winston Wolkoff hired Monn to design an opening candlelight dinner for the inauguration festivities of President Donald Trump. At that event, "[m]akeup was provided for 20 staff members at a cost of $500 per person. For the dinner …, table menus, table numbers and place cards, including an on-site calligrapher to correct last-minute mistakes, amounted to $91 per guest." Working without a contract at his own insistence, Monn received $3.7 million from the Trump inaugural committee.

== Bibliography ==
Publication year	Title	Original publisher	ISBN	Notes
2016	David Monn: The Art of Celebrating	Vendome Press	ISBN 9780865653276	
1993	365 Ways to Prepare for Christmas	HarperCollins	ISBN 9780060170486	
