= Mark Sisson =

American endurance athlete

- Born: July 20, 1953 (age 73)
- Education: Williams College
- Occupations: Triathlete, marathoner, author

Mark Sisson (born July 20, 1953) is an American fitness author, food blogger, and a former distance runner, triathlete and Ironman competitor.

== Biography ==
Sisson was born in Maine and is the oldest of four siblings. He attended Williams College, where he was a pre-med candidate and earned a biology degree.

Sisson finished 4th in the February 1982 Ironman World Championship. In the 1970s, he was a record-setting runner for the Portland (Maine) Track Club. He had a top-5 finish in the 1980 U.S. National Marathon Championships and earned a qualifying spot for the 1980 U.S. Olympic Trials.

He is a follower of the paleo diet and markets his own version of it, called the "Primal Blueprint" diet. As part of this initiative, he started a food blog, "Mark's Daily Apple," in 2006 and has also written a number of diet and exercise books;

Sisson served for 15 years as chairman of the International Triathlon Union (ITU) Anti-Doping Commission and as the ITU's liaison to the International Olympic Committee.

== Primal Kitchen ==
In 2015, Sisson and Morgan Buehler co-founded Primal Kitchen, "an authentic, premium and growing brand that ... offer[s] health-conscious consumers the best possible choices in Condiments, Sauces, Dressings and Healthy Snacks." In 2018, Kraft Heinz announced a definitive agreement to acquire Primal Kitchen for approximately $200 million.

== Primal Health Coach Institute ==
In 2017, Sisson co-founded Primal Health Coach Institute, a health coach certification school, with business partner Aaron Fox.

== Peluva ==
In 2021, Sisson and his son, Kyle Sisson co-founded Peluva, a barefoot shoe brand.

== Bibliography ==
- The Primal Blueprint (2009, ISBN 978-0982207703)
- The Primal Connection (2013, ISBN 978-0984755103)
- The New Primal Blueprint (2016, ISBN 978-1939563309)
- The Keto Reset Diet (2017, ISBN 978-1524762230)
- Primal Endurance (2015, ISBN 978-1939563088)
- Two Meals a Day (2021, ISBN 978-1538736951)
- Born to Walk (2025, ISBN 978-1736294413)
