= Julie Stewart (food scientist) =

American food scientist

Julie Stewart was an American food scientist. She began working at Stouffer's Food's in 1957, first starting in the shipping department and then moving into food development. She was an aide to Doris Davis Centini at Stouffer's Food's during development of the Stouffer's portions of the Apollo 11 space crew's meals eaten in quarantine on their return from space in 1969. Her responsibilities included designing recipes, and NASA selected one of her recipes, Salisbury Stroganoff, for inclusion in the Apollo 11 crew's menu.

== See also ==
- Sara Thompson (food scientist)
- Doris Davis Centini
