= Sara Thompson (food scientist) =

Food scientist

Sara Thompson was a food scientist. She was the quality control supervisor at Stouffer's Food's and worked with Doris Davis Centini during development of the Stouffer's portions of the Apollo 11 space crew's meals eaten in quarantine on their return from space.

== Apollo 11 ==
Stouffer’s emphasized purity and quality for all of their astronaut food. In her role as a quality control supervisor at Stouffer’s laboratory, Thompson was responsible for evaluating food and its packaging for potential toxins that could develop. She checked raw materials visually, chemically, and bacteriologically before allowing the packaged food to be produced. Specifically, she ensured that no salmonella, staph, or E. Coli were present, as well as made sure that the total bacteria and coliform count did not exceed specified levels. This was done to ensure that all the products met safety standards set by NASA, Stouffer, and the FDA.

== See also ==
- Apollo 11
- Doris Davis Centini
- Julie Stewart (food scientist)
