= James Leprino =

American businessman and cheese magnate (1937–2025)

- Born: November 22, 1937; Denver, Colorado, U.S.
- Died: June 19, 2025 (aged 87)
- Occupations: Chairman and CEO, Leprino Foods
- Children: 2

James Gerald Leprino (November 22, 1937 – June 19, 2025) was an American billionaire businessman who was the chairman of Leprino Foods, the world's largest manufacturer of mozzarella cheese, which controls up to 85% of the U.S. pizza cheese market. He was listed as the 264th richest person in the U.S., with a net worth of $3.1 billion according to the 2017 Forbes 400 list. He was deemed by Forbes' as the "Willy Wonka of cheese".

== Early life ==
James Gerald Leprino was born in Denver, Colorado on November 22, 1937. He was the youngest of five sons of Mike Leprino Sr., who emigrated from Italy in 1914, aged 16, settled in Denver, and was a farm worker before starting a grocery store Leprino & Sons in 1950 in Denver's Little Italy. They made handmade ricotta, ravioli and a type of mozzarella known as scamorza.

== Career ==
After graduating from high school in 1956, he worked full-time with his father, but due to pressure from large grocery chains, his father's store closed in 1958. James hung out at local pizza stores with friends and saw how much cheese they went through and believed it could be a good business. He joined the family business Leprino Foods with $615, focusing on making cheese for pizza. This was at about the same time Pizza Hut and Little Caesars were opening their first stores.

The company rapidly grew alongside the American taste for pizza. When Pizza Hut began rapidly expanding in 1968, they turned to Leprino, who came up with a way of avoiding the traditional cheese shredding process in the store and layer on frozen product instead, simplifying the process and reducing cost and labor. Leprino Foods became the largest manufacturer of mozzarella cheese in the world, over which James Leprino reigned as CEO and Chairman. It supplies major pizza chains including Pizza Hut, Domino's, Papa John's and Little Caesars, and controls up to 85% of the U.S. pizza cheese market.

The company made many innovations to accommodate the needs for industrial-scale pizza making, including the introduction of spray-on additives that change the behavior of cheese in the oven, allowing the pizza chains to differentiate their product from each other. They reduced the natural aging process for mozzarella from 14 days to a mere four hours. They created a "preservative mist". They made cheese that could be baked on pizzas even while the cheese was frozen. Laprino credited Lester Kielsmeier, a cheesemaker from Wisconsin, who ultimately became the lead author of more than a dozen Leprino Foods patents. "I would tell people, ‘Lester is the man that made me rich,’", Leprino said.

In October 2017, his net worth was estimated by Forbes at US$3.1 billion. In 2022, his two nieces, who hold a 25% stake in Leprino Foods, filed a lawsuit claiming they, as minority shareholders, were disfavored in terms of profitability and global management. The nieces requested Leprino Foods be dissolved and its assets be distributed among all shareholders. A Colorado judge ruled out dismantlement of the company, but their claims of inequitable treatment could go forward.

== Personal life and death ==
Leprino was married with two children. He resided in Indian Hills, Colorado.

Leprino was secretive, rarely speaking with journalists.

Leprino died on June 19, 2025, at the age of 87. It is unknown where he died or what cause.

== Political lobbying and support ==
From 1990 to 2017, Leprino Foods contributed $1,521,894 to political lobbying, with 75 to 80 percent of Leprino's political contributions going to Republicans.
