= Ox & Palm =

Canned meat product

- Product type: Bully beef, Corned beef, Canned meat
- Country: Australia
- Markets: Australia
- Tagline: '
- Website: https://www.oxandpalmcornedbeef.com/

Ox & Palm is a canned lunch meat product similar to Spam first introduced in 1936 in Australia.

Ox & Palm is manufactured by Kraft Heinz.

Ox & Palm was the naming rights partner for the Rugby League Pacific Championships from 2019 to 2020.

== See also ==
- Potted meat food product
- Spam (food)
- Treet
