= Smart Ones =

Brand of frozen food products

- Product type: Frozen food products
- Current owner: The Kraft Heinz Company
- Country: United States
- Introduced: 1992; 34 years ago
- Related brands: SmartMade; Indulgence
- Markets: United States; Canada
- Website: eatyourbest.com/smartones

Smart Ones is a brand of frozen food products, including frozen breakfasts, snacks, entrées, and desserts, which are produced in the U.S. and sold in the U.S. and Canada by The Kraft Heinz Company.

== Overview and history ==
The Smart Ones brand was launched by the H.J Heinz Company in 1992 as a sub-brand of the Weight Watchers line of frozen entrées and desserts. At the time, Heinz owned Weight Watchers International, with its weight-loss program and services. At launch, the Smart Ones line was promoted as containing only "ONE gram of fat". Later, the meal offerings were expanded significantly and were no longer limited to one gram of fat.

In 1999, Heinz sold Weight Watchers International but retained a license to use the Weight Watchers trademarks in connection with various food products. In 2015, Oprah Winfrey joined Weight Watchers as an investor and member. Winfrey had previously called out Smart Ones on her website as a healthy frozen meal option.

== Timeline ==
- 1992: Weight Watchers Smart Ones line launched as a sub-brand of Weight Watchers® frozen meals.
- 1998: Heinz consolidates the Weight Watchers frozen meals under the Weight Watchers® Smart Ones® brand name. The line includes breakfasts, entrées and desserts.
- 2004: Weight Watchers Smart Ones introduces frozen pizzas.
- 2007: Weight Watchers Smart Ones introduces frozen pizza snacks.
- 2008: Weight Watchers Smart Ones re-launches frozen breakfasts.
- 2011: Weight Watchers Smart Ones introduces Satisfying Selections, larger portioned frozen meals sold in bags which were later discontinued in 2014.
- 2013: Weight Watchers Smart Ones introduces frozen oatmeals and frozen soups.
- 2015: Weight Watchers Smart Ones launches frozen smoothies.
