= Miguel Patricio =

Portuguese businessperson (1949 - 2018)

- Born: 1966 or 1967 (age 59–60)
- Occupation: Businessman
- Title: CEO, Kraft Heinz
- Term: July 2019 - December 2020
- Predecessor: Bernardo Hees
- Successor: Carlos Abrams-Rivera
- Spouse: Jill Patricio
- Children: 3

Miguel Patricio (born 1966/1967) is a Portuguese businessman, and former CEO of Kraft Heinz. He succeeded Bernardo Hees in July 2019. He was replaced by Carlos Abrams-Rivera in January 2024.

== Early life ==
Patricio was born in Portugal. He graduated in business administration from FGV EAESP in 1989.

== Career ==
Early in his career, Patricio worked for Philip Morris International, Coca-Cola and Johnson & Johnson. Patricio then worked for Anheuser-Busch InBev for two decades, rising to chief marketing officer, from 2012 until July 2018.
