= Steve Cahillane =

American business executive

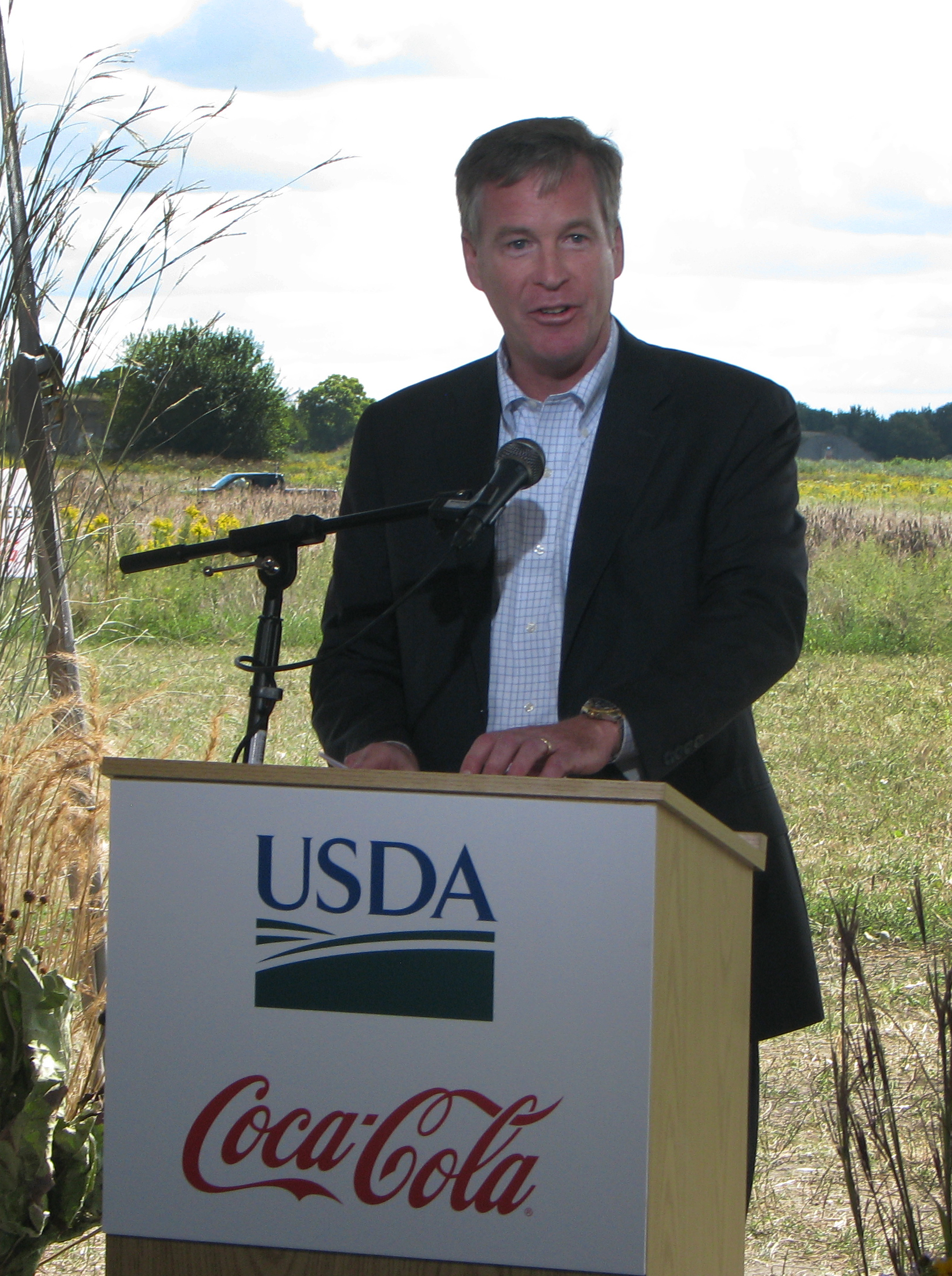
- Cahillane in 2013
- Born: 1965 (age 60–61); United States
- Education: Northwestern University (BA); Harvard Business School (MBA)
- Title: CEO of Kraft Heinz
- Spouse: Tracy
- Children: 4

Steve Cahillane (born 1965) is an American business executive, and the chief executive officer (CEO) of Kraft Heinz since January 2026.

== Early life and education ==
Cahillane is one of four children of a New York firefighter with roots in Co Kerry, Ireland and a mother born and raised in Donegal, Ireland. He earned a B.A. in political science from Northwestern University and an MBA from Harvard Business School.

== Career ==
In December 2013, Cahillane abruptly left Coca-Cola, which had experienced disappointing results in its North American and Latin American units, "to pursue other opportunities". Following his departure from Coca-Cola, Cahillane became CEO of Nature's Bounty in 2014. In October 2017, Cahillane joined Kellogg's as CEO, and also became chairman in March 2018.

In January 2026, he became the CEO of Kraft Heinz, when he succeeded Carlos Abrams-Rivera.

In February 2026, he paused the planned separation of Kraft Heinz and announced a $600 million investment in marketing, sales and research and development, as well as product improvements and pricing.

== Personal life ==
He is married to Tracy, they have four children and were residing in Atlanta in 2014.
