= Carlos Abrams-Rivera =

CEO

- Born: April 25, 1967 (age 59); Puerto Rico
- Education: Carnegie Mellon University University of Michigan
- Occupation: Business executive
- Title: Former CEO of Kraft Heinz
- Term: Jan. 2024 - Jan. 2026
- Predecessor: Miguel Patricio
- Successor: Steve Cahillane

Carlos Abrams-Rivera (born April 25, 1967) is a Puerto Rican business executive. He was the CEO of Kraft Heinz from January 2024 to January 2026, when he was succeeded by Steve Cahillane.

== Early life and education ==
Born April 25, 1967, he was born and raised in Puerto Rico. He earned a degree in economics from Carnegie Mellon University, then worked for two years as a government aide in Puerto Rico, and then earned an MBA from the University of Michigan in 1994.

== Career ==
He started his career at Kraft Foods, and afterwards worked at Mondelez and Campbell's. Abrams-Rivera held roles at Energizer Holdings, and the Government of Puerto Rico. As of January 2020, he was president at Campbell Snacks.

=== Kraft Heinz CEO ===
In January 2020, Kraft Heinz named him leader of its US business. From August 2023 to the end of the year, he was Kraft Heinz president and led operations in the US and Canada. He became CEO and joined the board of Kraft Heinz Co. on January 1, 2024.

Under Abrams-Rivera's leadership, Kraft Heinz's sales fell for seven straight quarters, and Kraft Heinz decided in September 2025 September to split into two companies, a global one focused on sauces, spreads and seasonings, and one selling grocery staples in North America, with Abrams-Rivera to head the latter. However, they later chose to replace him with Steve Cahillane, who had been CEO of Kellogg's. In October 2025, Kraft Heinz lowered its sales outlook, with Abrams-Rivera as CEO stating that the sentiment of US shoppers had dropped to a "historic low." He was the CEO until January 2026, when he was succeeded by Cahillane.
