= Kurbo =

Healthy eating program for children

- Release: 2013
- Operating system: Android. iOS and web
- Type: Diet and nutrition
- Website: kurbo.com

Kurbo is a digital therapeutics program focused on sustainable healthy eating for children and teenagers. The program tracks and manages nutrition, exercise and weight of adolescents. It operates through a mobile application and a website, providing health coaching from weight loss and behavior change professionals to tackle childhood obesity.

Kurbo was acquired by WW International (formerly Weight Watchers) in August 2019 and the Kurbo app was launched by Weight Watchers (WW International) in December 2020.

== History ==
Kurbo Health was founded in July 2013 in Palo Alto, California by Joanna Strober, Mark Vershel and Thea Runyan. The program is based on research on pediatric weight control and is licensed from Stanford University Lucile Packard Children's Hospital pediatric obesity program. It is known for its traffic light food classification system and portion sizing design. The app was first launched at TechCrunch Disrupt NY 2014.

Kurbo was acquired by Weight Watchers in 2018 for a reported $3 million. The company spent time further developing the app before rebranding and releasing Kurbo by WW in December 2020.

== Functionality ==
Kurbo is designed to teach children how to manage their eating habits in an educational manner. It provides a single set of APIs for the mobile application and online program to track and access activity data of the users. It is accompanied by interaction with a health and behavioral coach who provide personalized suggestions, feedback and encouragement to the users.

== Studies and feedback ==
A pilot program in 2014 demonstrated that Kurbo improved engagement and helped children reduce their BMI percentile. The Journal of Medical Internet Research published a study in 2019 on Impact of a Mobile App-Based Health Coaching and Behavior Change Program on Participant Engagement and Weight Status of Overweight and Obese Children. This study analyzed the effectiveness of Kurbo's program and inferred that increased coaching sessions led to increased BMI reduction.

A New York Times article by dietician Christy Harrison and a statement by the National Eating Disorders Association (NEDA) opposed the use of the app raising concern over children's diet and psychological implications.

=== Controversy ===
In March 2022, the Federal Trade Commission filed a complaint against Kurbo, alleging that Weight Watchers and Kurbo violated the Children's Online Privacy Protection Act of 1998 (COPPA) when they collected the personal information of children using the app without parental consent. Kurbo was ordered to delete all information collected from children under 13, destroy any algorithms created with this data, and pay a penalty of $1.5 million.
