= Kraft Heinz =

American multinational food company

The Kraft Heinz Company

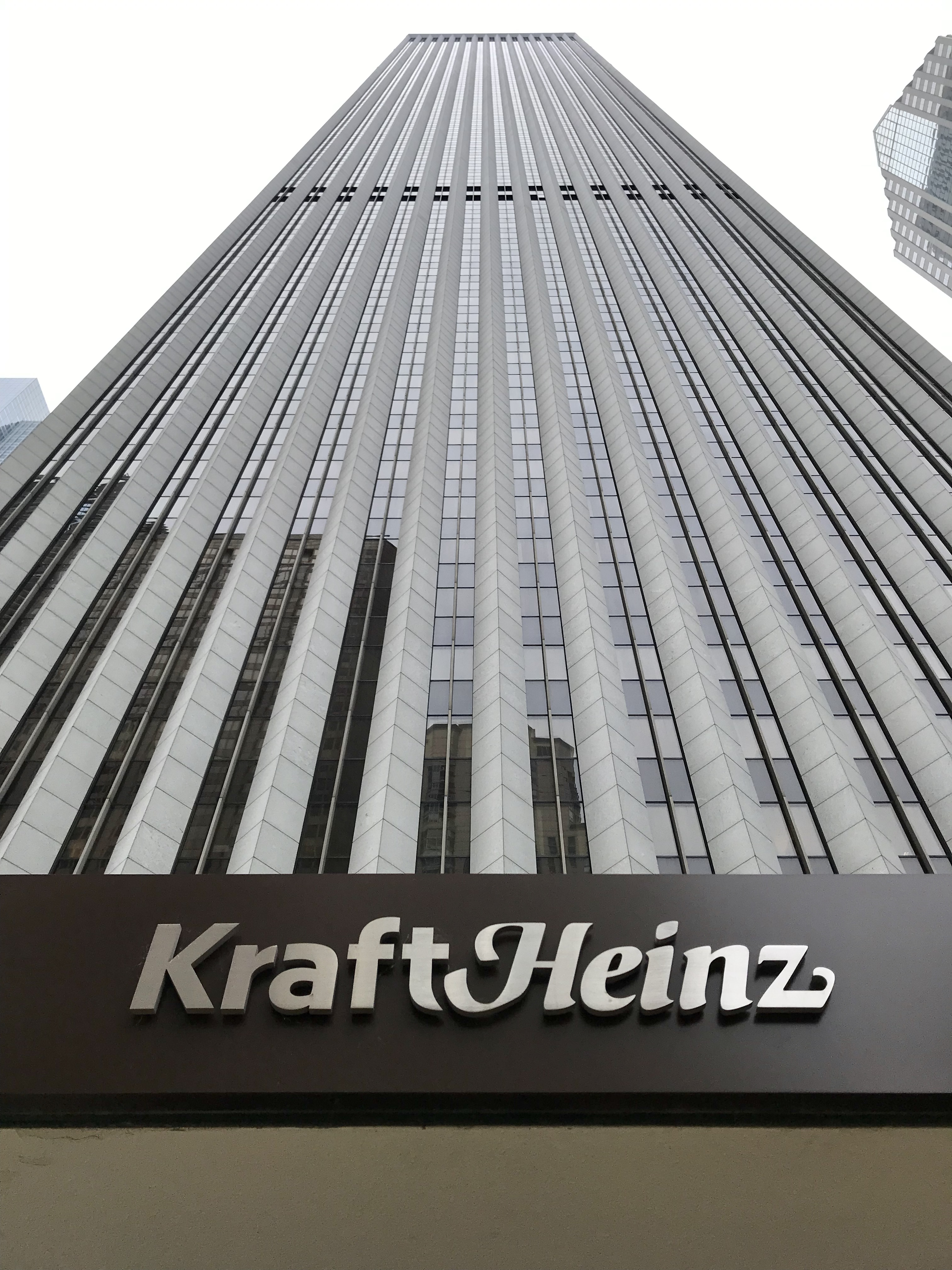
- Kraft Heinz co-headquarters at the Aon Center in the Chicago Loop
- Type: Public
- Traded as: NYSE: KHC; S&P 500 component
- Industry: Food
- Predecessor: H.J. Heinz Company; Kraft Foods Group
- Founded: July 2, 2015; 11 years ago
- Headquarters: Chicago, Illinois, and Pittsburgh, Pennsylvania, United States
- Area served: Worldwide
- Key people: John T. Cahill (chair); Steve Cahillane (CEO); Andre Maciel (CFO)
- Products: Beverages; Condiments; Convenience foods; Snack foods
- Revenue: ▼US$24.942 billion (2025)
- Operating income: ▼ −US$4.669 billion (2025)
- Net income: ▼ −US$5.848 billion (2025)
- Total assets: ▼US$81.786 billion (2025)
- Total equity: ▼US$41.664 billion (2025)
- Owners: Berkshire Hathaway (27.45%; as of January 16, 2026)
- Number of employees: c. 35,000 (2025)
- Website: kraftheinzcompany.com
- Footnotes; Financial figures are for the fiscal year ended December 27, 2025.

The Kraft Heinz Company, commonly known as Kraft Heinz, is an American multinational food company formed on July 2, 2015, through the merger of Kraft Foods Group and the H.J. Heinz Company. It is co-headquartered in Chicago and Pittsburgh and manufactures and markets packaged foods and beverages under brands including Kraft, Heinz, Oscar Mayer, Philadelphia, Lunchables, Velveeta, Maxwell House, and Jell-O. In fiscal 2025, the company reported net sales of US$24.9 billion and employed approximately 35,000 people in 40 countries.

Since the merger, Kraft Heinz has made an unsuccessful takeover approach for Unilever, recorded large brand write-downs, faced an accounting investigation by the U.S. Securities and Exchange Commission, and reshaped its portfolio through acquisitions and divestitures. In September 2025, the company announced a proposed separation into two publicly traded companies. Its board paused work on the separation in February 2026, and Kraft Heinz said in May 2026 that the timing and completion of the proposal remained uncertain.

== History ==
=== Formation and early years ===
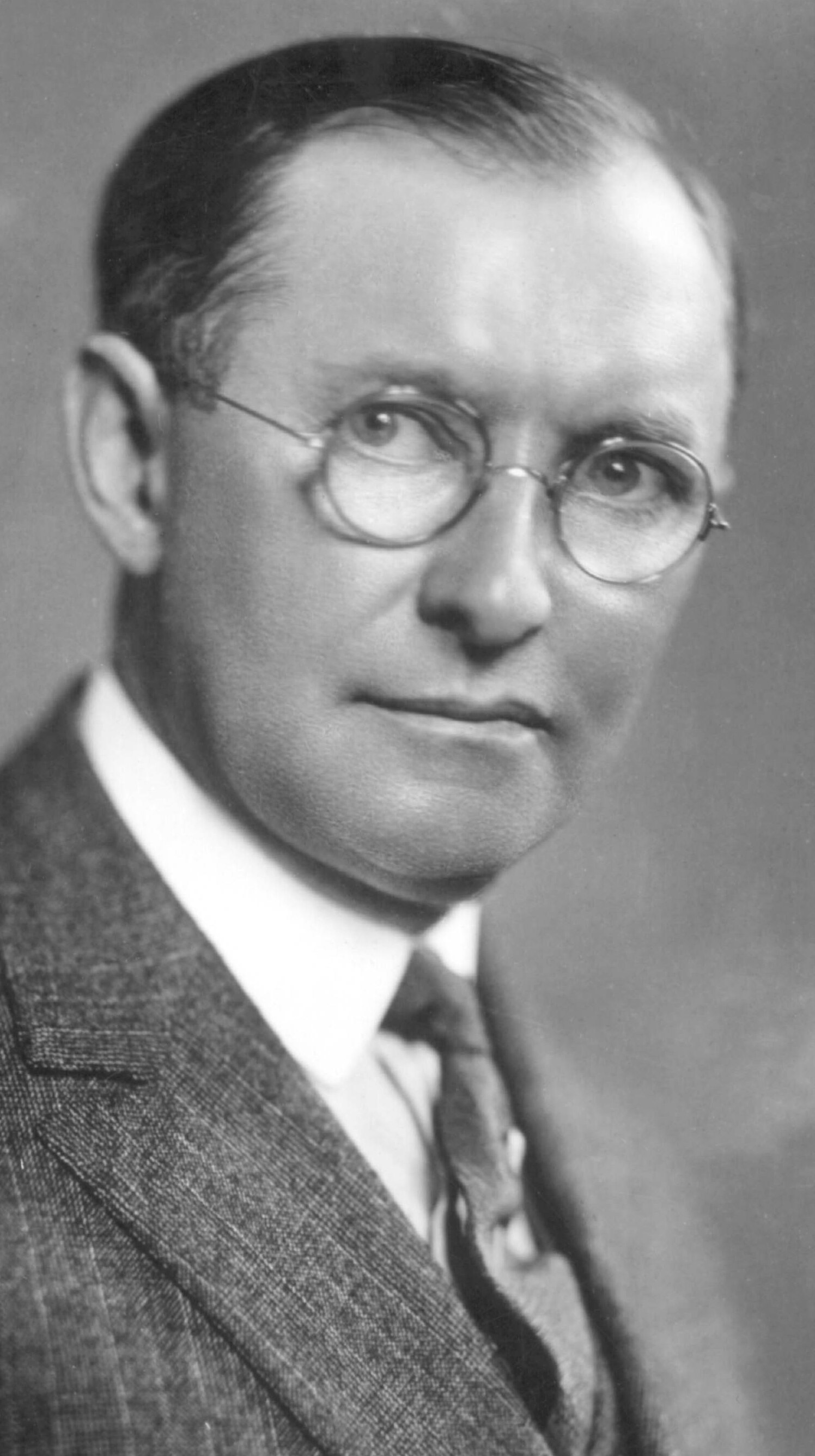
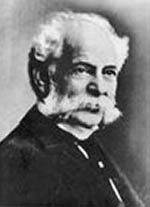
From left: James L. Kraft (1874–1953) and Henry J. Heinz (1844–1919), founders of the Kraft and Heinz businesses that preceded Kraft Heinz

Private equity firm 3G Capital and Berkshire Hathaway had jointly taken H. J. Heinz private in 2013. In January 2015, 3G Capital managing partner Alex Behring met with new Kraft CEO John Cahill to propose a merger between Kraft and Heinz. Cahill brought the idea to Kraft's board the following month.

In March 2015, the boards of Kraft Foods Group and H.J. Heinz agreed to merge, subject to shareholder and regulatory approval. Heinz Chief Executive Officer Bernardo Hees would lead the new company, with Alex Behring becoming Chairman and John Cahill Vice Chairman. The transaction was completed on July 2, 2015, creating the Kraft Heinz Company. At the time it was announced, the combined company was described as the world's fifth-largest food and beverage company.

In February 2017, Kraft Heinz made a $143 billion takeover approach for the British-Dutch consumer-goods company Unilever. Unilever rejected the proposal, and Kraft Heinz abandoned the approach two days later.

In October 2017, Mondelez sold most of its sauce business in Europe (Primarily Kraft-Branded Condiments and Bull's-Eye Barbecue Sauce in Germany) to Kraft Heinz as a result of Mondelez's licence to use the Kraft name expiring. As a result, Kraft Heinz again had the rights to use the Kraft trademark in Europe, excluding Mondelez's European Grocery Business and the ownership for Miracle Whip in Germany and Philadelphia Cream Cheese in Europe.

Kraft Heinz subsequently acquired Cerebos Pacific in March 2018 and Primal Kitchen in January 2019. The acquisitions cost $244 million and $201 million, respectively.

=== Accounting investigation ===
In February 2019, Kraft Heinz announced a $15.4 billion write-down of its Kraft and Oscar Mayer brands, cut its dividend, and disclosed that the U.S. Securities and Exchange Commission (SEC) had opened an investigation into its accounting practices the previous year. Ultimately, an internal investigation at Kraft Heinz found that years of accounting errors had caused it to understate its cost of goods sold by $208 million. More immediate, though, was the market reaction to this kitchen sink dump of bad news: the value of Kraft Heinz stock dropped $16 billion the morning following the announcement.

The destruction of so much shareholder value ensured an executive shakeup at Kraft Heinz. Anheuser-Busch InBev Chief Marketing Officer Miguel Patricio was announced as CEO Bernardo Hees' replacement on April 22, 2019. Originally slated to replace Hees in July, Patricio took over as chief executive on June 25, 2019. The departures of Chief Marketing officer Eduardo Luz and Eduardo Pelleissone, Kraft Heinz’s head of strategic projects, were also announced.

In 2021, the company agreed to pay $62 million to settle SEC charges related to the improper accounting practices. Additionally, Pelleissone and former chief procurement officer Klaus Hofmann paid sanctions of $300,000 and $100,000, respectively, for their roles in the scheme, with Hofmann further accepting the sanction that he would be barred from serving as an officer or director of a U.S.-listed public company for five years.

=== Portfolio changes ===
From 2020 through 2022, under the leadership of Miguel Patricio, Kraft Heinz attempted to reshape its business, selling off major assets and acquiring others.

In November 2020, Kraft Heinz announced the sale of a large part of its cheese business to the French company Lactalis for $3.2 billion. In a deal that included brands such as Breakstone's, Knudsen, Polly-O, Athenos, and Hoffman’s, Kraft Heinz sold its natural, grated, cultured and speciality cheese businesses in the United States, the Canadian grated cheese business, and the entirety of its worldwide cheese business outside Canada and the United States. The deal also included a perpetual license for Lactalis to continue to use the Kraft brand on several of these product categories, as well as the Velveeta brand both internationally and on shredded cheese. Several production facilities and a distribution center were also included in this price.

However, before the deal was completed in November 2021, the U.S. Justice Department required that Lactalis sell the Polly-O and Athenos brands to address monopoly concerns in the ricotta and feta cheese markets. The Polly-O brand was sold to BelGioioso Cheese, while Emmi Roth USA acquired Athenos.

While the deal to sell its cheese brands to Lactalis was still in process, Kraft Heinz struck a deal to sell its nuts business, including Planters, to Hormel for $3.35 billion in February 2021. The deal, which closed in June 2021, also included the Corn Nuts brand and the manufacturing plant in Fresno, California.

It also acquired Assan Foods, Hemmer, and a majority stake in the German spice company Just Spices.

Carlos Abrams-Rivera, who had served the head of Kraft Heinz's North American operations since December 2021, was announced as the new CEO in August 2023. He would replace Miguel Patricio as CEO on January 1, 2024.

In April 2024, it was disclosed that private equity firm 3G Capital had sold its 16.1% stake in Kraft Heinz.

=== Proposed separation ===
On September 2, 2025, Kraft Heinz announced a plan to separate into two independent, publicly traded companies through a spin-off intended to be tax-free. One proposed company would focus on sauces, spreads, seasonings, and shelf-stable meals, while the other would focus on certain North American grocery staples. The company said the final names of the proposed businesses had not been determined.

In December 2025, Kraft Heinz announced that Steve Cahillane would succeed Carlos Abrams-Rivera as chief executive and that John T. Cahill would become chair of the board, both effective January 1, 2026. On February 11, 2026, the board paused work on the separation. In its May 2026 quarterly report, Kraft Heinz said the timing and completion of the proposal remained uncertain.

== Brands ==
As of 2023, a partial list of global brands included in the Kraft Heinz portfolio:

Kraft and Heinz:

- Kraft Dinner
- Kraft Peanut Butter (Canada)
- Heinz Corned Beef (Africa and the Middle East)
- Heinz Ketchup

Other:

- A.1. Sauce
- ABC
- Amoy
- Aproten
- Baker's Chocolate
- Bénédicta
- Boca Burger
- Brinta
- Capri-Sun
- Cheez Whiz
- Classico
- Claussen pickles
- Cool Whip
- Crystal Light
- Daddies
- De Ruijter
- Greenseas
- Grey Poupon
- Golden Circle
- Hamper (Australia)
- Hemmer
- Honig
- HP Sauce
- Jell-O
- Karvan Cévitam
- Kool-Aid
- Lea & Perrins
- Lunchables
- Master Soy Sauce
- Maxwell House
- MiO
- Miracle Whip
- Mr. Yoshida's
- Nancy's
- Ore-Ida
  - Bagel Bites
- Original Juice Co.
- Orlando
- Oscar Mayer
- Ox & Palm (Australia)
- P3
- Philadelphia Cream Cheese
- Plasmon
- Primal Kitchen
- Pudliszki
- PurePet
- Quero
- Roosvicee
- Shake 'n Bake
- Smart Ones
- Stove Top
- Sure-Jeil
- Taco Bell At Home
- Tassimo
- TGI Fridays
- Velveeta
- Venz
- Wattie's
- Wijko
- Wyler's

== Finance ==
For the fiscal year 2017, Kraft Heinz reported earnings of US$11.0 billion, with annual revenue of US$26.2 billion, a decline of 0.6% over the previous fiscal cycle. Kraft Heinz's shares traded at over $61 per share, and its market capitalization was valued at over US$136 billion in September 2018.

In February 2019, shares in Kraft Heinz fell to a record low of under $35 after the company reported a $10.2bn loss for the previous year as the company announced that it would take a $15.4 billion writedown of its Kraft and Oscar Mayer brands, cut its dividend, and acknowledged that the U.S. Securities and Exchange Commission had opened a probe into its accounting practices. In August 2019, Kraft Heinz announced a further $1.22 billion in writedowns, as well as the return of its former CFO, Paulo Basilio, who held the position until 2017, to replace David Knopf, saying that it wanted a "seasoned veteran" following a series of accounting errors.

On February 21, 2019, Kraft Heinz reported that it received a Securities and Exchange Commission (SEC) subpoena in October that aimed to look into the company's accounting policies and internal controls. Kraft Heinz also announced that it cut its dividend from 62.5 cents a share to 40 cents. The company also announced a goodwill impairment charge that wrote down the value of the company's Kraft and Oscar Mayer brands of $15.4 billion in the fourth quarter, which resulted in a net loss of $12.61 billion. The all-resulting news made the company's stock crash more than 20% in after-hours trading. The stock plunge resulted in Berkshire Hathaway, the largest stockowner, recording a write down of $3 billion and a stock value loss of $4.3 billion just a day before Berkshire Hathaway's quarterly earnings and annual report to investors.

In September 2020, Kraft Heinz announced its new enterprise strategy, including plans to cut $2 billion in costs over five years, resulting in an estimated generation of 4% to 6% adjusted earnings per share growth. The announcement resulted in multiple stock upgrades by CFRA and Guggenheim due to the renewed positive financial outlook of the company.

In September 2021, Kraft Heinz was fined $62m to settle the U.S. Securities and Exchange Commission probe into an improper claim of $200m in cost savings. The $200 million in "bogus cost savings" (reportedly from merger) forced the company to restate its financial results for the years 2015 through 2018.

Year	Revenue in million US$	Net income in million US$	Price per Share in US$	Employees
2010	17,797	3,534		
2011	18,576	1,775		
2012	18,271	1,637		
2013	11,529	1,013		
2014	10,922	−63		
2015	18,338	−266	77.01	42,000
2016	26,487	3,452	81.91	41,000
2017	26,232	10,999	61.75	39,000
2018	26,300	−10,200		
2019	24,977	1,935		
2020	26,185	1,032	34.66	38,757
2021	26,040	1,020		
2022	26,485	2,368		
2023	26,640	2,855		36,000
2024	25,846	2,744		36,000

== Animal welfare ==
In 2017, Kraft Heinz committed to making a number of improvements to the welfare of broiler chickens in their supply chains by 2024. These included commitments to source chickens from high welfare breeds, provide birds with more space, and implement third-party monitoring.

In 2019, Kraft Heinz made an updated pledge to comply with the European Chicken Commitment, an animal welfare standard, for 100% of the chickens in its supply chain, by 2026.

In 2021, the BBFAW, an animal welfare monitoring organization, gave Kraft Heinz a rating that indicated it had established animal welfare practices but still has room to grow. At that time, according to Kraft Heinz, 70% of the chickens in the company's supply chain were cage-free or free-range.

== Controversies ==
In February 2016, an article appeared on Bloomberg highlighting the use of cellulose, a plant fiber derived from wood pulp, as an additive to grated Parmesan cheese. While normally added as an anti-caking agent, the article alleged that cellulose was instead being used as a filler, with the amounts added to some products — sometimes as high as 8% — far exceeding what was necessary to prevent caking. Kraft's grated Parmesan cheese contained 3.8% cellulose, which, while high, was within the 2-4% considered acceptable by the expert quoted in the article.

However, Kraft's labeling of their product at the time was "100% Grated Parmesan Cheese", and so Kraft was included as a defendant in some of the approximately 50 consumer protection lawsuits filed subsequent to Bloomberg's publishing of their report. These cases were consolidated into a single action before the United States District Court for the Northern District of Illinois in Chicago, which was subsequently dismissed by Judge Gary Feinerman in August 2017. Feinerman stated that a "reasonable consumer" would know the product could not be 100% cheese, as any unrefrigerated dairy product degrades quickly without additives. The cases were subsequently refiled, but Judge Feinerman dismissed the cases again in September 2018, although he allowed some claims to survive because the added cellulose, although labeled as an anti-caking additive, was in fact being used as filler. Judge Feinerman's dismissal would later be reversed on appeal in December 2020.

On December 1, 2023, a federal jury in Illinois awarded $17.8 million to several large food companies, including Kraft Heinz, in a lawsuit against Cal-Maine Foods, Inc. and others over allegations of egg price fixing. Cal-Maine Foods, contesting the verdict, insists on its innocence and the absence of wrongdoing in its business practices.

== See also ==
- List of food companies
- List of brand name food products
- List of dairy product companies in the United States
