= John T. Cahill (businessman) =

American businessman

- Born: 1958 or 1959 (age 66–67)
- Education: Harvard University
- Occupation: Vice Chair of Kraft Heinz

John T. Cahill (born 1958/59) is an American businessman.

== Biography ==
=== Early life ===
He graduated from Harvard University, and received an M.B.A. from the Harvard Business School.

=== Career ===
From 1979 to 1987, he worked for RKO General, including its subsidiary GenCorp. From 1987 to 1989, he was Chief Financial Officer of RKO Pictures.

He joined The Pepsi Bottling Group in 1989. He served as Chief Financial Officer from 1998 to 2000, President and Chief Operating Officer from 2000 to 2001, Chief Executive Officer from 2001 to 2003, Chairman and CEO from 2003 to 2006, and Executive Chairman from 2006 to 2007. He has been an industrial partner at the private equity firm Ripplewood Holdings since 2008. Since February 2009, he has served as Chairman of Hostess Brands. He became Executive Chairman of Kraft Foods Group, a subsidiary of Mondelēz International, in January 2012. He sits on the Board of Directors of Colgate-Palmolive, Mondelēz International and Legg Mason.

He served as Chairman of the American Beverage Association. He serves on the Boards of the U.S.-Russia Business Council, the Woodward/White Publishing Company, and the Industry Affairs Council of the Grocery Manufacturers of America. He is a member of G100, a private group of chief executives from the world's largest companies.

In December 2014 John Cahill was named CEO of Kraft foods.

In March 2015, it was announced that Kraft Foods would merge with Heinz to form Kraft Heinz. Cahill became vice chairman of the new merged company.
