= Primal Kitchen =

American food brand

- Founded: 2015
- Founder: Mark Sisson
- Headquarters: Oxnard, California, U.S.
- Products: Condiments, sauces, dips
- Parent: Kraft Foods

Primal Kitchen is an American food brand that specializes in ingredients, condiments and sauces. Their speciality is organic, more nutritious versions of specific condiments and ingredients which are naturally not as healthy. It was founded by Morgan Buehler and Mark Sisson in 2015 who began the brand on his blog. The company is located and headquartered in Oxnard, California. Kraft purchased the company in 2018 for $200 million. Beach and summer-fused marketing is the specialty the brand is known for in addition to their sauces.

== History ==
Mark Sission ran Mark's Daily Apple as a blog, and he and Morgan Buehler founded the company to specialize in healthier versions of foods that are not, and to create sauces and condiments.

In 2018, Kraft purchased Primal Nutrition, L.L.C. and the brand for $200 million and expected to generate $50 million in profits. Kraft Heinz president Paulo Basilio described the proposed partnership with Primal Kitchen as consistent with the company's vision of becoming "the best food company, growing a better world". He praised Primal Kitchen's portfolio of "health-enhancing, real-food pantry staples"..

In 2023, Ana Goettsch started a campaign in hopes for Generation Z customers and to reach out to the clientele by advertising at beaches for the summer. Later, they partnered with Mighty Quinn to create Mighty Quinn’s Hawaiian Ribs for a limited time.
