= Mindy Grossman =

American businesswoman

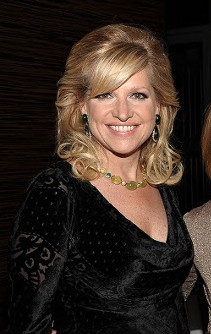
- Grossman in 2011
- Born: September 8, 1957 (age 69)
- Occupation: None
- Years active: 1977–present

Mindy Grossman (born September 8, 1957) is the former CEO of WW International (formerly Weight Watchers). Her earlier career included executive roles at Ralph Lauren Corporation and Nike, and she was also CEO of HSN from 2006 to 2017. She has been listed on Financial Times's list of the Top 50 Women In World Business, and was ranked among Forbes' 100 Most Powerful Women In The World, as well as in Fortune's Top People in Business.

== Early life and education ==
Mindy Grossman was born on September 8, 1957. Her adoptive parents were Donald and Elaine Waldman, a Jewish produce dealer and homemaker on Long Island, New York, who had married young but had been unable to have children.

She attended Manhattanville College in Westchester County, New York, and transferred to George Washington University in Washington, D.C. She intended to go to law school after graduation. However, in her senior year at George Washington University, she broke off her engagement to her high-school boyfriend and dropped her plans to attend law school, and instead moved to New York City to go into the fashion industry.

== Career ==
=== 1977–1991 ===
Grossman moved to New York City in 1977, and was offered a job working for menswear conglomerate Manhattan International, as an assistant to the president of their international division. From 1978 to 1980, she was an account executive at Jeffrey Banks menswear. From 1980 to 1981, she was an account executive at Ron Chereskin menswear. From 1981 to 1985, she was a regional sales manager at Merona, and then vice-president of sales at Jeffrey Banks; both Merona and Jeffrey Banks were at the time divisions of Oxford Industries.

From 1985 to 1988, Grossman worked for WilliWear by Willi Smith. She started out as Vice President of Sales and in 1987 became Vice President of Menswear.

From 1988 to 1991 she was Vice President of Sales and Merchandising at Tommy Hilfiger, which had been incorporated in 1985. Grossman later recalled, "At the time, it was a small company, and sales were meteoric. They went from around $38 million to $350 million."

=== 1991–2006 ===
==== Ralph Lauren ====
From 1991 to 2000, Grossman worked for brands by Ralph Lauren. From 1991 to 1994, she was President of Chaps Ralph Lauren, a division of Warnaco, Inc., and she was also Senior Vice President of Menswear for Warnaco, Inc. Chaps was Ralph Lauren's midprice department-store brand; She grew the Chaps division's annual revenues from $26 million to $250 million.

She was vice-president of New Business Development at Polo Ralph Lauren Corporation from 1994 to 1995. During that period, she developed new brand concepts, including Polo Jeans. She convinced Lauren that in order to attract customers at a younger age he needed to embrace new ideas, and that Polo Jeans Company was a good way to make lifelong customers out of a younger audience. Grossman calls starting Polo Jeans "my start-up experience"; she was its president and CEO from 1995 to 2000, launched the brand in 1996, and took it from a standing start to a $450 million business, building it into the leading department store status denim brand.

==== Nike ====
In 2000, Grossman joined Nike, Inc., where she served as Vice President of Global Apparel from 2000 to 2006, overseeing its worldwide multi-billion-dollar apparel business. Nike CEO Phil Knight had brought her in to revive Nike's sagging apparel business, capitalizing on her expertise in fashion, brand strategy, product development, and retail space management.

In her capacity as head of global apparel, she oversaw global strategic planning; product development; and global apparel manufacturing, operations, sourcing, merchandising, advanced innovation, quality assurance, and compliance and sustainability. She was also responsible for Nike's women's business. She reengineered the entire apparel organization, and created three sub-brands for Nike apparel: Nike Performance, targeted to athletes and aspirational consumers; Nike Active, a line to be worn from gym to street; and Nike Fusion, apparel with higher-performance fabrics and aggressive styling. Under her leadership, Nike also rolled out new NikeWomen stores, launched NikeWomen catalogues, and started a new division called Fitness Dance. She advanced Nike's apparel innovation agenda, led the development and growth of the global women's business, and created and co-chaired Nike's Global Women's Leadership Council.

Grossman was credited with showing a footwear company how to be an apparel company. She brought her strong fashion background to Nike's apparel and regenerated it, devoting much of her energy to the company's weaker women's wear business. Nike's apparel business's annual revenue was $2.7 billion when she joined in 2000; by the end of fiscal year 2005 she had grown it to $4.1 billion, which was 32% of Nike brand revenues.

=== 2006 to 2017: HSN ===
==== Arrival at HSN ====
By 2006, a recruiter approached Grossman about IAC/InterActiveCorp (IAC), the parent company of HSN, Inc., and after studying HSN's broadcasts she realized that, in her words, "HSN really needed to become more of a lifestyle network that would inspire people through products". Her vision was to offer inspiring lifestyle programming, particularly with charismatic celebrities, with all the products for sale – rather than the usual dry and old-fashioned standard sales format.

She took the idea to Barry Diller, the head of IAC, and even though she had no television experience, no direct-to-consumer experience, and no experience in most of the product categories HSN sold, he hired her. In April 2006, Grossman was appointed CEO of IAC Retailing, overseeing HSN, the catalog company Cornerstone Brands, Shoebuy.com, and IAC's international retailing operations.

HSN had had seven CEOs in the previous 10 years, and according to Grossman the company, offices, and employees seemed downtrodden and frozen in time. One of her first actions was to throw out all the old, broken, or dirty office furniture and give all employees Aeron chairs. In order to focus on revitalizing HSN, she closed IAC's failing UK auction business, sold its German shopping channel, closed the down-market DirecTV clearance-shopping channel America's Store, and put another executive in charge of Cornerstone brands. She also eliminated negative or "toxic" employees, sought out committed, knowledgeable people within and outside the company to head up important divisions, and ensured that all employees were on board with the company's new vision.

She also found that the network and brand itself was a "very stagnant, linear, non-immersive experience". By October 2006 she rolled out HSN's new brand image, tagline, vision statement, customer intention, and advertising. The company's new manifesto was "to create a new lifestyle experience for consumers". To implement the plan, she stopped selling $150 million worth of unsuitable brands, and worked hard to entice higher-end brands, and new personalities to sell products. Among many others, early on she recruited Sephora, Emeril Lagasse, and Todd English to sell on air. She also aired a two-hour fashion show of high-end apparel. In addition, she brought the company's call centers back to the U.S. from overseas.

==== HSN relaunch and taking the company public ====
By mid 2007 the relaunch and redesign of HSN's channel, website, and campus were in effect, and the business started to turn around. In November of that year, Diller decided to break up IAC into several of its constituent companies, and to spin off HSN, Inc. as a public company via an IPO with Grossman as CEO. The IPO launched in August 2008. A few weeks later the Lehman Brothers collapse occurred, with the subsequent stock-market plunge and recession. Grossman kept HSN afloat and thriving during the tenuous recessional years of 2008 and 2009 via intense economies and stringent dedication to her vision, and by tailoring HSN's marketing to her customers' needs to economize.

She continued to aggressively transform, redefine, and reinvent the HSN brand, improving its demographics and increasing the value of its stock from $10 at its IPO in August 2008 to $55 a share in 2014. HSN's success fostered the launch of a second 24-hour television channel, HSN2, in 2010. Grossman's upgraded the product level to high-end products; implemented numerous digital and mobile access options; improved the shopping experience; and brought on celebrities and high-end fashion designers to sell their lines.

HSN improved as a multi-platform business, with an improved shopping experience. Forbes and Fortune termed the new brand a "hybrid" – a media, entertainment, technology, and retail business.

To stay current with technology, Grossman introduced new HSN venues including Shop by Remote (television remote control shopping), HSN Arcade (online games), Video on Demand, HSN Live, shopping via YouTube, and in-flight shopping. She overhauled HSN's website and made HSN a major e-commerce presence; as of 2013 HSN.com was one of the top 10 most-trafficked e-commerce sites. She evolved HSN from a linear network to a multi-platform business, so that nearly half the HSN's revenue came through digital platforms.

She recruited major celebrities such as Jennifer Lopez, Queen Latifah, Mariah Carey, Iman, P. Diddy, Padma Lakshmi, Martha Stewart, Jessica Simpson, Keith Urban, Nicki Minaj, Mary J. Blige, and Serena Williams, and major cosmetics companies such as Lancôme and Stila, to appear on the network and sell their own brands of merchandise, most of them exclusively created for HSN. She brought in high-end fashion designers to sell exclusive fashion lines on the network, garnering Grossman and HSN a front row at Fashion Week. She also created partnerships with major companies like Disney and other Hollywood studios to sell merchandise, invited movie and television-series tie-ins, and aired live concerts by singers such as Rod Stewart and Randy Travis.

HSN became a Fortune 1000 company in 2009. As of 2014, Grossman was one of only 51 women who lead a Fortune 1000 company. In 2015, Fortune published an article stating that from 2002 through 2014, Fortune 1000 companies led by women have performed three times better than the S&P 500, and that HSN's returns since its IPO were one of the top two, even despite the stock-market meltdown which immediately followed its initial public offering. Grossman was the recruited by other retailers, including Penney's, Target, and Avon.

=== 2017 to present: WW ===
==== Arrival at WW ====
On April 26, 2017, Weight Watchers (now WW) announced that Mindy Grossman would take over as CEO in July 2017, replacing former CEO James Chambers who resigned from the company in the fall of 2016. Once in office, she said that her plan included a push beyond dieting and into well-being, as well as a partnership with Oprah Winfrey, who holds almost 15% of WW's shares and sits on its board of directors. She resigned her position early in 2022.

== Directorships and advisories ==
Grossman has been a director of HSN, Inc. since it went public in August 2008. She has been a director of Bloomin’ Brands since 2012. She serves on the Board of Directors of, and as of 2015 is Vice Chair of, the National Retail Federation. She also serves on the Board of Directors of, and as of 2015 is Chair of, the National Retail Federation Foundation, the charitable arm of the National Retail Federation.

She is the chair of the advisory board of Fashion Institute of Technology’s Executive Women in Fashion. She is a member of the Industry Advisory Board of the Jay H. Baker Retailing Center at the Wharton School of Business. She is also an advisor at the venture capital firm Metamorphic Ventures.

Grossman is on the Board of Directors of the United States Fund for UNICEF. She also founded and spearheads HSN Cares, the philanthropic arm of HSN.

In June 2017, Grossman joined the Board of Directors of sports apparel e-commerce retailer Fanatics.

== Awards and honors ==
- Forbes' 100 Most Powerful Women (2009)
- Financial Times' Top 50 women in world business (2010)
- Financial Times' Top 50 women in world business (2011)
- Forbes' World's 100 most powerful women (2011)
- Fast Company's Top 100 Most Creative People in Business (2011)
- Woman of Achievement Award from the Women's Project Theater (2011)
- Corporate Innovator of the Year at the Ernst & Young Entrepreneur of the Year Florida Awards (2011)
- Business Insider's 50 Sexiest CEOs Alive (2012)
- Forbes' World's 100 most powerful women (2012)
- Forbes' World's 100 most powerful women (2013)
- Matrix Award (2013)
- Fortune's Top People in Business #22 (2014)

== Personal life ==
Mindy is married to Neil D. Grossman, an investment manager and investment analyst and the creator of Bloomberg's Neilytics. They have one child.
