= WW International =

American health and weight loss firm

WW International, Inc.
- Formerly: Weight Watchers (1963–2018)
- Type: Public
- Traded as: OTCID Basic: WGHTQ; Nasdaq: WW
- Founded: May 15, 1963; 63 years ago Queens, New York, U.S.
- Headquarters: 675 Avenue of the Americas, 6th Floor New York, NY 10010
- Key people: Tara Comonte, President & CEO
- Products: Weight loss, Packaged foods, Exercise products
- Revenue: ▲$1.5 billion (2018)
- Operating income: ▲$267.305 million (2017)
- Net income: ▲$163.514 million (2017)
- Total assets: ▼1.246 billion (2017)
- Total equity: ▲ -1.015 billion (2017)
- Number of employees: 18,000 (as of 2017)
- Website: weightwatchers.com

WW International, Inc., formerly Weight Watchers International, Inc., is a global company headquartered in the U.S. that offers weight loss and maintenance, fitness, and mindset services such as the Weight Watchers comprehensive diet program. Founded in 1963 by Queens, New York City homemaker Jean Nidetch, WW's program has three options as of 2019: online via its mobile app and website, coaching online or by phone, or in-person meetings.

In 2018, the company rebranded to "WW" to reflect "its development from focusing on weight loss to overall health and wellness."

== Company history ==
=== Inception ===
Weight Watchers was conceived by Jean Nidetch, a housewife and mother living in Queens, New York City, who had been overweight most of her life and had tried pills, hypnosis, and numerous fad diets, all of which only led to regained weight. In 1961, at the age of 38, she weighed 214 pounds and an acquaintance mistook her for being pregnant. She entered a free 10-week weight-loss program sponsored by the New York City Board of Health's obesity clinic. The program was called the "Prudent Diet" and had been developed in the 1950s by Dr. Norman Jolliffe, head of the board's Bureau of Nutrition. The plan included the dictums "No skipping meals. Fish five times a week. Two pieces of bread and two glasses of skim milk a day. More fruits and vegetables." and eating liver once a week. It prohibited alcohol, sweets, and fatty foods, included a list of allowed foods and the quantities allowed, and encouraged weighing portions.

Although Nidetch lost 20 pounds on the ten-week program, she did not like the way the clinic's leader imparted information at the weekly meetings. Discussion was discouraged; in addition, Nidetch's motivation was threatened by her urge to binge on Mallomar cookies. She therefore began a weekly support group in her apartment, initially inviting six overweight friends, which within two months grew to 40 women each week. She introduced the "Prudent Diet", a single page from the New York City Board of Health, to her fellow weight-loss seekers, and the group provided empathy, rapport, mutual understanding, support, and sharing of stories and ideas. The meetings also included a weekly weigh-in, and Nidetch developed a rewards system including prizes for weight-loss milestones. In October 1962, Nidetch achieved her target weight of 142 pounds, and maintained the weight loss; according to her she never exceeded 150 pounds thereafter.

As interest grew, Nidetch coached groups in other neighborhoods. One group was at the home of Al and Felice Lippert, and after the Lipperts successfully lost weight, Al, who was a businessman in the garment industry, talked Nidetch into making a business out of her endeavor.

=== Launch, IPO, and sale to Heinz ===
Nidetch and the Lipperts launched Weight Watchers Inc. in Queens in 1963 with Nidetch as president and evangelist. They rented public meeting venues and charged participants $2 per weekly meeting; the first official meeting, in May 1963, attracted 400 attendees. Nidetch led groups and trained others to lead groups as well.

Al Lippert, in charge of the business end of the company, franchised it in 1964, using a razor/razorblade model of an inexpensive franchise fee offered to graduates from the company's programs who had kept the weight off, with 10% of gross earnings as royalties to the parent company. By 1967, the company was international, with 102 franchises in the United States, Canada, Puerto Rico, Great Britain, and Israel.

Felice Lippert was in charge of recipe development, nutrition, and food research; the first Weight Watchers cookbook, published in 1966, sold more than 1.5 million copies. By January 1968, the company had more than one million members worldwide, and, with the help of Matty Simmons' and Leonard Mogel's Twenty First Century Communications, Inc., Weight Watchers Magazine was launched, publishing 300,000 copies of its first issue.

By 1968, the company had 91 franchises in 43 states, and to expand further overseas Al Lippert took the company public as Weight Watchers International Inc.; the initial 225,000 shares, offered at $11.25 a share, began trading enthusiastically, rising to over $30 by the end of the first day. Lippert also initiated lines of Weight Watchers prepared food, spas, camps for overweight kids, and weight-loss products such as scales and travel kits.

Nidetch, with her slim, well-dressed image, charisma, and flair for motivational speaking, remained the public face of the company. In 1970 she published The Memoir of a Successful Loser: The Story of Weight Watchers, which documented the original Weight Watchers plan. In 1973 she resigned as president of the company to devote herself to public relations – traveling, being interviewed, and speaking to large audiences about the program's success.

In the mid-1970s, the company moved away from simply dieting and more toward "eating management", developing tailored options to meet the varying needs of its members, including a specialized food plan for the management of weight-loss plateaus, and a maintenance plan.

In 1975, the publication of Weight Watchers magazine was taken over by Family Media (the publishers of Family Health magazine).

By the late 1970s, the company and its operations and divisions had grown too large and complex for Lippert to manage, and it was sold, along with its food licensees, to the H. J. Heinz Company in 1978 for $72 million. Lippert remained chairman and signed on to remain CEO for a few years, and Nidetch remained in her role as consultant. In the late 1980s, the company's three divisions – support-group meetings division, food line, and publications and media – were still increasingly profitable year-over-year.

=== Private-equity acquisition and second IPO ===
In 1990, with competition from Jenny Craig, Slim-Fast, Healthy Choice, and Nutrisystem, earnings began to decline. The Heinz parent company competed by introducing newly developed Weight Watchers "Smart Ones" frozen meals. In 1997, to replace its previous system of counting and weighing food, Weight Watchers introduced the POINTS system, an algorithmic formula which quantifies a food portion for the purposes of healthy weight loss based on carbohydrates, fat, and fiber content.

In 1999, Heinz, while retaining the rights to the Weight Watchers name for use in certain food categories, sold the company to the private equity firm Artal Luxembourg, for $735 million in a leveraged buyout led by the Invus Group, which manages Artal and which is run by Raymond Debbane. Artal put up $224 million and Weight Watchers financed the rest of the buyout with debt. Debbane became chairman of Weight Watchers. In 2001 Debbane organized an initial public offering for Weight Watchers and took it public again. As of 2018, Artal remains the company's largest shareholder.

In 2000, the new owners reacquired the license to publish Weight Watchers Magazine from Time Inc., where Heinz had offloaded it in 1996 and where it had performed poorly; circulation recovered quickly, and the magazine was redesigned in 2003.

In 2001, the company launched WeightWatchers.com. In 2007, it launched Weight Watchers Online for Men. Competitor Nutrisystem, Inc. also had a men's line.

In late 2010 Weight Watchers overhauled its POINTS system and replaced it with PointsPlus (ProPoints outside the U.S.); under the new system, fruits and non-starchy vegetables were zero points, and processed foods had higher points than they did before.

From 2012 to 2015, although it had its own app and e-tools since 2009, the company faced stiff competition from free smartphone fitness apps, many of which included a social-media group-support system, and from wearable fitness monitors such as Fitbit.

=== 2014–2018 ===
In April of 2014, Tech Crunch leaked Weight Watchers was in talks to acquire virtual fitness training startup Wello. Weight Watchers confirmed the acquisition the following month, which spurred a series of acquisitions in the digital therapeutics space. One year later, in April and May of 2015, Weight Watchers also acquired 5 minute fitness app Hot 5 and the online community and "selfie startup" Weilos. Features of Weilos would later be relaunched as Weight Watcher's Connect product, an online community in-app and on the web.

In October 2015, Oprah Winfrey partnered with Weight Watchers. Winfrey bought a 10% stake in the company, became its spokesperson, joined its board of directors, and lost weight on the program, plus she helped launch a new holistic lifestyle and fitness program called "Beyond the Scale". The late-2015 Oprah effect did not prevent a subsequent downward trend in 2016, largely attributed to challenges from Nutrisystem and the proliferation of free apps and websites aimed at helping people manage their weight, but linked also by some, to a faulty initial tech rollout of the new program's app. CEO James Chambers resigned on September 30, 2016. He was replaced as CEO in July 2017 by Mindy Grossman, who had played a role in growing digital sales revenue for HSN.

In December 2017, the company introduced WW Freestyle (called WW Flex outside the U.S.), which allows people to carry over unused "SmartPoints" through the week, and lists more than 200 zero-points foods, including various lean proteins, that do not need to be tracked. In February 2018 CEO Grossman announced a new direction and purpose for the company: to move beyond mere dieting to being a "partner in health and wellness" and inspiring healthy habits for real life. Subscriptions to Weight Watchers rebounded significantly by mid 2018, credited to Winfrey's influence and to Grossman's tri-fold efforts of revamping the program, improving tech offerings, and giving the company a more broad-based appeal.

In August 2018, the company acquired Kurbo, Inc, rebranding the free mobile app directed at children and teenagers as Kurbo by WW.

In September 2018, the company re-branded itself WW International, Inc., as it shifted its focus more broadly to overall health and wellness, including fitness. It adopted a new tagline, "Wellness that Works". The company stopped requiring users to have a weight loss goal in order to join and renamed its in-person meetings to Wellness Workshops. WW's app was relaunched with features to track other health-related goals. Its FitPoints system has been marketed as allowing individuals to choose activities which have the biggest impact on their health. At that time the company also began a partnership with the meditation app Headspace to offer customized mindfulness content for members.

As part of the rebrand, WW introduced a new program, WellnessWins, that rewarded members for behaviors that encourage healthier habits, which were redeemable for products, services, and experiences. The company also announced Connect, a digital community, which would include micro-community Groups.

=== Decline and bankruptcy ===
On April 9, 2025, it was reported that WW was preparing to file for Chapter 11 bankruptcy protection within the coming months, blaming financial challenges and increased competition from weight loss drugs such as Ozempic. The company planned to eliminate most of its debt and sell itself to creditors.

On May 6, 2025, WW filed for Chapter 11 bankruptcy in Delaware, with plans to eliminate most of its $1.5 billion debt in an effort to put itself in a better financial position. The company expected to emerge from bankruptcy within no more than 40 days, or around June 15, 2025, with operations expected to be running normally throughout the procedure. WW was delisted from Nasdaq on May 16, and commenced trading over-the-counter. In early July 2025, WW emerged from bankruptcy and was relisted on the NASDAQ.

== Business model ==
Weight Watchers' business model is one of a subscription-based program of support, plus a variety of purchasable products, media, services, and technologies. Its brand identity has been framed around Weight Watchers being a community, and its website is intrinsic to its effectiveness. Particularly in the 21st century, the company has increasingly marketed itself as a health and wellness brand rather than a weight-loss brand, and its dietary plans emphasize fruits, vegetables, lean proteins, and foods high in whole grains and low in trans fats. Also in the 21st century, the company has increasingly tried to effectively and competitively balance its digital and offline offerings. As of 2019, the program offered weight-loss support via the app and website, in-person workshops and personal coaching.

=== Products and services ===
Weight Watchers' primary sources of income are subscriptions to the program.

The company provides a weight-management program (myWW+) and a food plan (SmartPoints); customers can participate in the program via in-person group meetings and/or digitally, and are provided with individualized information, support, and coaching.

It also receives income from Weight Watchers–branded services and products, which include publications such as Weight Watchers magazines, Weight Watchers cookbooks, and food guides and restaurant guides with points values. It sells its own bars and snacks, and licenses the Weight Watchers trademark to a variety of prepared foods, beverages, and other products and services.

=== Weight-loss plans and formats ===
The original Weight Watchers dietary plan in the 1960s was roughly based on the "Prudent Diet", developed by Dr. Norman Jolliffe at the New York City Board of Health. It was based around lean meat, fish, skim milk, and fruits and vegetables, and it banned alcohol, sweets, and fatty foods. It had lists of allowed and prohibited foods, and was more structured than subsequent versions of the Weight Watchers program. It recommended weighing food portions, and prohibited skipping meals or counting calories.

The company has regularly changed and updated its diet plans and formats, to reflect current nutritional and obesity science and to accommodate consumer awareness and demand.

- In 1979 Weight Watchers introduced PepStep (or Personal Exercise Plan), a walking or stair-climbing exercise program to benefit members' weight loss, developed by a doctor specializing in exercise and cardiac rehabilitation. With this additional element Weight Watchers became one of the first weight-loss companies, along with the Pritikin program, to promote the importance of regular exercise.
- By 1980, the company expanded its dietary plan to allow for substitutions and more flexibility. It introduced three routines: a "full choice" plan with the most options; a "limited choice" plan with fewer options and less leeway; and a "no choice" plan with no substitutions and no options, which was the most calorie-restrictive and was to be followed for no more than two weeks.
- In 1984 the company added Quick Start, which was a more spartan, temporary eating plan designed to produce faster, motivation-boosting weight loss in the first few weeks of the program. It was the company's first exchange-based diet, where foods within categories could be exchanged for each other. This was expanded in 1986 to Quick Start Plus, with higher-fat options and Personal Choice options.
- In 1984 Weight Watchers also launched its At Work program, held for groups of 15 or more in office places, for people who were otherwise unable to attend community meetings. The meetings are held either before work, during the lunch break, or after work, and the fees are usually subsidized by the employer.
- In 1988, Weight Watchers launched the Quick Success program, a plan that was easier and more flexible, particularly for working women. It also allowed for a lacto-ovo-vegetarian diet, and increased the minimum daily vegetable intake from two to three.
- In 1997 Weight Watchers completely replaced its exchange-based diets with the POINTS system (also originally called 1-2-3 Success), a proprietary algorithmic formula which quantifies a food portion for the purposes of healthy weight loss based on carbohydrates, fat, and fiber content.
- In 2000 the company rolled out Winning Points, a more personalized version of the POINTS system, which encompassed self-observation, behavior modification, and fitness and activity, and which did not have any food exclusions.
- In 2004, Weight Watchers launched the Turn Around program, which gave people two plans to choose from, and aimed to teach participants how to eat normal food, in sensible portions, and to increase their exercise. The Flex Plan option allowed dieters to eat anything they wanted as long as they stayed within their points allowance; activity points could be earned by exercise. The Core Plan option (later known as "Simply Filling") dispensed with points entirely and included a list of foods that could be eaten "until satisfied", and a list of foods to be avoided.
- In December 2008, Weight Watchers eliminated the Core Plan and introduced the Momentum Plan, designed to help members understand how consuming certain filling foods helped them to eat less and prevent overeating.
- In late 2010 Weight Watchers overhauled its POINTS system and replaced it with PointsPlus (ProPoints outside the U.S.); under the new system, fruits and non-starchy vegetables are zero points, and processed foods have higher points than they did before.
- In December 2012 the company rolled out Weight Watchers 360, which did not change its PointsPlus plan but added behavioral modification and support, mindfulness, control of and planning for one's eating environment, and new apps, and also added an optional wearable fitness monitor to purchase called ActiveLink.
- In September 2014, Weight Watchers began syncing its apps with wearable fitness monitors such as Fitbit and Jawbone, so that the activity of members who own those devices is instantly uploaded and tracked and converted to points.
- In December 2014, Weight Watchers launched two new services: Personal Coaching and 24/7 Expert Chat. Personal Coaching provides individuals with a Weight Watchers-certified coach who helps them develop an individualized weight management plan and is available via phone, text, and email for subsequent consultations. 24/7 Expert Chat allows members all-hours access to Weight Watchers-certified coaches who can offer instant advice when users encounter weight-loss or dieting crises.
- In December 2015 the company rolled out a new holistic lifestyle and fitness program called "Beyond the Scale". The program uses SmartPoints, an updating of the points system which takes into consideration the nutritional value of a food, and helps steer people away from junk foods, sugar, and saturated fat. That same month, the company launched Connect, a social-media platform via its app where members receive support from other members.
- In December 2017, Weight Watchers introduced WW Freestyle (called WW Flex outside the U.S.), which allows people to carry over unused points through the week, and lists more than 200 zero-points foods, including various lean proteins, that do not need to be tracked.
- In November 2021, WW introduced a new program called PersonalPoints which now uses AI to adjust your points and zero-point food list based on individual preferences. In addition, extra points can now be earned for drinking at least 60 fl oz of water daily and for every cup of non-starchy vegetables.

== Reception ==
As of July 2018, Weight Watchers was the most widely used commercial diet in the world. In addition to the U.S., as of 2018 it had operations in countries including Canada, the UK, Germany, Switzerland, France, Belgium, the Netherlands, Sweden, Australia, New Zealand, and Brazil. Its main long-term competitors in the commercial weight-loss company genre are Jenny Craig and Nutrisystem. Weight Watchers has been included in U.S. News & World Report's rankings for 40 most popular diets and has also been listed as No.1 for weight loss and best commercial diets.

For Weight Watchers customers who choose to attend meetings, in addition to supplying information and lifestyle tips, meetings operate as support groups that provide empathy, rapport, and mutual understanding, as well as positive reinforcement.

Some therapists have said that focusing on counting calories or points, as promoted by WW, can lead to a disordered relationship with food and hunger. Previously the company's prepared foods had been criticized as containing preservatives and other additives; as of late 2018 Weight Watchers has removed all artificial sweeteners, flavors, colors, and preservatives from products carrying the company's name, and dropped or reformulated most of the food products it once produced.

In August 2019, WW released Kurbo by WW, a weight management and health app directed at children and teenagers. It has been criticized by some experts on nutrition and eating disorders for encouraging dieting in children as young as 8. Christy Harrison, a registered dietician, wrote in the New York Times, "programs like this are fertile ground for disordered eating" and that efforts to lose weight "are especially troubling when imposed on children who aren't in a position to make their own choices and who haven't had the opportunity to develop a peaceful relationship with food and their bodies." However, an article in the journal Childhood Obesity concluded that it could be "part of the piece of the puzzle to improving health in youth", despite the authors' concerns with the marketing of the app emphasizing weight loss. An uncontrolled three-month study of the app used by children between 8 and 17 said that it was "highly effective" based on an average reduction in zBMI of 0.26, and a survey of weight management apps published in JMIR mHealth and uHealth noted that of their list, only Kurbo involved health care professionals in its development.

As a result of the release of Kurbo by WW, WW's corporate headquarters in New York City were protested on September 13, 2019, and as of September 2019 a change.org petition asking Weight Watchers to "remove your weight loss app for kids" had over 110,000 signatures.

== Leadership and spokespersons ==
=== Corporate governance ===
Weight Watchers' founder Jean Nidetch was the company's President from 1963–1973.

Al Lippert was CEO of Weight Watchers from 1963–1981. From 1978–1999, Weight Watchers was a subsidiary of Heinz. Charles M. Berger was CEO of Weight Watchers from 1982–1994, having previously been its President. Since 1999, the CEOs of Weight Watchers have been: Linda Huett 2000–2006; David Kirchhoff 2007–2013; Jim Chambers 2013–2016; and Mindy Grossman 2017–2022.

Grossman also serves as President and on the board of directors. Since 1999, the chairman of the company has been Raymond Debbane, co-founder and CEO of The Invus Group.

In 2015, Oprah Winfrey purchased a 10 percent ownership stake in WW International and served as a member of the board of directors. In February 2024, she announced that she was leaving WW and would be donating her shares of stock to the National Museum of African American History and Culture.

=== Spokespersons ===
Founder Jean Nidetch was the company's public face and spokesperson from its launch in 1963 through 1983. Subsequent spokespersons have included: Lynn Redgrave (1983–1992), Kathleen Sullivan (1994–1995), Sarah, Duchess of York (1997–2007), Greg Grunberg (2007), Tamela Mann (2008–present), Jenny McCarthy (2009), Jennifer Hudson (2010–2014), Charles Barkley (2011–2014), Jessica Simpson (2012–2014), Ana Gasteyer (2013), Oprah Winfrey (2015–2024), DJ Khaled (2018–present), Kate Hudson (2018–present), Kevin Smith (2018–present), and James Corden (2021–2023).

== See also ==
- List of diets
