= Stouffer's =

Brand of frozen prepared foods

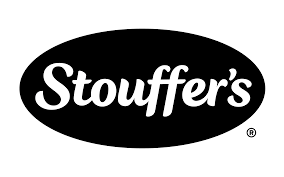
- Logo used since July 2024

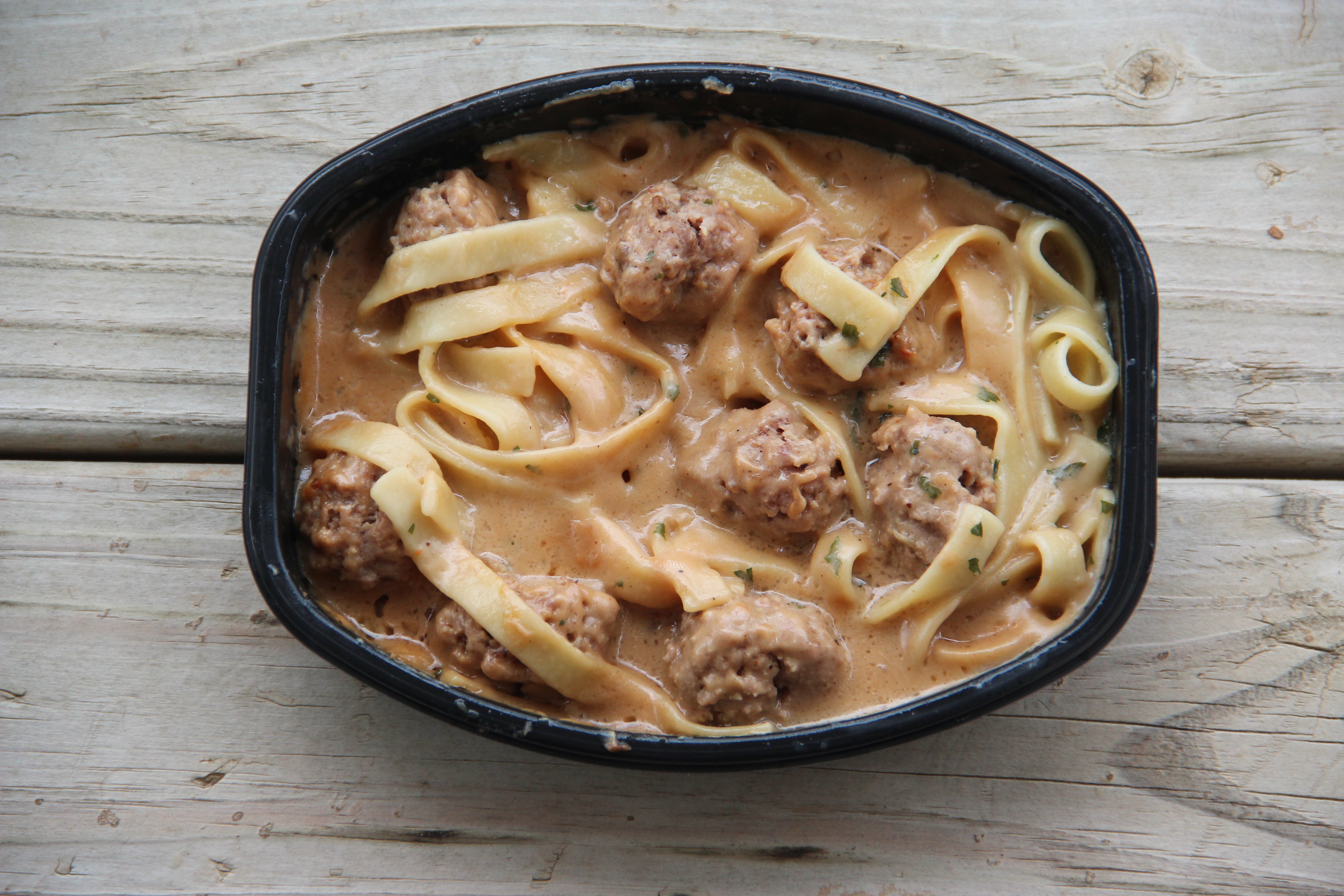
- Stouffer's cooked Swedish Meatballs
- Product type: Frozen food products
- Current owner: Nestlé (1973–present)
- Country: United States
- Introduced: 1922; 104 years ago
- Discontinued: 2023 (Canada only)
- Related brands: Lean Cuisine
- Markets: United States; Canada (until 2023)
- Previous owners: Litton Industries (1967–1973)
- Website: goodnes.com/stouffers

Stouffer's is a brand of frozen prepared foods sold in the United States, founded in Cleveland, Ohio in 1922 and currently produced by Nestlé Meals, a division of Nestlé USA. Stouffer's products were also sold in Canada by Nestlé Canada until 2023. Stouffer's products were originally produced by Stouffer Corporation starting in 1946, an offshoot of their chain of Stouffer's Restaurants. Stouffer Corporation was purchased by Nestlé in 1973 and fully integrated into its Nestlé USA division in 1998.

Stouffer's is known for such popular fare as lasagna, macaroni and cheese, meatloaf, ravioli, fettuccine Alfredo, and salisbury steak. Nestlé Meals also produces a line of reduced-fat products under the Lean Cuisine brand name. This was originally a Stouffer's subline, marketed under the name Stouffer's Lean Cuisine.

In the early 1960s, Stouffer's worked with noted chef Louis Szathmary to develop new frozen food products, including its classic spinach souffle. They were one of the first to self manufacture fresh pasta for frozen entrées by using a washdown capable DEMACO extruder instead of using dry pasta. In 2024, Nestlé Meals introduced Stouffer's Supreme, a line of shelf-stable dried mac and cheese products, the first non-frozen items sold under the Stouffer's name.
