= Jean Nidetch =

American entrepreneur (1923–2015)

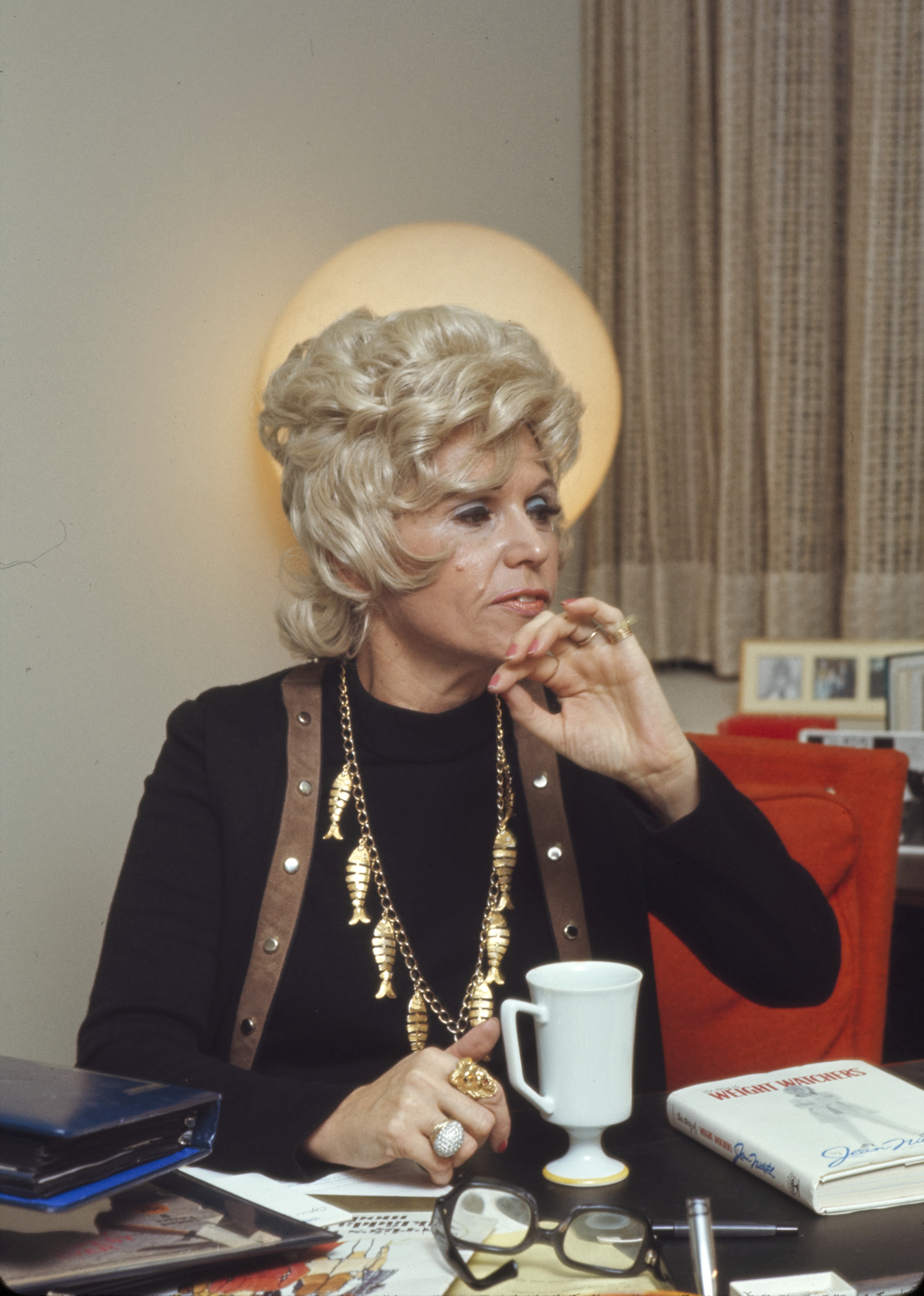
- Nidetch c. 1970–1980
- Born: Jean Evelyn Slutsky; October 12, 1923; Brooklyn, New York, U.S.
- Died: April 29, 2015 (aged 91); Parkland, Florida, U.S.
- Education: City College of New York
- Occupation: Businesswoman
- Known for: Co-founder of Weight Watchers
- Spouse(s): Mortimer Nidetch (divorced); Frank Schifano (divorced)
- Children: 2

Jean Evelyn Nidetch (October 12, 1923 – April 29, 2015) was an American businessperson and the founder of Weight Watchers.

She died on April 29, 2015, of natural causes at her home in Parkland, Florida, at the age of 91.
