= Stouffer Corporation =

American food corporation

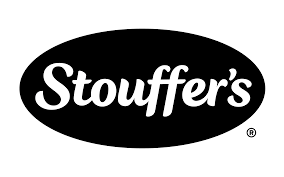
- Industry: Food; Restaurants; Hospitality
- Predecessor: Stouffer Lunch Systems (1924)
- Founded: 1929; 97 years ago
- Founder: Abraham E. Stouffer
- Defunct: 1998
- Fate: Fully merged into Nestlé USA's processed foods division (1998); restaurant and hotel divisions sold (1992-1993)
- Successor: Nestle Prepared Foods (until 2016); Nestlé Meals (current); Former divisions: Select Restaurants, Inc.; Renaissance Hotels
- Headquarters: Cleveland, Ohio (1929–1978); Solon, Ohio (1979–1998); United States
- Key people: Gordon and Vernon Stouffer
- Products: Stouffer's and Lean Cuisine frozen foods, Stouffer's Restaurants, Stouffer Hotels
- Parent: independent (1929-1967); Litton Industries (1967-1973); Nestlé Enterprises (1973-1990); Nestlé USA (1990-present)

Stouffer Corporation was an American corporation headquartered in Cleveland and later Solon, Ohio. Primarily known for its line of frozen foods, over its history, it has had a major presence in the restaurant and hospitality industries.

The Stoffer company began in 1922 as a lunch counter operated by Abraham E. Stouffer in Cleveland, Ohio, soon expanding into a chain of Stouffer Restaurants. In the 1940s, the company began selling a line of frozen foods from its restaurant locations, which proved so popular that frozen foods became the company's main focus by the mid-1950s. Stouffer Corporation was acquired by the cooking appliance company Litton Industries in 1967 and then the food conglomerate Nestlé in 1973, and existed as a wholly owned subsidiary corporation for the next quarter century.

Stouffer Corporation became a division of Nestlé USA in 1998 and was renamed Nestlé Prepared Foods. The division was merged with other units over the next several decades and its name was changed to Nestlé Foods in 2017, and later again renamed Nestlé Meals, its current name as of 2024. The division continues to produce a line of frozen foods under the brand name Stouffer's, but also uses different brand names for other lines of frozen foods, including Lean Cuisine, Sweet Earth, and Hot Pockets.

Nestlé USA divested itself of its restaurant and hotel subsidiaries in the early 1990s. Stouffer Restaurants was spun off as its own company, Select Restaurants, Inc. Stouffer Hotels went through a series of sales and the Stouffer branding was soon dropped. It is now fully integrated into the Renaissance Hotels subsidiary of Marriott International.

== History ==
=== 1922-1945: From lunch counter to restaurant chain ===
The Stouffer foods empire had its roots in the family business of Abraham E. Stouffer, a second-generation dairyman who had taken over his family's creamery business in the early 20th century. The creamery had opened a milk stand at the Cleveland Arcade in 1914. In 1922, Abraham Stouffer and his wife Lena Mahala Bigelow decided to convert the stand into a lunch counter, serving buttermilk, sandwiches, and Lena Stouffer's homemade Dutch apple pie (credited by some as the reason for the almost instant success of the restaurant). The success of their lunch counter led Stouffer to launch a second larger restaurant in downtown Cleveland in 1923. Securing $15,000 in capital, Stouffer incorporated as Stouffer Lunch Systems in 1924.

As time went on, the couple continued the program of expansion with the assistance of their sons Vernon, a graduate of the Wharton School of Finance, and Gordon, who together led the reorganization of the business, taking it public as the Stouffer Corporation in 1929, with Abraham as chairman of the board. Gordon Stouffer also introduced standardization throughout the chain, including uniforms for its "Stouffer Girls" waitresses and the motto "Everybody is somebody at Stouffer's". The Stouffer's chain expanded beyond Ohio in 1929, with the opening of restaurants in Detroit and Pittsburgh. The company opened its first restaurant in New York City in 1937, the chain's seventh location.

=== 1946-1990: From restaurant chain to conglomerate ===
Stouffer's Corporation began to diversify during the post-war era. The company opened its first suburban restaurant location in Shaker Heights, Ohio in 1946. Customers there began asking for frozen portions of popular menu items to reheat at home. To meet this demand, the manager of the Shaker Heights location, Wally Blankinship, opened a retail store selling frozen foods called 227 Club next to the restaurant, a concept that quickly spread to other locations. The frozen entrees were originally made in-restaurant and were noted for their high quality. Sales were so successful that in 1954, Stouffer's would open a processing plant in downtown Cleveland to mass-produce its frozen foods. In 1956, the company was formally renamed Stouffer Foods Corporation.

In 1960, Stouffer purchased its first hotel, the Anacapri Inn of Fort Lauderdale, Florida, and, by the end of that year, the company was composed of three divisions: Stouffer Foods, Stouffer Hotels, and Stouffer Restaurants.

In the late 1950s Stouffer began to diversify their restaurant operations, with locations that ranged from cafeterias to casual dining to premium casual and destination restaurants. Among Stouffer's destination restaurants was a collection of "Top of" penthouse restaurants in major office buildings, which began in 1958 with the Top of the Sixes atop Manhattan's 666 Fifth Avenue building, and would eventually grow into a group of 16 "Top of" restaurants, including Top of The Hub (Prudential Tower, Boston), Top of the Flame (One Woodward Avenue, Detroit), and Top of the Town (Erieview Tower, Cleveland). In 1965, Stouffer opened Pier W along the Lakewood, Ohio "Gold Coast", on a pier-shaped structure jetting out from a bluff overlooking Lake Erie.

In 1961, Stouffer's opened two short-lived automated vending restaurants. Stouffer's took over this complex of restaurants with the shared kitchen (Plaza Pavilion). In 1962 Stouffer's Disneyland operated the Plaza Pavilion Restaurant, the Tahitian Terrace, and the French Market Restaurant.

In 1967, the Stouffer Corporation was purchased by Litton Industries for vertical integration purposes, as that company had a large share of the microwave oven market. Increased demand for Stouffer's frozen foods strained production capacity at their Cleveland plant, and in 1968, Stouffer's opened a 42-acre site in Solon, Ohio to house Stouffer Foods. The site included a fully modernized and automated frozen food processing plant, as well as quality control, food research, and microbiological labs.

In 1973, Litton sold Stouffer to Nestlé, who continued to operate it as a subsidiary corporation of Nestlé Enterprises, Inc, Nestlé's US subsidiary. Under Nestlé's ownership, the Stouffer restaurant division would expand during the 1970s and 1980s, opening or acquiring several premium casual restaurants and chains, including the 1975 launch of the James Tavern and Cheese Cellar (later J.B. Winberie) chains. That same year, Stouffer Corporation acquired Borel Restaurant Corporation (operators of The Rusty Scupper chain), which would continue to operate as a subsidiary corporation of Stouffer until 1986, when it was full merged into Stouffer Restaurants. In the 1980s, Borel Corporation would also launch a small chain of Parker's Lighthouse restaurants. Conversely, the company began scaling back its original Stouffer's restaurants, with the last one closing in late 1983.

Stouffer's foods division created Lean Cuisine in 1981 to provide a diet-conscious alternative to Stouffer's frozen meals.

=== 1990-present: From conglomerate to product division ===
In 1990, Nestlé Enterprises rebranded as Nestlé USA and decided to further restructure its divisions. At the time, it ran 68 restaurant locations under various names and 40 hotel and resort locations. After abandoning an initial plan to merge Stouffer Restaurants with Stouffer Hotels, Nestlé put Stouffer Restaurants up for sale, as restaurants were only a tiny fraction of their overall business. In October 1992, Stouffer Restaurants was spun off from Nestlé when the company was purchased by a corporate management group composed of former Stouffer's executives and rebranded as Select Restaurants, Inc. Select Restaurants remains in business as of 2025, operating 8 restaurants located across the United States.

In 1993, Nestlé decided that Stouffer should be focused exclusively on frozen and prepared food products, and announced its intention to sell Stouffer Hotels to the New World Development Company (which at that time owned the Ramada and Renaissance Hotel brands). The Stouffer Hotel brand was retired by the end of 1996, with all Stouffer Hotels being rebranded as Renaissance Hotels. Renaissance Hotels was then acquired by Marriott International in 1997, and remains in business as a subsidiary as of 2025.

Stouffer Foods would remain as the sole remaining subsidiary of Nestlé USA and was fully integrated as a division of Nestlé USA in 1998, first under the name Nestlé USA-Frozen Foods, Inc, renamed Nestlé Prepared Foods in 2000. In 2002, Nestlé USA acquired Chef America, Inc, the producer of Hot Pockets, which was merged into the Prepared Foods Division. The division would continue under this name through 2016, though merging with other units and expanding its product line beyond frozen foods. In 2017, the unit was renamed Nestlé Food Division (or alternately, Nestlé Foods Division). However the division was again renamed and as of 2024, it is called Nestlé Meals Division.

Stouffer's and Lean Cuisine products were distributed in Canada by Nestlé Canada, however, Nestlé Canada exited the frozen food business in 2023.

== Product line ==
As of 2025, Nestlé USA continues to produce its Stouffer's frozen food product line, as well as several other brand names of frozen foods, including Lean Cuisine, a diet food line, Sweet Earth, a line of vegan and vegetarian dishes, and Hot Pockets, a line of frozen turnovers.

In 2024, Nestlé Meals introduced Stouffer's Supreme, a line of shelf-stable dried mac and cheese products, the first non-frozen items sold under the Stouffer's name.

== Legal conflicts ==
In 1991, the Federal Trade Commission issued a complaint that Stouffer Foods had misrepresented sodium content in their Lean Cuisine entrees by stating that they were low in sodium. Stouffer's argued that the campaign had focused on good taste and controlled sodium, fat, and calories. They also argued that the sodium claim was relative, reflecting a lower amount of sodium, not necessarily that the entrees were low sodium. However, the Administrative Law Judge ruled in favor of the Federal Trade Commission.

In 2003, Applebee's sued Nestlé USA over trademark infringement in 1997 for their use of "Stouffer's Skillet Sensations." Applebee's had a line of "Skillet Sensations" of their own and claimed that it caused confusion for customers that believed the Stouffer's line was linked to theirs. The U.S. Trademark Trial and Appeal Board ruled in favor of Applebee's.
