= Weight Watchers (diet) =

Commercial eating plan and program for weight loss and a healthier diet

The Weight Watchers logo

Weight Watchers or WW was a commercial program for weight loss based on a point system, meals replacement and counseling.

== Description ==
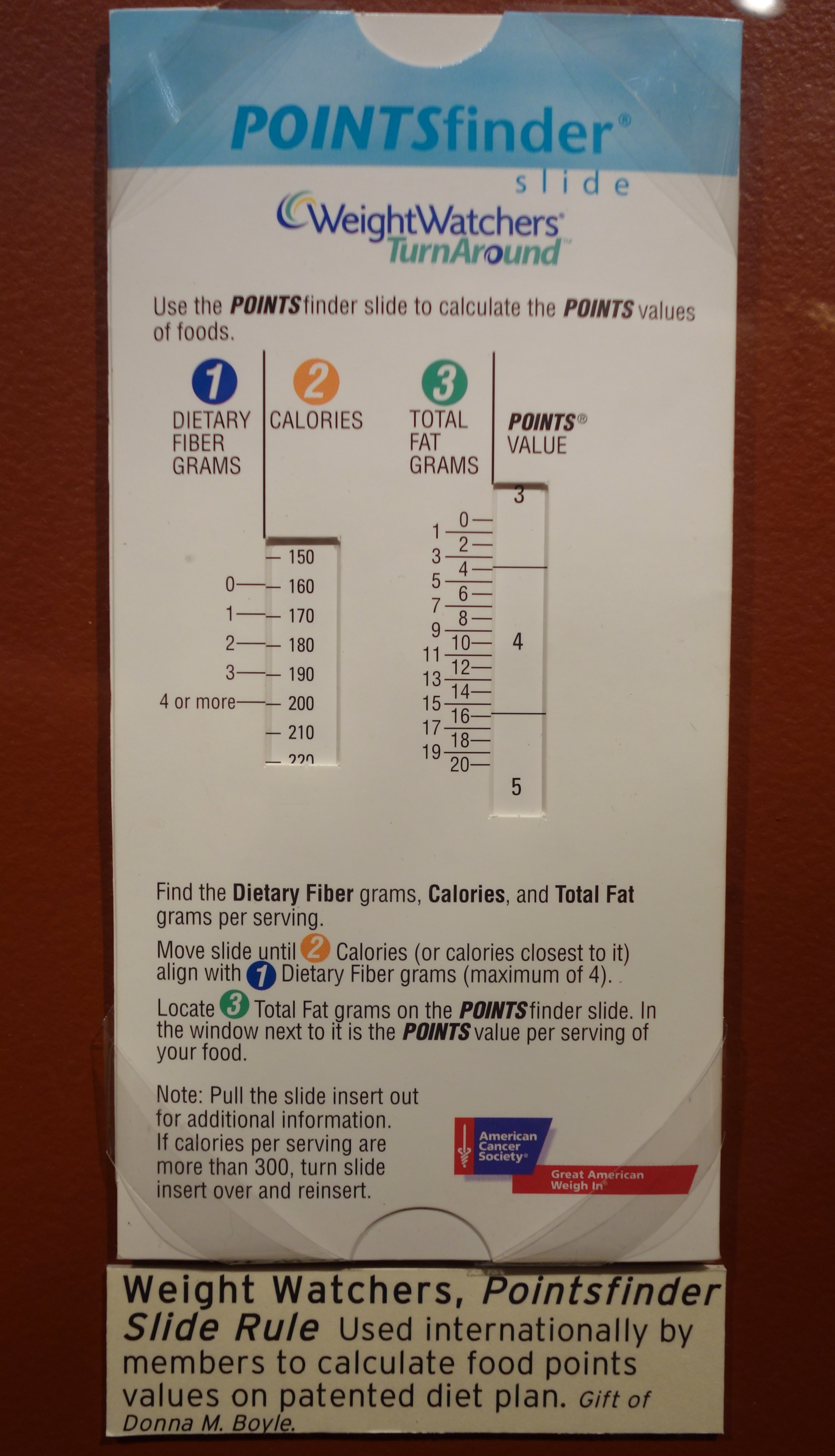
A Weight Watchers sliding ruler to track food points to ease calories restriction targets.

The Weight Watchers diet tries to restrict energy to achieve a weight loss of 0.5 to 1.0 kg per week, which is the medically accepted standard rate of a viable weight loss strategy. The dietary composition is akin to low-fat diets or moderate-fat and low-carbohydrate diet depending on the variant used.

Contrary to several other diets, Weight Watchers does not focus on the calories but simplifies food selection with a points-based system named "SmartPoints", where each food type is assigned a point value calculated according to their nutrient and energy density. A point equals 50 cal. The point values system define both a quality scale and a quantity limit: a food with low point values, such as high fiber carbohydrates, lean proteins, legumes, can be consumed more freely and in higher quantities, whereas food items with higher point values must be eaten with parsimony or avoided. Most fruits and vegetables are "free", as they have a zero points value, and thus can be consumed at will.

The parent company also produces meal replacements, which are "plug-in" meals that can be instantly consumed instead of the usual diet. Weight Watchers claims that meal replacements have been shown to outperform calorie-controlled diets, as there is less margin for errors and less decision-making and cooking skills are required.

The dieters are also recommended to engage in regular physical activity as part of a broader lifestyle change to complement their dietary changes, which mirrors the US national recommendations since 2013.

In addition to the diet and related consumable products made by the brand, the Weight Watchers includes counseling via weekly or monthly meetings, calorie targets, and online support. For children, online support, especially via social media, has shown mixed results.

== Efficacy ==
The Weight Watchers diet claims to produce weight loss comparable to other diets supervised by a nutrition professional.

The scientific soundness of commercial diets by commercial weight management organizations (CWMOs) varies widely, being previously non-evidence-based, so there is only limited evidence supporting their use, including Weight Watchers, due notably to high attrition rates.

Weight Watchers claims to result in modest weight loss in the long-term, similarly to other commercial diets, non-commercial diets and standard care, although Weight Watchers may have less cardiovascular and glucose-lowering benefits than other diets such as low-carbohydrates.

In a trial comparing four weight loss diets, the drop-out rate for the Weight Watchers diet was 35% (compared to others which had up to 50% drop-outs).

Two systematic reviews found that Weight Watchers was the most cost-effective commercial diet as of 2019.

== History ==
Jean Nidetch, a housewife and mother living in Queens, New York City, conceived the original Weight Watchers diet and program in the 1960s, after her dissatisfaction with other weight loss programs, all of which failed except the "Prudent Diet", a diet developed in the 1950s by Dr. Norman Jolliffe, head of the New York City Board of Health's Bureau of Nutrition. Bringing inspiration from this successful but frustratingly difficult to sustain diet because of the lack of communication and its discouragement of peers discussions, Nidetch designed the original Weight Watchers around the same nutritional principles favoring lean meat, fish, skim milk, and fruits and vegetables, and banning alcohol, sweets, and fatty foods, but with the additional scheduling of support groups to foster discussion and motivation. It thus had lists of allowed and prohibited foods, and was more structured than subsequent versions of the Weight Watchers program, such as recommending weighing food portions, prohibiting skipping meals or counting calories, before later adopting a more flexible point based system, while keeping the group support meetings and personalized coaching which differentiated this diet from its predecessor.

In commercials, a furry orange monster named Hungry Monster appears to help people make healthier food choices.

As of 2013, over a million members attend its weekly group meetings over the world.

In 2018, Weight Watchers was ranked by U.S. News & World Report as 1st in "Best commercial diet", "Best Weight-Loss Diets" and "Best Fast Weight-Loss Diets" and 2nd in "Easiest Diets to Follow".

== See also ==
- Healthy diet
- List of diets
