= Heinz =

Defunct American food processing company

Coordinates: 40.4545°N 79.9909°W

Kraft Heinz Foods Company

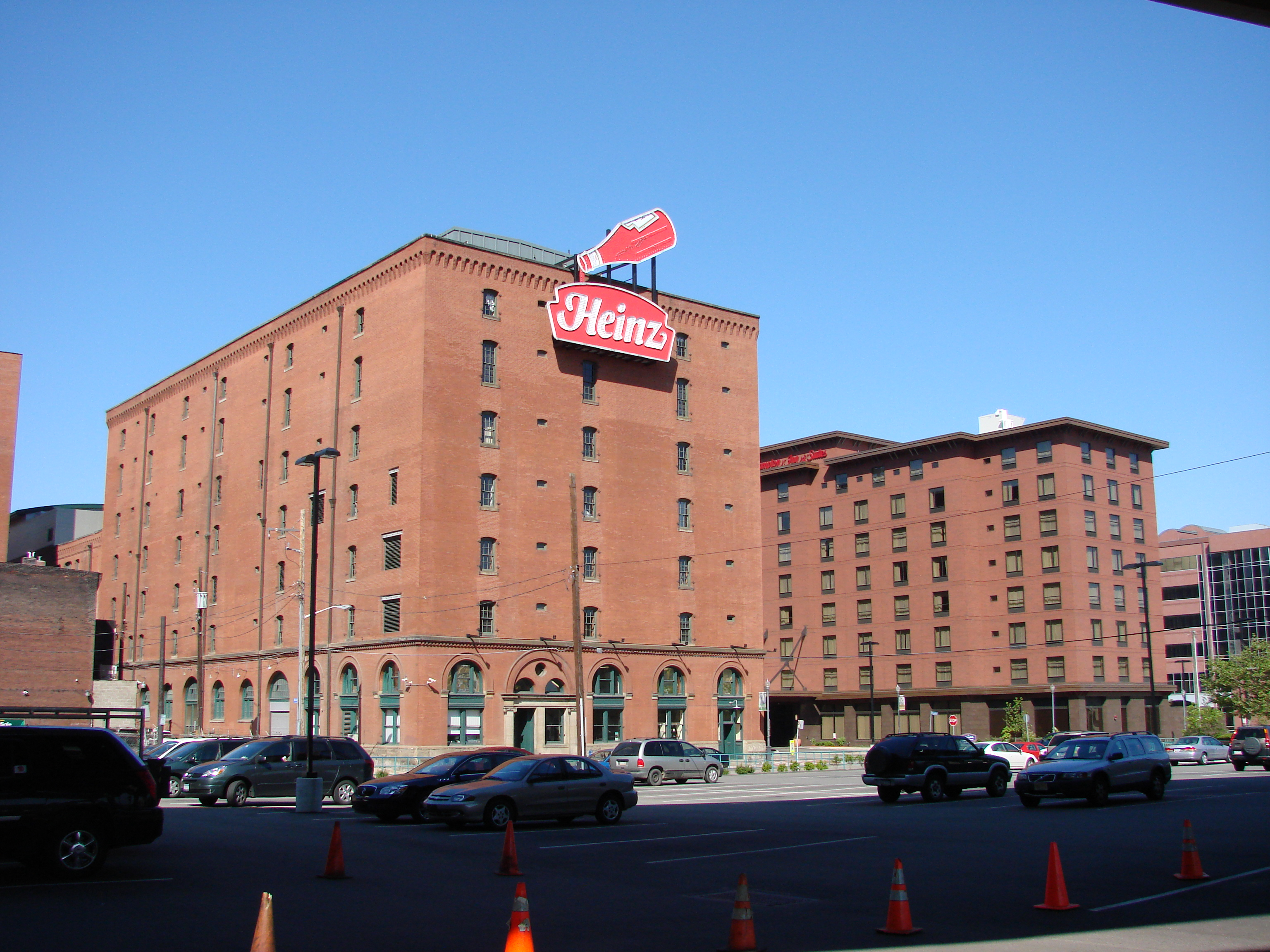
- Senator John Heinz History Center in Pittsburgh in 2008
- Formerly: Heinz Noble & Company; H. J. Heinz Company
- Type: Subsidiary
- Traded as: NYSE: HNZ (until 2013) S&P 100 component (until 2013) S&P 500 component (until 2013)
- Industry: Food processing
- Founded: January 1869 (as Heinz Noble & Company); Sharpsburg, Pennsylvania, U.S.
- Founder: Henry J. Heinz
- Defunct: July 2, 2015; 11 years ago
- Fate: Merged with Kraft Foods to form its subsidiary Kraft Heinz
- Successor: Kraft Heinz
- Headquarters: One PPG Place, Pittsburgh, Pennsylvania, United States
- Area served: Worldwide
- Products: Sauces, condiments
- Parent: Kraft Heinz
- Website: heinz.com

The H. J. Heinz Company, commonly known as Heinz (/haɪnz/), was an American food processing company headquartered at One PPG Place in Pittsburgh, Pennsylvania. The company was founded by Henry J. Heinz in 1869. Heinz manufactured food products on six continents, and marketed them in more than 200 countries and territories. The company claimed to have 150 number-one or number-two brands worldwide as of 2013. Heinz ranked first in ketchup in the US with a market share in excess of 50%; the Ore-Ida label held 46% of the frozen potato sector in 2003.

Since 1896, the company has used its "57 Varieties" slogan; it was inspired by a sign advertising 21 styles of shoes, and Henry Heinz chose the number 57 even though the company then manufactured more than 60 products, because "5" was his lucky number and "7" was his wife's.

In February 2013, Heinz agreed to be purchased by Berkshire Hathaway and the Brazilian investment firm 3G Capital for $23 billion. On March 25, 2015, Kraft announced its merger with Heinz, arranged by Berkshire Hathaway and 3G Capital. The resulting Kraft Heinz Company is the fifth largest food company in the world. Berkshire Hathaway became a majority owner of Heinz on June 18, 2015. After exercising a warrant to acquire 46 million shares of common stock for a total price of over $461 million, Berkshire increased its stake to 52.5%. The merger to form Kraft Heinz was completed on July 2, 2015.

== History ==
=== Foundation ===
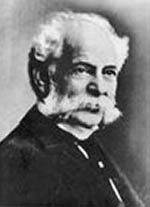
Henry J. Heinz, founder

Heinz was founded by and is named for Henry J. Heinz, who was born in the United States to German immigrants. His father was originally from Kallstadt (then part of the Bavarian Rhenish Palatinate, now part of Rhineland-Palatinate). His mother Anna was from Haunetal, Hesse-Kassel, and they met in Pittsburgh.

Henry J. Heinz began packing foodstuffs on a small scale at Sharpsburg, Pennsylvania, in 1869. There he founded Heinz Noble & Company with a friend, L. Clarence Noble, and began marketing horseradish. The first product in Heinz and Noble's new Anchor Brand (a name selected for its biblical meaning of hope) was his mother Anna Heinz's recipe for horseradish. The young Heinz manufactured it in the basement of his father's former house.

The company went bankrupt in 1875. The following year, Heinz founded another company, F & J Heinz, with his brother John Heinz and a cousin, Frederick Heinz. One of this company's first products was Heinz Tomato Ketchup. The company continued to grow.

In 1888, Heinz bought out his two partners and reorganized the company as the H. J. Heinz Company. Its slogan, "57 varieties", was introduced by Heinz in 1896. Inspired by an advertisement he saw while riding an elevated train in New York City (a shoe store boasting "21 styles"), Heinz picked the number more or less at random because he liked the sound of it, selecting "7" specifically because, as he put it, of the "psychological influence of that figure and of its enduring significance to people of all ages".

=== 20th century ===
The H. J. Heinz Company was incorporated in Pennsylvania on July 27, 1900; Heinz served as its first president, holding that position for the rest of his life. Under his leadership, the company pioneered processes for sanitary food preparation, and led a successful lobbying effort in favor of the Pure Food and Drug Act in 1906. In 1908 he established a processing plant in Leamington, Ontario, Canada for tomatoes and other products. Heinz operated it until 2014, when it was sold.

Heinz was a pioneer in both scientific and "technological innovations to solve problems like bacterial contamination". He personally worked to control the "purity of his products by managing his employees", offering hot showers and weekly manicures for the women handling food. During World War I, he worked with the Food Administration.

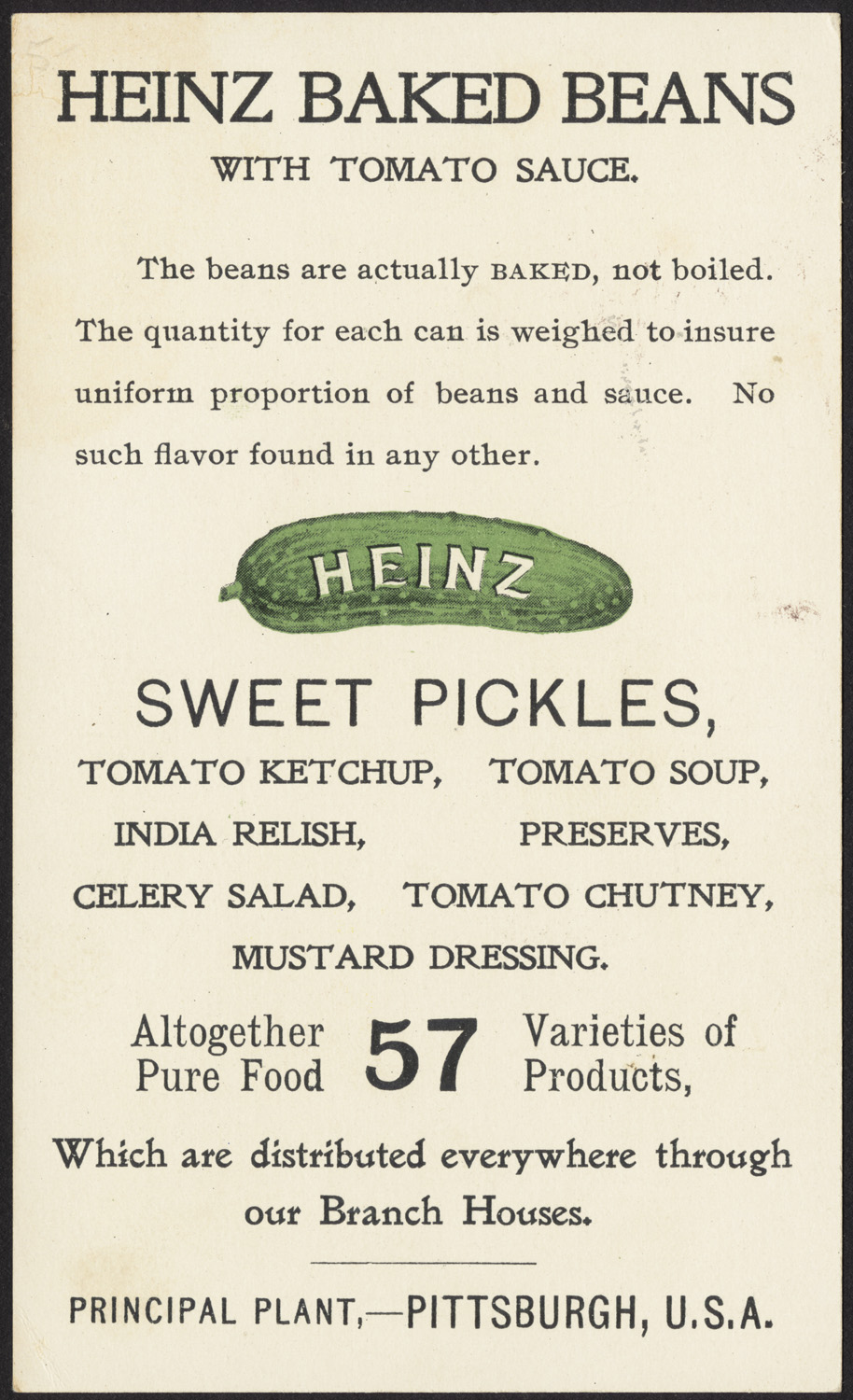
Heinz trade card from the 19th century, promoting various products. Features the Heinz pickle

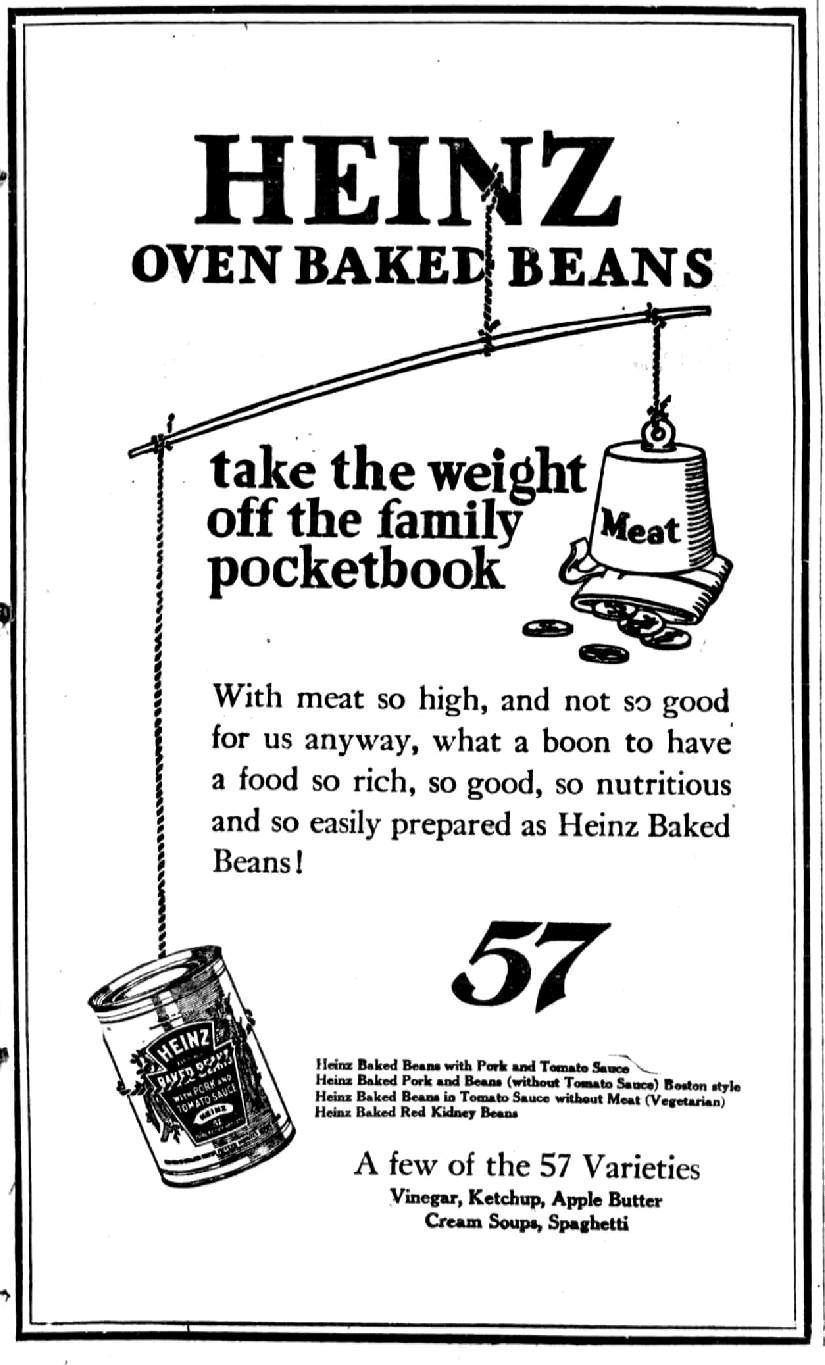
Heinz Oven-Baked Beans newspaper ad from 1919

In 1914, Heinz Salad Cream was invented in England.

In 1930, Howard Heinz, son of Henry Heinz, helped to fight the downturn of the Great Depression by selling ready-to-serve soups and baby food. They became top sellers.

The Pittsburgh plant included a large "Heinz service building", which included three dining rooms and a 3,000-seat auditorium. The auditorium included a pipe organ, and Heinz employed an organist to give recitals and musical programs. The original organ was severely damaged in the 1936 Pittsburgh floods, it was replaced with a new Kimball organ that had four manuals and 57 sets of pipes. The original organ was restored and installed in Grace Methodist Church in Sharpsburg.

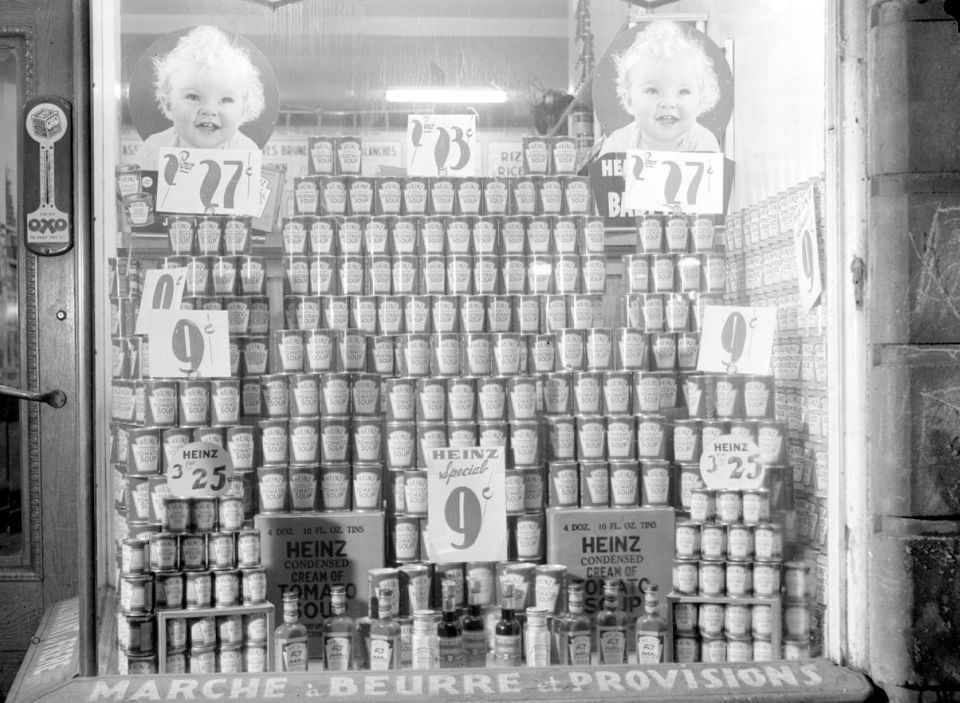
Display of canned products of Heinz Company in the window of the store Tousignant & Frère, Wellington Street, Verdun, Quebec, 1944

During World War II, "Jack" Heinz led the company as president and CEO to aid the United Kingdom and offset food shortages. Its plant in Pittsburgh was converted for a time to manufacture gliders for the War Department.

In the postwar years, Jack Heinz expanded the company to develop plants in several nations overseas, greatly expanding its international presence. He also acquired Ore-Ida and Starkist Tuna.

In 1959, long-time Heinz employee Frank Armour Jr. was elected president and COO of H. J. Heinz Co., succeeding H. J. Heinz II. He was the first non-family member to hold the job since the company started in 1869. He became vice chairman in 1966, and later became chairman and CEO of Heinz subsidiary, Ore-Ida Foods Inc.

Secondary logo since 1969

In 1969, Tony O'Reilly joined the company's UK subsidiary, soon becoming its managing director. He moved to Pittsburgh in 1971 when he was promoted to senior vice president for the North America and Pacific region. By 1973, Heinz selected him as president. He became CEO in 1979 and chairman in 1987.

Between 1981 and 1991, Heinz returned 28% annually, doubling the Standard & Poor's average annual return for those years. By 2000, the consolidation of grocery store chains, the spread of retailers such as Walmart, and growth of private-label brands caused competition for shelf space, and put price pressure on the company's products. The decline was also attributed to an inadequate response to broad demographic changes in the United States, particularly the growth in population among Hispanic and increased spending power of African Americans.

In 1998, Tony O'Reilly left Heinz after issues with the company's performance. He faced challenges from corporate governance groups and pension funds including CalPERS. He was succeeded by his deputy, William R. Johnson.

=== 21st century ===
In 2001, Heinz acquired the pasta sauce, dry bouillon and soup business of Borden Foods. CEO William R. Johnson stated that "They fit very well with our tomato-based expertise".

On August 22, 2001, Heinz announced that it would acquire the Anchor Food Products' branded products, which included the Poppers line of appetizers, as well as the licensing rights to the TGI Fridays brand of frozen foods and appetizers. The acquisition was completed on September 25.

Billionaire Nelson Peltz initiated a proxy battle during 2006, culminating in a vote to place five of Peltz's nominees on the Board. After the final vote, two of the five nominees joined the Heinz Board. The new members of the board were Nelson Peltz and Matthew Craig Walsh.

In 2002, Heinz announced that it had sold the StarKist and 9Lives brands to Del Monte Foods.

In June 2008, Heinz began an advertising campaign in the UK for its new "New York Deli Mayo" products. The advertisement featured two men kissing in a family setting, which drew 200 complaints to the Advertising Standards Authority. On June 24, 2008, Heinz withdrew the advertisement, which had been planned for a five-week run. The company said that some of its customers had expressed concerns. Withdrawing the advert was also controversial, with critics accusing Heinz of homophobia. The gay rights group Stonewall called for a boycott of Heinz products. Some expressed surprise that it had responded to what they said was a relatively small number of complaints, compared to the UK's estimated 3.6 million gay and lesbian consumers. MP Diane Abbott called the decision to withdraw the advert "ill-considered" and "likely to offend the gay community".

On February 14, 2013, it was announced that Heinz would be purchased by Berkshire Hathaway and 3G Capital for $23 billion. Including debt assumption the transaction was valued at $28 billion. According to Heinz, the deal was the largest in food industry history. Berkshire Hathaway and 3G would each own half of Heinz, with 3G running the company. Berkshire and 3G paid $72.50 a share. The acquisition was completed in June of that year. Berkshire and 3G immediately named Bernardo Hees, former chief executive of Burger King Worldwide Inc, as the CEO.

On August 13, 2013, Heinz announced it was cutting 600 jobs in North America. On October 25, 2013, fast-food chain McDonald's announced it would end its 40-year relationship with Heinz, after the former Burger King, McDonald's competitor, chief Hees became CEO of Heinz.

On March 25, 2015, Kraft Foods Group Inc. announced that it would merge with the H. J. Heinz Company, owned by 3G Capital and Berkshire Hathaway Inc., to form the world's fifth-largest food and beverage company. The companies completed the merger on July 2, 2015, with the latter changing its name to the Kraft Heinz Foods Company.

In 2024, Carlos Abrams-Rivera was named CEO of Kraft Heinz Co.

== Brands ==
- ABC
- Bull's-Eye
- Classico
- Complan
- Daddies
- Devour
- De Ruijter
- Delimex
- Diana Sauce
- Farex
- Greenseas
- Heinz
- HP Sauce
- Jack Daniel's sauces (under license)
- Lea & Perrins
- Ore-Ida
- Bagel Bites
- T.G.I. Friday's (under license)
- Wattie's
- Weight Watchers (under license)
- Wyler's

== Products ==
- Beanz
- Italian Beanz
- Lentil Curry
- Mexican Beanz
- No Added Sugar Beanz
- No Added Sugar Beanz Snap Pots
- Organic Beanz
- Peri Peri Beanz
- Pork Sausage Beanz
- Smokey Bacon Beanz
- Spanish Beanz
- Tikka Beanz (Limited Edition)
- Jalfrezi Beanz (Limited Edition)
- Vindaloo Beanz (Limited Edition)

=== Dressings ===
- Balsamic With a hint of Garlic
- Chilli & Lime
- Raspberry Balsamic
- Zesty Lemon

=== Pastas ===
- Alphabetti
- Beef Ravioli
- Hoops
- Hoops Snap Pots
- Macaroni Cheese
- Micro Spaghetti Snap Pots
- No Added Sugar Hoops
- Numberetti
- Peppa Pig Pasta Shapes
- Spaghetti
- Spaghetti Bolognese
- Spaghetti With Sausages
- Spaghetti Carbonara

=== Sauces ===
- Mayonnaise
- Chocolate Mayonnaise (A limited time flavor available in Easter 2018 and Christmas 2021)
- Light Mayonnaise
- Garlic & Caramelized Onion Mayonnaise
- Truffle Mayonnaise
- Lemon & Black Pepper Mayonnaise
- Salad Cream
- Salad Cream 30% Less Fat
- Salad Cream 70% Less Fat
- Classic Barbecue Sauce
- Sticky Barbecue Sauce
- Sweet & Spicy Barbecue Sauce
- American Style Smokey Baconnaise Sauce
- Korean Style Sticky Barbecue Sauce
- American Style Burger Sauce
- Thai Style Sweet Chilli Sauce
- Thai Style Coconut Lime Sauce
- Turkish Style Garlic Sauce
- Mild Yellow Mustard
- Honey Yellow Mustard
- Piccalilli Pickle
- Ploughman's Pickle
- Original Sandwich Spread
- Light Sandwich Spread
- Saucy Sauce (Mayo & Ketchup Sauce)
- Heinz Tomato Ketchup
- Aromatic Herbs Ketchup
- Balsamic Vinegar Ketchup
- Fiery Chilli Tomato Ketchup
- Jalapeño Chilli Tomato Ketchup
- Organic Tomato Ketchup
- Pickle Ketchup
- Roasted Garlic Ketchup
- Sweet Chilli Tomato Ketchup
- Firecracker

=== Soups ===
- Cream of Tomato
- Cream of Chicken
- Vegetable
- Cream of Mushroom
- Cream of Tomato with a Kick of Chilli
- Lentil
- Oxtail
- Organic Cream of Tomato
- Beef Broth
- Carrot and Coriander
- Cream of Chicken and Mushroom
- Chicken and Sweetcorn
- Chicken Noodle Soup
- Lentil & Bacon
- Minestrone
- Mulligatawny
- No Added Sugar Cream of Tomato
- No Added Sugar Vegetable
- Pea & Ham
- Potato & Leek
- Scotch Broth
- Spring Vegetable
- Cream of Tomato with Basil
- Cream of Tomato Cup Soup
- Vegetable Cup Soup
- Cream of Tomato with a Kick of Chilli Cup Soup
- Cream of Chicken Cup Soup
- Cream of Mushroom Cup Soup
- Cream of Tomato with Basil Cup Soup
- Minestrone Cup Soup
- Oxtail Cup Soup
- Spiced Butternut Squash & Chickpea Eatwell Soup
- Tomato & Cannellini Eatwell Soup
- Tomato Spinach & Lentil Eatwell Soup
- Cream of Chicken Pot Soup
- Cream of Mushroom Pot Soup
- Cream of Tomato Pot Soup
- Smooth Vegetable Pot Soup
- Cauliflower, Onion & Potato Soup of the Day
- Chicken, Parsnip & Rosemary Soup of the Day
- Green Garden Vegetables Soup of the Day
- Mushroom & Toasted Garlic Soup of the Day
- Potato & Leek with chives Soup of the Day
- Spice Pumpkin, Sweet Potato & Carrot Soup of the Day
- Tomato, Roasted Garlic & Black Pepper Soup of the Day

== International presence ==
=== United States ===
The company's world headquarters were in Chicago, Illinois, with the H. J. Heinz division located in Pittsburgh, Pennsylvania, where the company was founded. The company's "keystone" logo was based on that of Pennsylvania, the "keystone state". Heinz Field was named after the Heinz company in 2001.

A majority of its ketchup was produced in Fremont, Ohio, and the rest made in Muscatine, Iowa.

Heinz opened a pickle factory in Holland, Michigan, in 1897, and it is the largest such facility in the world. The Heinz Portion Control subsidiary is located in Jacksonville, Florida, and produces single-serving containers of ketchup, mustard, salad dressings, jams, jellies and syrups.

Heinz also had factories in the following locations: Arizona (Phoenix); California (Chatsworth, Escalon, Irvine, San Diego); Florida (Fort Myers); Idaho (Pocatello); Iowa (Cedar Rapids, Muscatine); Massachusetts (Newburyport); Ohio (Mason, Massillon); Oregon (Ontario), and South Carolina (Florence).

In 2000, seven retailers, including Walmart, Albertsons, and Safeway, comprised half of the company's sales by volume.

=== Australia ===
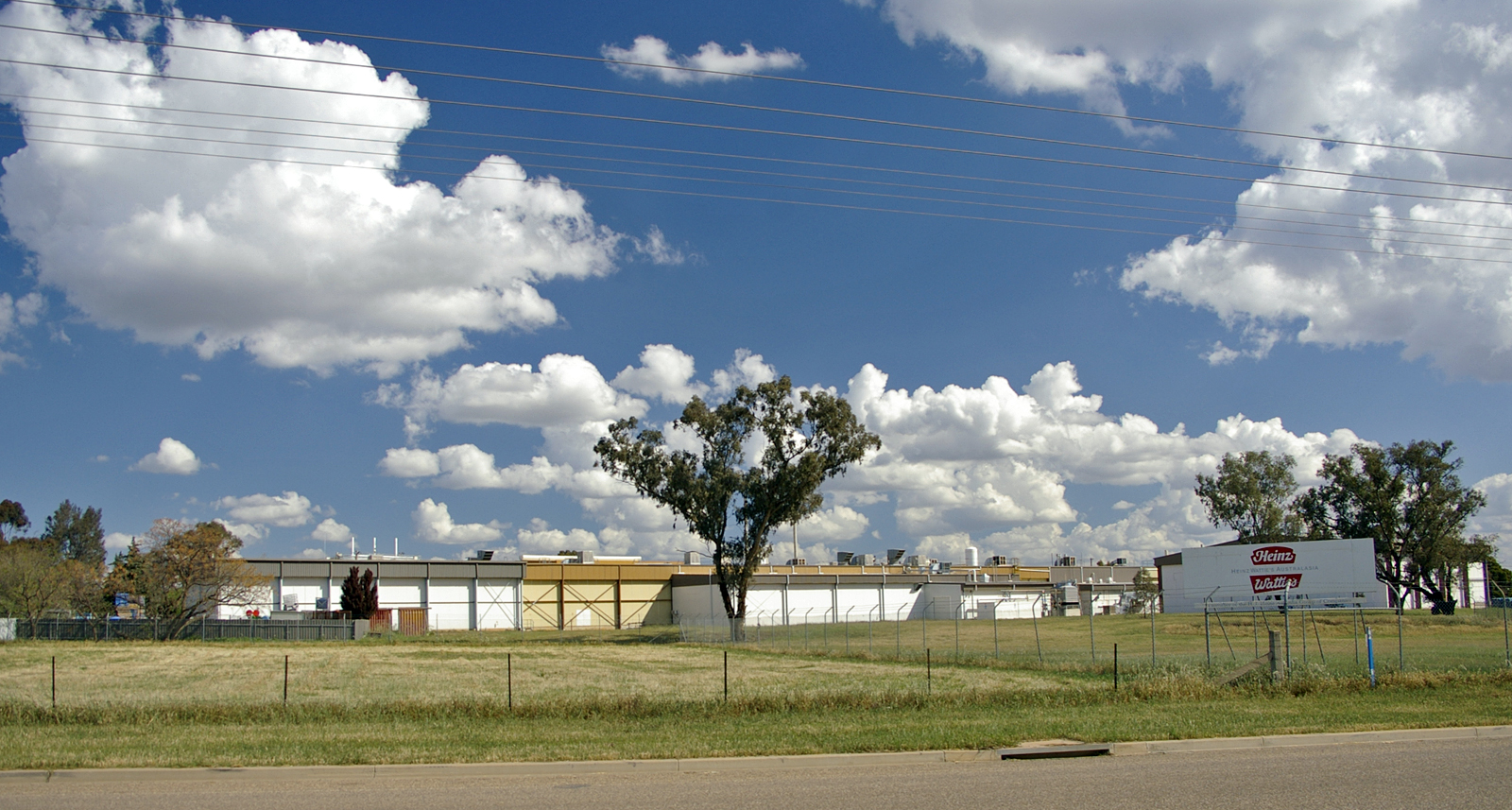
Heinz-Watties factory in Wagga Wagga

Heinz Australia's head office is located in Melbourne. Products include canned baked beans in tomato sauce (popularized in the "beanz meanz Heinz" advertising campaign), spaghetti in a similar sauce, and canned soup, condensed soup, and "ready to eat" soups.

Heinz manufactures "Big Red" tomato sauce, and a number of flavored baked bean varieties, as well as canned meals. Heinz also markets the Wattie's brand of canned foods, which are made in New Zealand.

On October 6, 2008, Heinz announced plans to acquire the Australian company Golden Circle which "manufactures more than 500 products, including canned fruit and vegetables, fruit juices, drinks, cordials and jams".

On May 27, 2011, Heinz announced it would close its factory in Girgarre, Victoria, and downsize its factories in Northgate (Brisbane), and Wagga Wagga, with loss of more than 300 jobs. Heinz has other factories in Echuca and Mill Park.

On January 6, 2012, Heinz closed its tomato sauce factory in Girgarre as announced in the previous May. 146 workers lost their jobs. A local group was seeking to purchase the factory and start its own production, with offers of financial assistance from investors. The group's first offer for the site was rejected by Heinz. Girgarre was the second to last tomato sauce factory in Australia, and its closing brought an end to Heinz's 70 years of tomato processing operations in Australia.

As of May 2020 Kraft Heinz is said to potentially be in discussions with Graeme Hart to sell off the brands of Wattie's in New Zealand and Golden Circle in Australia.

=== Canada ===
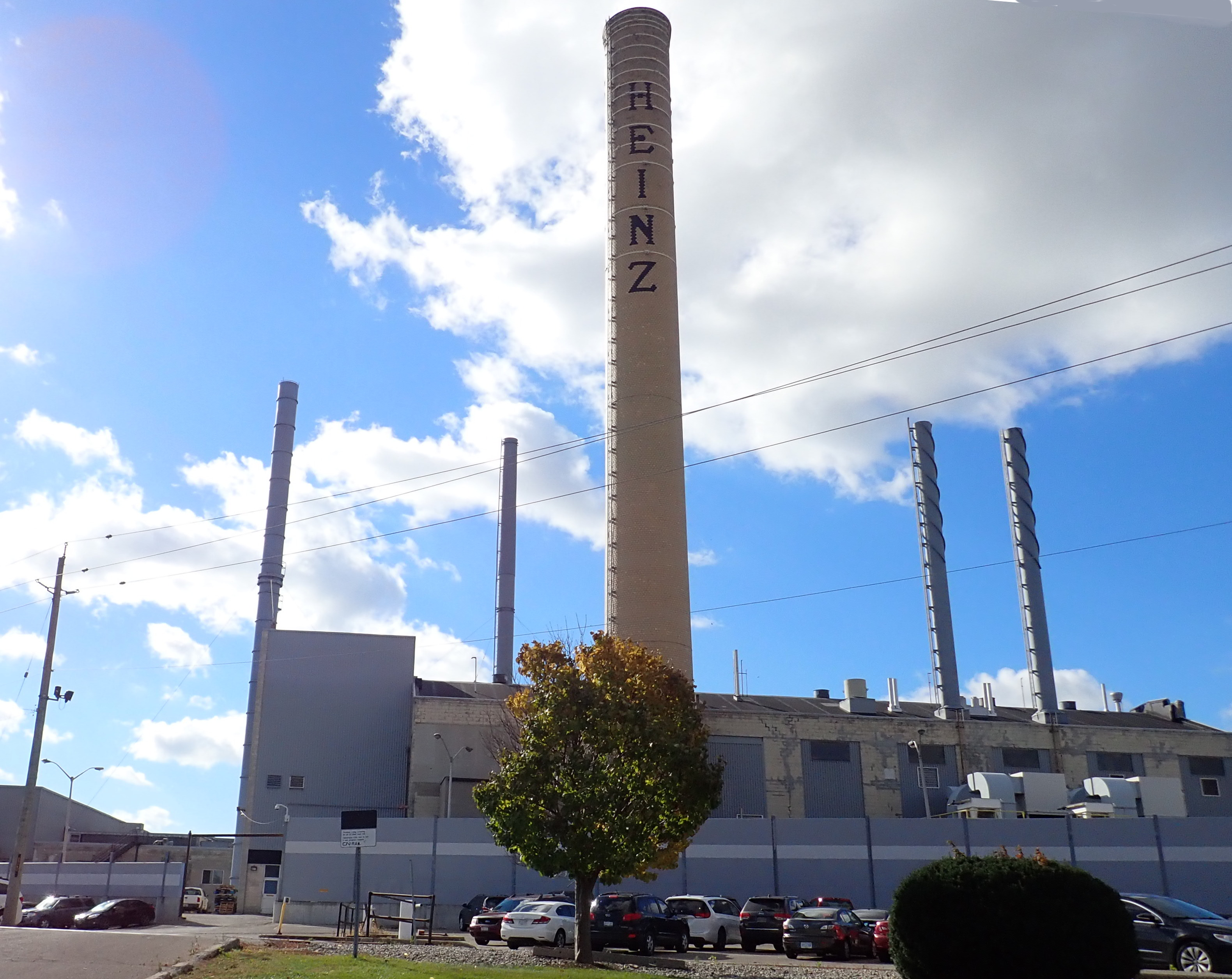
The former Heinz plant, Leamington, Ontario

Heinz was established in Canada in 1908 in a former tobacco factory in Leamington, Ontario (known as the Tomato Capital of Canada). Most products shipped from Leamington have bilingual English and French labels for distribution throughout Canada, but a substantial amount of product is sent from there to the US. Ketchup is the main product produced there, and the city has been a center of tomato production. The factory also produces Canada Fancy (Grade A) tomato juice, mustard, vinegar, baby food, barbecue sauces, canned pastas, beans, pasta sauces, gravies and soups. Heinz Canada is the major supplier of single-serving and flexible-packaging condiments for most fast food chains in Canada. Leamington is the largest tomato-processing region per acreage in the world. The Leamington plant usually processes more than 250,000 tons of tomatoes per year. Heinz Canada's head office is in North York, Ontario; it also has operations in St. Marys, Ontario; Montreal, Quebec; and Calgary, Alberta.

On November 14, 2013, Heinz announced that the Leamington facility, the second-largest in the company, would close sometime in May 2014. Ketchup processing operations were to be consolidated at the company's US locations. Over 800 local jobs were lost due to the town's largest employer ending operations there. A local effort began in an attempt to save the 105-year-old Leamington plant, and it included creating a Facebook page to gather support. On February 27, 2014, the Highbury Canco Corporation signed a letter of intent to acquire and operate the facility. In April it was reported that Highbury Canco Corporation had received a one-year license to process tomatoes at the facility, saving some 250 jobs.

As a result of this corporate restructuring and the angry Canadian response, a rival food company, French's, began producing its own ketchup brand using Leamington produce. It marketed the brand with an appeal to Canadian patriotism. This successful campaign, combined with a Canadian grassroots effort on Facebook encouraging purchasing of the French's product, resulted in Heinz's market share in Canada dropping from 84 to 76%, a significant shift in a mature market. This undesirable development was exacerbated in 2018 when Canadian tariffs were erected against specific American exports, which includes ketchup produced in the United States, in retaliation to the US President Trump's tariffs on Canadian steel and aluminum exports. Heinz conducted a belated public relations campaign in Canada to try to counter the public anger against them, a task made more difficult by public sentiment rising to encourage a boycott of American goods in reaction of US President Trump's rhetoric against Canada.

=== India ===
Heinz Ketchup is available in India in two varieties, the standard Tomato Ketchup and Tomato Chili Sauce. As Indian taste preferences vary among the regions, Western brands such as Heinz must work on Indian interpretations of ketchups for sale in the country. Heinz acquired the former foods division of Glaxo India, gaining the Complan, Glucon D, Glucon C, Sampriti Ghee, and Nycil products and brands. In 2019, Heinz sold a portion of the business, including Complan and Glucon-D, for $627.18 million to Zydus Wellness.

=== Indonesia ===
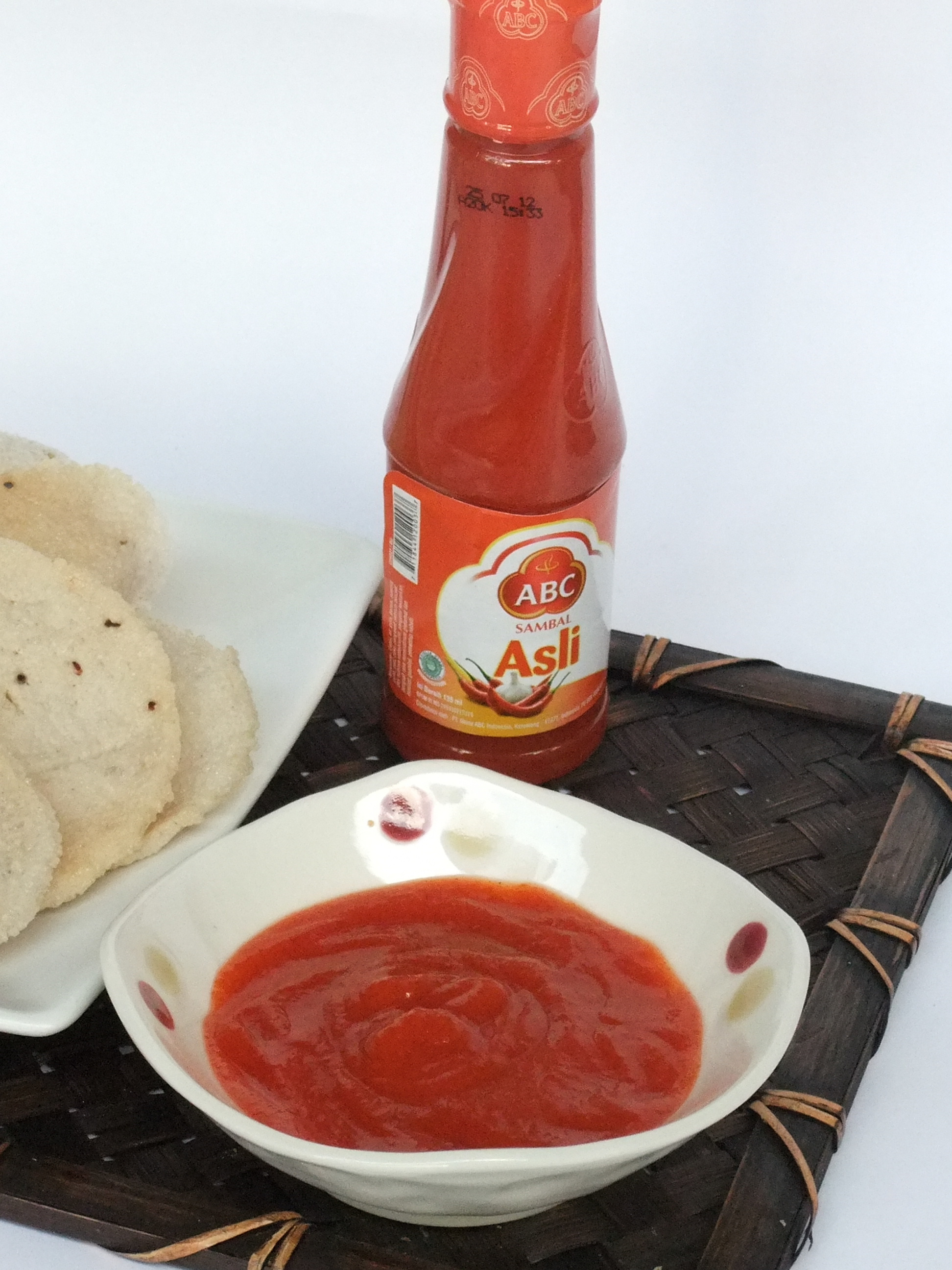
Sambal Asli ABC, a Heinz ABC product in Indonesia

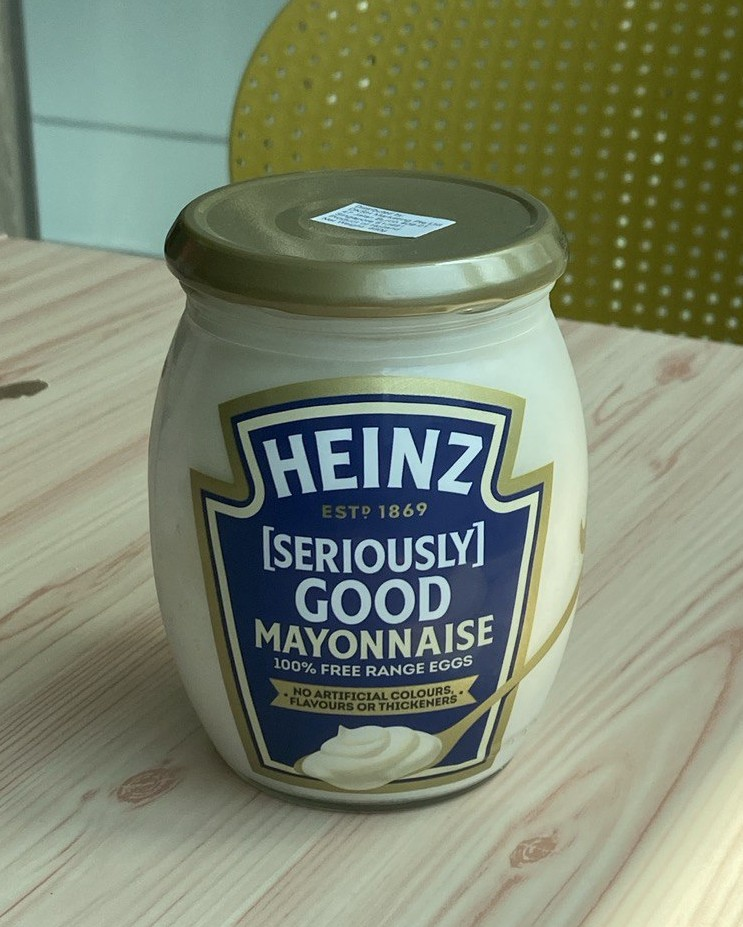
Heinz mayo produced in Netherlands is imported and sold in major Singapore supermarket

H. J. Heinz Company entered Indonesia in 1999, when it acquired 65 percent share of PT. ABC Central Food, for US$70 million, and formed PT. Heinz ABC Indonesia. The company is based in Jakarta, and manufactures sauces, condiments, juices and syrups.

Serving demand from Indonesia's large population and growing economy, in the early 21st century PT. Heinz ABC Indonesia is the largest Heinz's business in Asia, and one of the largest in the world. It employs 3000 employees, has 3 production facilities, 8 packing facilities, and an extensive distribution network in Java and other parts of Indonesia. Their leading products are Syrup ABC (fruit syrup), Kecap ABC (sweet soy sauce), and Sambal ABC (hot chili sauce).

=== Netherlands ===
Heinz sells many products in the Netherlands; the Elst factory in Gelderland is the primary production facility for Heinz sauces for Western Europe. In 2006, production of both HP Sauce and Daddies was transferred from Birmingham, West Midlands to Elst as a result of the acquisition of HP Foods and the subsequent closure of the Aston factory. Subsequently, Heinz suffered severe supply issues for the ex-HP Foods brands as the Elst factory struggled to integrate production, resulting in significant negative coverage from UK retailers. Heinz was forced to begin bottling sauce in Spain, shipping ready-made sauce from Elst, to get product back into supply. Netherlands factories are also responsible for producing signature sauces such as mayonnaise and ketchup for its Southeast Asian market.

=== United Kingdom ===
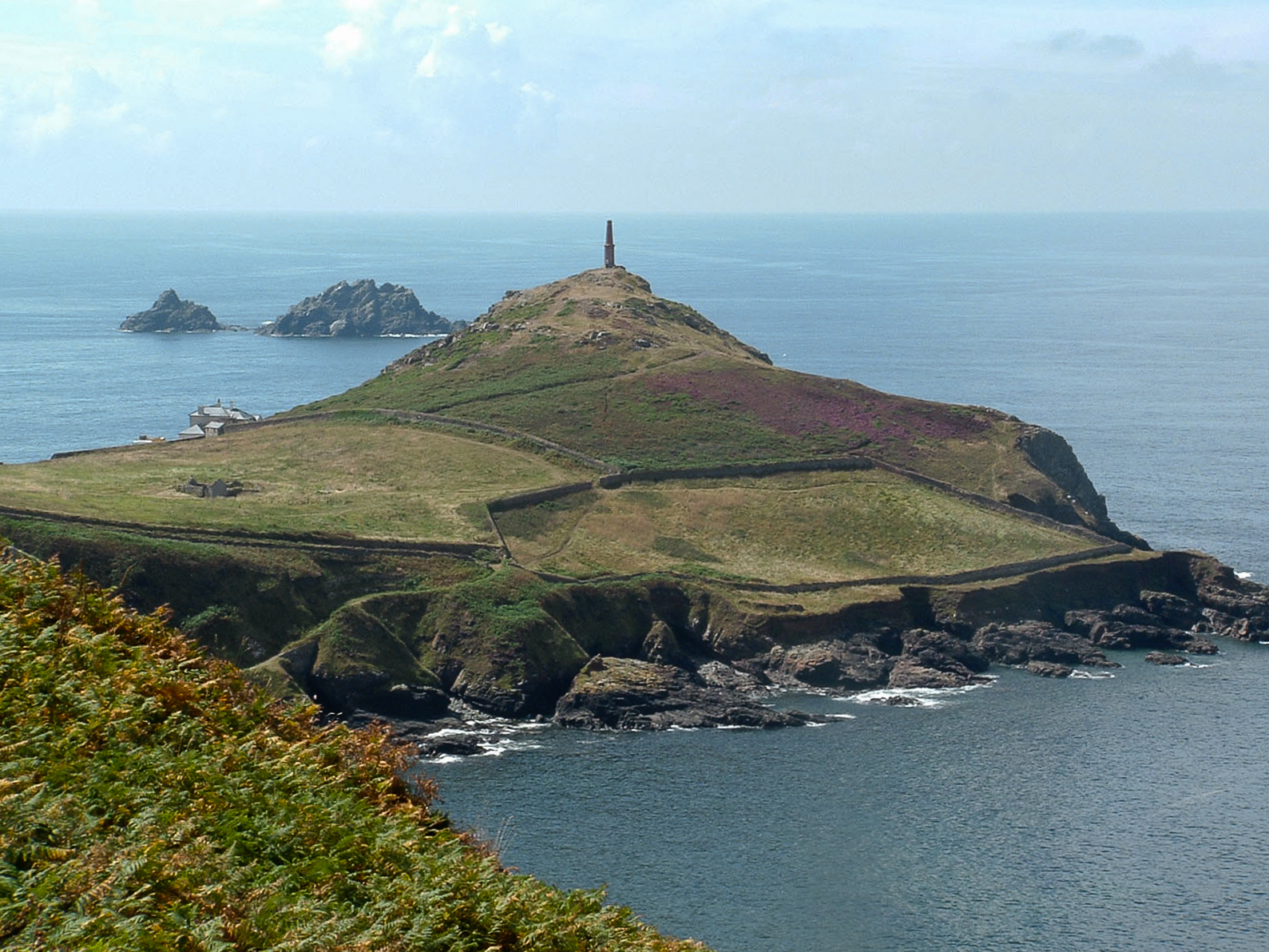
The Heinz Monument (the 1864 chimney of the former Cape Cornwall Mine, visible in the centre) commemorates the purchase of Cape Cornwall for the nation by H. J. Heinz Company. The ruins of St. Helens Oratory can be seen on the left, with the two offshore rocks called The Brisons in the distance

After opening its first overseas office in London in 1896, the company opened its first UK factory in Peckham, south London in 1905. This was followed by a factory at Harlesden, north-west London in 1919. Bombed twice in World War II, this factory remained in production until 2000. Production was started at a former munitions factory at Standish near Wigan in 1946, before the new factory at Kitt Green, near Wigan, opened in 1959. Heinz also had an infant food factory in Kendal, Cumbria. The site specialized in baby milks, previously under the brand of Farley's, but then manufactured under the name Heinz Nurture.

Heinz produces oriental foods sold under the Amoy brand, once used under license from Ajinomoto Co. Inc., Tokyo, Japan. In 2018, Amoy Food was sold to the new owners, CITIC Capital Asian Foods Holdings Ltd.

In July 2001, the Food Standards Agency of the Government of the United Kingdom found Heinz canned baked beans products to be contaminated with the hormone disruptor bisphenol.

In 2013, the Kitt Green facility was listed as one among the world's five largest manufacturing units by the Discovery Channel (the list comprised Reliance's Jamnagar Refinery, Volkswagen's car plant, Kitt Green Foods plant, NASA's Kennedy Space Center and POSCO's steel plant). It was Europe's largest food factory and supplied more than 1 billion cans every year.

=== China ===
On February 22, 2013, Sanquan Food, a Chinese frozen food company, signed a contract to purchase LongFong Food, a subsidiary of Heinz Company in China. With this sale, Heinz (China) will focus on infant foods and sauces in emerging markets such as China. Heinz Hong Kong Limited is the regional office serving for operations in Hong Kong, China and Taiwan.

=== New Zealand ===
Heinz produces frozen vegetables for export for the New Zealand and Australian market. They also produce mayonnaise and other sauces for the New Zealand and Australian market. Most products sold in New Zealand are sold under the brand name "Watties".

== See also ==
- Heinz Sandwich Spread
- Heinz pickle pin
