= H. J. Heinz, Wigan =

Food manufacturing plant in Kitt Green, Wigan, England

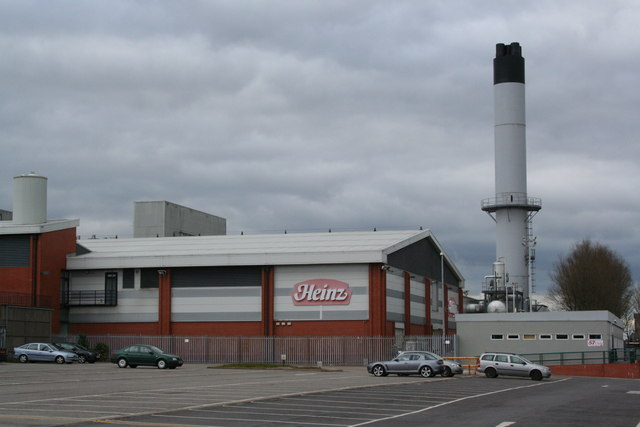
- Heinz factory in Kitt Green
- Built: 21 May 1959
- Location: Kitt Green, Wigan
- Coordinates: 53°33′6″N 2°40′59″W
- Industry: Food processing
- Employees: 650-700
- Area: 55 acres (22 ha)
- Owner: H. J. Heinz Company

The H. J. Heinz, Wigan factory is a food manufacturing plant owned by H. J. Heinz Company, based in Kitt Green, Orrell, Wigan in Greater Manchester, England. It is one of the largest food processing plants in Europe and the largest H. J. Heinz facility in the world. It produces over one billion cans of food annually and employs around 850 people.

== Background ==
H. J. Heinz varieties first went on sale in Fortnum & Mason in 1886. After World War I, with a headquarters established in Hayes, London, Heinz started exporting baked beans, canned spaghetti and tomato ketchup to the United Kingdom. Heinz opened its first UK production facility in Harlesden in the 1920s. By 1933 nearly all Heinz products sold in the UK were manufactured domestically. During World War II the Harlesden facility was bombed twice. To help increase food production after the war, Heinz took over a former munitions factory in 1946 at Standish near Wigan. Heinz LTD grew sixfold between 1945 and 1956, and due to this increased demand it needed a new large manufacturing plant in the UK.

== Opening ==
Needing a new consolidated factory outside London, the site in Northwest England was chosen due to its ease of access to the agricultural industry, high-quality water supply, highly skilled local workforce and good transport links. The site had good rail and road connections to the Atlantic Ocean (Liverpool Docks) and Europe via the North Sea, which allow for easy and low-cost access to both raw products and the export of manufactured processed food.

The Kitt Green factory was opened on 21 May 1959 by the Lord Chancellor, the Rt. Hon. David Maxwell Fyfe, 1st Earl of Kilmuir. A few weeks later it was visited by Queen Elizabeth The Queen Mother on 24 June 1959.

== Operations ==
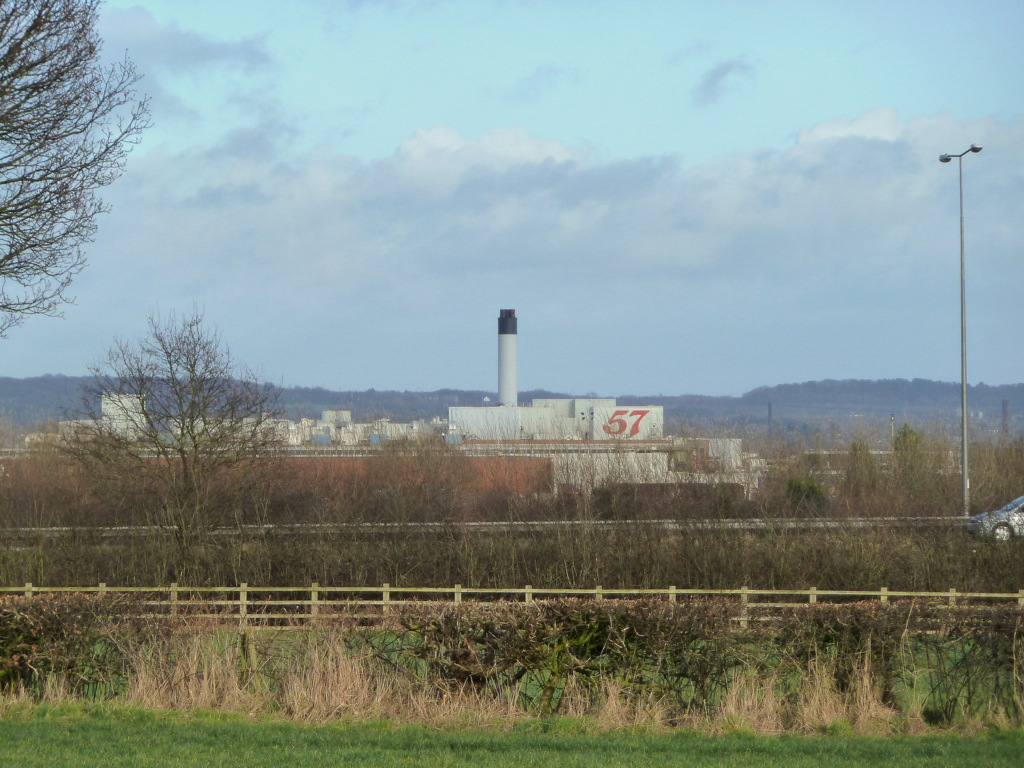
The factory from Gathurst Road

The chosen 55-acre (22 ha) site allowed easy expansion. By the 1980s, the factory employed around 3,000 people, and during the decade was converted to high-speed automation. It had taken over the production of all UK products from Harlesden except Heinz Tomato Ketchup. After Harlesden closed in 2000, ketchup production was moved to Holland. A steam plant with a capacity of 140 tonnes per hour was installed in 2005, one of the largest of these types of installations in the UK.

The factory celebrated its 50th anniversary in 2009, with a visit by HM Queen Elizabeth II and Prince Philip, Duke of Edinburgh who also opened a new packaging hall. In 2013, the factory was listed by Discovery Channel as one of the world's top five manufacturing units, alongside: Reliance's Jamnagar Refinery; Volkswagen's car plant; NASA's Kennedy Space Center; POSCO's steel plant.

As of 2019, the factory employs 850 people. It makes 1.5–3 million cans of Heinz Baked Beans per day and more than 1.3 billion cans of food a year, which is around 383 thousand tonnes (377,000 long tons) annually. It is one of the largest food processing plants in Europe and the largest of Heinz's factories around the world.

Investment in the site has increased since Heinz's merger with Kraft in 2015. A total of £113.6 million was invested between the merger and August 2018, including £20 million for modernising the filling and packing operations in the plant.

== Future ==
In January 2021, Kraft Heinz began running trials moving goods by freight trains to their Wigan distribution centre. The aim of the trials is to reduce the company's long-term carbon footprint in comparison to road transport.
