= HP Foods =

British food company

HP Foods Limited
- Type: Private
- Industry: Food
- Founded: 1875 in Aston, Birmingham
- Founder: Edwin Samson Moore
- Headquarters: Hayes, London, United Kingdom
- Area served: Europe
- Products: HP Sauce, Daddies sauces, Lea & Perrins Worcestershire sauce
- Owner: The Kraft Heinz Company
- Parent: H. J. Heinz Company
- Divisions: HP Foods, Amoy Food UK, Lea & Perrins
- Website: hpsauce.co.uk

HP Foods Limited is a British food company, best known as the producer of the HP, Lea & Perrins, and Daddies sauce brands. It was also the UK licensee, from Heinz, of Chinese food and condiment brand Amoy Food.

Formerly the Midlands Vinegar Company and Smedley HP Foods Limited, it was acquired by Imperial Foods, a division of Imperial Group. Edward Eastwood and his nephew Edwin Samson Moore established the Midland Vinegar Company at Aston, Birmingham in 1875.

In 1939, the Birmingham Gazette noted that H.P. Sauce Ltd. also produced H.P. Tomato Ketchup, H.P. Salad Cream, H.P. Mayonnaise and the sweet pickle, Pickante. The company's wholly owned subsidiaries included the Midland Vinegar Co., F.G. Garton & Co., Mallors (Worcester Sauce), (Note: Spelled Mellor's in another source.) Tower Yeast Company, and Lea and Perrins.

HP Foods Ltd was retained by Imperial's parent company Hanson plc even after the demerger of the Imperial Group. It was sold to Groupe Danone SA in 1988 for £199 million. It was sold by Danone to Heinz in June 2005 for £470 million. However, in October of that year the takeover was referred by the UK's Office of Fair Trading to the Competition Commission. After a review the Competition Commission approved the takeover and Heinz started integrating this new company into the business.

In 2007, the Aston factory was demolished, and production of HP and Daddies sauce brands was moved to the Netherlands. Bottling of Lea & Perrins Worcestershire sauce was returned to Worcester, having been moved in 2005 to the Aston factory. During this time, the sauce continued to be manufactured but not bottled at the Midlands Road site.

== See also ==
- Brown sauce
- Sweet chili sauce
- Worcestershire sauce
- Tomato ketchup
