= Daddies =

Brand of brown sauce and tomato ketchup

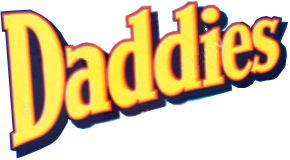
- Product type: Sauce
- Current owner: Kraft Heinz (2005–pres.)
- Produced by: Heinz
- Country: United Kingdom
- Introduced: 1904; 122 years ago Birmingham, England
- Markets: Europe
- Previous owners: HP Foods

Daddies is a brand of ketchup and brown sauce in the United Kingdom.

== History ==
The brown sauce product, known as "Daddies Sauce", was launched in 1904, and the ketchup was launched in 1930. The brand is owned by the H. J. Heinz Company; it was bought as part of the acquisition of HP Foods from previous owner Groupe Danone in 2005. Production of Daddies was moved to Poland.

In 1899, Edwin Samson Moore, the owner of the Midland Vinegar Company in Aston Cross, Birmingham went to see one of his customers who owed him a debt for vinegar. The man was Frederick Gibson Garton, a Nottingham grocer who had a small sauce factory at the rear of his premises. The 2013 book HP Sauce My Ancestors' Legacy tells the story of how Moore saw a sauce brewing in the back copper while visiting Garton. Garton explained it was his new sauce called Daddies Sauce. Moore cancelled the debt and paid Garton £150 (around £16665 in today's money) for the recipe of his sauces and chutneys which included Daddies Sauce and HP Sauce.

== See also ==
- List of sauces
