= Heinz Baked Beans =

Canned food

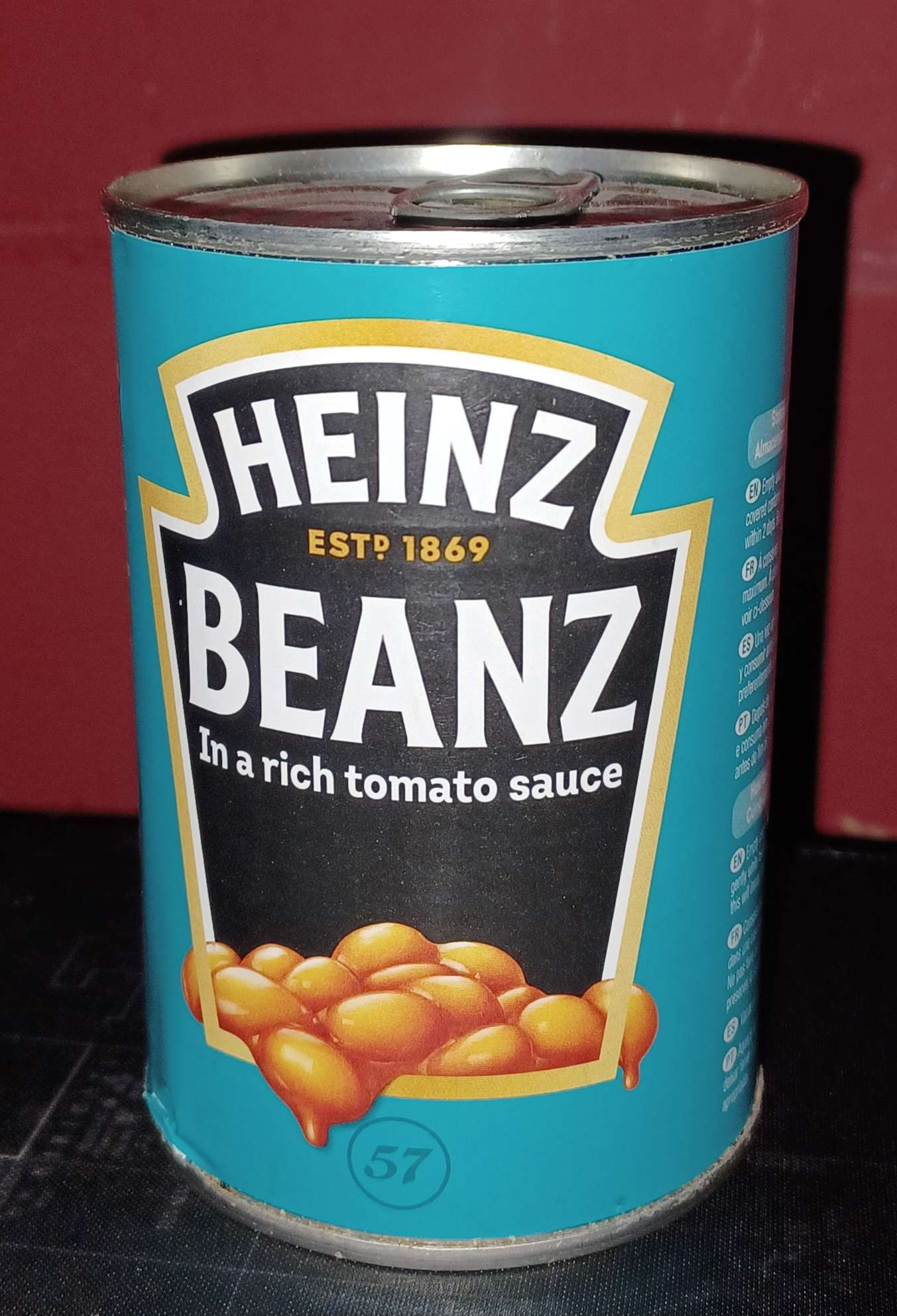
A can of Heinz Baked Beans

Heinz Baked Beans are a brand of baked beans produced by the H. J. Heinz Company. In the United Kingdom, they are sold as Heinz Beanz.

== History ==
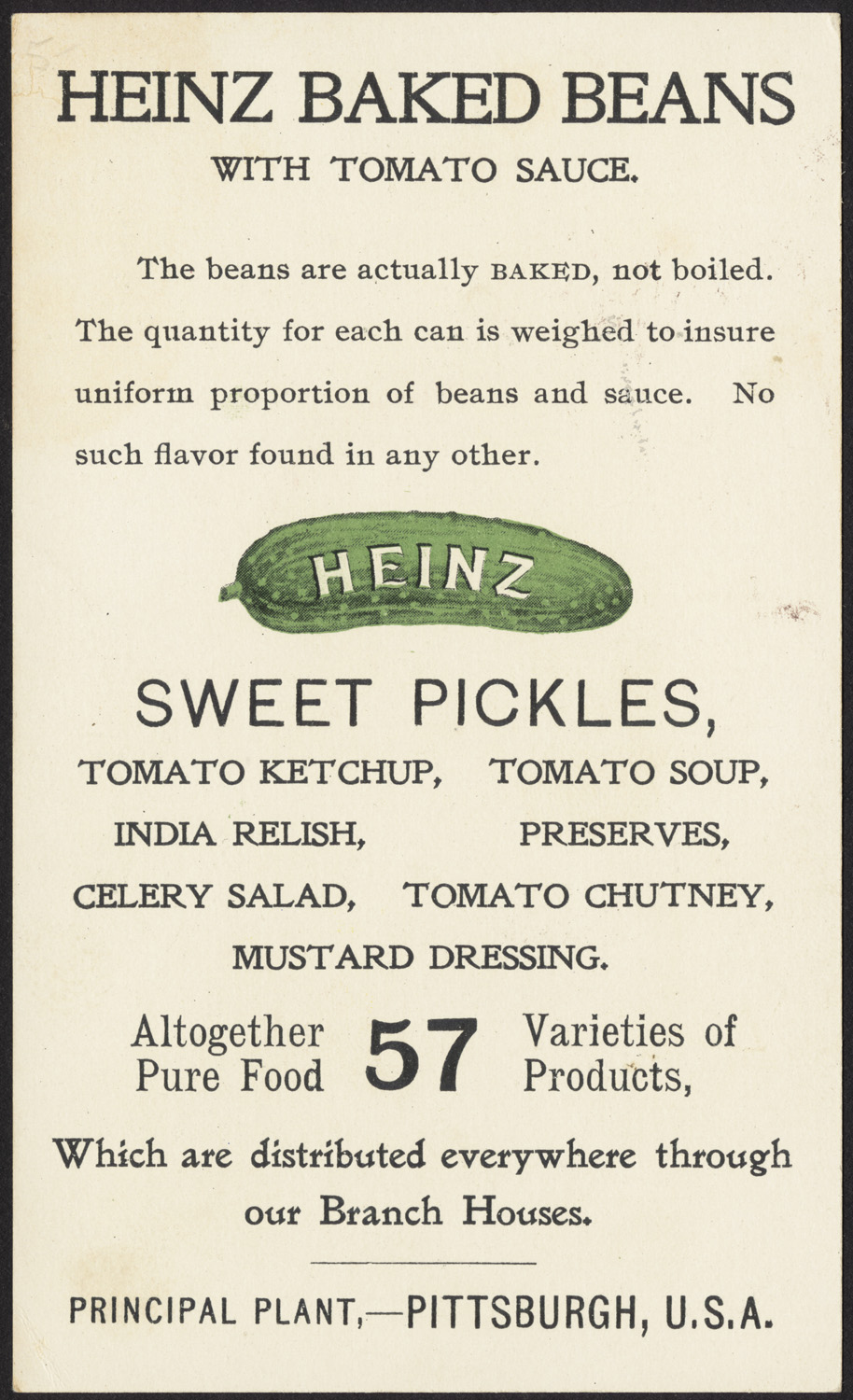
19th-century trade card promoting Heinz Baked Beans

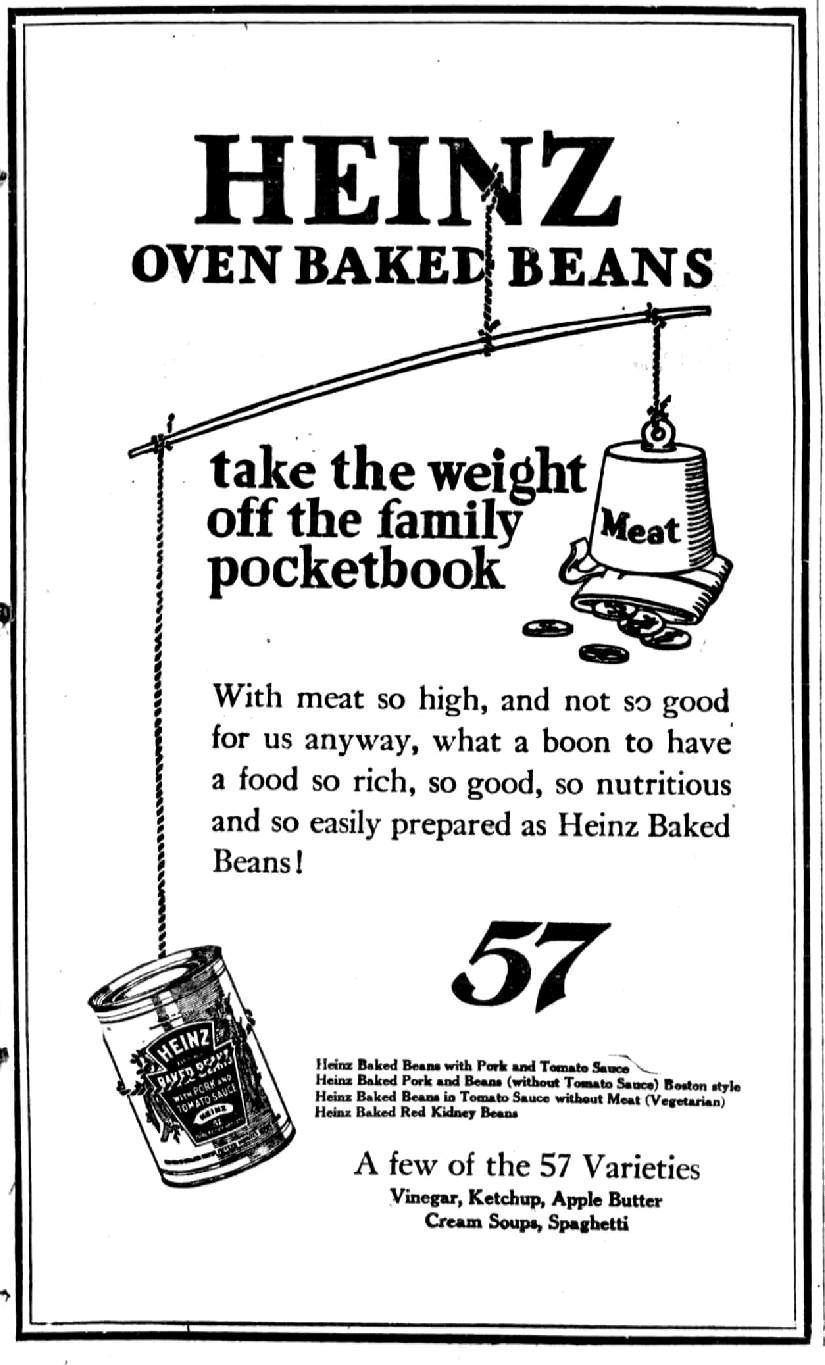
Advertisement for Heinz Baked Beans in the New York Evening World (1919)

The Heinz company first began selling baked beans in 1895. They were introduced to the United Kingdom in 1901, where they have since become a staple. The beans were initially imported from the United States, but began being produced at a new plant in Harlesden, London, in 1928. Heinz now sells relatively few beans in the US, lagging behind brands such as Bush's.

Between 1941 and 1948, the British Ministry of Food classified Heinz Baked Beans as an "essential food" as part of its wartime rationing system.

In 1967, Heinz launched an advertising campaign with the slogan "Beanz Meanz Heinz". The phrase was created by advertising executive Maurice Drake and went on to become one of the best-known advertising slogans in the United Kingdom. Drake later said the slogan was "written over two pints of beer in The Victoria pub in Mornington Crescent".

In 1998, Heinz Baked Beans was voted one of 12 top brands of the millennium in the United Kingdom.

The beans were rebranded as "Heinz Baked Beanz" in the United Kingdom in 2004, then again rebranded as "Heinz Beanz" in 2008, dropping the word "Baked", as the original title was "a bit of a mouthful to pronounce", according to the company.

As of 2012, the Heinz factory in Kitt Green was one of the largest food factories in Europe, and produced more than one billion cans of food every year.

In 2016, Heinz's advertising campaign featuring people using empty beans cans as musical instruments was banned by the Advertising Standards Authority on safety grounds.

In 2001, the British Food Standards Agency examined canned goods for the endocrine disruptor bisphenol A (BPA) and found traces in 38 of 62 samples. Heinz is one of the companies that says it uses BPA. BPA forms part of the membrane that lines the cans. The Heinz company put out a statement – "Although UK and European food authorities have stated that minute levels of BPA in can coatings are safe, Heinz remains committed to moving to alternatives." By 2019, Heinz UK claimed to have switched to non-BPA cans for most of its products such as most popular varieties of beans.

== Manufacture outside of the UK ==
Heinz Beans are manufactured and/or distributed in several Commonwealth countries outside of the UK.

=== Canada ===
Heinz tinned beans have been manufactured in Canada for more than 100 years. The "Heinz Beans Original in Tomato Sauce" tin looks similar to the British version but has a bit of a different recipe. Several additional styles of Heinz beans are manufactured in Canada, including "British Style" and a version made with maple syrup.

=== New Zealand ===
Heinz Beans "English Recipe" are manufactured in New Zealand. Beans from New Zealand are also sold in Malaysia.

== Production method ==
Heinz baked beans

Heinz Baked Beans are produced by sealing raw haricot beans and tomato sauce in cans, which are then placed in large pressure cookers. This gives the sauce its thick consistency and ensures a long shelf life for the product.

A standard 415g can contains an average of 465 beans.

== Beanz Museum ==
Heinz opened the Beanz Museum as a pop-up exhibit in Covent Garden, London, between 30 August and 1 September 2019. It contained an interactive immersive exhibit about the history of Heinz Baked Beans to mark the company's 150th anniversary.
