= Mo Drake =

British advertising executive (1928–2021)

Maurice Drake
- Drake holding a can of Heinz Baked Beans in 2018
- Born: Maurice Drake; 20 May 1928; Bromley-by-Bow, London, England
- Died: 22 August 2021 (aged 93)
- Occupation: Advertising executive
- Known for: Producing the slogan "Beanz Meanz Heinz" for Heinz Baked Beans
- Spouse: Georgina Taylor (m. 1952, died)
- Children: 4

Maurice Drake (20 May 1928 – 22 August 2021) was a British advertising executive. He missed several years of education due to the Second World War and left school at the age of 14. Drake found work as a filing clerk at an advertising agency before carrying out national service with the Royal Air Force. Upon completion of his military service, he joined public relations firm Armstrong Warden.

Drake left the industry briefly in the 1950s to become a jokewriter, working closely with Bob Monkhouse. He returned to advertising in 1959 and enjoyed success at Young & Rubicam. Drake used his connections in the entertainment industry to convince celebrities, including Bruce Forsyth and Frank Muir, to front his advertisements. He was behind campaigns for Maxwell House, Cadbury, Flora and Wall's (for whom he developed the "Just One Cornetto" campaign). His most successful slogan was "Beanz Meanz Heinz" which he devised in 1967 and remained in use almost continually for 30 years. He retired in the mid-1980s but continued to lecture in advertising.

== Early life and career ==
Maurice Drake, known as Mo, was born in Bromley-by-Bow, London, on 20 May 1928 to Thomas and Sarah Jane Drake, a working-class family. When Drake was three years old, the family moved to Ilford. Drake passed his eleven-plus examination but was prevented from attending grammar school by the Second World War. He first attended a secondary school at the age of 14 but left after a few months. Despite disruption to his formal education, Drake was a keen reader, particularly of Shakespeare.

After leaving school Drake joined the Thames advertising agency as a filing clerk. He left the company at the age of 17 to carry out his national service with the Royal Air Force. Upon completing his national service, Drake joined public relations firm Armstrong Warden. Though it was not his main role he proved so skillful at writing publicity releases that he was appointed to a full-time role as a copywriter.

Drake left his job to work with former colleague Jack Potter as joke writers. Potter and Drake submitted jokes to Bob Monkhouse, who was then a scriptwriter at the BBC. Monkhouse paid them £10 for their first submissions and afterwards served as their de facto agent. Drake and Potter's jokes were used by Arthur Haynes, Bruce Forsyth and Nicholas Parsons. Monkhouse introduced Drake to several key figures in the entertainment industry, that proved of help to his later career.

== Advertising ==
Drake later rejoined Armstrong Warden and, in 1959, joined another agency, Young & Rubicam. He often contacted comedians he had written for to appear in his advertisements. He convinced Forsyth to appear in a Maxwell House coffee advertisement after the role was turned down by Tommy Cooper, Groucho Marx and Bob Hope (who had refused to take part unless he was given use of a Rolls-Royce). He also persuaded Frank Muir to sing "Everyone's a Fruit and Nut Case" on an advertisement for Cadbury's Fruit and Nut bar. Cadbury was Drake's favourite client and another of his lines promoting Fruit and Nut was "The nuts are so nutritious, the fruit is so fruiticious and connoisseurs of chocolate pronounce it quite delicious". His favourite Cadbury campaign was for their Dairy Milk bar, with the slogan "award yourself the CDM". This was an allusion to the three-letter acronyms common for awards in the British honours system. Drake's campaign encouraged the public to nominate people for the "CDM" [Cadbury's Dairy Milk] award.

Drake was commissioned in 1967 to produce a campaign for Heinz Baked Beans, whose dominance in the market was being threatened by the introduction of supermarket own-brand baked beans. Drake was at this time deputy creative director at Young & Rubicam. Having failed, after several weeks, to come up with an idea he and his team went to the Victoria pub in Camden. As he was drinking his second pint of beer he was struck with the idea for the slogan "Beanz Meanz Heinz". Drake noted "I was just scribbling on my pad when it dawned on me that you could end Beans with a 'z', as 'Heinz' did". His subsequent campaign included the line "A million housewives every day pick up a tin of beans and say 'Beanz Meanz Heinz'" set to a tune by Johnny Johnston. The figure used here by Drake was actually an understatement, the real figure being 1.75 million but Drake considered his line to be more suited to music.

Drake's slogan led to increased sales and was used almost continuously by Heinz for 30 years, being dropped only briefly in 1993–1996 for "Heinz Buildz Britz" developed by advertising agency BMP. In 2003 the company considered replacing the slogan but could find no adequate replacement. In 2004 the company capitalised on the success of Drake's original slogan by changing their on-product branding to "Heinz Beanz", which it remains. "Beanz Meanz Heinz" was voted the most popular advertising slogan of all time in 1999 and in 2000 came top in a ranking of 84 entrants in the Advertising Hall of Fame. The slogan was dropped in 2008 as Heinz wanted their name to be linked with a wider range of products than just beans. In 2017, to celebrate the 50th anniversary of the slogan, the company released 50 special edition tins (priced at £10 each) signed by Drake.

Drake later left Young & Rubicam to become creative director at Grey Advertising and at Lintas. During this time his team developed the "Just One Cornetto" slogan for Wall's ice cream and "Flora, the Margarine for Men" for the vegetable-based spread. Drake retired in the mid-1980s.

== Personal life and retirement ==
In retirement Drake lectured widely, including a regular seminar at Trinity College, Oxford. He was dismissive of modern advertising strategies, complaining that modern writers were more concerned with the use of special effects than creating long-lasting campaigns that remained in the public consciousness: "Why bother using your imagination when you can spend £100,000 on special effects?".

Drake married Georgina Taylor in 1952. They had met whilst Drake was visiting his friend, who was a patient in a tuberculosis hospital; Taylor was a friend of the patient's girlfriend. Drake and Taylor had three daughters and a son. In his private life Drake was a fan of jazz music and played the guitar. In later life he lived in a care home in Brighton. He died, a widower, on 22 August 2021.
