= HP Sauce =

British brown sauce

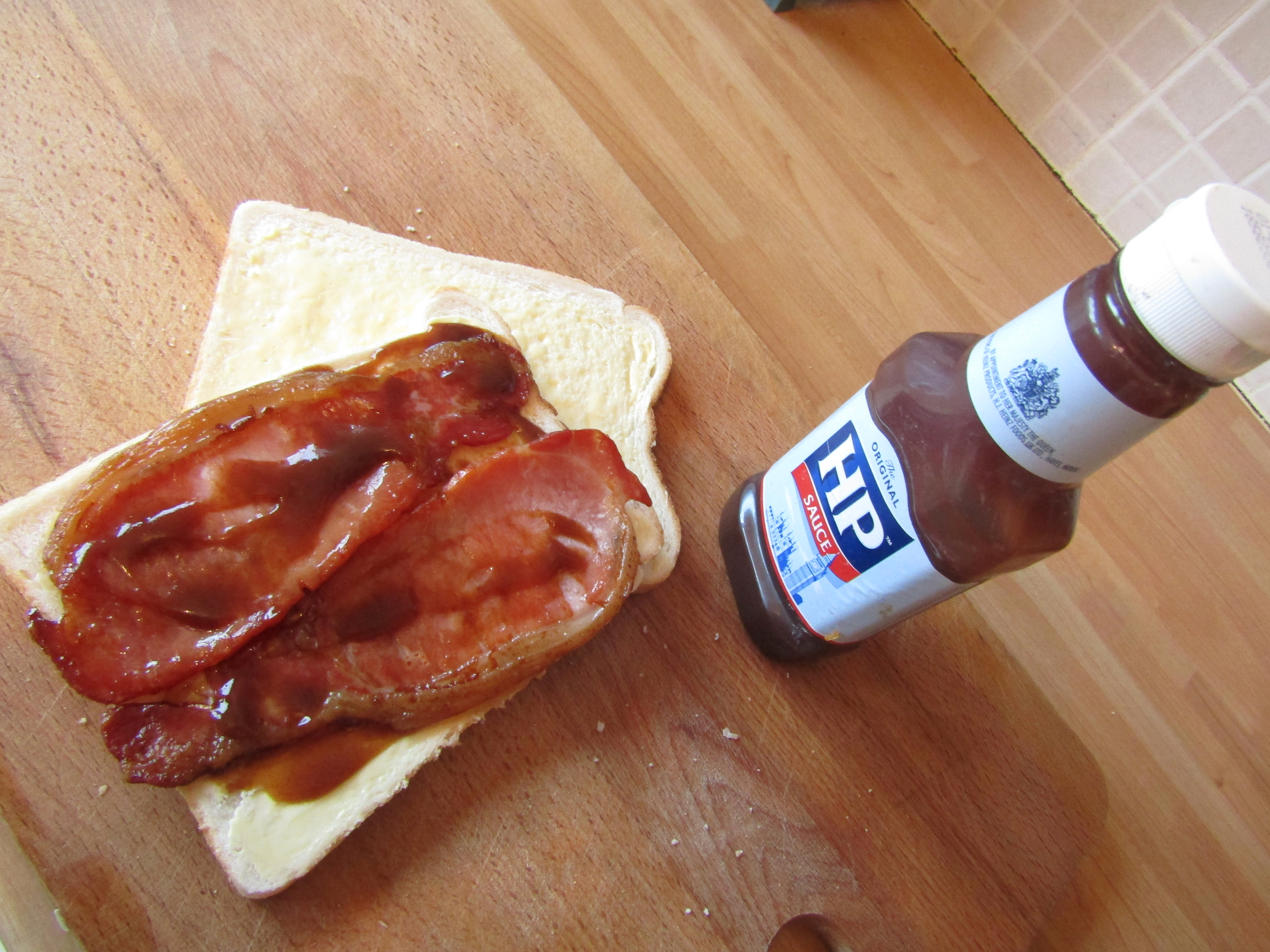
- HP Sauce on a bacon sandwich
- Product type: Brown sauce
- Current owner: Kraft Heinz (2005–present)
- Produced by: Heinz
- Introduced: 1895; 131 years ago
- Markets: United Kingdom, Europe, Canada, Australia
- Previous owners: Frederick Gibson Garton (1895–1903); HP Foods (1903–2005)
- Website: hpsauce.co.uk

HP Sauce is a British brown sauce, the main ingredients of which are tomatoes, malt vinegar, and molasses. It was named after London's Houses of Parliament. After making its first appearance on British dinner tables in the late 19th century, HP Sauce went on to become an icon of British culture. It was the best-selling brand of brown sauce in the UK in 2005, with 73.8% of the retail market. The sauce was originally produced in the United Kingdom, but is now made by Heinz in the Netherlands.

HP Sauce has a tomato base, blended with malt vinegar and spirit vinegar, sugars (molasses, glucose-fructose syrup, sugar), dates, cornflour, rye flour, salt, spices, and tamarind. It is used as a condiment with hot and cold savoury food, and as an ingredient in soups and stews.

The picture on the front of the bottle is a selection of London landmarks including the Queen Elizabeth Tower, the Palace of Westminster, and Westminster Bridge.

== History ==
Frederick Gibson Garton had a grocers and provisions shop on Milton Street, in Nottingham. He used this recipe for the brown sauce in his pickles and sauce factory in New Basford. This was located at the rear of his home in Sandon Street. Its ingredients included vinegar, water, tomato puree, garlic, tamarind, ground mace, cloves, ginger, shallots, cayenne pepper, raisins, soy, flour and salt. Garton registered the name H.P. Sauce in 1895, choosing it because he had heard a rumour that a restaurant in the Houses of Parliament had begun serving it. The sauce bottle labels carried a picture of the Houses of Parliament. This was not his only product; he also made various other sauces.

In 1899, he was unable to settle a debt with his vinegar suppliers, the Midland Vinegar Company of Aston Cross, Birmingham. Edwin Samson Moore of the vinegar company visited his Nottingham premises to settle the matter. The outcome was that Garton sold the name and recipe for HP Sauce for £150. He also had to agree to keep out of the sauce and pickles business. The name of GARTON remained on the bottles of HP sauce for many years afterwards but it was The Midland Vinegar Company who profited from the huge sales that were generated. Today HP and Daddies are the two most popular national brands of brown sauce.

Since 1903 the bottle labels have carried a picture of the Houses of Parliament.

In the United Kingdom, HP Sauce became informally known as "Wilson's gravy" in the 1960s and 1970s. Said to be because Mary Wilson, the wife of Prime Minister Harold Wilson, gave an interview to The Sunday Times, in which she said: "If Harold has a fault, it is that he will drown everything with HP Sauce.," the actual source was probably a long-running column called Mrs Wilson's Diary in the satirical magazine Private Eye. Mary Wilson later said that Harold far preferred Worcestershire sauce.

=== Heinz takeover ===
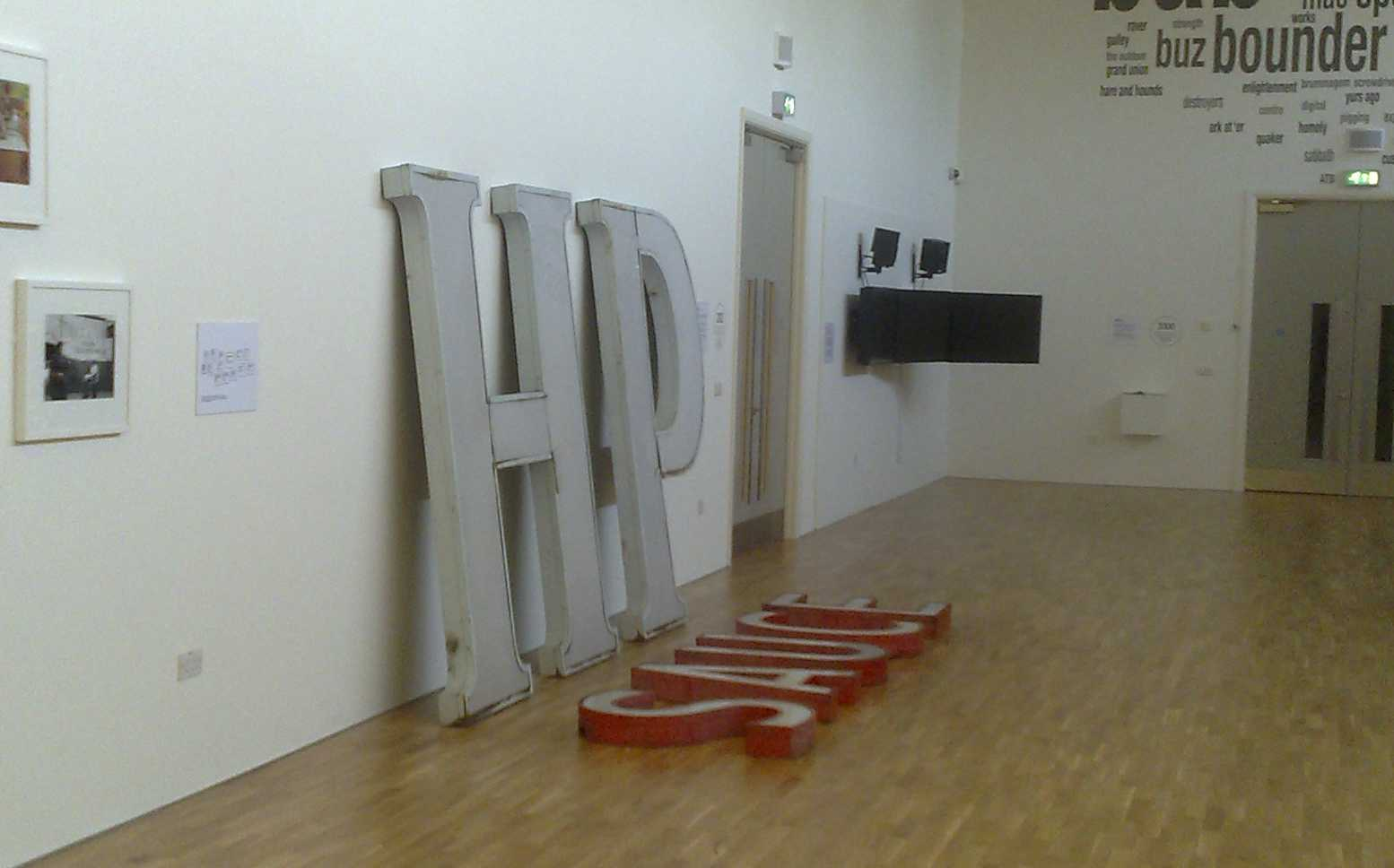
Signage from the defunct factory in Aston, exhibited at Birmingham's mac gallery in June 2010

The brand passed from the Midlands Vinegar Company to Smedley HP Foods Limited, which was subsequently acquired by a division of Imperial Tobacco, before being sold to the French Groupe Danone SA in 1998 for £199 million.

In June 2005, Heinz purchased the parent company, HP Foods, from Danone. In October of that year the United Kingdom Office of Fair Trading referred the takeover to the Competition Commission, which approved the £440 million acquisition in April 2006.

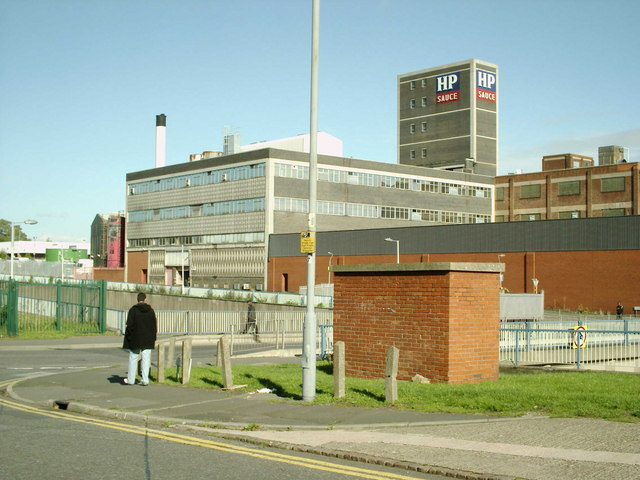
The HP Sauce factory in 2006

In May 2006, Heinz announced plans to switch production of HP Sauce from Aston in Birmingham to its European sauces facility in Elst, Netherlands, only weeks after HP launched a campaign to "Save the Proper British Cafe". The announcement caused backlash and prompted a call to boycott Heinz products. The move, resulting in the loss of approximately 125 jobs at the Aston factory, was criticised by politicians and union officials, especially as the owner still wanted to use the image of the House of Commons on its bottles. In the same month, local Labour MP Khalid Mahmood brandished a bottle of HP Sauce during Prime Minister's Questions in the House of Commons as part of a protest against the Heinz move. He also made reference to the sauce's popularity with the former Labour Prime Minister Harold Wilson. These plans were confirmed on 23 August 2006 and the factory at Aston ceased production on 16 March 2007. A week later a "wake" was held at the location of the factory.

The factory was demolished in the summer of 2007.

The six-acre Aston site was purchased by developer Chancerygate in 2007 at £800,000 per acre; they subsequently sold it for half that price and it now houses a distribution warehouse for East End Foods.

== Varieties ==
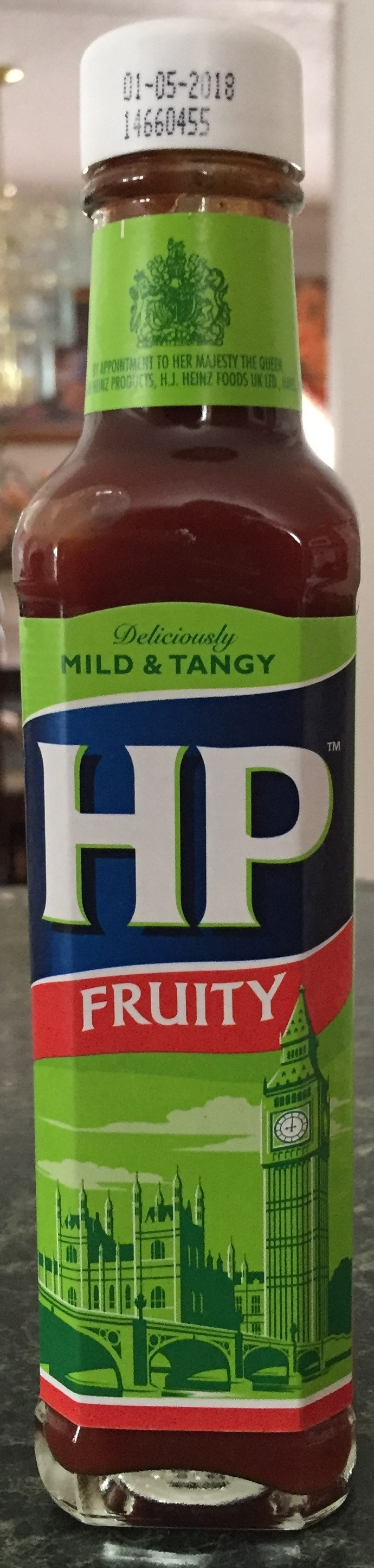
A bottle of Fruity HP Sauce

HP Sauce is available in a range of formats and sizes, including the iconic 9 oz/255 g glass bottle, plastic squeeze bottle, and TopDown bottle.

- HP Fruity is a milder version of the Original brown sauce, using a blend of fruits including oranges and mango to give a milder, tangier taste. This variety has been renamed "HP Chicken & Rib" in Canada and the US (though it can be found in some stores with the original name).
- HP Bold is a spicier variant in Canada.
- HP BBQ Sauce is a range of barbecue sauces, and is the UK's best selling barbecue sauce product.
- Since 2011, the original HP sauce has been manufactured with a new reduced-sodium recipe.
