= Heinz pickle pin =

Heinz advertising item

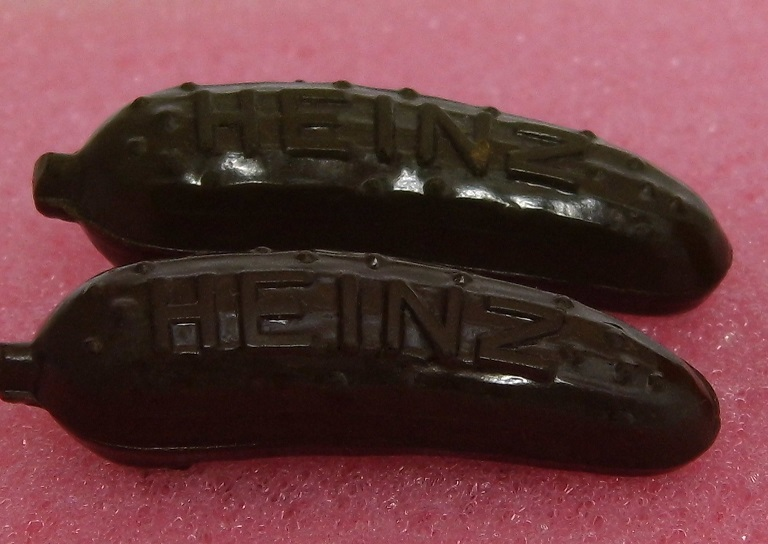
Heinz pickle pins

The Heinz pickle pin is an advertising item from the H. J. Heinz Company, being a small green pin made in the shape of a pickle. Being continuously offered for more than a century, and with more than 100 million pins produced over the years, it is both one of the longest-running and most successful promotions in history.

== Description ==
The Heinz pickle pin is very small, about 1 1/4 inches long 1.25 inches (3.2 cm), dark green, and fully "three-dimensional". The word HEINZ appears across the pickle in raised lettering. Because its "retro" design and long tradition are part of the appeal of the pickle pin, the design has changed relatively little in over a century of production. The few changes made have been relatively minor, with slight changes. The original pins were made from gutta-percha, a resin material which was a predecessor to modern plastics, and widely used in the 1800s for dental fillings, jewelry, and insulation for wiring. More recent pins use modern plastic. The pinback has changed from a simple wire which clasps around itself to a modern safety-pin back. The earliest pins had a wire pendant-like hook, allowing them to be hung from a string. Finally, the color has varied somewhat, from a realistic light green matte to the darker and shinier cucumber green used today.

== Origins ==
The pickle pin was envisioned by Heinz company founder H. J. Heinz, and predates even the "57 varieties" slogan for which Heinz is famous. The first Heinz pickle pins were given away at the 1893 Chicago World's Fair, also known as the World's Columbian Exposition, where a simple and inexpensive gift was thought to be necessary to draw visitors toward Heinz's relatively out-of-the-way booth in the second floor upper gallery of the Agricultural Building. Heinz believed that the public could help advertise the Heinz brand, writing in July 1892, "We keep our shingle out and then let the public blow our horn, and that counts." Promotions initially included pickle cards, pickle spoons, calendars, miniature watch chain charms in the shape of a pickle and souvenir books. The pickle charms were later adapted into pins.

At the time, this represented a new and different marketing concept. Heinz had some local boys scatter thousands of small white tokens around the fairground, with text offering the "finder" a free souvenir if they came to the Heinz booth. Their reward for stopping by was the opportunity to sample some food, and a complimentary promotional pickle pin. Heinz would distribute one million pickle pins by the fair's end.

Though undoubtedly a success, the actual impact of the pickle promotion on Heinz's business may have been slightly exaggerated. Literature at the time suggested that the pin saved Heinz from certain financial doom. A contemporary ad read spoke of Mr. Heinz: "A man who found himself in a pickle... was saved by one." Whether this is literally true is speculative, but the Heinz company has stuck with this line, even including the preceding quote in a 1999 press release. The success of the pickle pin promotion has achieved almost legendary status, including a story that several of the first-floor fair exhibitors sued Heinz for unfair competition, while the second floor vendors, swamped with guests because of the traffic Heinz drew, threw a gala dinner in his honor.

== The first century ==
After the 1893 Chicago World's Fair, Heinz continued distributing its pickle pins at events and by other means. Atlantic City's Iron Pier, opened in 1896, would in 1898 be purchased by Heinz and renamed Heinz Pier. The pier was a popular tourist attraction, featuring a museum, food samples, and free pickle pins. Heinz gave out pickle pins on the pier for nearly half a century and still do to this day at the nearby Atlantic City Historical Museum. Another venue where the Heinz pickle pins famously appeared was the 1939 New York World's Fair, where Heinz had an enormous exhibit building called the Heinz Dome. In 1982, at the World's Fair in Knoxville, Tennessee, Heinz once again gave out free pickle pins, but this time with a twist: the pins were distributed by a huge motorized ketchup bottle which moved freely around the fairgrounds. Visitors to Pittsburgh could acquire a pickle pin by taking the Heinz factory tour. Today, Heinz distributes the pins mostly one-by-one, by mail, for free to people who write in to their corporate address to request one. According to Heinz, they distribute just under a million pickle pins a year.

== Year 2000 ketchup variant ==
For the year 2000, the Heinz company decided to try something new. For the first time, an entirely different pin was produced. Rather than a pickle, the new pin was shaped like a red Heinz ketchup bottle, complete with painted white cap and keystone-shaped label. The first batch of ketchup pins made also feature a printed "2000" to denote its commemorative status. A total of one million ketchup pins were produced, which is roughly the equivalent of a year's worth of pickle pins.

== Spinoffs and other items ==
Besides the year 2000 ketchup pin, several similar items to the Heinz pickle pin have appeared over the years. A golden lapel pin in the shape of a pickle is a recent example, and Heinz has also made a pickle whistle, presumably as a fun item for kids too young to wear a pin (similar to the Oscar Mayer hot dog whistles distributed from the Wienermobile). In recent years, the amount of Heinz merchandise available has increased to the point that Heinz began operating its own retail store called the House of Heinz, located in Grove City, Pennsylvania.

== See also ==
- Lapel pin
- Pin-back button
- Promotional merchandise
- Wienermobile – a series of automobiles shaped like a hot dog on a bun which are used to promote and advertise Oscar Mayer products in the United States
