= Zydus Wellness =

Indian consumer goods company private limited

Zydus Wellness Limited
- Type: Public
- Traded as: NSE: ZYDUSWELL; BSE: 531335
- Industry: Fast-moving consumer goods
- Founded: 1994
- Headquarters: Ahmedabad, Gujarat, India
- Key people: Sharvil Patel (Chairman); Tarun Arora (CEO)
- Products: Glucon-D, Sugar Free, EverYuth, Complan, Nycil
- Revenue: ▲₹2,708.9 crore (US$280 million) (FY25)
- Net income: ▲₹346.9 crore (US$36 million) (FY25)
- Owner: Zydus Lifesciences (57.59%)
- Website: www.zyduswellness.com

Zydus Wellness (previously Carnation Nutra-Analogue Foods) is an Indian consumer goods company, which produces nutrition and skincare products. Headquartered in Ahmedabad, it is a subsidiary of the pharmaceutical company Zydus Lifesciences (formerly known as Cadila Healthcare). Its brands include Glucon-D, Sugar Free, EverYuth, Complan, and Nycil. As of 2021, the company operates three manufacturing plants, one in Gujarat and two in Sikkim.

== History ==
The company was founded in 1994 as Carnation Nutra-Analogue Foods, a producer of dairy substitutes and known for its margarine product Nutralite.

In 2006, Cadila Healthcare acquired a 14.96% stake in the company. Cadila's stake in the company increased to over 70% in 2008, after the merger of Cadila's consumer goods business, which included sugar substitute brand Sugar Free and EverYuth range of skincare products, into Carnation. The merged entity was then named as Zydus Wellness Limited in January 2009.

In 2009, the company began manufacturing men's grooming and skincare products. In 2011, Zydus Wellness launched its milk additive brand Actilife.

In 2017, Zydus Wellness developed stevia products as part of its sugar substitute business. In 2018, it launched its second sugar substitute brand called Sugarlite.

In January 2019, Zydus Wellness acquired a part of Heinz India's business for ₹4,595 crore (US$652.51 million), which included the health drink brand Complan, glucose-based energy drink additive Glucon D, talcum powder brand Nycil, and Sampriti Ghee. It also took over Heinz India's manufacturing facilities in Aligarh and Sitarganj.

In 2020, Zydus Wellness began making hand sanitisers and chocolate products.

In November 2024, Zydus Wellness acquired Naturell India for ₹390 crore. In August 2025, Zydus Wellness acquired UK-based Comfort Click for £239 million, its first overseas acquisition.
