= Complan =

British energy drinks manufacturer

Complan Foods is a British company that makes powdered milk energy drinks. It was acquired by Danone in 2011. In India the Complan brand is owned by the Zydus Wellness.

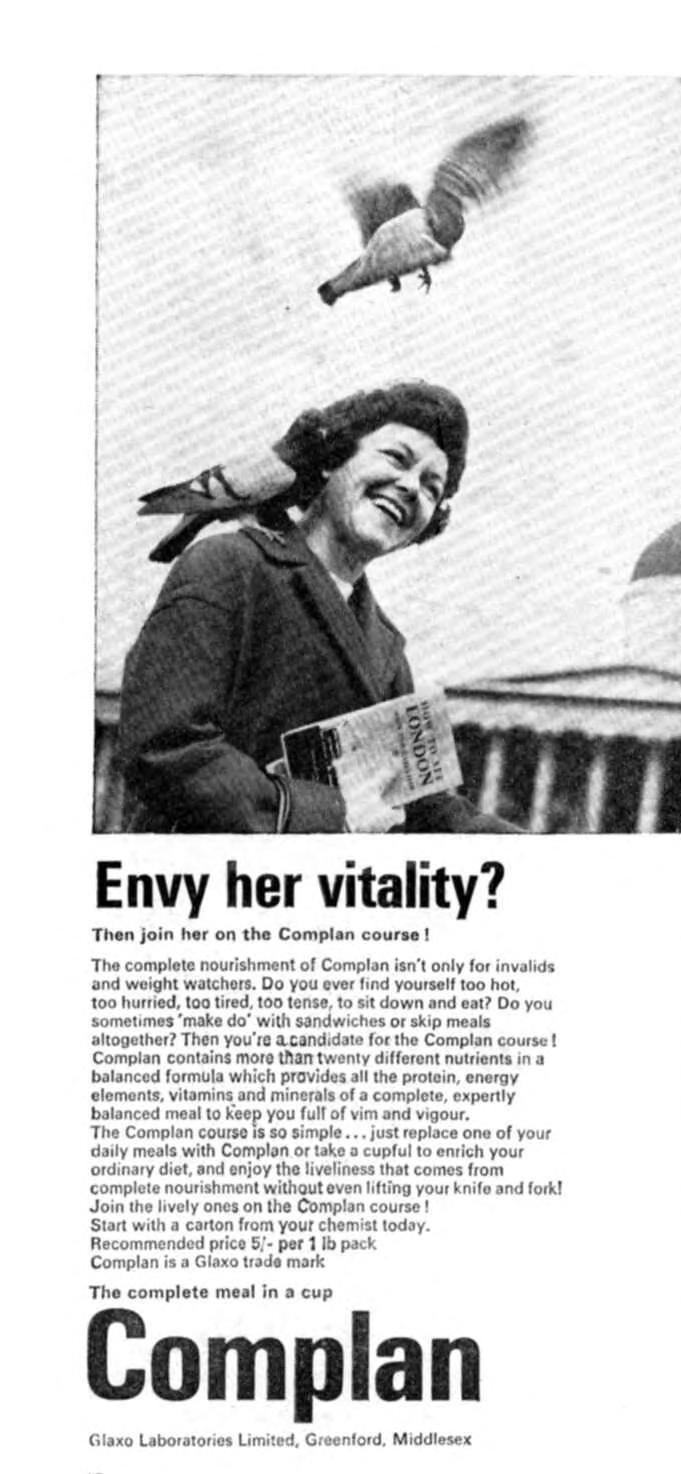
Complan advertisement from 1967

== History ==
Complan was launched by Glaxo in 1954. As part of Glaxo's Farley Health Products subsidiary, the Complan UK brand was sold to Boots in 1988. In India, Complan remained with Glaxo until 1994, when it was acquired by Heinz, who also acquired the UK brand in the same year. Its USP was that it was the complete planned food.

== Present ==
In 2002 a majority stake in the UK business (Complan Foods) was sold to the Saatchi brothers' Saatchinvest.

== Awards and recognition ==
In the Brand Trust Report 2012, Complan was ranked first among India's most trusted nutritional brands and subsequently, according to the Brand Trust Report 2013, Complan was ranked third among India's most trusted nutritional brands. In 2014, however, Complan was ranked fourth among India's most trusted nutritional brands according to the Brand Trust Report 2014, a study conducted by Trust Research Advisory, a brand analytics company.

== Cultural references ==
In The Beauty Queen of Leenane, a play by Martin McDonagh, lumpy Complan is a symbol of family strife.

Author Quentin Crisp was an enthusiastic consumer of Complan.
