= Kitt Green =

Area of Wigan, Greater Manchester, England

Coordinates: 53.5432°N 2.6798°W

- Location within Greater Manchester
- OS grid reference: SD5505
  - London: 176 mi SE
- Metropolitan borough: Wigan
- Metropolitan county: Greater Manchester
- Region: North West
- Country: England
- Sovereign state: United Kingdom
- Post town: WIGAN
- Postcode district: WN5
- Dialling code: 01942
- Police: Greater Manchester
- Fire: Greater Manchester
- Ambulance: North West
- UK Parliament: Wigan

Kitt Green is a suburb of Wigan in Greater Manchester, England. It is the location of a Heinz food processing plant.
