= Mictyris guinotae =

Scientific classification
- Kingdom: Animalia
- Phylum: Arthropoda
- Clade: Pancrustacea
- Class: Malacostraca
- Order: Decapoda
- Suborder: Pleocyemata
- Infraorder: Brachyura
- Family: Mictyridae
- Genus: Mictyris
- Species: M. guinotae

Binomial name
- Mictyris guinotae Davie et al., 2010

Species of crab

Mictyris guinotae is a species of soldier crab of genus Mictyris, endemic to the Ryukyu Islands of Japan. They were named after Danièle Guinot, a professor at the Muséum national d'histoire naturelle in France, and were first treated as a separate species in a tribute volume to Guinot.

== Description ==
Mictyris guinotae has a well-defined subglobular body, slightly less wide than long, a relatively smooth carapace, and long thin legs. They range in color from pale to dark blue, with occasional pale pink variants; they tend to be darker when they are younger and lighter when they are older. The adult male specimens observed had carapaces between 8 and 16 mm long; adult female carapace lengths ranged from 6 to 14 mm.

== Behavior ==
These crabs live in colonies of hundreds to hundreds of thousands of individuals, in flat lagoon areas of the islands they inhabit. In times of low tide, they form large swarms or "armies" that cross the lagoons en masse, while at high tide they remain under the sand. Their main natural predators are shore birds, and they are sensitive to bird shadows, moving quickly away from them.

== Crab computing ==
The predictable behavior of these crabs has led them to be used to replace the billiard balls in billiard-ball computers. In these experiments, swarms of up to 40 crabs were herded down corridors by images of predatory bird shadows. When the configuration of the corridors caused two swarms to meet, they interacted in predictable ways, simulating the behavior of a reversible logic gate.

== Related species ==
Mictyris guinotae crabs resemble another species of the same genus, Mictyris brevidactylus, identified by William Stimpson in 1858 and established as a separate species of Mictyris by Takeda in 1978, and both species were formerly thought to be of the same species. However, M. guinotae is smaller, with slightly different coloring; both types of crabs have light blue carapaces, but M. brevidactylus has red banding on its legs, whereas M. guinotae does not. Additionally, they differ genetically and in the shapes of the gonopods of the males.
