= Soldier crab =

Soldier crab is a term used in different parts of the world for different crustaceans:

- Pagurus bernhardus, a European hermit crab
- Coenobita clypeatus, a Caribbean hermit crab
- Dotilla myctiroides, a true crab from South-east Asia
- several species of the genus Mictyris, an Indo-West Pacific genus of crabs:
  - In Australia, the term soldier crab generally refers to Mictyris longicarpus
