= Platyactaea =

Scientific classification
- Domain: Eukaryota
- Kingdom: Animalia
- Phylum: Arthropoda
- Class: Malacostraca
- Order: Decapoda
- Suborder: Pleocyemata
- Infraorder: Brachyura
- Family: Xanthidae
- Subfamily: Actaeinae
- Genus: Platyactaea; Guinot, 1967

Genus of crabs

Platyactaea is a genus of crabs in the family Xanthidae, containing the following species:

- Platyactaea dovii (Stimpson, 1871)
- Platyactaea setigera (H. Milne Edwards, 1834)
