= Ilyoplax sayajiraoi =

Scientific classification
- Kingdom: Animalia
- Phylum: Arthropoda
- Class: Malacostraca
- Order: Decapoda
- Suborder: Pleocyemata
- Infraorder: Brachyura
- Family: Dotillidae
- Genus: Ilyoplax
- Species: I. sayajiraoi

Binomial name
- Ilyoplax sayajiraoi Trivedi, Soni Trivedi & Vachhrajani, 2015

Species of crab

Ilyoplax sayajiraoi is a species of crab that was discovered in April 2015. The species was discovered by researchers at Maharaja Sayajirao University of Baroda, located in India. The species is of the genus Ilyoplax. The species was named after Sayajirao Gaekwad III.

== Background ==
The species was discovered by Kauresh Vachhrajani and his students on mud flat surfaces located in Kamboi.

== See also ==
- List of organisms named after famous people (born 1800–1899)
