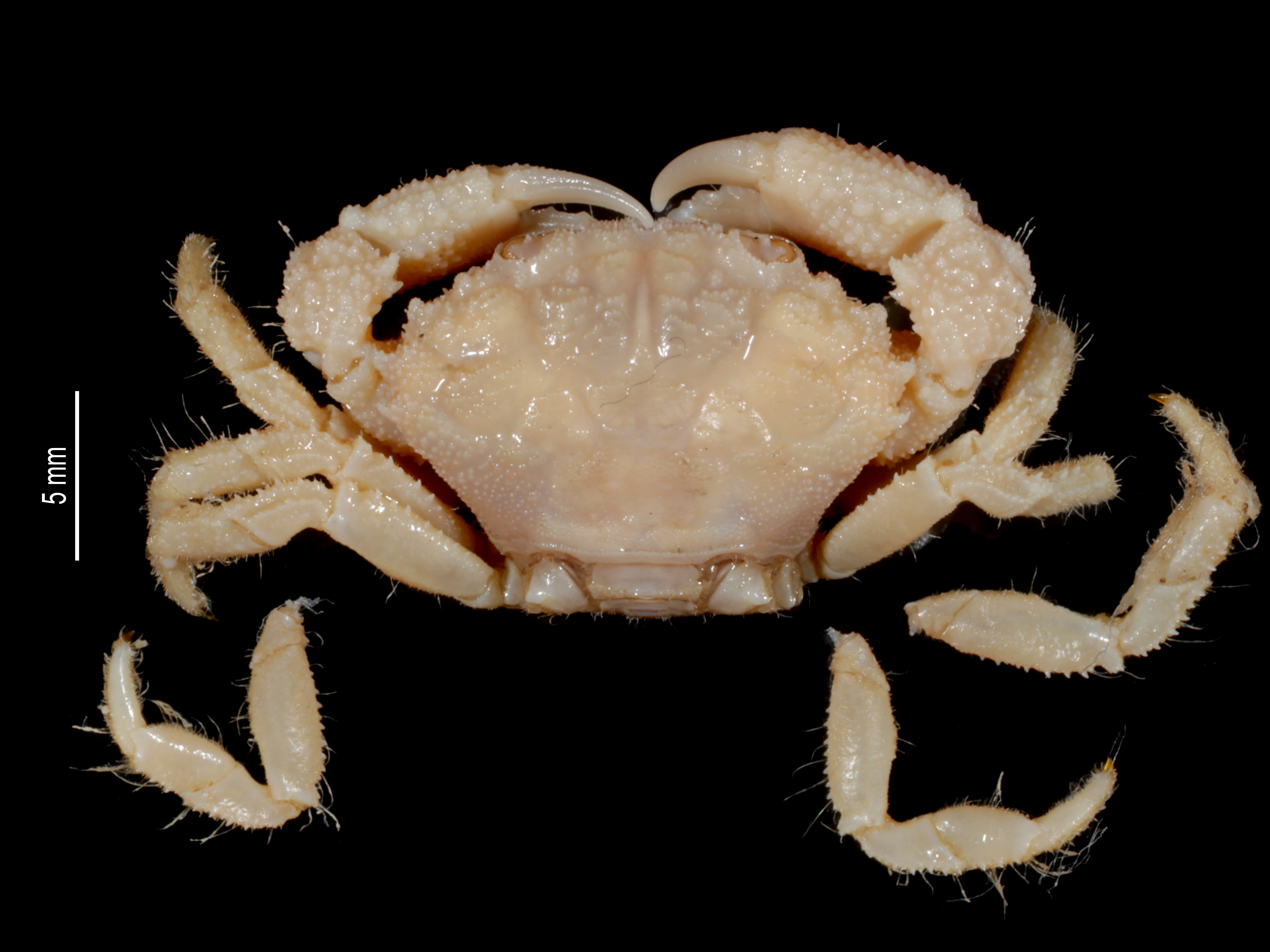
- Pseudomedaeus africanus

Scientific classification
- Domain: Eukaryota
- Kingdom: Animalia
- Phylum: Arthropoda
- Class: Malacostraca
- Order: Decapoda
- Suborder: Pleocyemata
- Infraorder: Brachyura
- Family: Xanthidae
- Subfamily: Xanthinae
- Genus: Pseudomedaeus; Guinot, 1968

= Pseudomedaeus =

Genus of crabs

Pseudomedaeus is a genus of crabs in the family Xanthidae, containing the following species:

- Pseudomedaeus africanus (Monod, 1956)
- Pseudomedaeus agassizi (A. Milne Edwards, 1880)
- Pseudomedaeus distinctus (Rathbun, 1898)
