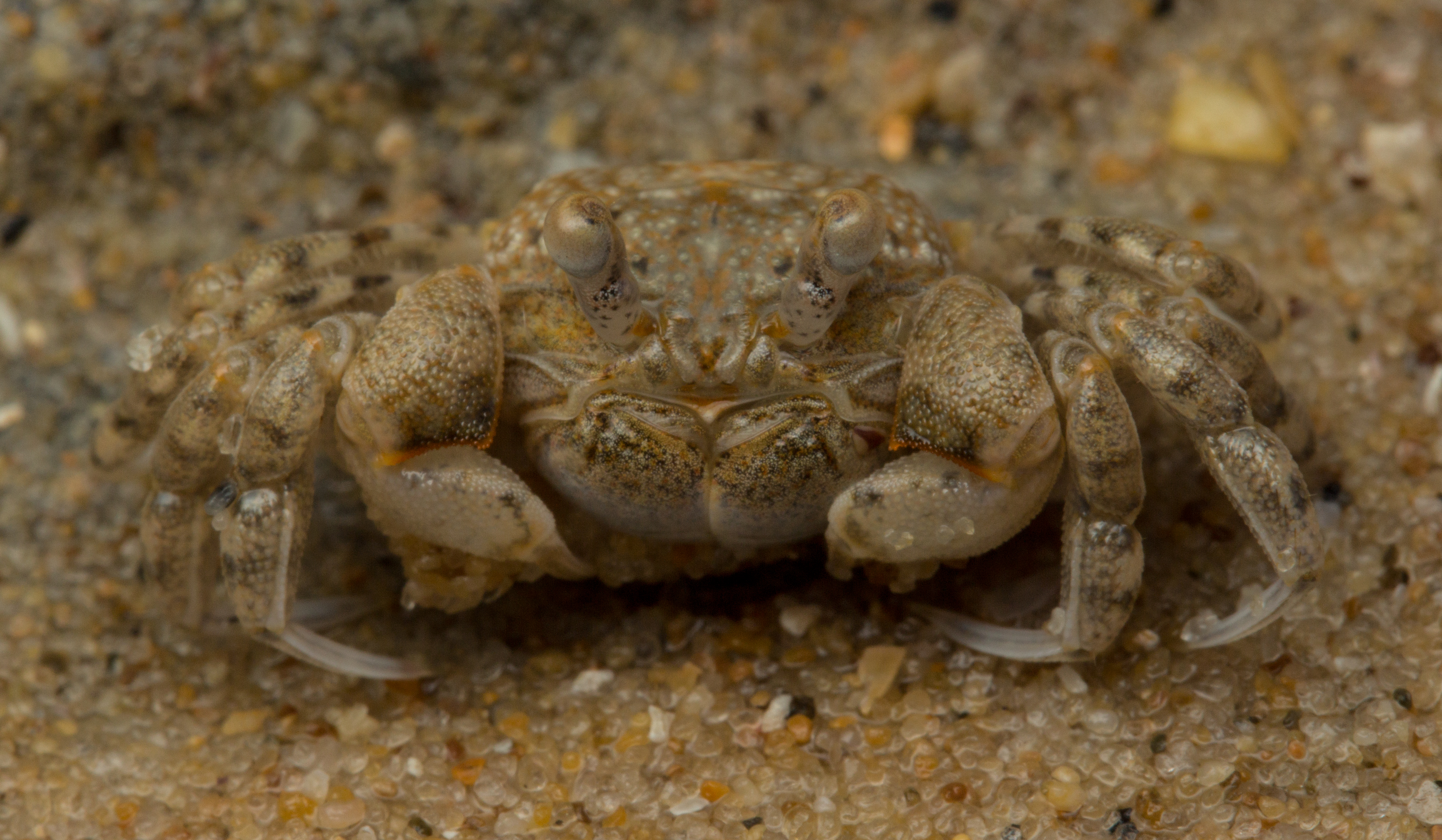

Scientific classification
- Domain: Eukaryota
- Kingdom: Animalia
- Phylum: Arthropoda
- Class: Malacostraca
- Order: Decapoda
- Suborder: Pleocyemata
- Infraorder: Brachyura
- Family: Dotillidae
- Genus: Scopimera
- Species: S. inflata

Binomial name
- Scopimera inflata Milne-Edwards, 1873

= Scopimera inflata =

Species of crab

Scopimera inflata is an Australian endemic species of sand bubbler crab common to wave exposed and estuarine sandy tropical and subtropical beaches of eastern Australia. Scopimera inflata are sand coloured and small sized with adults growing to 12mm across. The species occur in aggregations just below the high tide mark with females and smaller individuals mainly on the seaward side and males on the terrestrial side of the aggregation.
