= Climate of Brisbane =

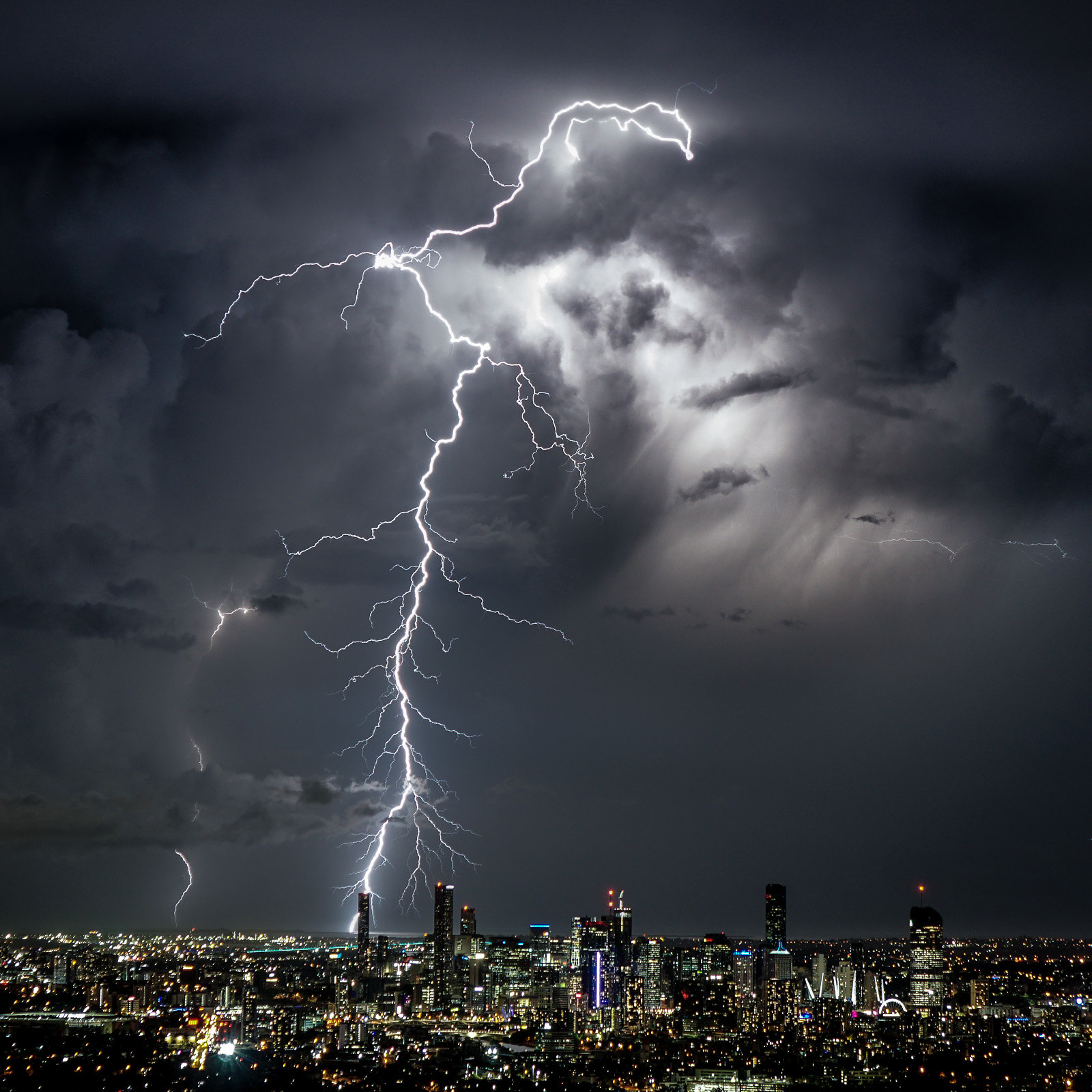
Lightning over the Brisbane city centre, February 2020

Brisbane has a humid subtropical climate (Köppen climate classification: Cfa) with year-round period with warm to hot temperatures. Brisbane generally experiences 3 months of mild cool winter from June to August.

== Temperatures ==
Brisbane experiences an annual mean minimum of 16.6 °C (62 °F) and mean maximum of 26.6 °C (80 °F), making it Australia's second-hottest capital city after Darwin. Seasonality is not pronounced, and average maximum temperatures of above 26 °C (79 °F) persist from October through to April.

Due to its proximity to the Coral Sea of the Pacific Ocean and a warm ocean current, Brisbane's overall temperature variability is somewhat less than most Australian capitals. Temperatures only occasionally reach 35 °C (95 °F) or more. June and July are the coldest months, with average maximums of about 22 °C (72 °F); maximum temperatures below 20 °C (68 °F) are rare. Brisbane has never recorded a sub-zero minimum temperature (with one exception at night), and minimums are generally warm to mild year-round, averaging about 21 °C (70 °F) in summer and 11 °C (52 °F) in coldest month.

=== Temperature records ===
The city's highest recorded temperature was 43.2 °C (109.8 °F) on Australia Day 1940 at the Brisbane Regional Office, with the highest temperature at the current station being 41.7 °C (107.1 °F) on 22 February 2004; but temperatures above 38 °C (100 °F) are uncommon. On 19 July 2007, Brisbane's temperature fell below the freezing point for the first time since records began, registering −0.1 °C (31.8 °F) at the airport station. The city station has never dropped below 2 °C (36 °F), with the average coldest night during winter being around 6 °C (43 °F); however, locations directly west of Brisbane such as Ipswich have dropped as low as −5 °C (23 °F) with heavy ground frost. In 2009, Brisbane recorded its hottest winter day (from June to August) at 35.4 °C (95.7 °F) on 24 August; The average July day however is around 22 °C (72 °F) with sunny skies and low humidity, occasionally as high as 27 °C (81 °F), whilst maximum temperatures below 18 °C (64 °F) are uncommon and usually associated with brief periods of cloud and winter rain. The highest minimum temperature ever recorded in Brisbane was 28.0 °C (82.4 °F) on 29 January 1940 and again on 21 January 2017, whilst the lowest maximum temperature was 10.2 °C (50.4 °F) on 12 August 1954.

=== Sea temperature ===
The average annual temperature of the sea ranges from 21.0 °C (69.8 °F) in July to 27.0 °C (80.6 °F) in February.

Sea temperature (°C)
Jan	Feb	Mar	Apr	May	Jun	Jul	Aug	Sep	Oct	Nov	Dec	Year
26.3	27.2	26.5	25.5	24.1	22.6	21.6	21.4	22.0	22.9	24.5	25.7	24.0

== Precipitation ==
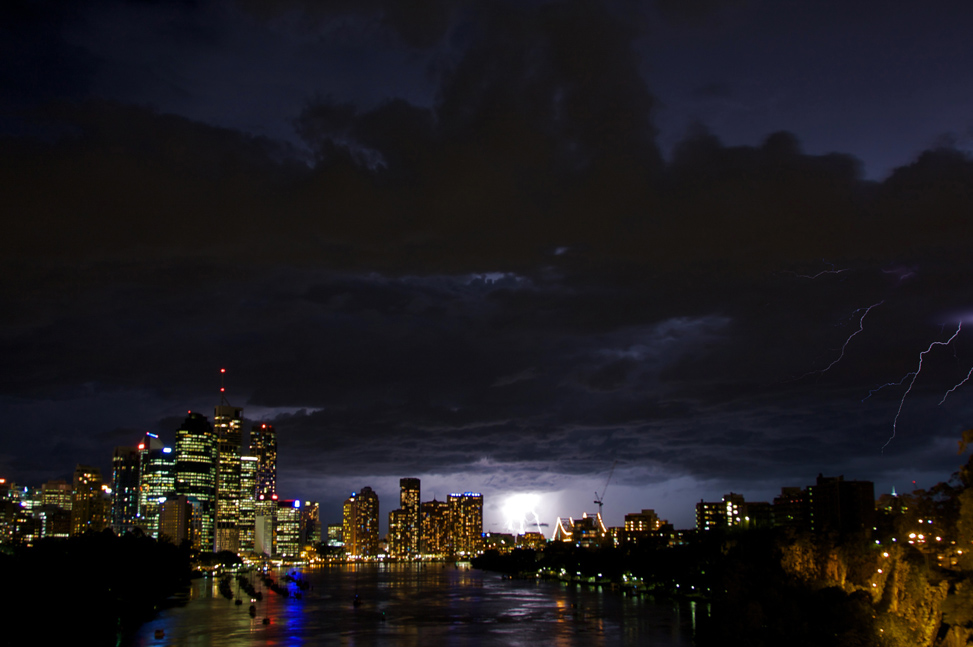
A spring storm with lightning over the central business district

From November to March, thunderstorms are common over Brisbane, with the more severe events accompanied by large damaging hail stones, torrential rain and destructive winds. On an annual basis, Brisbane averages 124 clear days. Dewpoints in the summer average at around 20 °C (68 °F); the apparent temperature exceeds 30 °C (86 °F) on almost all summer days.

Brisbane's wettest day occurred on 21 January 1887, when 465 millimetres (18.3 in) of rain fell on the city, the highest maximum daily rainfall of Australia's capital cities. The wettest month on record was February 1893, when 1,025.9 millimetres (40.39 in) of rain fell. Very occasionally a whole month will pass with no recorded rainfall, the last time this happened was August 1991.

From 2001 until 2010, Brisbane and surrounding temperate areas had been experiencing the most severe drought in over a century, with dam levels dropping to 16.9% of their capacity on 10 August 2007. Residents were mandated by local laws to observe level 6 water restrictions on gardening and other outdoor water usage. Per capita water usage was below 140 litres per day, giving Brisbane one of the lowest per capita usages of water of any developed city in the world. On 9 January 2011, an upper low crossed north of Brisbane and dropped rainfall on an already saturated southeast coast of Queensland, resulting in severe flooding and damage in Brisbane and the surrounding area; the same storm season also caused the water storage to climb to over 98% of maximum capacity and broke the drought. Water restrictions have been replaced with water conservation measures that aim at a target of 200 litres per day/per person, but consumption is rarely over 160 litres. In November 2011, Brisbane saw 22 days with no recorded rainfall, which was the driest start to a November since 1919.

== Wind ==
Brisbane also lies in the Tropical Cyclone risk area. The most recent to directly affect Brisbane was Severe Tropical Cyclone Alfred in March 2025. Although it was downgraded to a tropical low prior to landfall, the storm still caused severe flooding and damage to the region. The last to affect Brisbane indirectly was Severe Tropical Cyclone Oma in February 2019. The city is susceptible to severe thunderstorms in the spring and summer months; on 16 November 2008 a severe storm caused tremendous damage in the outer suburbs, most notably The Gap. Roofs were torn off houses and hundreds of trees were felled. More recently, on 27 November 2014, a very strong storm made a direct hit on the city centre. Described as 'the worst storm in a decade,' very large hail, to the size of cricket balls, smashed skyscraper windows while a flash flood tore through the CBD. Wind gusts of 141 km/h (88 mph) were recorded in some suburbs, many houses were severely damaged, cars were destroyed and planes were flipped at the Brisbane and Archerfield Airports. Dust storms in Brisbane are extremely rare; on 23 September 2009, however, a severe dust storm blanketed Brisbane, as well as other parts of eastern Australia.

== UV index ==
Ultraviolet index
Jan	Feb	Mar	Apr	May	Jun	Jul	Aug	Sep	Oct	Nov	Dec	Year
13	12	10	7	4	3	4	5	7	9	11	12	8.0

== Weather boxes ==
Climate data for Brisbane City Centre (1999–2024 normals, extremes 1887–present)
Month	Jan	Feb	Mar	Apr	May	Jun	Jul	Aug	Sep	Oct	Nov	Dec	Year
Record high °C (°F)	43.2 (109.8)	41.7 (107.1)	38.8 (101.8)	36.1 (97.0)	32.4 (90.3)	31.6 (88.9)	29.1 (84.4)	35.4 (95.7)	38.3 (100.9)	40.7 (105.3)	41.2 (106.2)	41.2 (106.2)	43.2 (109.8)
Mean maximum °C (°F)	35.4 (95.7)	35.0 (95.0)	33.9 (93.0)	30.7 (87.3)	28.1 (82.6)	26.0 (78.8)	25.9 (78.6)	28.6 (83.5)	31.4 (88.5)	33.7 (92.7)	33.5 (92.3)	35.2 (95.4)	37.3 (99.1)
Mean daily maximum °C (°F)	30.4 (86.7)	30.2 (86.4)	29.2 (84.6)	27.2 (81.0)	24.5 (76.1)	22.1 (71.8)	22.0 (71.6)	23.5 (74.3)	25.7 (78.3)	27.1 (80.8)	28.3 (82.9)	29.6 (85.3)	26.7 (80.1)
Daily mean °C (°F)	26.1 (79.0)	25.9 (78.6)	24.8 (76.6)	22.3 (72.1)	19.2 (66.6)	17.0 (62.6)	16.3 (61.3)	17.3 (63.1)	19.8 (67.6)	21.8 (71.2)	23.6 (74.5)	25.1 (77.2)	21.6 (70.9)
Mean daily minimum °C (°F)	21.7 (71.1)	21.5 (70.7)	20.3 (68.5)	17.4 (63.3)	13.9 (57.0)	11.8 (53.2)	10.5 (50.9)	11.1 (52.0)	13.9 (57.0)	16.5 (61.7)	18.8 (65.8)	20.6 (69.1)	16.5 (61.7)
Mean minimum °C (°F)	18.5 (65.3)	18.8 (65.8)	17.1 (62.8)	13.5 (56.3)	8.7 (47.7)	6.8 (44.2)	5.5 (41.9)	6.5 (43.7)	9.6 (49.3)	12.2 (54.0)	14.4 (57.9)	16.7 (62.1)	5.2 (41.4)
Record low °C (°F)	17.0 (62.6)	16.5 (61.7)	12.2 (54.0)	10.0 (50.0)	5.0 (41.0)	5.0 (41.0)	2.6 (36.7)	4.1 (39.4)	7.0 (44.6)	8.8 (47.8)	10.8 (51.4)	14.0 (57.2)	2.6 (36.7)
Average precipitation mm (inches)	141.1 (5.56)	181.9 (7.16)	129.3 (5.09)	60.5 (2.38)	69.8 (2.75)	56.9 (2.24)	30.4 (1.20)	34.6 (1.36)	29.7 (1.17)	85.8 (3.38)	100.1 (3.94)	140.0 (5.51)	1,048.2 (41.27)
Average rainy days (≥ 1 mm)	8.8	9.7	9.7	7.0	6.0	6.0	4.0	3.7	3.9	7.2	7.9	8.9	82.8
Average afternoon relative humidity (%)	57	59	57	54	49	52	44	43	48	51	56	57	52
Average dew point °C (°F)	19.0 (66.2)	19.1 (66.4)	17.5 (63.5)	15.0 (59.0)	10.9 (51.6)	9.8 (49.6)	7.2 (45.0)	7.4 (45.3)	11.0 (51.8)	13.4 (56.1)	15.8 (60.4)	17.5 (63.5)	13.6 (56.5)
Mean monthly sunshine hours	267	235	233	237	239	198	239	270	267	270	273	264	2,989
Percentage possible sunshine	63	65	62	69	71	63	73	78	74	68	67	62	68
Source: Bureau of Meteorology

Climate data for Brisbane Airport (Coastal, 1994–2025 normals, extremes 1949–present)
Month	Jan	Feb	Mar	Apr	May	Jun	Jul	Aug	Sep	Oct	Nov	Dec	Year
Record high °C (°F)	39.1 (102.4)	40.2 (104.4)	38.3 (100.9)	34.3 (93.7)	30.6 (87.1)	28.3 (82.9)	29.6 (85.3)	33.7 (92.7)	34.9 (94.8)	39.1 (102.4)	39.4 (102.9)	39.6 (103.3)	40.2 (104.4)
Mean maximum °C (°F)	33.2 (91.8)	32.5 (90.5)	31.6 (88.9)	29.6 (85.3)	27.1 (80.8)	24.8 (76.6)	24.8 (76.6)	26.2 (79.2)	29.2 (84.6)	30.7 (87.3)	31.6 (88.9)	32.7 (90.9)	35.1 (95.2)
Mean daily maximum °C (°F)	29.1 (84.4)	29.1 (84.4)	28.0 (82.4)	26.1 (79.0)	23.6 (74.5)	21.3 (70.3)	21.0 (69.8)	22.1 (71.8)	24.2 (75.6)	25.5 (77.9)	27.0 (80.6)	28.3 (82.9)	25.4 (77.8)
Daily mean °C (°F)	25.3 (77.5)	25.2 (77.4)	24.0 (75.2)	21.4 (70.5)	18.4 (65.1)	16.0 (60.8)	15.2 (59.4)	16.1 (61.0)	18.6 (65.5)	20.7 (69.3)	22.7 (72.9)	24.3 (75.7)	20.7 (69.2)
Mean daily minimum °C (°F)	21.4 (70.5)	21.2 (70.2)	19.9 (67.8)	16.6 (61.9)	13.1 (55.6)	10.7 (51.3)	9.4 (48.9)	10.0 (50.0)	13.0 (55.4)	15.9 (60.6)	18.4 (65.1)	20.3 (68.5)	15.8 (60.5)
Mean minimum °C (°F)	17.7 (63.9)	17.8 (64.0)	16.0 (60.8)	11.8 (53.2)	7.3 (45.1)	4.7 (40.5)	3.7 (38.7)	4.8 (40.6)	7.8 (46.0)	10.6 (51.1)	13.4 (56.1)	16.0 (60.8)	3.2 (37.8)
Record low °C (°F)	15.7 (60.3)	14.6 (58.3)	10.6 (51.1)	5.6 (42.1)	3.0 (37.4)	0.6 (33.1)	−0.1 (31.8)	0.6 (33.1)	2.6 (36.7)	7.2 (45.0)	8.3 (46.9)	12.1 (53.8)	−0.1 (31.8)
Average rainfall mm (inches)	127.8 (5.03)	155.1 (6.11)	130.6 (5.14)	74.4 (2.93)	98.2 (3.87)	60.2 (2.37)	31.4 (1.24)	35.2 (1.39)	31.9 (1.26)	80.3 (3.16)	96.8 (3.81)	124.4 (4.90)	1,046.3 (41.21)
Mean monthly sunshine hours	263.5	214.7	238.7	222.0	198.4	216.0	226.3	260.4	267.0	263.5	258.0	272.8	2,901.3
Percentage possible sunshine	63	58	63	65	60	69	69	75	74	66	64	64	66
Source: Bureau of Meteorology

Climate data for Archerfield Airport (Inland, 1991–2020 normals, extremes 1939–present)
Month	Jan	Feb	Mar	Apr	May	Jun	Jul	Aug	Sep	Oct	Nov	Dec	Year
Record high °C (°F)	43.5 (110.3)	41.8 (107.2)	40.2 (104.4)	34.9 (94.8)	31.3 (88.3)	28.9 (84.0)	29.2 (84.6)	36.3 (97.3)	37.8 (100.0)	39.4 (102.9)	42.1 (107.8)	41.2 (106.2)	43.5 (110.3)
Mean maximum °C (°F)	36.4 (97.5)	35.4 (95.7)	34.1 (93.4)	30.8 (87.4)	27.9 (82.2)	25.6 (78.1)	25.7 (78.3)	28.3 (82.9)	31.5 (88.7)	34.1 (93.4)	34.6 (94.3)	35.8 (96.4)	38.3 (100.9)
Mean daily maximum °C (°F)	30.8 (87.4)	30.3 (86.5)	29.3 (84.7)	27.1 (80.8)	24.3 (75.7)	21.8 (71.2)	21.7 (71.1)	23.2 (73.8)	25.9 (78.6)	27.4 (81.3)	28.8 (83.8)	29.8 (85.6)	26.7 (80.0)
Daily mean °C (°F)	25.8 (78.4)	25.4 (77.7)	24.1 (75.4)	21.3 (70.3)	18.2 (64.8)	15.8 (60.4)	14.9 (58.8)	15.8 (60.4)	18.8 (65.8)	21.1 (70.0)	23.2 (73.8)	24.6 (76.3)	20.8 (69.3)
Mean daily minimum °C (°F)	20.8 (69.4)	20.5 (68.9)	18.8 (65.8)	15.4 (59.7)	12.0 (53.6)	9.7 (49.5)	8.1 (46.6)	8.3 (46.9)	11.7 (53.1)	14.8 (58.6)	17.5 (63.5)	19.3 (66.7)	14.7 (58.5)
Mean minimum °C (°F)	16.6 (61.9)	16.8 (62.2)	14.6 (58.3)	10.8 (51.4)	6.3 (43.3)	3.6 (38.5)	2.7 (36.9)	3.2 (37.8)	6.2 (43.2)	9.4 (48.9)	12.5 (54.5)	14.4 (57.9)	1.9 (35.4)
Record low °C (°F)	13.7 (56.7)	14.2 (57.6)	10.1 (50.2)	5.3 (41.5)	1.1 (34.0)	−0.8 (30.6)	−2.5 (27.5)	−1.8 (28.8)	−0.4 (31.3)	4.2 (39.6)	7.2 (45.0)	9.8 (49.6)	−2.5 (27.5)
Average rainfall mm (inches)	118.6 (4.67)	138.7 (5.46)	100.3 (3.95)	51.9 (2.04)	77.1 (3.04)	57.1 (2.25)	25.8 (1.02)	34.8 (1.37)	28.0 (1.10)	71.0 (2.80)	90.2 (3.55)	122.3 (4.81)	915.8 (36.06)
Source: Bureau of Meteorology

Climate data for Ipswich–Amberley Air Base (Distant inland, 1991–2020 normals, extremes 1941–2024)
Month	Jan	Feb	Mar	Apr	May	Jun	Jul	Aug	Sep	Oct	Nov	Dec	Year
Record high °C (°F)	44.3 (111.7)	43.0 (109.4)	41.3 (106.3)	36.8 (98.2)	33.3 (91.9)	29.9 (85.8)	29.6 (85.3)	36.5 (97.7)	40.1 (104.2)	41.3 (106.3)	43.0 (109.4)	43.8 (110.8)	44.3 (111.7)
Mean maximum °C (°F)	38.2 (100.8)	37.0 (98.6)	35.0 (95.0)	31.7 (89.1)	28.6 (83.5)	26.3 (79.3)	26.3 (79.3)	29.2 (84.6)	33.1 (91.6)	35.7 (96.3)	36.9 (98.4)	38.0 (100.4)	40.2 (104.4)
Mean daily maximum °C (°F)	31.7 (89.1)	30.9 (87.6)	29.9 (85.8)	27.6 (81.7)	24.6 (76.3)	22.1 (71.8)	22.0 (71.6)	23.8 (74.8)	26.9 (80.4)	28.5 (83.3)	30.1 (86.2)	31.0 (87.8)	27.4 (81.4)
Daily mean °C (°F)	25.7 (78.3)	25.2 (77.4)	23.7 (74.7)	20.5 (68.9)	17.0 (62.6)	14.5 (58.1)	13.6 (56.5)	14.6 (58.3)	18.2 (64.8)	20.8 (69.4)	23.1 (73.6)	24.6 (76.3)	20.1 (68.2)
Mean daily minimum °C (°F)	19.6 (67.3)	19.4 (66.9)	17.5 (63.5)	13.4 (56.1)	9.4 (48.9)	6.8 (44.2)	5.1 (41.2)	5.4 (41.7)	9.4 (48.9)	13.0 (55.4)	16.1 (61.0)	18.2 (64.8)	12.8 (55.0)
Mean minimum °C (°F)	14.5 (58.1)	14.9 (58.8)	12.3 (54.1)	7.3 (45.1)	2.1 (35.8)	−0.8 (30.6)	−1.7 (28.9)	−1.2 (29.8)	3.0 (37.4)	6.3 (43.3)	10.1 (50.2)	12.4 (54.3)	−2.6 (27.3)
Record low °C (°F)	11.6 (52.9)	11.1 (52.0)	6.7 (44.1)	1.0 (33.8)	−3.1 (26.4)	−4.3 (24.3)	−4.8 (23.4)	−4.9 (23.2)	−0.2 (31.6)	2.1 (35.8)	4.9 (40.8)	6.8 (44.2)	−4.9 (23.2)
Average precipitation mm (inches)	108.1 (4.26)	105.0 (4.13)	77.7 (3.06)	37.8 (1.49)	54.0 (2.13)	38.1 (1.50)	23.4 (0.92)	22.9 (0.90)	31.5 (1.24)	62.2 (2.45)	81.8 (3.22)	113.8 (4.48)	750.3 (29.54)
Average precipitation days (≥ 1.0 mm)	7.2	7.5	6.8	4.1	5.2	4.3	3.8	3.1	3.8	6.0	6.5	7.9	66.2
Average afternoon relative humidity (%)	49	53	49	45	45	45	39	34	35	40	45	48	44
Average dew point °C (°F)	17.6 (63.7)	18.0 (64.4)	15.9 (60.6)	12.5 (54.5)	9.7 (49.5)	7.5 (45.5)	5.0 (41.0)	4.0 (39.2)	6.5 (43.7)	10.3 (50.5)	13.5 (56.3)	16.0 (60.8)	11.4 (52.5)
Source: Bureau of Meteorology

Climate data for Redcliffe, coastal, 1981–2004
Month	Jan	Feb	Mar	Apr	May	Jun	Jul	Aug	Sep	Oct	Nov	Dec	Year
Mean daily maximum °C (°F)	29.0 (84.2)	28.5 (83.3)	27.5 (81.5)	25.6 (78.1)	23.3 (73.9)	21.9 (71.4)	20.7 (69.3)	21.7 (71.1)	24.0 (75.2)	25.2 (77.4)	26.6 (79.9)	28.1 (82.6)	25.2 (77.3)
Daily mean °C (°F)	25.5 (77.9)	25.0 (77.0)	23.7 (74.7)	21.6 (70.9)	19.0 (66.2)	16.2 (61.2)	15.3 (59.5)	16.5 (61.7)	19.0 (66.2)	20.9 (69.6)	22.7 (72.9)	24.3 (75.7)	20.8 (69.5)
Mean daily minimum °C (°F)	21.9 (71.4)	21.4 (70.5)	19.9 (67.8)	17.5 (63.5)	14.7 (58.5)	11.4 (52.5)	9.9 (49.8)	11.2 (52.2)	13.9 (57.0)	16.5 (61.7)	18.7 (65.7)	20.5 (68.9)	16.5 (61.6)
Average rainfall mm (inches)	111.6 (4.39)	163.2 (6.43)	127.2 (5.01)	120.2 (4.73)	103.9 (4.09)	61.7 (2.43)	51.3 (2.02)	39.7 (1.56)	30.2 (1.19)	70.4 (2.77)	101.6 (4.00)	117.8 (4.64)	1,098.8 (43.26)
Source: Bureau of Meteorology

Climate data for Brisbane (1999–2024 normals)
Month	Jan	Feb	Mar	Apr	May	Jun	Jul	Aug	Sep	Oct	Nov	Dec	Year
Record high °C (°F)	40.0 (104.0)	41.7 (107.1)	37.9 (100.2)	33.7 (92.7)	30.7 (87.3)	29.0 (84.2)	29.1 (84.4)	35.4 (95.7)	37.0 (98.6)	38.7 (101.7)	38.9 (102.0)	41.2 (106.2)	41.7 (107.1)
Mean daily maximum °C (°F)	30.4 (86.7)	30.2 (86.4)	29.2 (84.6)	27.2 (81.0)	24.5 (76.1)	22.1 (71.8)	22.0 (71.6)	23.5 (74.3)	25.7 (78.3)	27.1 (80.8)	28.3 (82.9)	29.6 (85.3)	26.7 (80.1)
Daily mean °C (°F)	26.1 (79.0)	25.9 (78.6)	24.8 (76.6)	22.3 (72.1)	19.2 (66.6)	17.0 (62.6)	16.3 (61.3)	17.3 (63.1)	19.8 (67.6)	21.8 (71.2)	23.6 (74.5)	25.1 (77.2)	21.6 (70.9)
Mean daily minimum °C (°F)	21.7 (71.1)	21.5 (70.7)	20.3 (68.5)	17.4 (63.3)	13.9 (57.0)	11.8 (53.2)	10.5 (50.9)	11.1 (52.0)	13.9 (57.0)	16.5 (61.7)	18.8 (65.8)	20.6 (69.1)	16.5 (61.7)
Record low °C (°F)	17.0 (62.6)	16.5 (61.7)	12.2 (54.0)	10.0 (50.0)	5.0 (41.0)	5.0 (41.0)	2.6 (36.7)	4.1 (39.4)	7.0 (44.6)	8.8 (47.8)	10.8 (51.4)	14.0 (57.2)	2.6 (36.7)
Average precipitation mm (inches)	141.1 (5.56)	181.9 (7.16)	129.3 (5.09)	60.5 (2.38)	69.8 (2.75)	56.9 (2.24)	30.4 (1.20)	34.6 (1.36)	29.7 (1.17)	85.8 (3.38)	100.1 (3.94)	140.0 (5.51)	1,048.2 (41.27)
Average rainy days (≥ 1 mm)	8.8	9.7	9.7	7.0	6.0	6.0	4.0	3.7	3.9	7.2	7.9	8.9	82.8
Average afternoon relative humidity (%)	57	59	57	54	49	52	44	43	48	51	56	57	52
Mean monthly sunshine hours	267	235	233	237	239	198	239	270	267	270	273	264	2,989
Percentage possible sunshine	63	65	62	69	71	63	73	78	74	68	67	62	68
Average ultraviolet index	13	12	10	7	5	4	4	5	7	10	12	13	9
Source: Bureau of Meteorology

== See also ==
- Climate of Australia
- Geography of Brisbane
- Environment of Australia
- Australian region tropical cyclone
- Climate change in Australia
- Effects of global warming on Australia
