= Geography of Brisbane =

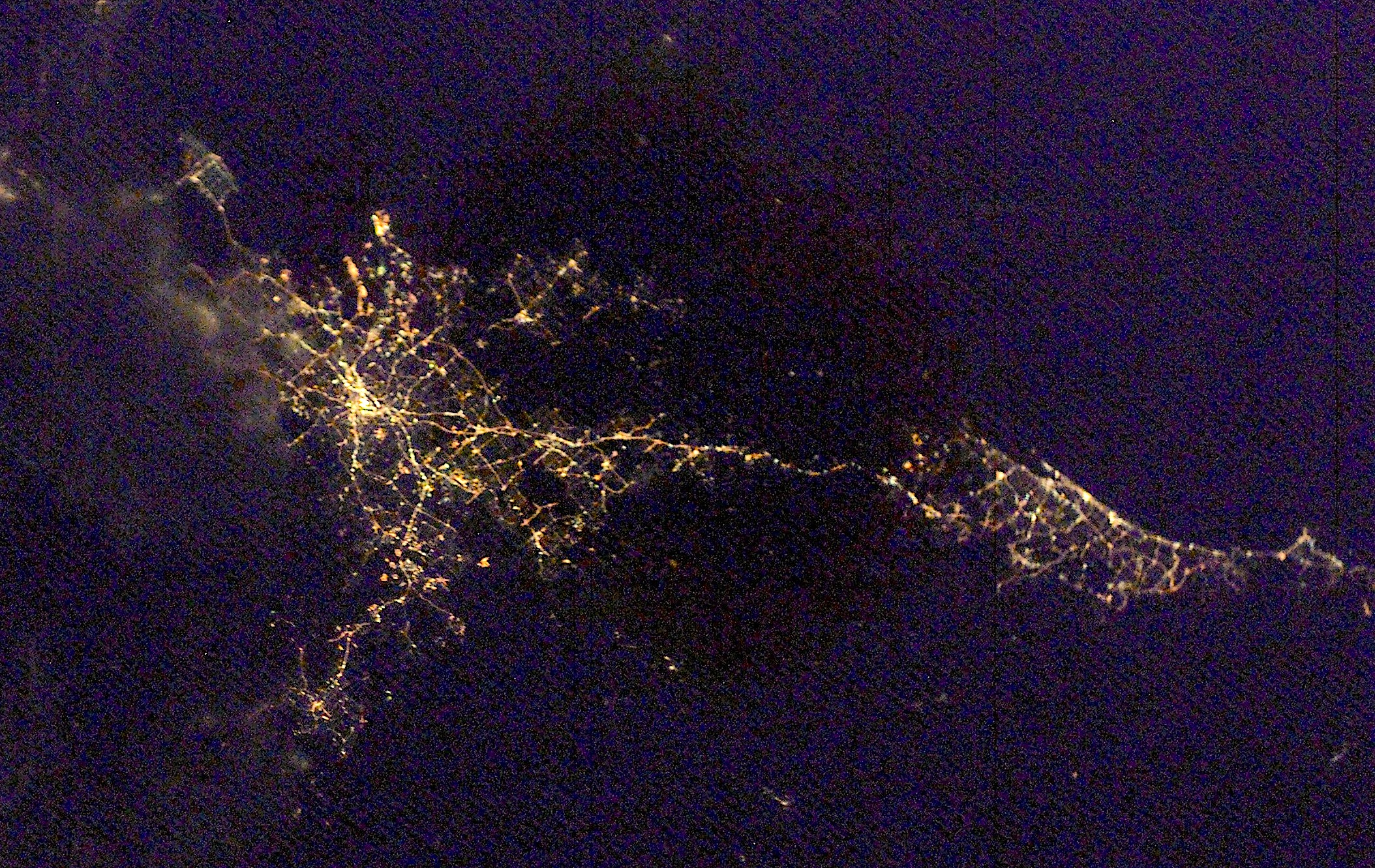
The Brisbane area at night taken by satellite.

The geography of Brisbane is characterised by its coastal location in the south eastern corner of the Queensland state of Australia. It is located halfway up the Australian east coast with longitudinal and latitudinal coordinates of 27.5° south and 153° east. The city resides within the Moreton Bay Floodplain, stretching from Caboolture to the north, Beenleigh to the south and as far as Ipswich to the west whilst being bordered by the Pacific Ocean to the east.

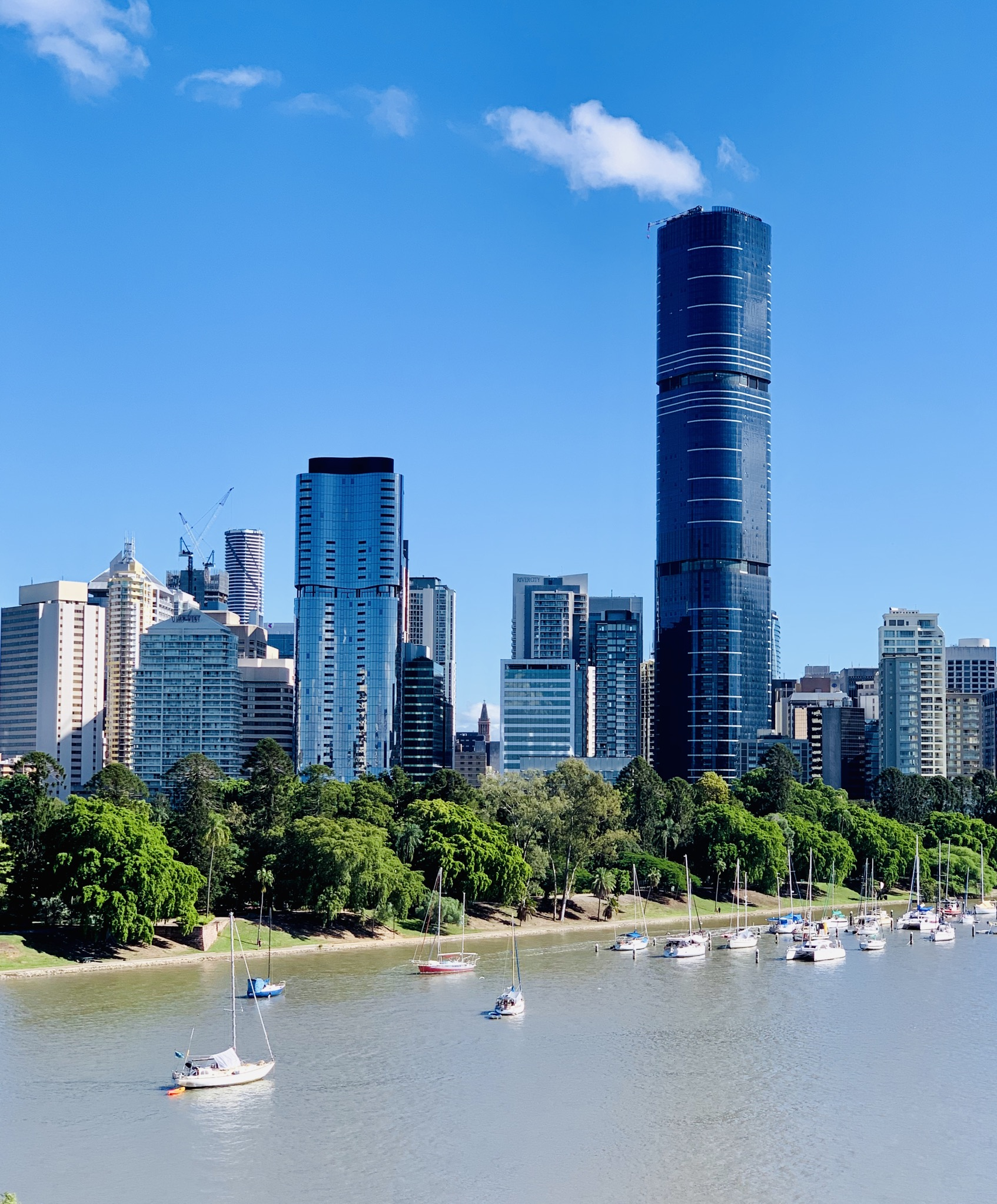
Brisbane Skytower and Skylines of Brisbane CBD from Kangaroo Point, Queensland. Brisbane City Hall is seen in the centre of this photo.

== Geology ==
Over millions of years, layers of sediment have been deposited into the Brisbane region, which was originally a large marine area below sea level. Due to this continued sediment deposition and gradual metamorphosis, the area rose above sea level with the aid of continental shift. The Brisbane River and estuary was hence created through agents of erosion and weathering thereafter. The region also contains sporadic deposits of volcanic rock, suggesting volcanic activity was a geological event in the past.

The region is underlain by a series of different rock types, generally dependent on the differing points of elevation around the floodplains. To the southern parts of the area, mesozoic sedimentary formations form the rolling hills that characterise the region. The relatively flat residential regions consist of volcanic and sedimentary formations upon older basement rock such as jurassic basin sediments, and largely consist of fine-grained sediments. This includes shales, siltstones, sandstones and some minor rhyolites and tuffs. Moreover, the areas of higher elevation to the north west of the Brisbane region are built on resistant basement rocks consisting of greywacke, phyllite, schist, quartzite, chert, shale and sandstone. These underlying basement rocks are from the Palaeozoic era.

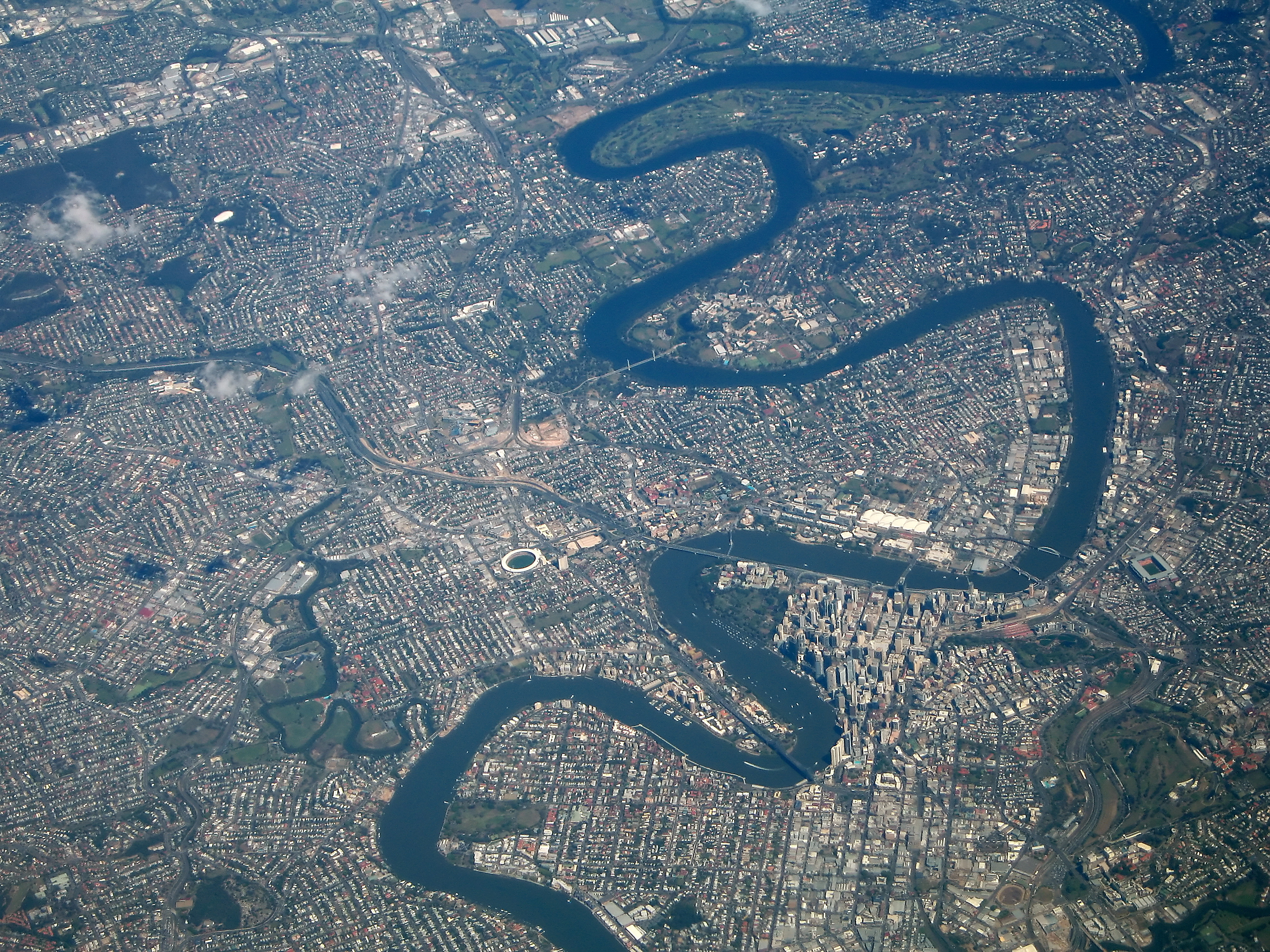
Aerial View of the Brisbane River, Queensland, Australia

Much of the rock upon which Brisbane is located is the characteristic Brisbane tuff, a form of welded ignimbrite, which is most prominently found at the Kangaroo Point Cliffs at Kangaroo Point and the New Farm Cliffs on the Petrie Bight reach of the Brisbane River. The stone was used in the construction of historical buildings such as the Commissariat Store and Cathedral of St Stephen, and the roadside kerbs in inner areas of Brisbane are still manufactured of Brisbane tuff.

=== Rivers ===
The Brisbane River travels 344 kilometres (214 mi) across the Queensland state from Mount Stanley to Moreton Bay, therefore being the longest river in South East Queensland. Its headwaters originate 140 kilometres north-east of central Brisbane with numerous tributaries, primarily the Stanley River, Cooyar Creek and a host of smaller streams running off the Blackbutt Range. The river and its tributaries cover an area of 13,500 square kilometres across the catchment area, whilst also joining several other river systems that transport the water coastwards.

As the river runs its course through the city, it passes the city's original settlement location, Brisbane's Central Business District (CBD) at the curve of the river approximately 23 kilometres (14 mi) upstream from Moreton Bay. The river is also artificially dammed by Wivenhoe Dam creating Lake Wivenhoe, which serves as the city's main water supply. Historically, the river banks were characterised by its predominant industrial land-use, with port facilities downstream from Victoria Bridge to the mouth of the river at Moreton Bay. Refineries were constructed towards the bay, as well as the Fisherman Island wharf, tug-towing, water police and customs facilities on Whyte Island. However, the river frontages have become gentrified in the last 30 years, with wharf facilities and industrial buildings replaced by parklands, residential apartments and the arts precinct.

The Brisbane River is a wide tidal estuary and its waters throughout most of the metropolitan area are brackish and navigable. The river takes a winding course through the metropolitan area with many steep curves from the southwest to its mouth at Moreton Bay in the east.

The metropolitan area is also traversed by several other rivers and creeks including the North Pine and South Pine rivers in the northern suburbs, which converge to form the Pine River estuary at Bramble Bay, the Caboolture River further north, the Logan and Albert rivers in the south-eastern suburbs, and tributaries of the Brisbane River including the Bremer River in the south-western suburbs, Breakfast Creek in the inner-north, Norman Creek in the inner-south, Oxley Creek in the south, Bulimba Creek in the inner south-east and Moggill Creek in the west. The city is on a low-lying floodplain, with the risk of flooding increased by the many suburban creeks which criss-cross the city.

== Ecology ==
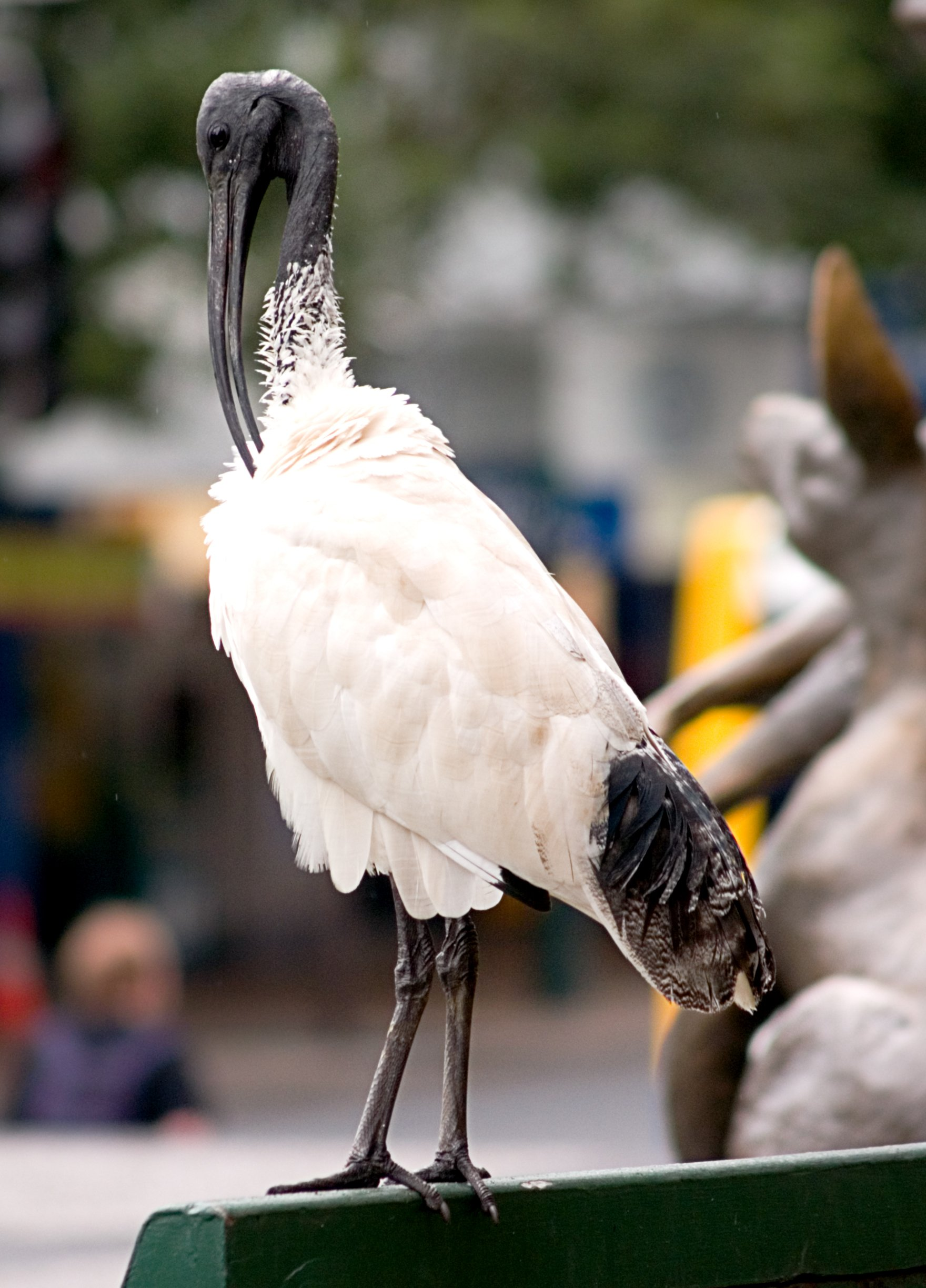
An Australian White Ibis in Brisbane preening its feathers.

Brisbane is home to a larger number of plant, animal and insect species than any other capital city in Australia. This is primarily a result of the strong floral presence of the city, particularly in urban areas, contributing to the subtropical landscape and biodiversity. Both native and exotic species are common and a tree canopy covers 44% of the 1,338 square kilometre government area. This 'urban forest' stores an estimated 1.9 million tonnes of carbon, removing 1.45 million tonnes of carbon dioxide per year. This is the equivalent of 10% of the city's annual emissions. Moreover, the city's 2500 species of flora are home to more than 550 fauna vertebrate and many invertebrate species. Specifically, the area is home to the Australian magpie, the masked lapwing, torresian crow and noisy miner, all of whom have swooping tendencies and are irritants to residents of the city. Moreover, the Australian bush turkey is a feature of the city's fauna, preying on insects and grubs in woodland habitats and suburban gardens and spreading native flora vegetation through their faeces. This native bird contrasts the white ibis, an increasing public nuisance due to increasing populations living in the swampy, water-covered wetlands of Moreton Bay. Another feature of Brisbane's ecological landscape is the flying-fox, the largest flying mammal in the world. Often mistaken as bats, they are a nocturnal native species to Australia who are integral to the reproduction, regeneration and dispersal of plant seeds in the Brisbane catchment area. There are three species of flying-fox in Brisbane: the black flying-fox, little red flying-fox and grey-headed flying-fox.

Brisbane is located within the South East Queensland biogeographic region. The city contains several iconic tree species, such as the Moreton Bay fig, a very large evergreen banyan with imposing buttress roots. It is named for the region and trees are often lit with decorative lights in the inner city. Another prominent Brisbane tree species is the jacaranda, a subtropical tree native to South America which lines avenues and parks throughout Brisbane. In October, the trees bloom with bright purple flowers and this is referred to locally as 'jacaranda season'. Some of the banks of the Brisbane River and Moreton Bay are home to mangrove wetlands.

Brisbane is home to numerous bird species, with common species including rainbow lorikeets, galahs, Australian white ibises, Australian brushturkeys, Torresian crows, Australian magpies and noisy miners. Common reptiles include common garden skinks, Australian water dragons, bearded dragons and blue-tongued lizards. The Brisbane River is home to many fish species including yellowfin bream, flathead, Australasian snapper, and bull sharks. The waters of Moreton Bay are home to dugongs, humpback whales, dolphins, mud crabs, soldier crabs and Moreton Bay bugs.

== Topography ==
Although Brisbane is dominated by low-lying flood plains throughout Moreton Bay, a number of the city's suburbs are situated on large hills. The western edge of the Brisbane area sits atop the Herbert Taylor Range, including suburbs around and including Mount Coot-tha, Enoggera, Moggill and Chapel Hill. Mount Coot-tha in particular is 300 metres above sea-level and is a dominant landmark for the area, providing a clear view of most of the city and floodplain.

The city of Brisbane is hilly. The urban area, including the central business district, are partially elevated by spurs of the Herbert Taylor Range, such as the summit of Mount Coot-tha and the smaller Enoggera Hill. The D'Aguilar National Park, encompassing the D'Aguilar Range, bounds the north-west Brisbane's of built-up area, and contains the taller peaks of Mount Nebo, Camp Mountain, Mount Pleasant, Mount Glorious, Mount Samson and Mount Mee. Other prominent rises in Brisbane are Mount Gravatt and nearby Toohey Mountain. Mount Petrie at 170 m (560 ft) and the lower rises of Highgate Hill, Mount Ommaney, Stephens Mountain, and Whites Hill are dotted across the city.

=== Regions and parklands ===
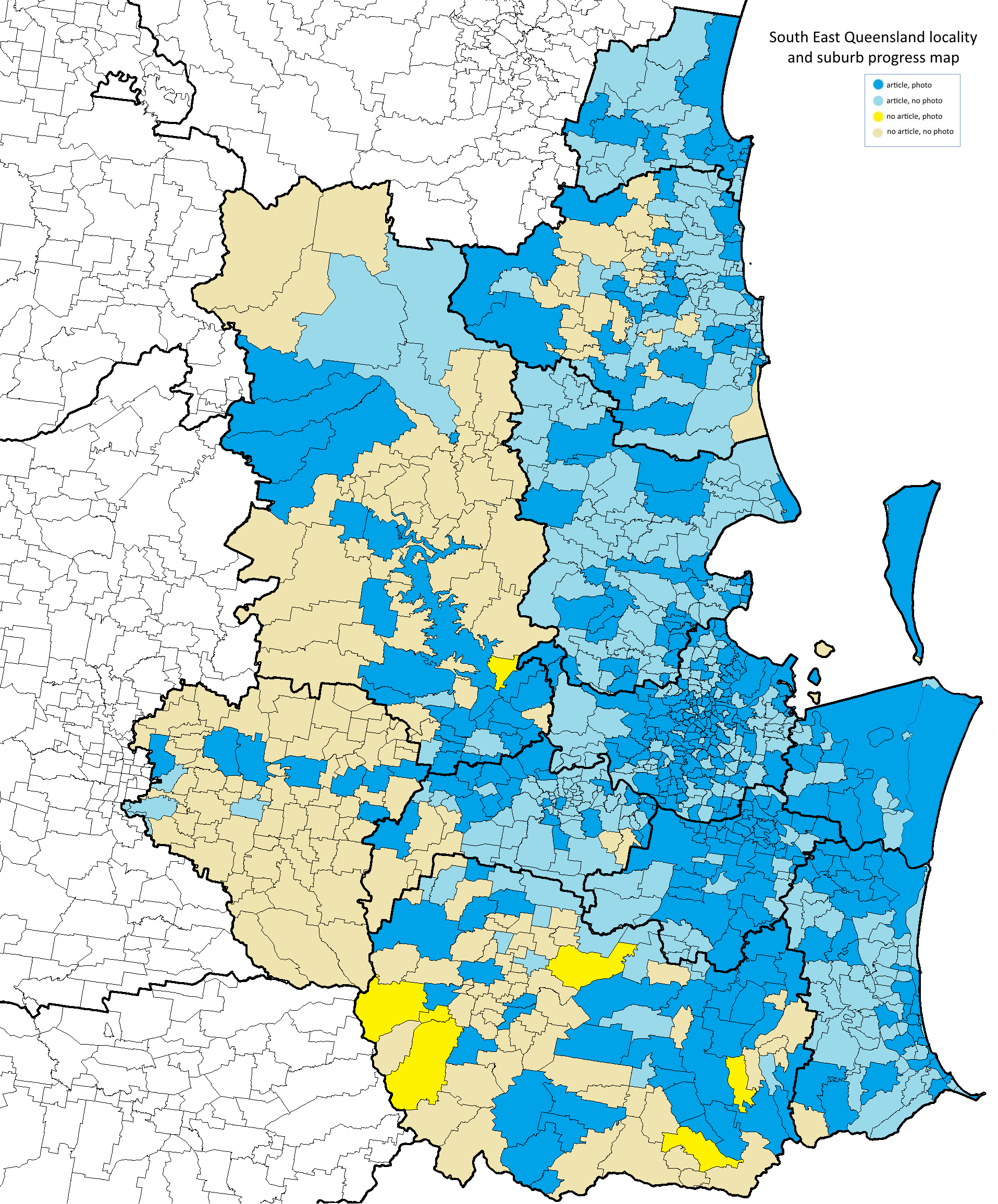
Map of South East Queensland localities and suburbs.

Brisbane is part of the South East Queensland region.

Brisbane's metropolitan area is broadly and colloquially divided into the 'northside' and the 'southside', with the dividing line being the Brisbane River, as crossing one of the fifteen bridges across the river is required to travel to the opposite side by land transport. This results in many areas which are south of the CBD being classified as located in the 'northside', and vice versa, as a result of the river's winding trajectory. In addition to being classified as located on the 'northside' or 'southside' there are further broad and colloquial regions such as the 'westside' for some areas to the southwest of the CBD and the 'bayside' for areas located on the coast of Moreton Bay.

Brisbane's major parklands include the riverside City Botanic Gardens at Gardens Point, Roma Street Parkland, the 27-hectare Victoria Park at Spring Hill and Herston, South Bank Parklands along the river at South Bank, the Brisbane Botanic Gardens at Mount Coot-tha and the riverside New Farm Park at New Farm.

There are many national parks surrounding the Brisbane metropolitan area. The D'Aguilar National Park is a major national park along the northwest of the metropolitan area in the D'Aguilar Range. The Glass House Mountains National Park is located to the north of the metropolitan area in the Glass House Mountains and provides green space between the Brisbane metropolitan area and the Sunshine Coast. The Tamborine National Park at Tamborine Mountain is located in the Gold Coast hinterland to the south of the metropolitan area.

The eastern metropolitan area is built along the Moreton Bay Marine Park, encompassing Moreton Bay. Significant areas of Moreton, North Stradbroke and Bribie islands also covered by the Moreton Island National Park, Naree Budjong Djara National Park and the Bribie Island National Park respectively. The Boondall Wetlands in the suburb of Boondall include 1100 hectares of wetlands which are home to mangroves and shorebirds as well as walking tracks.

There are a number of neighbourhoods, locations, districts and areas that divide the city's urban areas. These include the Brisbane City Centre serving as the Central Business District (CBD), the South Bank area with a leisurely land-use, the Riverside Precinct edged by the Brisbane River and the Manly District on the harbour which is predominantly residential. Furthermore, Fortitude Valley, New Farm and Chinatown Districts all carry historical significance being named after HMAS Fortitude and also a cultural landmark with an array of authentic Chinese and Cantonese cuisine. Kangaroo Point and Woolloongabba Districts encompass more residential suburbs, with people friendly parks and green areas as well as the Brisbane Cricket Club. Milton, Paddington, Rosalie and Spring Hill Districts have the highest concentration of hotels, popular restaurants and cafes with large parkland areas as the city transitions from the inner city built-up areas to the surrounding bush lands. Additionally, the Pacific Ocean to the east of the city contains Moreton Island, Peel Island, St. Helena Island and Cleveland, all of which are part of the large national park that encompasses the waters. They are popular regions for scuba diving with stunning beaches and lakes, large amounts of wildlife and impressive ecological systems on the coral reeves that surround them

=== Moreton Bay ===
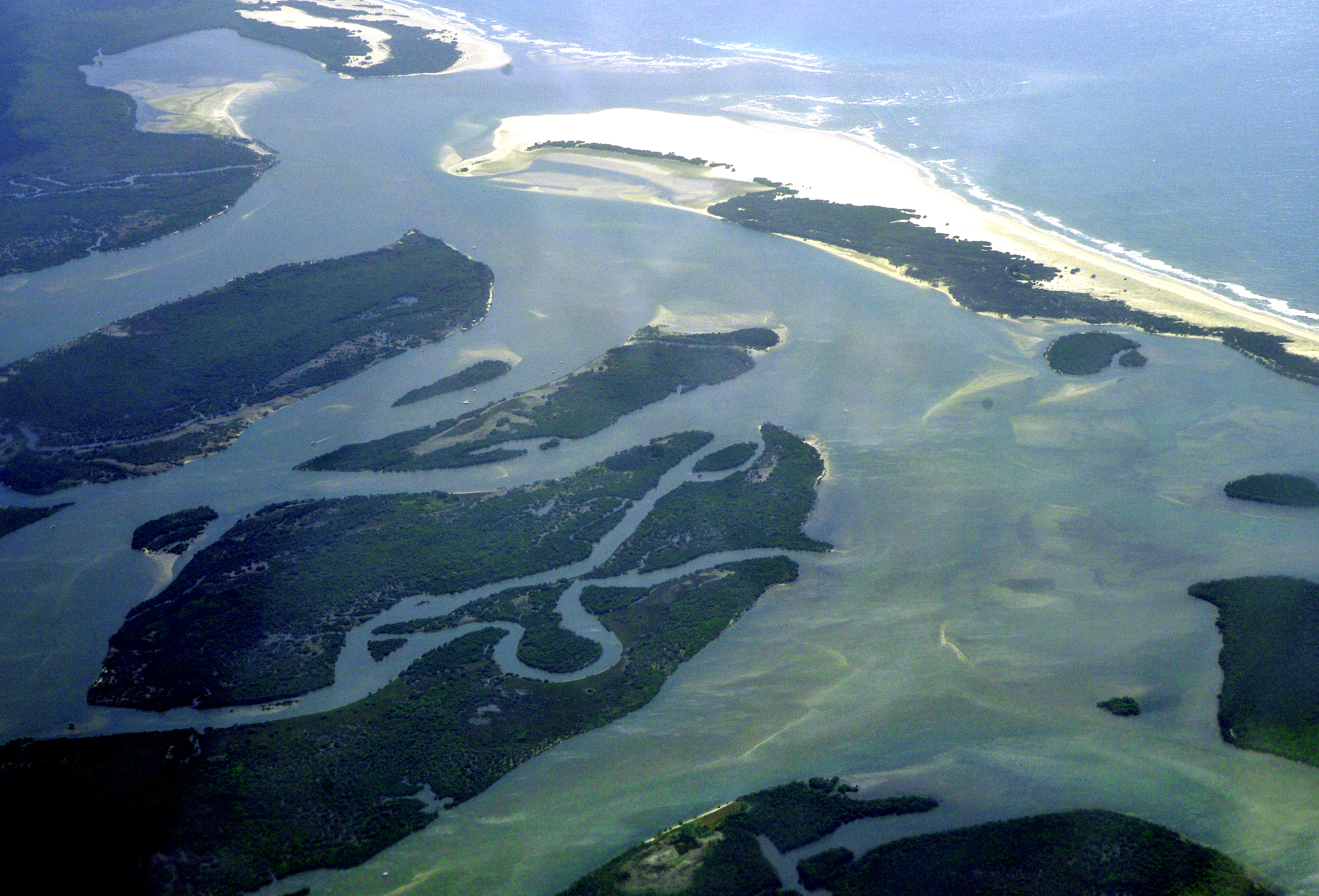
Aerial view of the Jumpinpin bar, South Standbroke Island, Moreton Bay, Queensland, Australia

Moreton Bay is one of Queensland's most important natural resources that stretches 125 kilometres from Caloundra in the north to Surfers Paradise in the south. It is the entrance to the Brisbane River and is separated from the Coral Sea by Moreton Island, North Stradbroke Island and South Stradbroke Island, all of which are located off the east coast of the Brisbane area. The bay itself is 35 kilometres across at its widest point contains 360 small islands, including protected intertidal wetlands, muddy inhabitants on the west side, sandy inhabitant on the east side as well as coral and seagrass beds throughout. Furthermore, the bay area supports more than 25% of Australia's bird species, making the bay an Important Bird Area (IBA) as classified by BirdLife International.

The waters of Moreton Bay are relatively calm, being sheltered from large swells by Moreton, Stradbroke and Bribie islands, whereas unsheltered surf beaches lie on the eastern coasts of the bay islands and on the Gold Coast and Sunshine Coast to the north and south. The southern part of Moreton Bay also contains smaller islands such as St Helena Island, Peel Island, Coochiemudlo Island, Russell Island, Lamb Island and Macleay Island.

=== The Scenic Rim ===
Located to the south west of the Brisbane city area, the scenic rim consists of three major dormant volcanos to the west of the Brisbane River. These volcanoes now make up the highlands that include Toowoomba, Cunningham's Gap and Mt Superbus, and were once three of the largest shield volcanoes to exist on the planet. The altitudinal change throughout the area ranges from 300 to 1500 metres above sea level, creating cooler temperatures. As a result, the areas to the base of the mountains are dominated by warm, subtropical rainforests, which progress into cool, temperate rainforests developing as the altitude increases and temperature drops.

== Climate ==
Brisbane has a humid subtropical climate. This is characterised by warm sunny weather, mild balmy evenings and a generally constant weather pattern annually. Average maximum and minimum temperatures annually are 25.5 degrees Celsius and 15.7 degrees Celsius respectively, with the region's relatively close proximity to the coral sea and Pacific Ocean resulting in overall variance in temperatures annually to be far less than other capital cities. This is primarily due to the area's proximity to these warmer ocean currents. Brisbane has only recorded a sub zero minimum temperature once (at night).

Mean Temperature Statistics 1887–1986
Statistics	Jan	Feb	Mar	Apr	May	Jun	Jul	Aug	Sep	Oct	Nov	Dec	Annually
Mean Maximum Temperatures (Degrees Celsius)	29.4	29.0	28.0	26.1	23.2	20.9	20.4	21.8	24	26.1	27.8	29.1	25.5
Mean Minimum Temperatures (Degrees Celsius	20.7	20.6	19.4	16.6	13.3	10.9	9.5	10.3	12.9	15.8	18.1	19.8	15.7

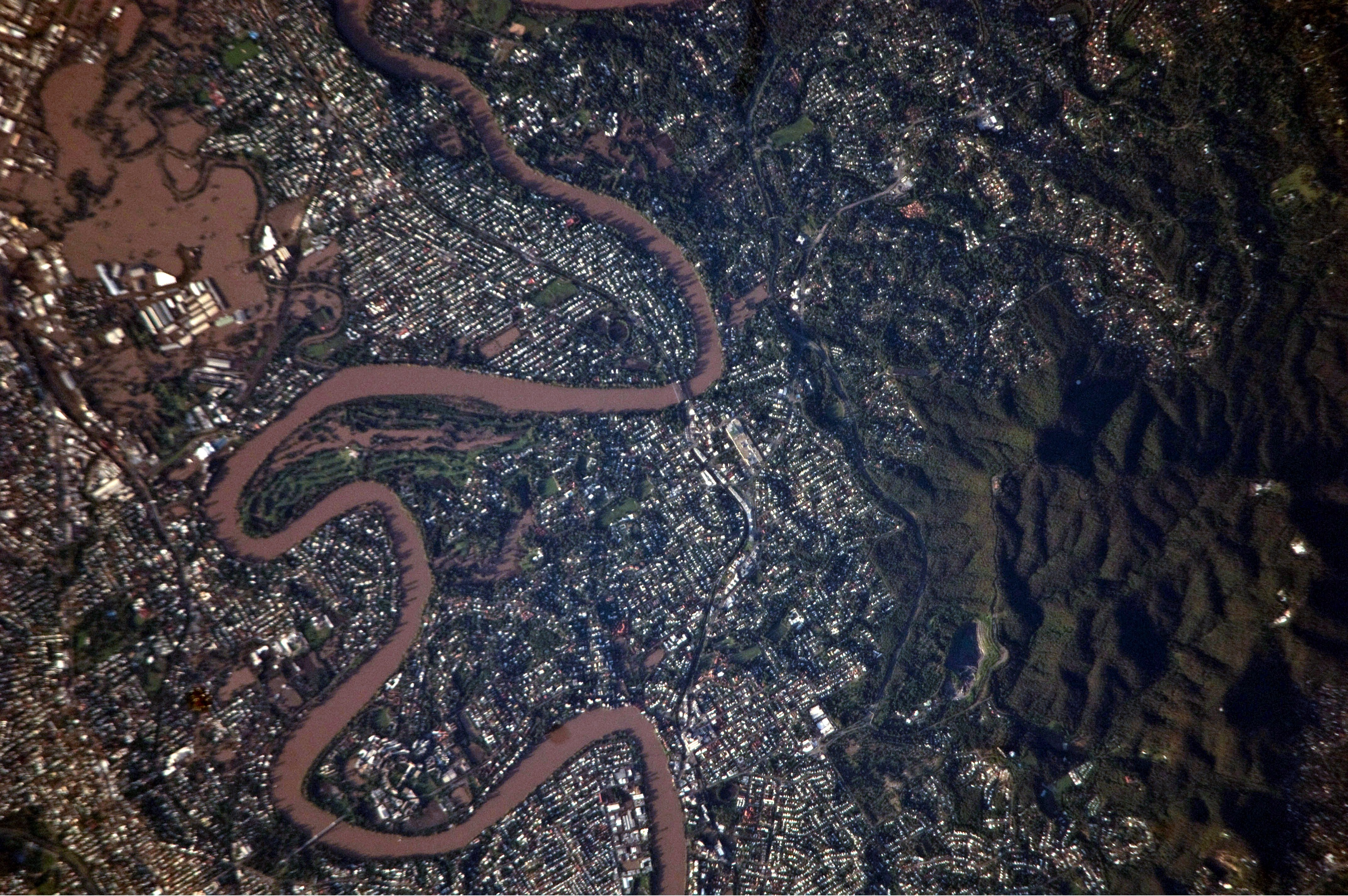
This detailed satellite photograph illustrates flooding in metropolitan suburbs of Brisbane, Queensland, Australia. Please note that the top of the photo is oriented approximately to the South-West and not to the North. The image was taken by astronauts on board the International Space Station.

In terms of precipitation, thunderstorms are extremely common with severe weather such as hail storms, torrential rain and destructive winds occurring annually. The region averages 124 clear days a year, with an average rainfall of 142 millimetres per annum. Despite this, the floodplain has also been subject to prolonged periods of extreme drought, such as between 2001 and 2010 when dam levels dropped to 16.7% in August 2007. Residents were forced to obey level 6 water usage restrictions causing per capita water usage to fall below 140 litres per day, the lowest usage per person of any country in the developed world at that time. This severe dry period was broken in January 2011 when a low pressure system crossed Brisbane's northern area, saturating the catchment area and causing flash flooding. In general, the region consistently receives rainfall, with the longest period without recorded rainfall occurring in November 2011 for 22 days.

Mean Precipitation Statistics 1887–1986
Statistics	Jan	Feb	Mar	Apr	May	Jun	Jul	Aug	Sep	Oct	Nov	Dec	Annually
Mean Rainfall (mm)	159.6	158.3	140.7	92.5	73.7	67.8	56.5	45.9	45.7	75.4	97.0	133.3	1148.8
Mean Number of Days of rain > 1mm	8.4	8.8	9.4	6.8	5.8	4.5	4.2	4.0	4.4	5.9	6.5	7.7	76.4

== See also ==
- Demographics of Brisbane
- Flora of Brisbane
