= Actiomera =

Scientific classification
- Domain: Eukaryota
- Kingdom: Animalia
- Phylum: Arthropoda
- Class: Malacostraca
- Order: Decapoda
- Suborder: Pleocyemata
- Infraorder: Brachyura
- Family: Xanthidae
- Subfamily: Liomerinae
- Genus: Actiomera; Ng, Guinot & Davie, 2008

Genus of crabs

Actiomera is a genus of crabs in the family Xanthidae, containing the following species:

- Actiomera boninensis (Odhner, 1925)
- Actiomera erythra (Lanchester, 1902)
- Actiomera lophopa (Alcock, 1898)
