= Edwardsium =

Scientific classification
- Domain: Eukaryota
- Kingdom: Animalia
- Phylum: Arthropoda
- Class: Malacostraca
- Order: Decapoda
- Suborder: Pleocyemata
- Infraorder: Brachyura
- Family: Xanthidae
- Subfamily: Euxanthinae
- Genus: Edwardsium; Guinot, 1967

Genus of crabs

Edwardsium is a genus of crabs in the family Xanthidae, containing the following species:

- Edwardsium crockeri (Glassell, 1936)
- Edwardsium crosslandi (Finnegan, 1931)
- Edwardsium lobipes (Rathbun, 1898)
- Edwardsium spinimanum (H. Milne-Edwards, 1834)
