= Microcassiope =

Scientific classification
- Kingdom: Animalia
- Phylum: Arthropoda
- Class: Malacostraca
- Order: Decapoda
- Suborder: Pleocyemata
- Infraorder: Brachyura
- Family: Xanthidae
- Genus: Microcassiope; Guinot, 1967

Genus of crabs

Microcassiope is a genus of crabs in the family Xanthidae, containing the following species:

- Microcassiope granulimana (Stimpson, 1871)
- Microcassiope minor (Dana, 1852)
- Microcassiope orientalis Takeda & Miyake, 1969
- Microcassiope taboguillensis (Rathbun, 1907)
- Microcassiope xantusii (Stimpson, 1871)
