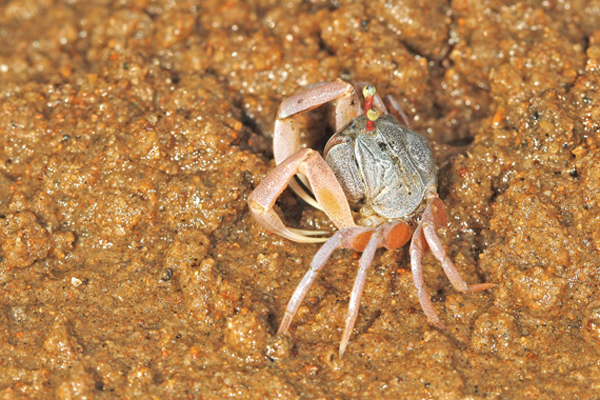
- Dotilla myctiroides from Devbagh, Karwar, India

Scientific classification
- Domain: Eukaryota
- Kingdom: Animalia
- Phylum: Arthropoda
- Class: Malacostraca
- Order: Decapoda
- Suborder: Pleocyemata
- Infraorder: Brachyura
- Family: Dotillidae
- Genus: Dotilla
- Species: D. myctiroides

Binomial name
- Dotilla myctiroides (H. Milne-Edwards, 1852)

= Dotilla myctiroides =

Species of crab

Dotilla myctiroides is a species of sand bubbler crab found on tropical shores and mud-flats of India, Thailand, Malaysia, Indonesia, Singapore and Sri Lanka. They breed throughout the year but activity peaks during the monsoons. This species builds a burrow, called an "igloo", in unstable sand as well as in well-drained and firm sand. In building the igloo, the crab excavates sand and forms it into spherical pellets. These pellets are used to form a circular wall and roof in the burrow. The resulting structure holds a small amount of air in addition to the crab itself.

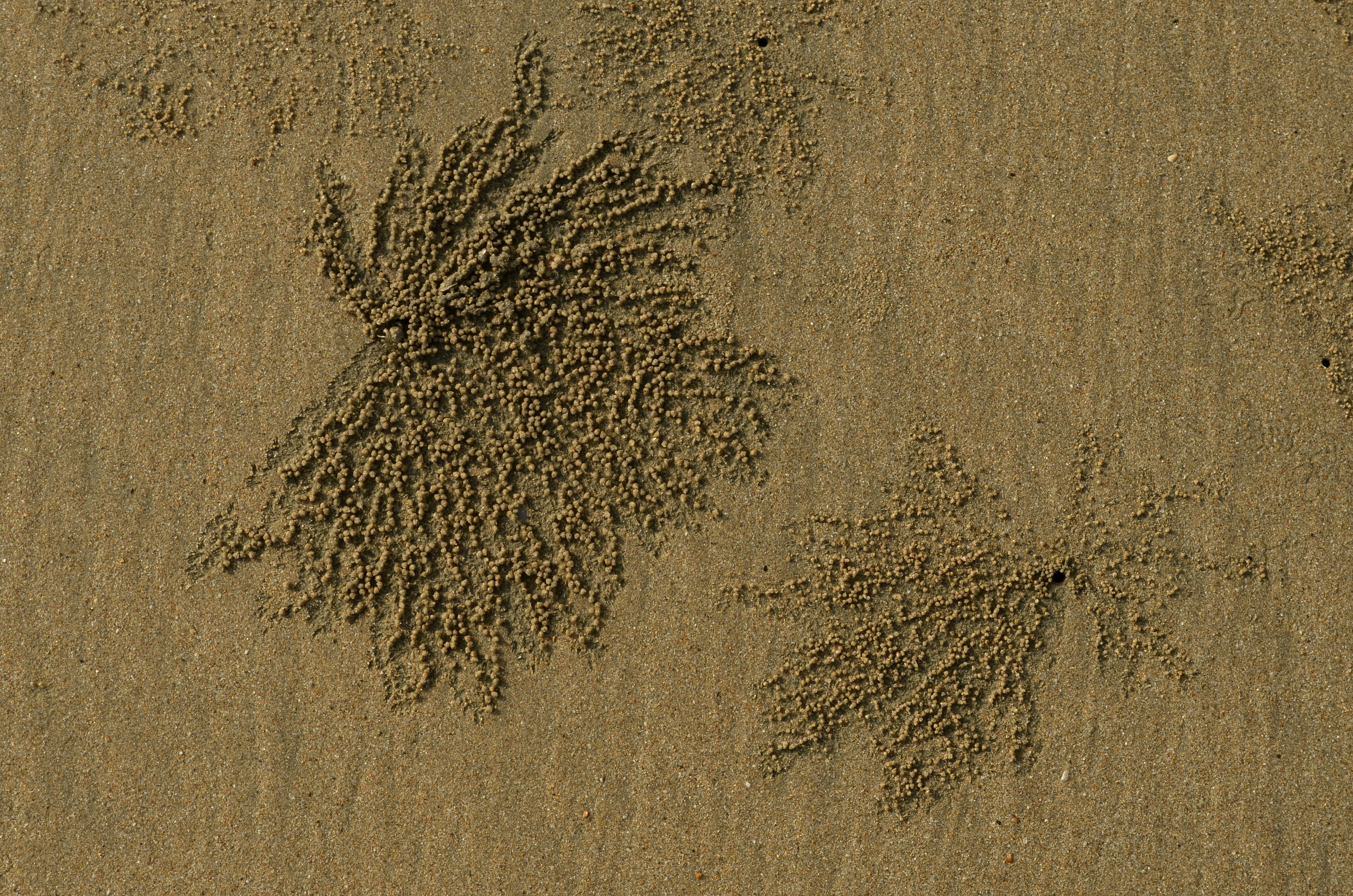
"Sun-burst" of sand beads prepared by the soldier crab
