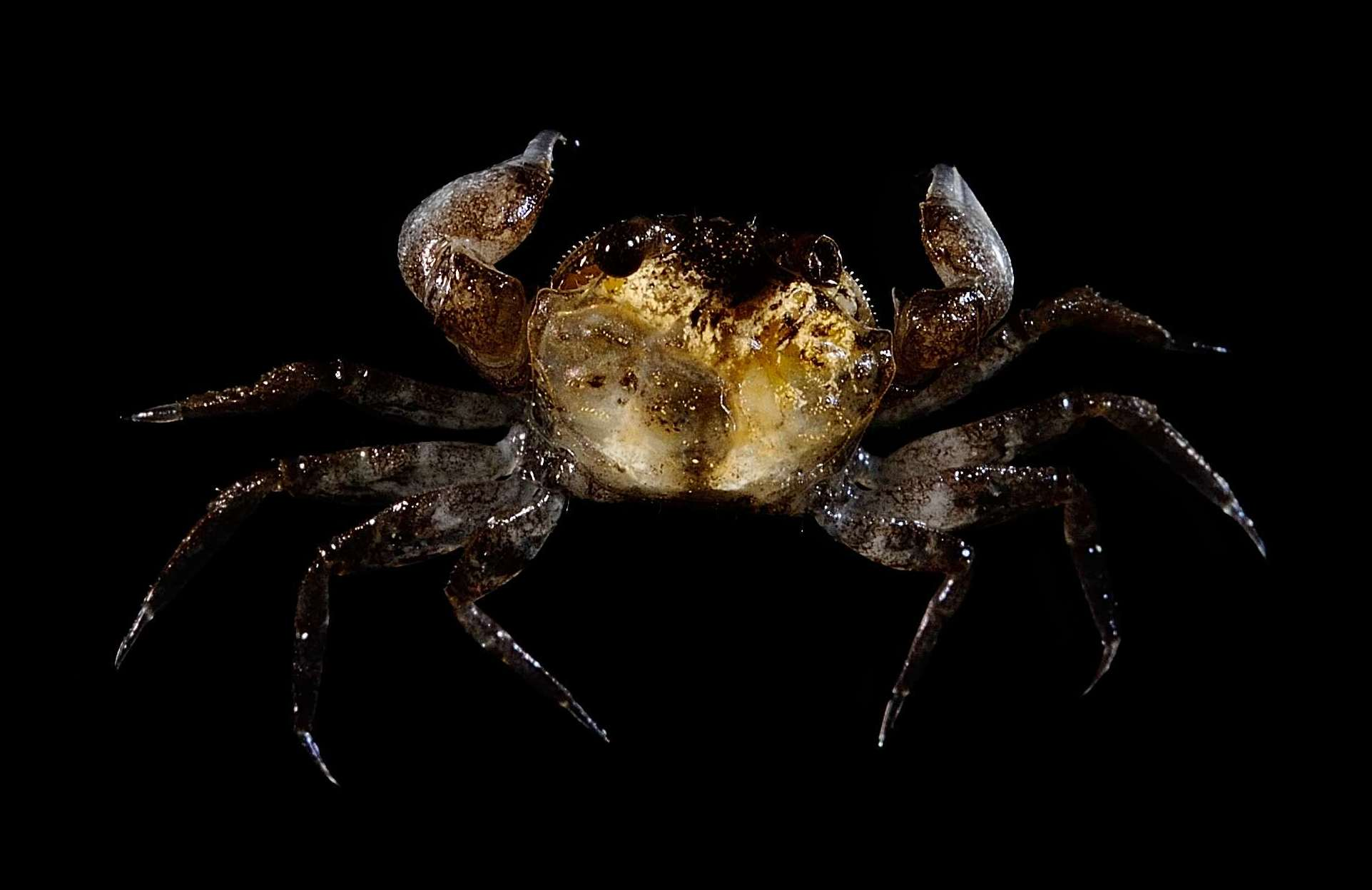
- Ilyoplax

Scientific classification
- Kingdom: Animalia
- Phylum: Arthropoda
- Class: Malacostraca
- Order: Decapoda
- Suborder: Pleocyemata
- Infraorder: Brachyura
- Family: Dotillidae
- Genus: Ilyoplax; Stimpson, 1858

= Ilyoplax =

Genus of crabs

Ilyoplax is a genus of crab. It contains the following species:

- Ilyoplax danielae Davie & Naruse, 2010
- Ilyoplax delsmani De Man, 1926
- Ilyoplax dentata Ward, 1933
- Ilyoplax dentimerosa Shen, 1932
- Ilyoplax deschampsi (Rathbun, 1913)
- Ilyoplax formosensis Rathbun, 1921
- Ilyoplax frater (Kemp, 1919)
- Ilyoplax gangetica (Kemp, 1919)
- Ilyoplax integra (Tesch, 1918)
- Ilyoplax lingulata (Rathbun, 1909)
- Ilyoplax longicarpa Tweedie, 1937
- Ilyoplax ningpoensis Shen, 1940
- Ilyoplax obliqua Tweedie, 1935
- Ilyoplax orientalis (De Man, 1888)
- Ilyoplax pacifica Kitaura & Wada, 2006
- Ilyoplax philippinensis (Rathbun, 1914)
- Ilyoplax pingi Shen, 1932
- Ilyoplax punctata Tweedie, 1935
- Ilyoplax pusilla (De Haan, 1835)
- Ilyoplax sayajiraoi JN Trivedi, Soni, DJ Trivedi & Vachhrajani, 2015
- Ilyoplax serrata Shen, 1931
- Ilyoplax spinimera Tweedie, 1950
- Ilyoplax stapletoni (De Man, 1908)
- Ilyoplax stevensi (Kemp, 1919)
- Ilyoplax strigicarpus Davie, 1990
- Ilyoplax tansuiensis Sakai, 1939
- Ilyoplax tenella Stimpson, 1858
- Ilyoplax yuhana Rathbun, 1931
