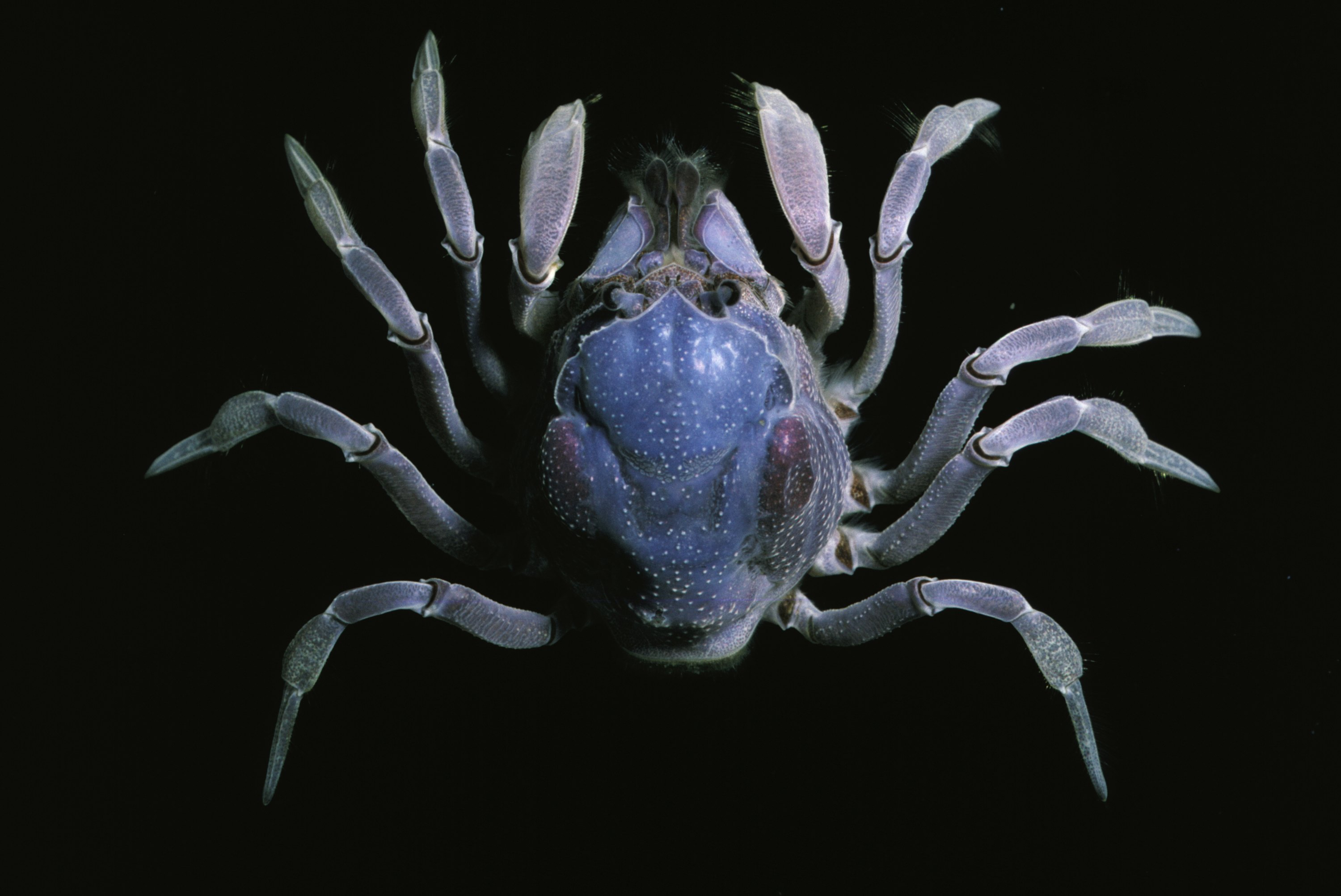

Scientific classification
- Kingdom: Animalia
- Phylum: Arthropoda
- Class: Malacostraca
- Order: Decapoda
- Suborder: Pleocyemata
- Infraorder: Brachyura
- Family: Mictyridae
- Genus: Mictyris
- Species: M. platycheles

Binomial name
- Mictyris platycheles H. Milne-Edwards, 1852

= Mictyris platycheles =

Species of crab

Mictyris platycheles is a species of crab found on mudflats on the east coast of Australia from Tasmania and Victoria to Queensland. They live in large groups, so are commonly called soldier crabs. Adults are 15 mm (0.59 in) across and similarly tall, and are coloured blue to blue-grey. Mictyris platycheles gets its food by putting balls of sand in its mouth, which filters out the food particles (detritus).
