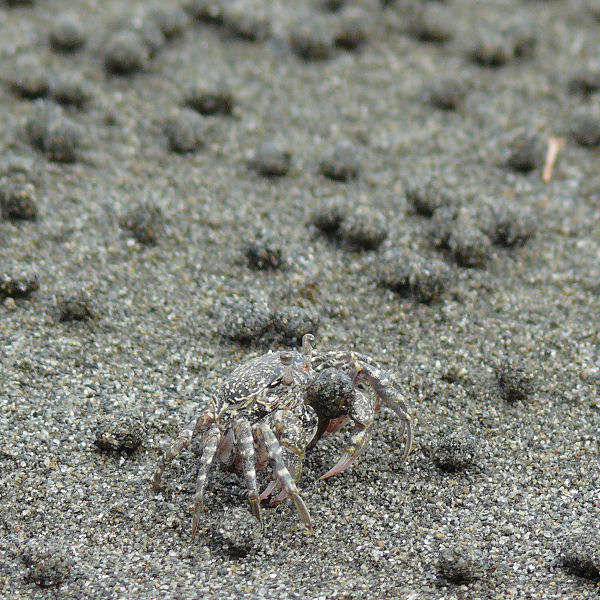
- Scopimera globosa

Scientific classification
- Kingdom: Animalia
- Phylum: Arthropoda
- Subphylum: Crustacea
- Class: Malacostraca
- Order: Decapoda
- Infraorder: Brachyura
- Family: Dotillidae
- Genus: Scopimera; De Haan, 1833; Dotilla; Stimpson, 1858

Species
- See text

= Sand bubbler crab =

Genus of crabs

Sand bubbler crabs (or sand-bubblers) are crabs of the genera Scopimera and Dotilla in the family Dotillidae. They are small crabs that live on sandy beaches in the tropical Indo-Pacific. They feed by filtering sand through their mouthparts, leaving behind balls of sand that are broken up by the incoming high tide.

== Description ==
Sand bubbler crabs are small crabs, around 1 cm (0.4 in) across the carapace, and they are characterised by the presence of "gas windows" on the merus of the legs; in Dotilla, these windows are also present on the thoracic sternites. A similar system has evolved in parallel in the porcelain crab genus Petrolisthes.

== Distribution ==
Sand bubbler crabs are widespread across the Indo-Pacific region, where they occur abundantly on sandy beaches in the tropics and sub-tropics.

== Ecology and behaviour ==
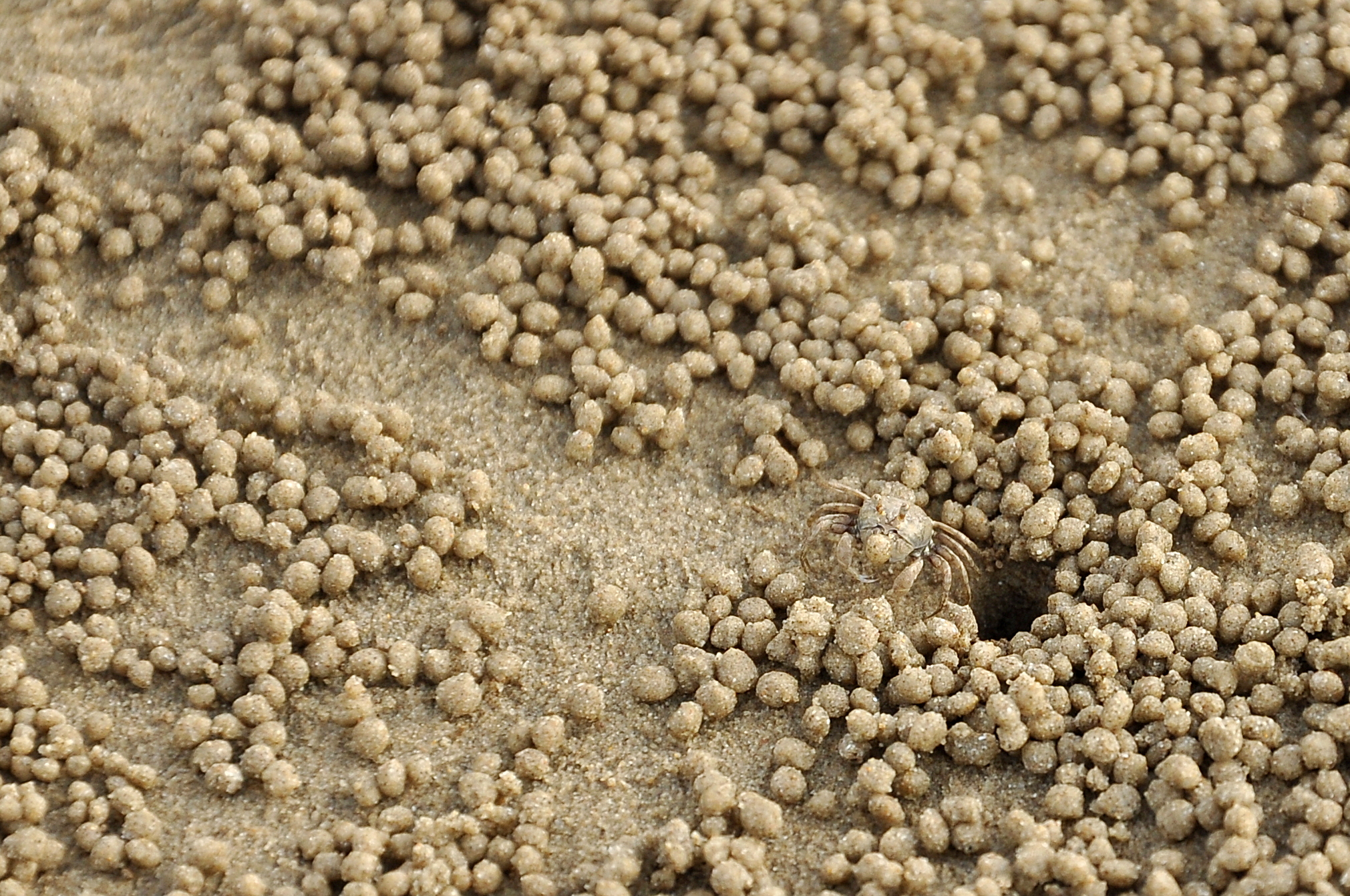
Scopimera globosa and the sand pellets it has made

Sand bubbler crabs live in burrows in the sand, where they remain during high tide. When the tide is out, they emerge on to the surface of the sand, and pass the sand through their mouthparts, eating detritus and plankton, and discarding the processed sand as pellets, which cover the beach. The crabs work radially from the entrance to their burrows, which they re-enter as the tide rises and disintegrates the pellets. In each burrow, the crab waits out the high tide in a bubble of air. The material consumed by sand bubbler crabs has a very low concentration of organic matter, which is concentrated by egestion of indigestible material.

== Taxonomy ==
=== Taxonomic history ===
The first sand bubbler crab to be described was Cancer sulcatus (now Dotilla sulcata) by Peter Forsskål in 1775. The genus Scopimera was originally described as a subgenus of Ocypode by Wilhem de Haan in 1833, although the first species, Scopimera globosa was not validly described until 1835. At the same time, De Haan tried to erect the genus Doto for Forskål's Cancer sulcatus, not realising that the name was preoccupied by the mollusc genus Doto. The first available name for that genus was published by William Stimpson in 1858, who called it Dotilla. Ongoing revisions are likely to split the current genus Scopimera into at least two genera.

=== Species ===
Eight species of Dotilla and fifteen of Scopimera are currently recognised:

- Dotilla
  - Dotilla blanfordi Alcock, 1900
  - Dotilla fenestrata Hilgendorf, 1869
  - Dotilla intermedia De Man, 1888
  - Dotilla malabarica Nobili, 1903
  - Dotilla myctiroides (H. Milne-Edwards, 1852)
  - Dotilla pertinax Kemp, 1915
  - Dotilla sulcata (Forskål, 1775)
  - Dotilla wichmanni De Man, 1892
- Scopimera
  - Scopimera bitympana Shen, 1930
  - Scopimera crabicauda Alcock, 1900
  - Scopimera curtelsoma Shen, 1936
  - Scopimera globosa (De Haan, 1835)
  - Scopimera gordonae Serène & Moosa, 1981
  - Scopimera inflata A. Milne-Edwards, 1873
  - Scopimera intermedia Balss, 1934
  - Scopimera investigatoris Alcock, 1900
  - Scopimera kochi Roux, 1917
  - Scopimera longidactyla Shen, 1932
  - Scopimera philippinensis Wong, Shih & Chan, 2011
  - Scopimera pilula Kemp, 1919
  - Scopimera proxima Kemp, 1919
  - Scopimera sheni Wong, Shih & Chan, 2011
  - Scopimera sigillorum (Rathbun, 1914)
