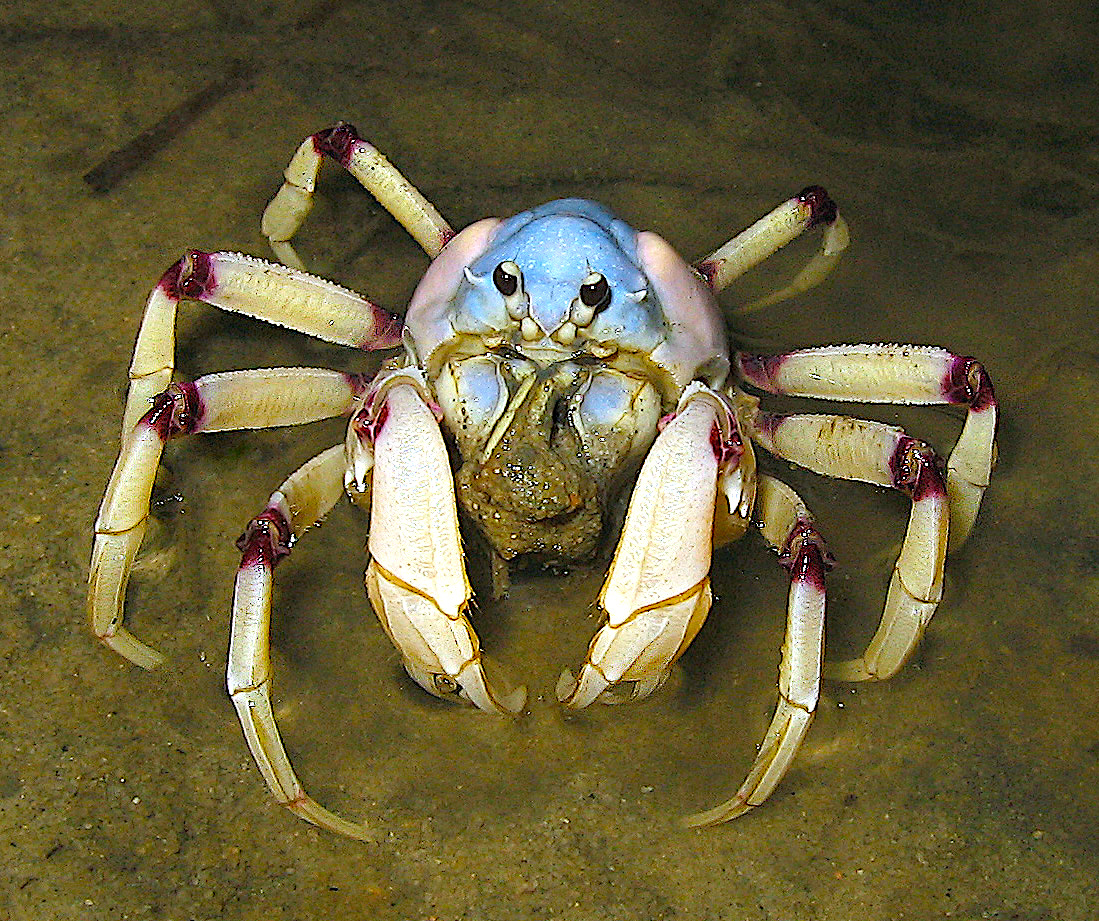

Scientific classification
- Kingdom: Animalia
- Phylum: Arthropoda
- Clade: Pancrustacea
- Class: Malacostraca
- Order: Decapoda
- Suborder: Pleocyemata
- Infraorder: Brachyura
- Family: Mictyridae
- Genus: Mictyris
- Species: M. longicarpus

Binomial name
- Mictyris longicarpus Latreille, 1806

= Mictyris longicarpus =

Soldier Crab

Species of crab

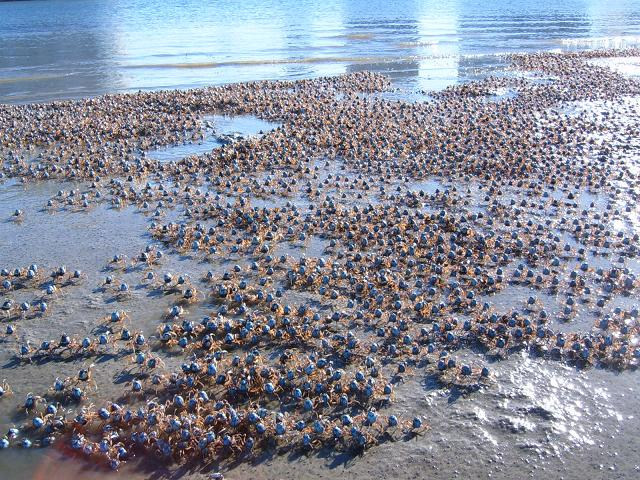
"Army" of Mictyris longicarpus

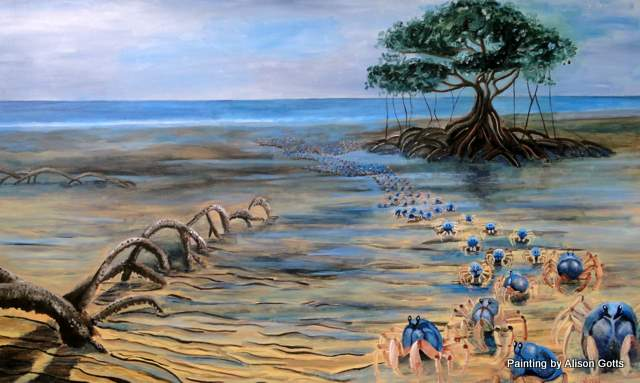
Artist impression of Mictyris longicarpus marching across a mangrove flat

Mictyris longicarpus, the light-blue soldier crab, is a species of crab that lives on sandy beaches from the Bay of Bengal to Australia; with other members of the genus Mictyris, it is "one of the most loved crabs in Australia". Adults are 25 mm (1 in) across, white, with blue on their backs, and hold their claws vertically. They feed on detritus in the sand, leaving rounded pellets of discarded sand behind them. The males may form into large "armies" which traverse the beach at low tide, before the crabs dig into the sand to wait for the next low tide.

== Description ==
Mictyris longicarpus is nearly spherical, with an upright body. Its carapace is powder blue, with the rest of the body being white except for purple patches on the joints of the legs. The chelae (claws) are slim and curve downwards, and are held vertically in front of the crab. Given the crab's upright posture, the eyestalks are short. The body is up to 25 mm (0.98 in) across, or "about the size of a cherry".

== Distribution ==
Mictyris longicarpus is found from Singapore and the Bay of Bengal to New Caledonia and Australia, reaching as far south as Perth, Western Australia in the west, and around the coast of Queensland and New South Wales to Wilsons Promontory, Victoria.

== Ecology ==
Examination of the gut contents of M. longicarpus showed that the crabs mostly feed on detritus, and any small organisms in the sand, such as diatoms, gastropod eggs, or nematodes.

Predators of adults include Threskiornis spinicollis (straw-necked ibis), Todiramphus sordidus (Torresian kingfisher), Egretta alba (great egret), Tetractenos hamiltoni (common toadfish) and Metopograpsus messor (a grapsid crab). The soldier crabs are also attacked by the ghost crab Ocypode ceratophthalma and the moon snail Conuber sordidum.

== Behaviour ==
Mictyris longicarpus spends much of the time buried in the sand. They emerge to the surface a few hours before low tide, although some individuals may remain submerged for the entire tidal cycle. The first sign that a crab may emerge is the development of "hummocks" which appear on the surface of the sand and increase in size over a period of 10–30 minutes. The number of crabs which emerge is influenced by temperature, wind and rainfall, with the different sexes responding differently, such that one day, nearly all the emerged crabs will be male, while the next day, there may be a mixture of males and females. Emergence of a population from the sand may take up to an hour, or be completed in five minutes, with the adults generally appearing before the juveniles. Upon emergence, the crab performs "the most aerobatic grooming mechanism recorded from the Brachyura"; in less than a second, the crab falls onto its back, thus removing any sand it has accumulated on the carapace, and then flips upright again in a "half somersault".

Initially, the crabs feed only tentatively, and within 15 minutes of emergence, they begin the "trek", where large numbers of crabs walk simultaneously towards the water in an almost straight line. Mictyris species are among the few crabs adapted to walking forwards, rather than sideways. Juveniles only proceed about 50 m towards the water, and feed at that level of the beach.

Having reached a suitable moist area, the crabs begin to feed rapidly, working transversely across the beach as they do so. Feeding comprises raising scoops of sand to the mouthparts, with inedible material accumulating at the base of the third maxillipeds, and drop off the crabs as round pellets. Feeding may last 1–2.5 hours, with the crabs spending less and less time feeding as they aggregate into armies. The armies are generally composed solely of males, with the largest individuals at the front, probably because their longer legs mean they walk faster. The army as a whole progresses at a speed of 10 yards per minute (0.34 mph or 0.55 km/h), continuing for 0.5–2 hours.

Eventually, the army breaks up and the individual crabs travel up the shore, and dig themselves into the sand in a unique corkscrew motion. The crabs dig down with the legs on one side of their bodies, while the legs on the other side walk backwards. They then leave this burrow, and dig another. During this period, encounters between adult males result in both males adopting the threat display (rearing up onto the last one of two pairs of legs, and stretching the other limbs out as wide as possible), after which the loser – generally the smaller crab – backs down. Eventually, the crabs remain in one of the burrows and await the next falling tide.

Michael Tweedie considered crabs of the genera Mictyris and Scopimera to show types of behaviour also seen in human society. While Scopimera crabs were caricatures of the middle class, Mictyris crabs were "cheerful bohemians, living crowded together and out-doing in unrepressed and irresponsible behavior even those human communities which aspire most strenuously towards this ideal".
