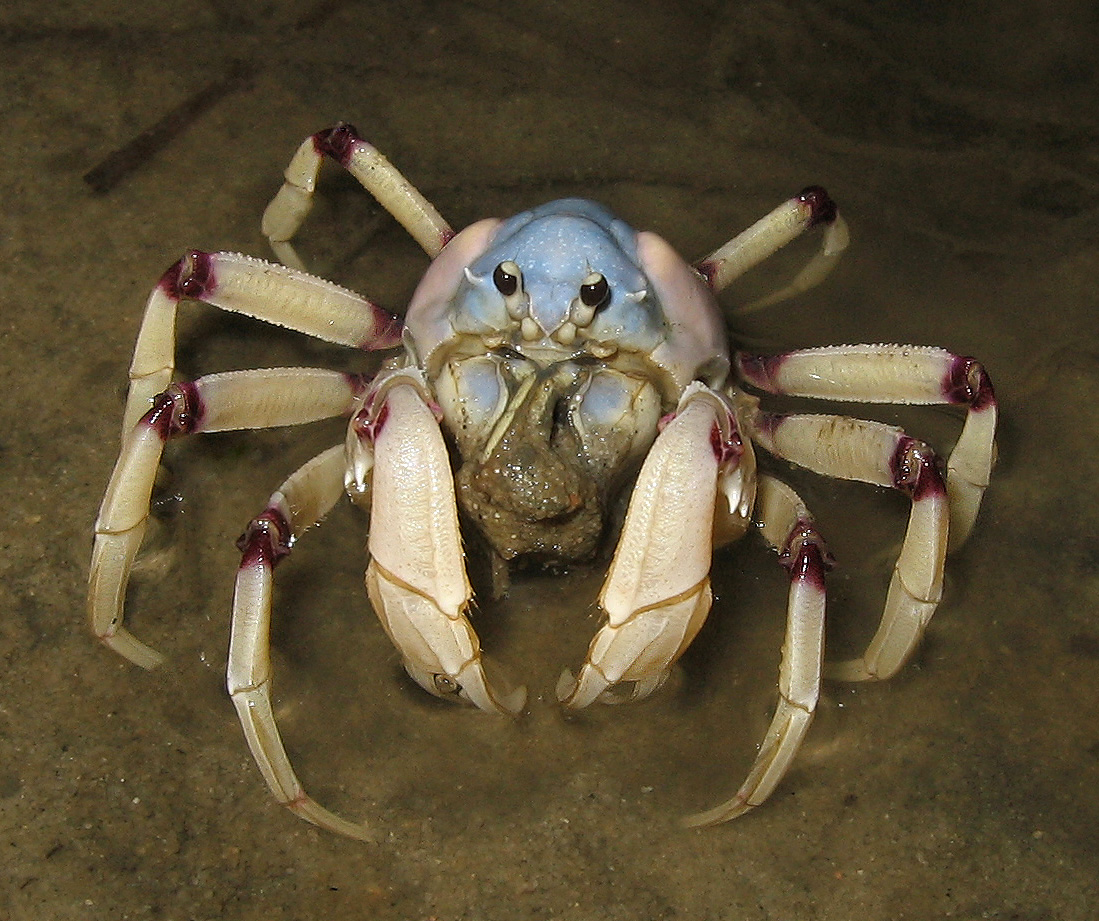
- Light-blue soldier crab, Mictyris longicarpus

Scientific classification
- Kingdom: Animalia
- Phylum: Arthropoda
- Clade: Pancrustacea
- Class: Malacostraca
- Order: Decapoda
- Suborder: Pleocyemata
- Infraorder: Brachyura
- Superfamily: Ocypodoidea
- Family: Mictyridae; Dana, 1851
- Genus: Mictyris; Latreille, 1806

= Mictyris =

Genus of crabs

Mictyris is a genus of brightly coloured crabs, placed in its own taxonomical family, the Mictyridae. It inhabits the central Indo-West Pacific region. These crabs congregate on mud flats or beaches in groups of a few thousand, and filter sand or mud for microscopic organisms. They congregate during low tide, and bury themselves in the sand during high tide or whenever they are threatened. This is done in wet sand, and they dig in a corkscrew pattern, leaving many small round pellets of sand behind them.

== Species ==
The genus contains eight species:

Image	Scientific name	Distribution
	Mictyris brevidactylus Stimpson, 1858	Japan, China (including the type location, Hong Kong), Taiwan, Singapore, and parts of Indonesia (Karakelong, Bawean and Ambon Island)
	Mictyris darwinensis Unno & Semeniuk, 2011	Australia(Kimberley to Cape York)
	Mictyris guinotae Davie et al., 2010	Ryukyu Islands of Japan
	Mictyris livingstonei McNeill, 1926	Australia
	Mictyris longicarpus Latreille, 1806	Bay of Bengal to New Caledonia and Australia
	Mictyris occidentalis Unno, 2008	Australia(King Bay, Dampier Archipelago)
	Mictyris platycheles H. Milne-Edwards, 1852	Tasmania and Australia(Victoria to Queensland)
	Mictyris thailandensis Davie, Wisespongpand & Shih, 2013	Thailand

The predictable behaviour of these crabs has led them to be used in experiments in a form of billiard ball computer.
