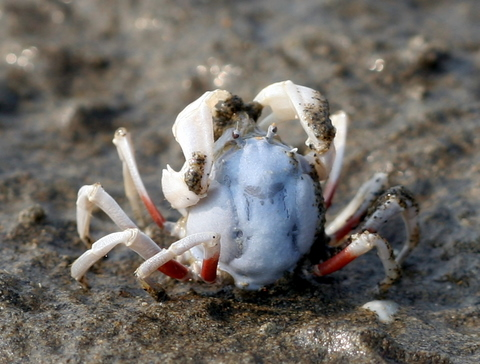

Scientific classification
- Kingdom: Animalia
- Phylum: Arthropoda
- Class: Malacostraca
- Order: Decapoda
- Suborder: Pleocyemata
- Infraorder: Brachyura
- Family: Mictyridae
- Genus: Mictyris
- Species: M. brevidactylus

Binomial name
- Mictyris brevidactylus Stimpson, 1858

= Mictyris brevidactylus =

Species of crab

Mictyris brevidactylus is a species of crab found in Japan, China (including the type location, Hong Kong), Taiwan, Singapore, and parts of Indonesia (Karakelong, Bawean and Ambon Island). The adults have a light-blue carapace and scarlet-jointed legs, while juveniles are yellowish-brown. M. brevidactylus is gregarious and burrows into the sand when disturbed, in a corkscrew motion.

== Gallery ==
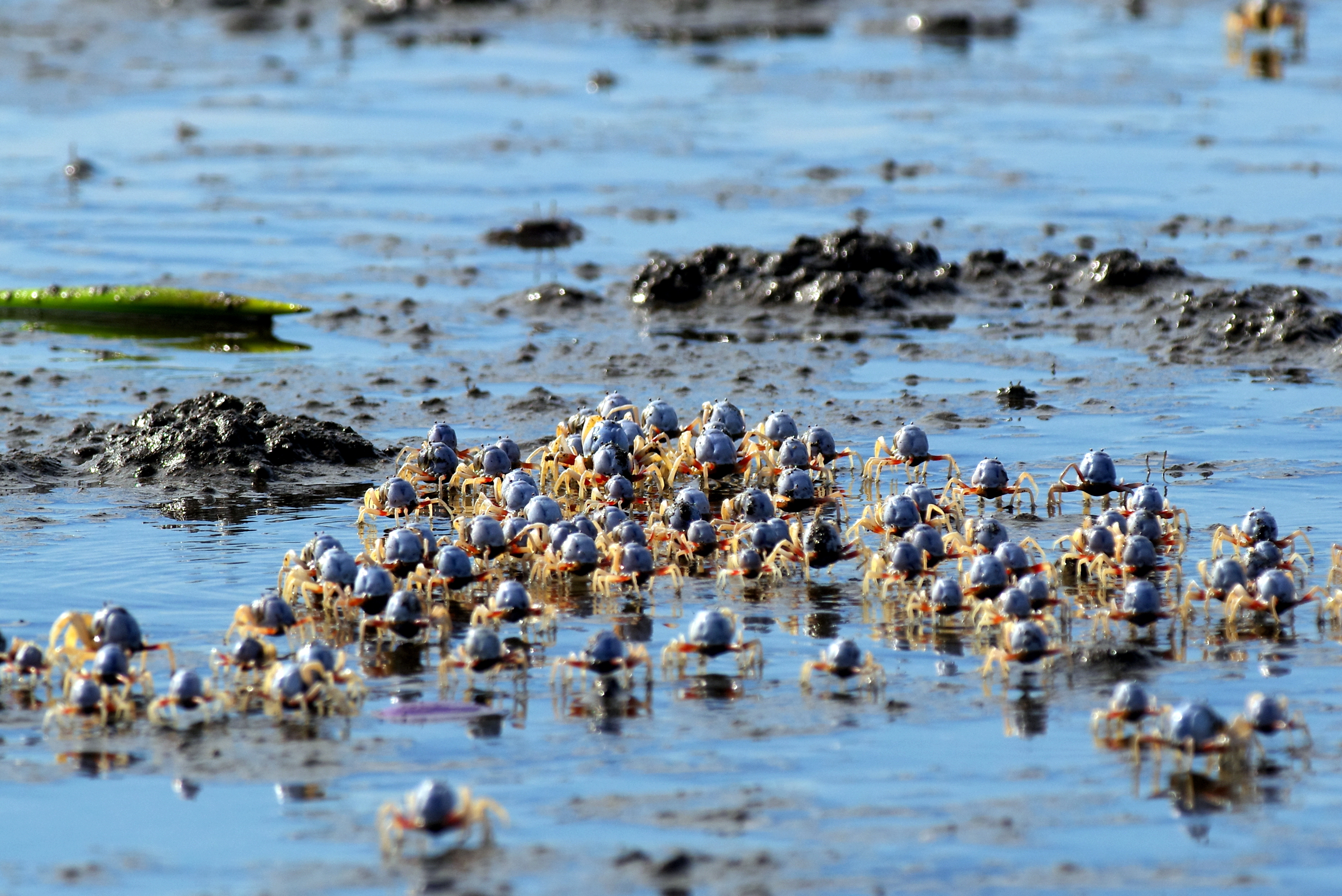

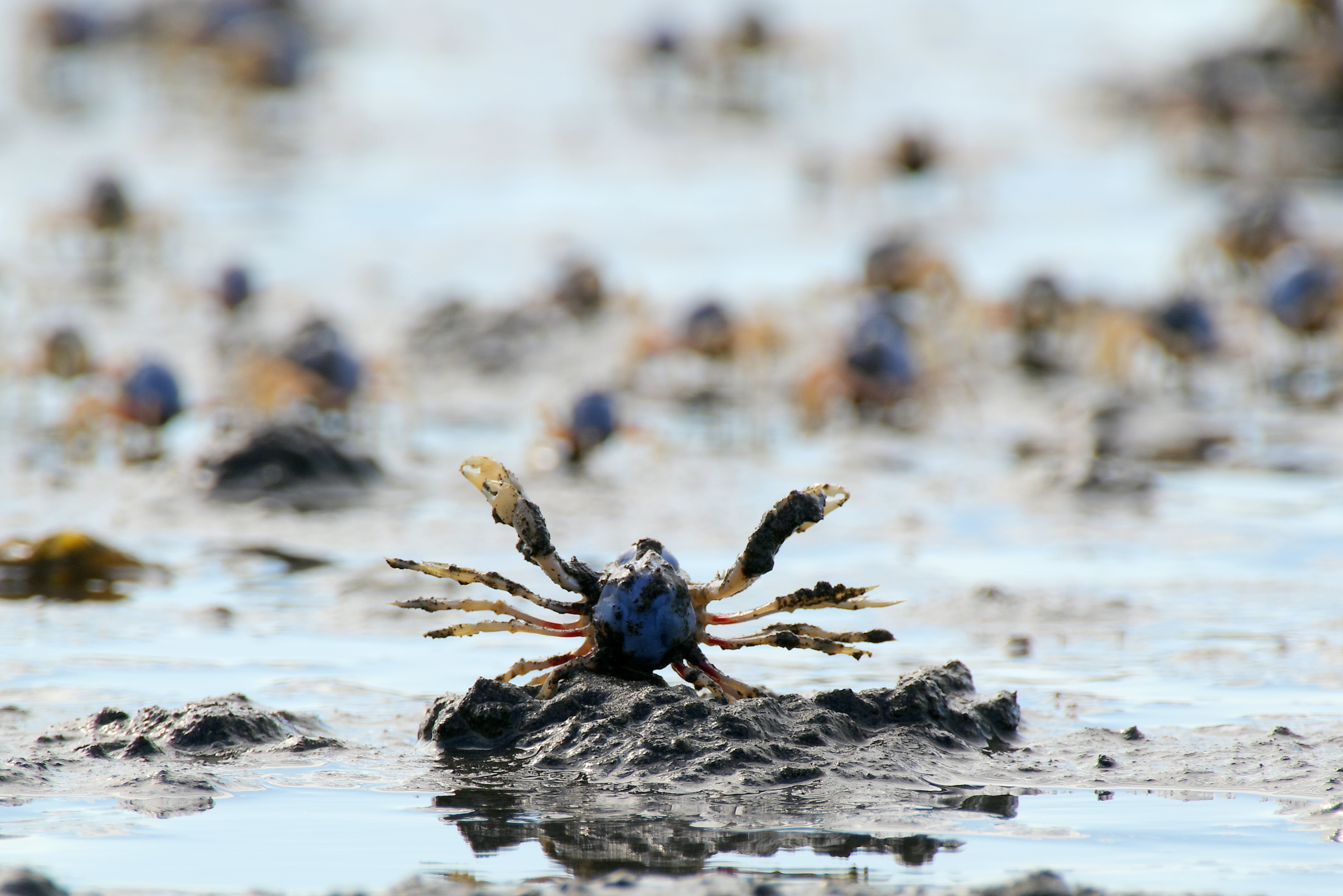

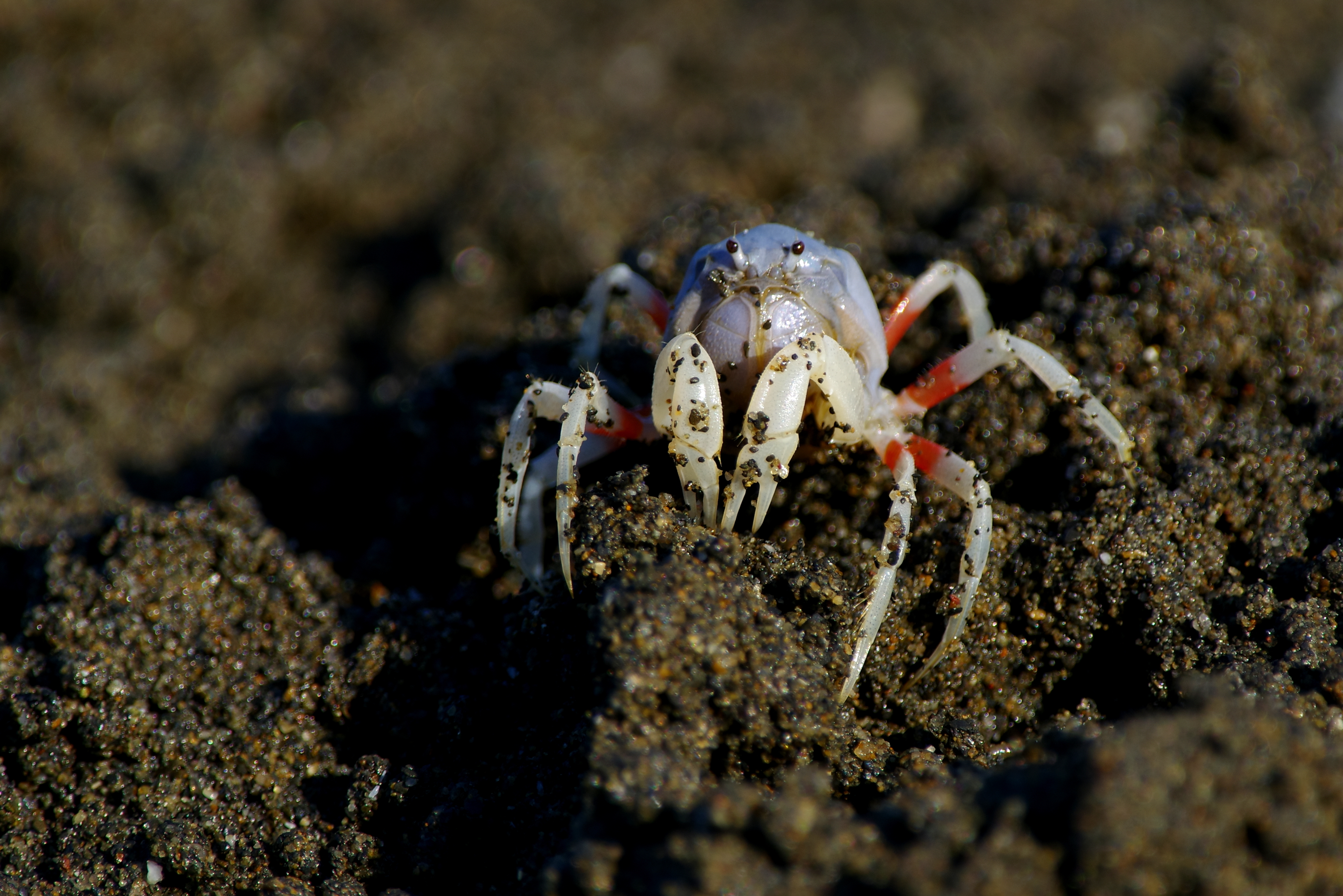

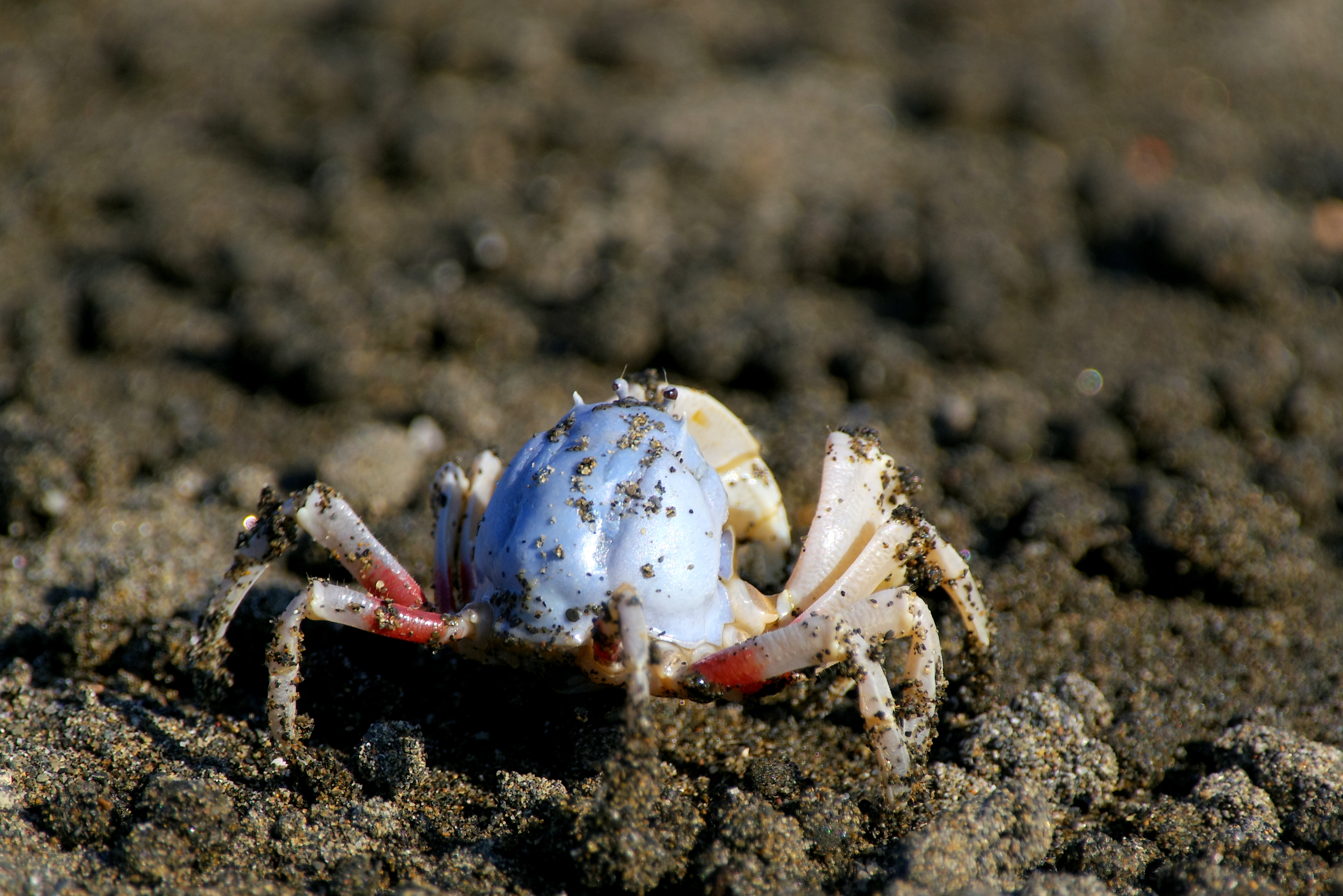
