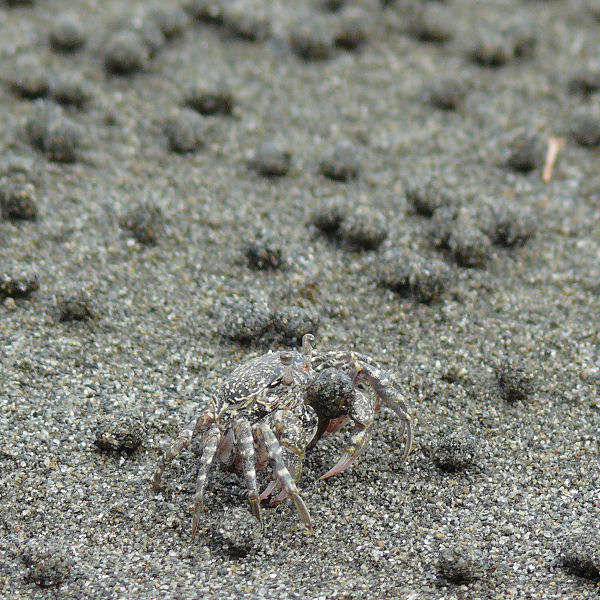
- Scopimera globosa, a sand bubbler crab

Scientific classification
- Kingdom: Animalia
- Phylum: Arthropoda
- Clade: Pancrustacea
- Class: Malacostraca
- Order: Decapoda
- Suborder: Pleocyemata
- Infraorder: Brachyura
- Section: Eubrachyura
- Subsection: Thoracotremata
- Superfamily: Ocypodoidea
- Family: Dotillidae; Stimpson, 1858

= Dotillidae =

Family of crabs

The Dotillidae are a family of crabs with 59 species, nearly half of which are in the genus Ilyoplax. The two genera Scopimera and Dotilla are collectively the sand bubbler crabs, which leave conspicuous collections of sand pellets on sandy beaches across the tropical and subtropical Indo-Pacific.

== Genera ==
Nine genera are currently recognised:

- Dotilla Stimpson, 1858
- Dotilloplax Tweedie, 1950
- Dotillopsis Kemp, 1919
- Ilyoplax Stimpson, 1858
- Potamocypoda Tweedie, 1938
- Pseudogelasimus Tweedie, 1937
- Scopimera De Haan, 1835
- Shenius Serène, 1971
- Tmethypocoelis Koelbel, 1897
