= Danièle Guinot =

French carcinologist (born 1933)

Danièle Guinot (born 1933) is a French biologist, an emeritus professor at the Muséum national d'histoire naturelle in France, known for her research on crabs.

== Biography ==
Guinot was born in eastern France and educated at the University of Montpellier and the University of Paris, finishing her studies in 1955. She then joined the Muséum national d'histoire naturelle as a research assistant; she remained there for the rest of her career. She earned a doctorate from Pierre and Marie Curie University in 1977.

== Research ==
Guinot carried out several studies of crabs from exotic environments, including deep-sea crabs from the Indo-West Pacific bathyal zone and from hydrothermal vents, and crabs living in caves in Papua New Guinea. Her doctoral thesis proposed a new classification system for certain crabs based on the position of their reproductive organs. In later studies, she became particularly interested in crab behavior, including stridulation, carrying, and camouflage. Over the course of her career she described 10 new families of crabs, 47 new genera, and 163 new species.

Guinot has also studied the history of crabs and of their interactions with humans, including crab fishing techniques, medicinal uses of crabs, and the study of Cretaceous fossil crabs.

== Awards and honors ==
In 2008, Guinot was the recipient of the Excellence in Research Award of the Crustacean Society.

More than 30 genera and species have been named in honor of Guinot. In 2010, a tribute volume of crustacean research papers was dedicated to her, and the Japanese soldier crab species Mictyris guinotae (newly distinguished from the previously identified species Mictyris brevidactylus) was named after her.
