= Moreton Island, Queensland =

Moreton Island Brisbane, Queensland
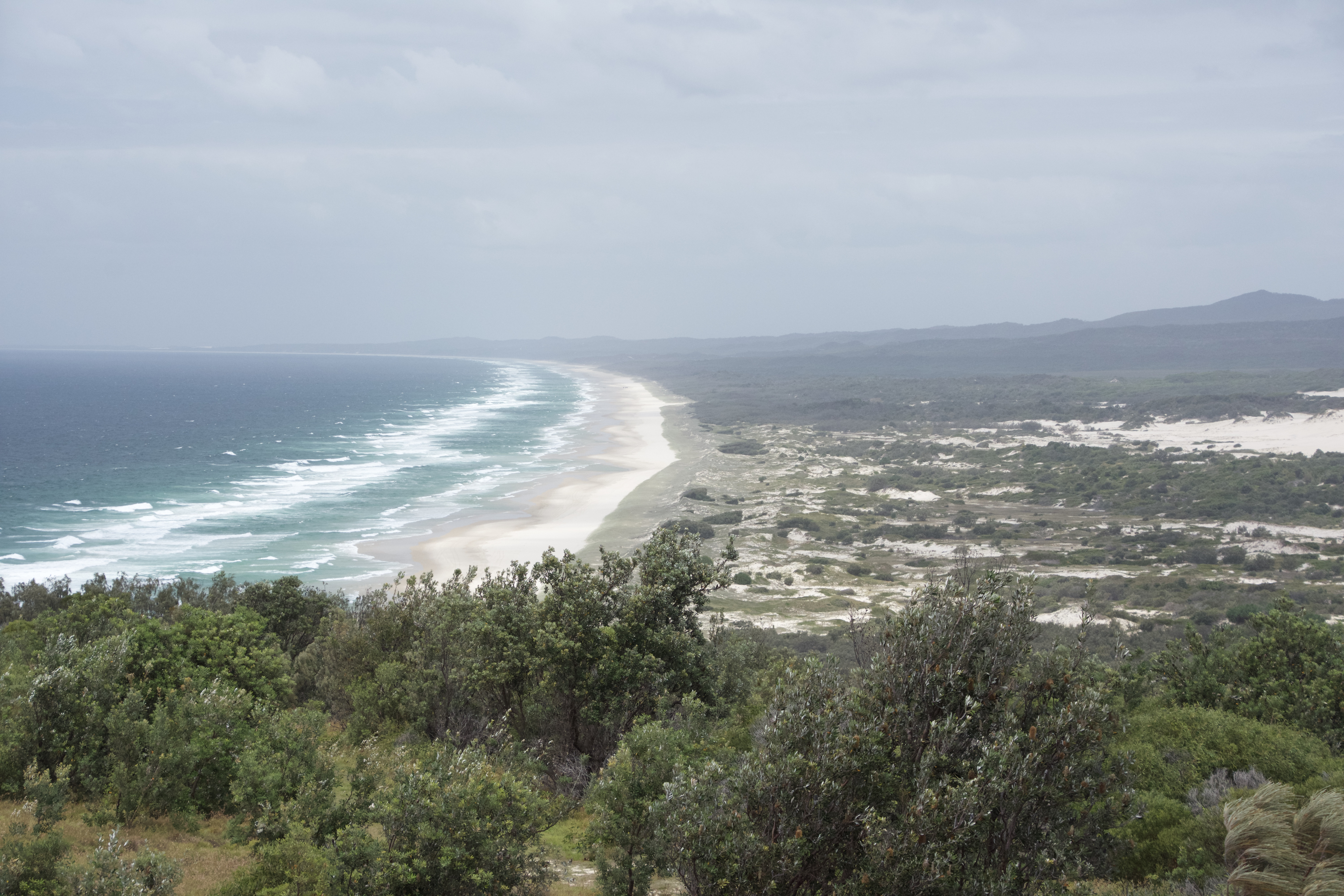
- Moreton Island, 2016

- Coordinates: 27.1686°S 153.4011°E
- Population: 180 (2021 census)
  - Density: 1.031/km^{2} (2.67/sq mi)
- Postcode(s): 4025
- Area: 174.6 km^{2} (67.4 sq mi)
- Time zone: AEST (UTC+10:00)
- LGA(s): City of Brisbane (Deagon Ward)
- State electorate(s): Redcliffe
- Federal division(s): Bonner
Suburbs around Moreton Island:
Bulwer	Moreton Bay	Coral Sea
Cowan Cowan	Moreton Island	Coral Sea
Kooringal	Moreton Bay	Coral Sea

Moreton Island is the largest locality on the island Moreton Island within the City of Brisbane, Queensland, Australia. In the 2021 census, Moreton Island had a population of 180 people.

== Geography ==
The boundary of the locality is that of Moreton Island as a whole with the exception of the three separate localities of Bulwer (on the north-west coast), Cowan Cowan (on the west coast) and Kooringal (on the south-west coast). Apart from the Tangalooma Resort, almost all of the locality is within the Moreton Island National Park.

Cape Moreton Lighthouse is on Cape Moreton, the north-eastern point of the island (27.0318°S 153.4659°E).

There are many named features and places on the island (from north to south):

- North Point, a headland (27.0222°S 153.4546°E)
- Rocky Hill, a mountain (27.0265°S 153.4556°E) 82 metres (269 ft)
- Cape Moreton, a headland (27.0279°S 153.4677°E)
- Tungewa, a place (27.0333°S 153.45°E)
- Yellow Patch, a place (27.0333°S 153.45°E)
- Cape Cliff, a headland (27.0390°S 153.4663°E)
- Five Hills, a mountain (27.0413°S 153.4143°E) 70 metres (230 ft)
- Comboyuro Point, a headland (27.0622°S 153.3638°E)
- Smith, a mountain (27.0621°S 153.4196°E) 112 metres (367 ft)
- Tabilbulla, a place (27.0666°S 153.3666°E)
- Diagram Hills, a mountain (27.0820°S 153.3894°E) 191 metres (627 ft)
- Bulwer Valley, a valley (27.0832°S 153.3826°E)
- Hutchison Peak, a mountain (27.0951°S 153.3935°E) 199 metres (653 ft)
- Jessie Peak, a mountain (27.1069°S 153.4157°E) 178 metres (584 ft)
- Mount Campbell, a mountain (27.1151°S 153.3846°E) 229 metres (751 ft)
- Russels Top, a mountain (27.1223°S 153.3883°E)
- The Nek, a place (27.1313°S 153.3950°E)
- Round Hill, a mountain (27.1341°S 153.3787°E) 182 metres (597 ft)
- Cowan Cowan Point, a headland (27.1354°S 153.3625°E)
- Chanuk Bair, a place (27.1375°S 153.3993°E)
- Hell Spit, a place (27.1410°S 153.3829°E)
- Storm Mountain, a mountain (27.1419°S 153.3953°E) 274 metres (899 ft)
- Mount Tempest, a mountain (27.1419°S 153.4036°E) 280 metres (920 ft)
- Pimple, a place (27.1450°S 153.4099°E)
- Flat Iron, a mountain (27.1462°S 153.3952°E) 246 metres (807 ft)
- Cone Hill, a mountain (27.1567°S 153.3881°E) 199 metres (653 ft)
- Tangalooma, also known as Turrbin, a resort (27.1817°S 153.3721°E)
- The Desert, a place (27.1926°S 153.3748°E).
- Tangalooma Point (27.1989°S 153.3654°E)
- Sandy Peak, a mountain (27.2472°S 153.4061°E) 122 metres (400 ft)
- Big Sandhills, a mountain (27.2765°S 153.4027°E) 80 metres (260 ft)
- Gebelum, a place (27.2740°S 153.3991°E)
- Kounungai, a place (27.2844°S 153.4031°E.
- Little Sandhills, a mountain (27.2989°S 153.4104°E) 45 metres (148 ft)
- Toulkerrie, a place (27.3166°S 153.4166°E)
- Umbounba, a place (27.3564°S 153.4210°E)
- Reeders Point, a headland (27.3604°S 153.4267°E)

== History ==
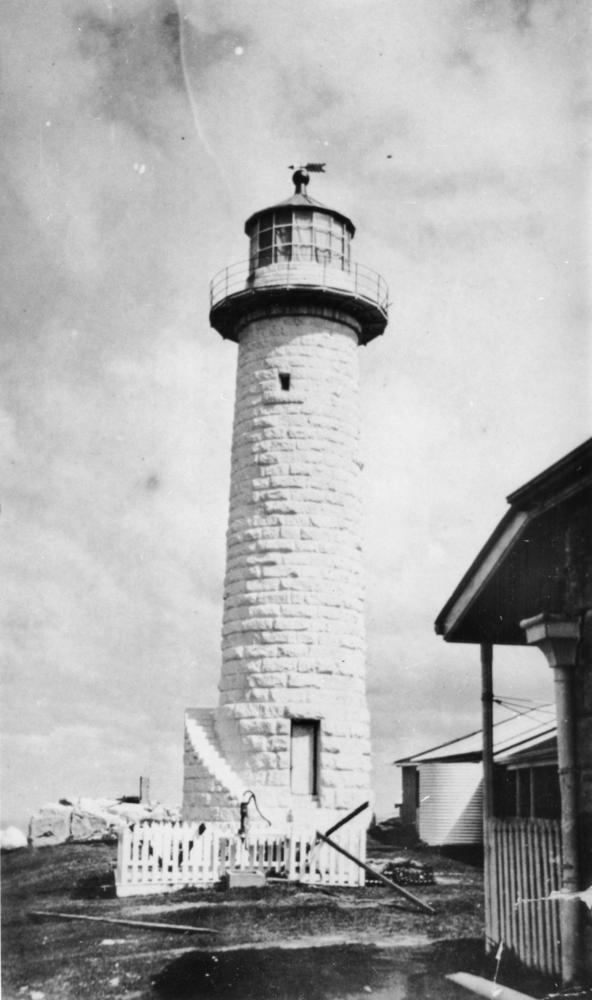
Cape Moreton lighthouse, 1910

The locality name of Moreton Island takes its name from the island of the same name, which was named by Lieutenant Matthew Flinders of HM Colonial Sloop Norfolk on 28 July 1799, taking its name from Moreton Bay. The bay was named by Lieutenant James Cook of HMS Endeavour in 1770 after James Douglas, 14th Earl of Morton, who was President of the Royal Society and was influential in obtaining the grant that enables Cook's voyage. The misspelling of the name Morton as Moreton occurred in the published records of the voyage.

With increasing amounts of shipping coming into Moreton Bay during the 1840s, the New South Wales Government decided to build a lighthouse on the north-east corner of the island (Cape Moreton). It was designed by architect Edmund Blacket in 1854 and completed in 1857. The Cape Moreton Lighthouse is the oldest lighthouse in Queensland and the only one built prior to the Separation of Queensland and the establishment of the Queensland Government in 1859. It is also the only lighthouse in Queensland built from stone. It is still operational.

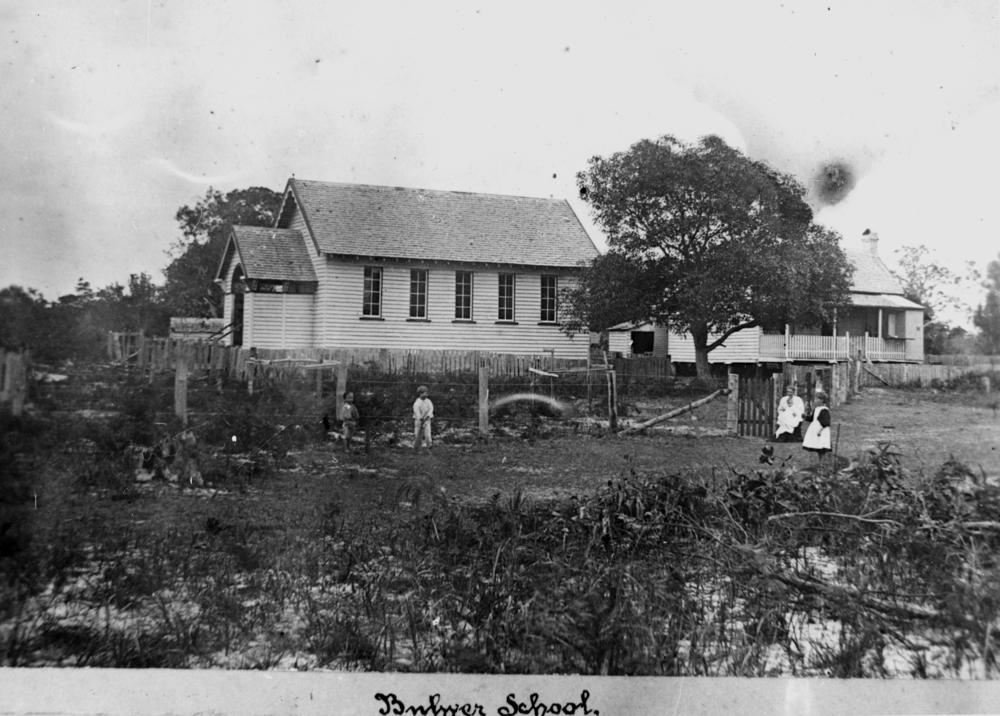
Cricket match at Bulwer State School, 1899, with the teacher's residence on the right

Moreton Island State School opened circa 1876, being renamed Bulwer State School in 1878. In 1891, it was downgraded to Bulwer Provisional School, but by 1895 was Bulwer State School again. When the pilot station families were relocated in 1909, the school was closed.

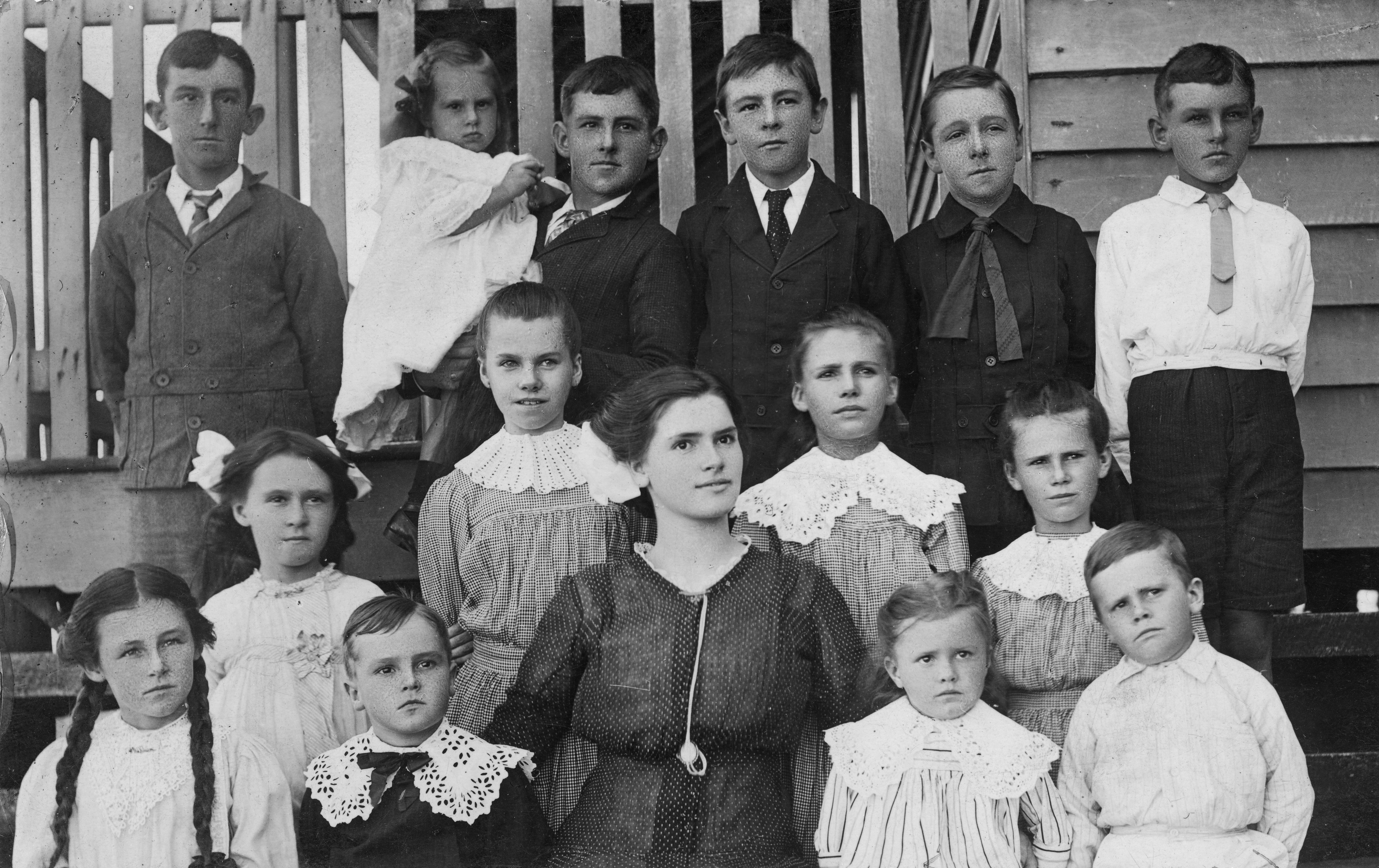
Students pictured with their teacher at Cape Moreton State School, circa 1913

Cape Moreton Provisional School opened on 28 August 1876 but closed in 1884. It reopened on 15 February 1886 and permanently closed in December 1925.

== Demographics ==
In the 2016 census, Moreton Island had a population of 243 people.

In the 2021 census, Moreton Island had a population of 180 people.

== Education ==
There are no schools on the island. The options are distance education and boarding schools.

== Transport ==
There are no road or rail bridges to the island. The island is accessed by boat (ferries and barges) or by air. Only 4WD verhicles are suitable for driving on the island.

There are a number of air transport facilities (from north to south)

- Tangalooma Airstrip (27.1372°S 153.3641°E).
- Kooringal Airstrip (27.3456°S 153.4258°E).
- Bulwer heliport (27.0724°S 153.3675°E).
- Kooringal Emergency Centre heliport (27.3491°S 153.4226°E)
- Cowan Cowan heliport (27.1310°S 153.3639°E).
- Tangalooma Resort heliport (27.1837°S 153.3708°E).
