= Fort Cowan Cowan =

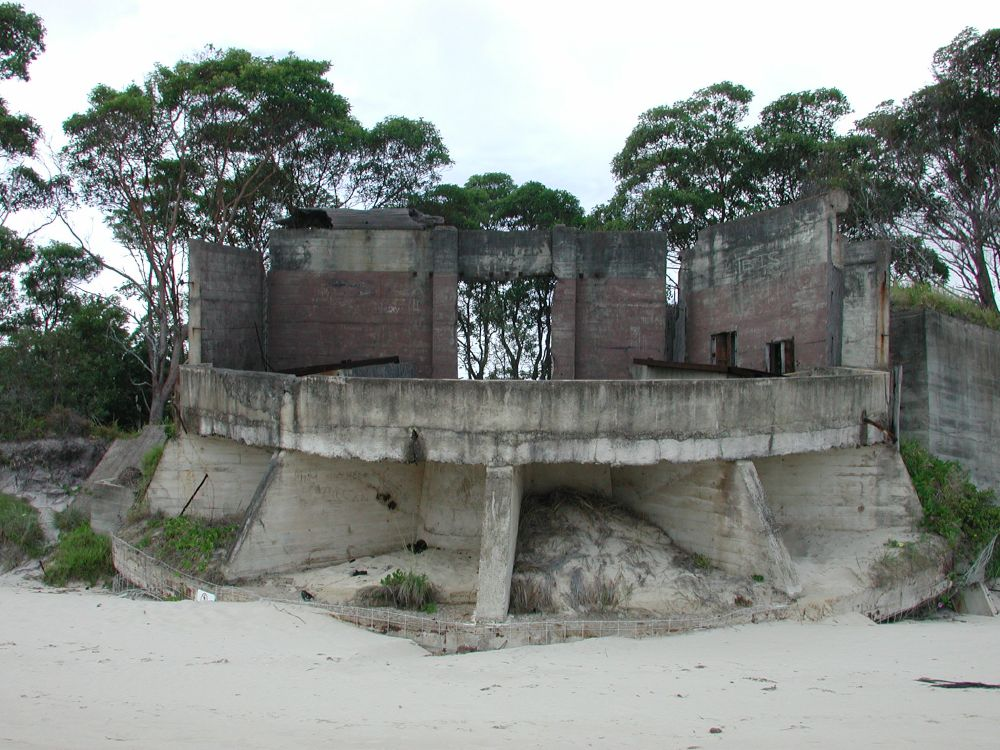
- Gun emplacement, Fort Cowan Cowan

- Location within Queensland
- 27.1255°S 153.3655°E
- Location: 30 Jessie Wadsworth Street, Cowan Cowan, Moreton Island, City of Brisbane, Queensland, Australia

Queensland Heritage Register
- Official name: Fort Cowan Cowan (Cowan Cowan Battery), RAN 3 Cowan Cowan, Fort Cowan
- Type: state heritage (archaeological, built)
- Designated: 1 October 2007
- Reference no.: 602559
- Significant period: 1939–45
- Significant components: magazine / explosives store, gun emplacement

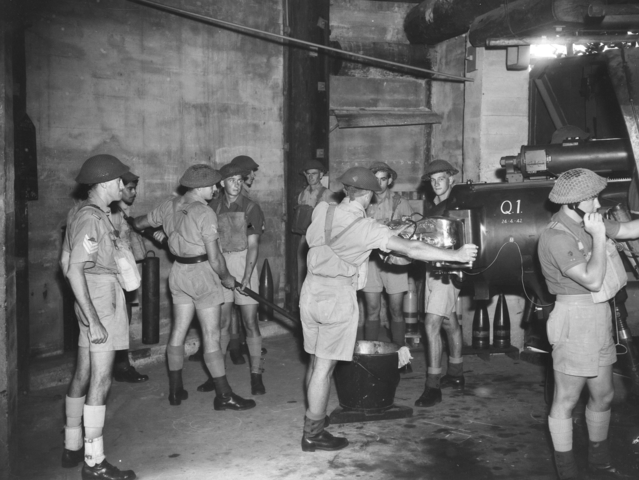
Gunners manning a 6-inch Mk XI gun, November 1943

Fort Cowan Cowan is a heritage-listed World War II fortification at 30 Jessie Wadsworth Street, Cowan Cowan, Moreton Island, City of Brisbane, Queensland, Australia. It is also known as RAN 3 Cowan Cowan, Fort Cowan and Cowan Cowan Battery. It was added to the Queensland Heritage Register on 1 October 2007.

The fort's main armament consisted of two BL 6 inch Mk XI naval guns.

== History ==
Fort Cowan Cowan is a World War II defence facility located on the western side of Moreton Island in Moreton Bay. The fort was commissioned by the Queensland Government in 1935 and constructed in 1937. It was operational until 1945 after which operations were scaled down and was eventually officially closed in 1960.

Fort Cowan Cowan was part of a network of artillery installations designed to defend Brisbane and Moreton Bay from attack by sea and which were in turn part of a larger scheme begun in 1935 to upgrade coastal defences. It was completed in 1937 and contributed to the coastal defence of Queensland until the end of the Second World War. Within the perimeter of Fort Cowan Cowan, which belonged to the Australian Army, the Royal Australian Navy (RAN) also had a presence with their RAN3 defence establishment.

Moreton Bay was named by Lieutenant James Cook after James Douglas, 14th Earl of Morton, the then president of the Royal Society in Britain who had been influential in raising a grant of £4,000 for the voyage of HMS Endeavour in its search for Terra Australis. Matthew Flinders then named Moreton Island in 1799 after the bay. European settlement on Moreton Island began in 1848 when the Queensland Department of Harbours and Marine built a pilot station near Bulwer on the north western side of the island to guide vessels through the passages of Moreton Bay. This was followed by the building of the Cape Moreton Lighthouse in 1857, at the northerly tip of the island and then the Comboyuro Lighthouse in 1877.

A telegraph office opened at Cape Moreton in August 1864, followed by a schoolroom in 1879. A telegraph line was constructed during the 1890s, to service the lighthouse. A Morse Lamp for signalling was installed at Cape Moreton c. 1910. The lamp is recorded as having a range of 20 miles (32 km) and as being in constant use for signalling purposes. Signal flags were used for daytime communication. A post office opened at Cape Moreton in 1915, and closed in the early 1920s with the lightkeepers serving as post masters during this period. Moreton Island was also the site of Queensland's only whaling station. In operation from 1952 to 1962, it closed after declining whale numbers made it unfeasible to continue. Today, Moreton Island has a small permanent population spread among three townships, Kooringal, Bulwer and Cowan Cowan and is primarily viewed as a holiday/recreational destination.

Prior to the 1860s, defence of the Australian colonies had been solely the responsibility of the British government. Britain considered that the Imperial Navy would always provide the first line of defence in any threat to her colonial empire, but from 1863 required the Australian colonies, by then self-governing, to contribute toward the costs of maintaining Imperial garrisons on colonial soil, and encouraged the colonies to provide for their own military infrastructure such as fortifications and barracks. Queensland, which had separated from New South Wales on June 6, 1859, could not afford to contribute to Imperial defence, and so Imperial troops were gradually withdrawn from the colony - the last leaving by 1870. In the 1860s Queensland established a number of volunteer defence units, based on the British model, but their effectiveness was severely impaired by a lack of armaments and ammunition.

By the 1870s the Australian colonies were developing rapidly and were concerned with potential threats from colonial powers such as Russia and France (the latter had annexed New Caledonia in 1873). In 1877 the colonial governments of New South Wales, Queensland, Victoria and South Australia, anxious to secure the land defence of their coastlines, jointly invited British Royal Engineers Colonel Sir William Francis Drummond Jervois and Lieutenant-Colonel Peter H Scratchley, to inspect existing defence installations and make recommendations as to how these might be improved. Scratchley's particular expertise was in the design and construction of deterrent coastal fortresses. Jervois and Scratchley identified maritime attacks as the greatest threat to Australia, and recommended that coastal defences be developed for all the mainland colonies. Despite being physically closer to the source of most threats, Queensland, with its sparse population and limited resources, was not considered to be greatly at risk. In his August 1877 preliminary report on Queensland coastal defences, Jervois identified the principal threat to Queensland security as an attack from the sea on the major ports (Brisbane, Rockhampton and Maryborough), in the form of city bombardment to secure supplies and coal, rather than for permanent occupation. This report was the first to seriously propose the defence of Moreton Bay although due to prohibitive costs the proposal was not supported at the time.

As events in Europe and Asia in the 1930s moved the world towards war, various sectors of Australia's defence, including coastal fortifications, were examined. There was an increased emphasis on defence rearmament from 1935. As major cities and ports along the coastline would be exposed to damage from naval raids or attack, coastal defences were to be upgraded. Batteries were established in Sydney, Darwin and along the Western Australia coast. Invasion was not a major concern at this stage, rather the batteries were for defence against seaborne shelling or the torpedoing of ports. The defence of the Moreton Bay region was concentrated on the mouth of the Brisbane River at Fort Lytton (now part of Fort Lytton National Park), constructed in 1880–1881, until the mid 1930s, when attempts were made to upgrade the region's defence.

Prior to the building of Fort Cowan Cowan, attitudes towards defence were changing. Military experts were supporting the implementation of more mobile defence forces, as opposed to fixed facilities. Technology was changing for both weaponry and shipping and as such, defensive techniques were constantly under review. The government's plan of building coastal defence forts for protection was a somewhat outdated 19th century response to a modern 20th century situation. Unlike previous wars in which sea-based attacks were prevalent, the war in the Pacific in the 1940s was far more about aerial warfare. Therefore, coastal defence forts were not necessarily the most appropriate or effective defence plan the government could have implemented.

The shipping channels in Moreton Bay simplified the proposed placement of batteries. The major access route into the Brisbane River was the northwest channel, which ran close to the shore near Caloundra, across the bay in a southeasterly direction towards Moreton Island, and then south westerly towards the mouth of the river, forming a Z-shaped route. This dictated the ideal positions for artillery batteries, with the most effective sites for guns being the closest points to the channel bends.

There were two naval establishments within the army site of Fort Cowan Cowan, consisting of a Port War Signal Station (PWSS), also referred to as the Naval Signal Station (which pre-dated the construction of Fort Cowan Cowan) and the naval station (RAN3). The naval station was responsible for the two controlled minefields, one in Pearl Channel (called M11) and one in the main channel off Cowan Cowan (M5).

Fort Cowan Cowan was built according to standard military plans that were modified to suit the sandy terrain. Construction of the fortifications commenced late 1936 and were completed by September 1937. Structures included the gun emplacements, command tower, observation post, engine rooms, pump house, jetty, well, mess rooms, washrooms, latrines, equipment stores and water services. The site included the installation of a reticulated water and sewerage system, which was unusual for the time considering the majority of the greater Brisbane area was not sewered until the 1960s.This seems to be related to a hygiene report on the site during construction of the fort which recommended the system for reasons of maintenance costs and adherence to modern sanitary practices.

Fort Cowan Cowan took over the role of an Examination Battery from Fort Lytton. The function of the Examination Service was to identify and ascertain the character and intentions of vessels seeking to enter defended ports. Merchant vessels approaching a port would be met by an Examination Vessel, stationed permanently at the Examination Anchorage near the entrance to the port. If an approaching vessel could not be identified, it was directed to proceed to the Examination Anchorage under the observation of the Examination Battery, and further investigation was undertaken. The major function of the Naval Signal Station appears to have been to receive signals from the Examination Vessels and relay messages to the gunnery, rather than to send signals which would have revealed the position of the battery.

The first real indication of enemy naval presence in proximity to Brisbane occurred on 24 March 1942 when a suspected Japanese submarine was sighted east of Stradbroke Island. Two 100-pound (45 kg) bombs were dropped on it but there has never been any evidence that the submarine was destroyed. On 4 June 1942 another Japanese submarine, identified as "I.29" was sighted off Moreton Island. This submarine was later identified as one of the vessels involved in the midget submarine attack on Sydney Harbour on 31 May 1942. On 14 May 1943, the hospital ship AHS Centaur was struck and sunk off the Brisbane coastline by the Japanese submarine, "I.177". Of the 332 people on board only 64 survived to be rescued by the American destroyer, USS Mugford. The last attack to occur in the approaches to the Port of Brisbane, took place on 4 June 1943 off Cape Moreton when the Japanese submarine "I.174" fired on the American ship MV Edward Chambers. The submarine withdrew when return fire was given. Although there was clearly hostile activity present in the waters off Brisbane, the only recorded combat firing that took place at Fort Cowan Cowan was on 4 March 1942 when the battery fired upon the trading vessel, SS Tambor, after it failed to give proper identification. This incident resulted in the loss of three crewmen's lives.

Fort Cowan Cowan was in operation until 1945 when instructions were issued for all coastal defences, except those in Darwin, Sydney and Fremantle, to be scaled down and kept in a state of care and maintenance. With the reassessment of Australia's defensive arrangements in the 1950s, the role of artillery batteries in coastal defence diminished. The government recognised that the nature of modern warfare had changed and fixed coastal defences were no longer considered a necessary part of defensive plans. At this time Brisbane was still a defended port but by 1960 this arrangement was redefined and Fort Cowan Cowan closed.

Although Moreton Island is primarily a tourist destination, it does have three small townships. Since closing, much of Fort Cowan Cowan has been removed, destroyed or has disappeared into the residential landscape of the Cowan township. In some cases, buildings from the complex have been converted for other uses such as holiday accommodation. Moreton Bay Boat Club (MBBC) has leased Lot 46 C9562 which comprises a number of interlinking concrete paths, the four magazine huts, the foundations of the kitchen and soldiers' mess, store hut and the concrete water tank. MBBC have converted the magazine huts and storage hut into accommodation blocks for use by club members. The two gun emplacements remain in situ on the beach although over the years the tide line has moved progressively closer to them. Their condition has deteriorated and both emplacements are listing dangerously on their foundations as the sand shifts from under them.

== Description ==
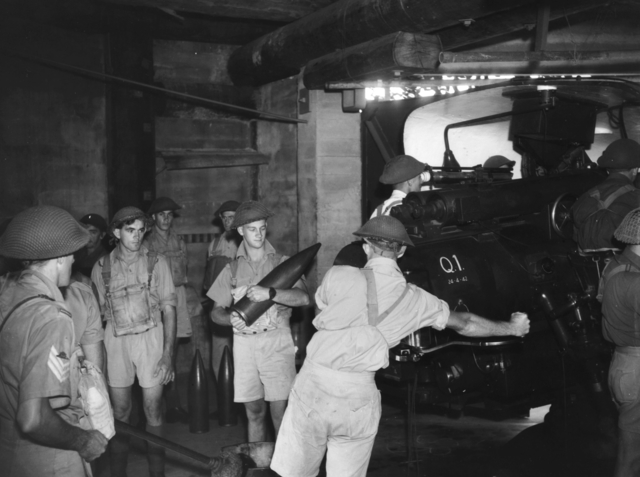
6 inch Mk XI gun and crew, Fort Cowan Cowan, November 1943

Fort Cowan Cowan is located at Cowan Cowan Village, Moreton Island. The area is approximately 34,616.033 metres (113,569.66 ft) square, roughly triangular in shape and stretches along the western beach from the Cowan Cowan Lighthouse in south to the northern end of Cowan Cowan Village. Jessie Wadsworth Street forms part of the eastern boundary.

The site comprises a number of structures, all built in 1937, including two gun emplacements, concrete paths, four magazine huts, foundations of kitchen and soldiers' mess, storage hut, engine room, underground sewerage and piping and a concrete tank.

The two gun emplacements are constructed from reinforced concrete and consist of an enclosed gun platform with metal blast doors and rooms beneath which are actually underground. The emplacements were originally situated behind the first dunes however as the beach has lost sand due to erosion the emplacements are now close to the tide line. Most of the walls have shifted and tilted as the erosion has undermined the gun platforms and the platforms on both emplacements have separated from the rear sections and tipped forwarded onto the beach. As erosion proceeds, the potential for ongoing collapse is high. In addition, structural timbers have become decayed, been destroyed by fires, or have been removed. The lack of structural support means that walls are not tied together and are in an advanced state of collapse.

The doors on Number 1 (northern) emplacement have been removed and placed flat on the platform however, the underground room, steps and metal doors are intact. In the case of Number 2 (southern) emplacement, the blast doors have swung open and are hanging downwards, should either the supporting wall or the door hinge fail, the door and/or attached wall will topple onto the beach. The gun platform has effectively disarticulated from the underground section. The top section of the wall supporting the southern blast door has snapped and fallen onto the foundations.

The concrete pathways lead from the gun emplacements to the magazine huts and between the huts. Although cracked, the paths are still largely intact and clearly visible.

The four magazine huts and storage hut have been converted into accommodation blocks but still retain a large degree of original appearance including the roof vents.

The concrete slab foundations of kitchen and soldiers' mess remain intact and visible.

There are visible remains of the engine room and concrete pipes from the reticulated water and sewerage system.

A concrete tank is still intact and visible.

== Heritage listing ==
Fort Cowan Cowan (also known as the Cowan Cowan Battery) was listed on the Queensland Heritage Register on 1 October 2007 having satisfied the following criteria.

The place is important in demonstrating the evolution or pattern of Queensland's history.

The Fort Cowan Cowan Second World War fortifications, constructed in 1937, are important in demonstrating the pattern of Queensland's history, being part of the preparations for the defence of Australia, in particular the Moreton Bay region, during the 1930s and the Second World War. It demonstrates the evolution of Queensland's coastal defences, which began in the 1880s with the construction of Fort Lytton at the mouth of the Brisbane River and included a signal station at Cowan Cowan prior to Fort Cowan Cowan's construction.

It is important for the intactness of the physical evidence of the Second World War defence scheme, and retains additions and alterations which illustrate the evolution of Queensland's defence planning and of military process and technology up to the 1940s. The place is significant as part of a co-ordinated system of coastal defence in Australia.

The place demonstrates rare, uncommon or endangered aspects of Queensland's cultural heritage.

Fort Cowan Cowan demonstrates uncommon surviving evidence of a largely intact and interpretative Second World War battery complex which incorporates a number of structures including two gun emplacements, concrete paths, four magazine huts, foundations of kitchen and soldiers' mess, storage hut, engine room, underground sewerage and piping and concrete tanks.

Fort Cowan Cowan provides rare surviving evidence of a Second War World coastal fortification in Queensland, and is important in demonstrating the principal characteristics of its type, with gun emplacements in situ.

The place has potential to yield information that will contribute to an understanding of Queensland's history.

Fort Cowan Cowan is representative of Second World War coastal defence batteries in Australia and is one of the first large-scale fortified installations to be constructed on a Queensland island. It has the potential to yield information that will contribute to the understanding of Queensland's history due to the extensive remnants of Second World War fortification sites, which includes both Army and Naval defences. It also has potential to yield information about the relationship between Fort Cowan Cowan and the other defence batteries in the Moreton Bay area that complete the coastal defence system.

The place is important in demonstrating the principal characteristics of a particular class of cultural places.

Fort Cowan Cowan is important in demonstrating the principal characteristics of Australia's Second World War coastal defence fortifications including 6-inch (150 mm) Mark X1 batteries modified to suit the terrain with emplacements being constructed of reinforced concrete with magazines to the rear of the gun platform rather than below.

The inclusion of a sewerage and pressurised water reticulation system, including plumbing and underground piping systems, at Fort Cowan Cowan was unusual for the late 1930s as the majority of the greater Brisbane area was not sewered until the 1960s.

The place is important because of its aesthetic significance.

Fort Cowan Cowan is important in exhibiting a range of aesthetic characteristics valued by the community including a sense of place, isolation, landmark quality of the gun emplacements, particularly when viewed from the sea; a sense of discovery; and the form, scale and materials of Fort Cowan Cowan and the Royal Australian Navy Station 3 fortifications.

The place has a special association with the life or work of a particular person, group or organisation of importance in Queensland's history.

Fort Cowan Cowan has a strong association with military activity in Queensland, as a site for defence, training and military support and with the Australian Military Force and Royal Australian Navy.
