= Kooringal =

Kooringal may refer to the following places in Australia:

- Kooringal, Queensland
- Kooringal, New South Wales
