= South Passage (Queensland) =

Strait in Queensland, Australia

Coordinates: 27°22′43.47″S 153°26′20.89″E

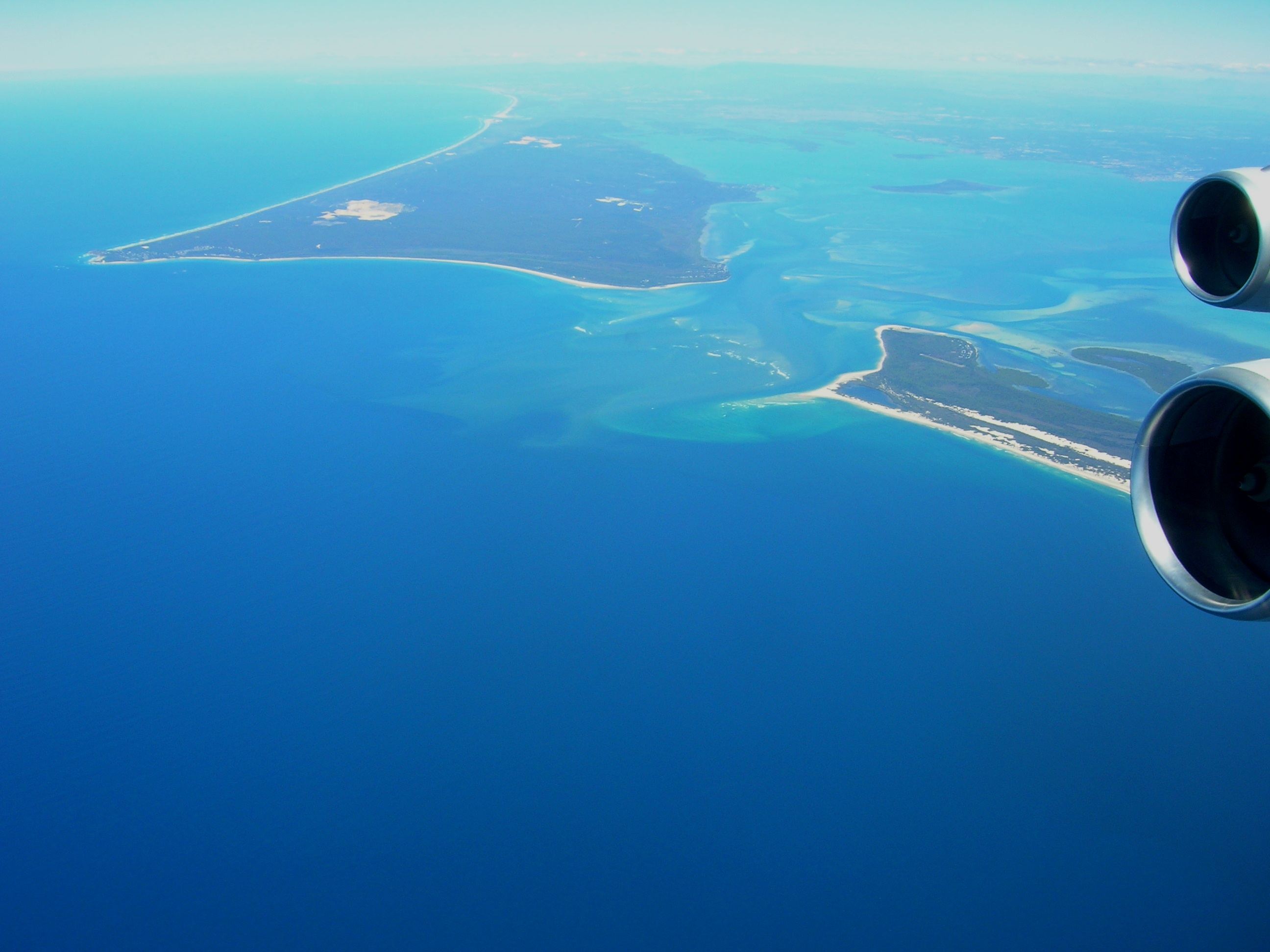
South Passage between North Stradbroke Island and Moreton Island (centre right of image)

South Passage is channel between the South Pacific Ocean and Moreton Bay. The other entrances to the bay are the North Passage or North Entrance and Jumpinpin Channel in the south.

It was once the main entrance for ships entering the bay. South Passage begins in the shallow sand-barred channel between Moreton Island and North Stradbroke Island and continues along North Stradbroke Island past Amity Point to Dunwich. The bay inside of South Passage consists of shallow water sandbanks.

Crossing the channel by small boat is not recommended, especially during a high swell, due to the network of channels and shifting sand bars. The tidal flow is rapid with a rate of 150 cm per second during the flooding tide and slightly slower during the ebb tide of 100 cm per second.

The passage has a return coefficient of 50%, meaning that half the amount of water that leaves the bay via the passage returns the same way on the flooding tide.

== History ==
The channel was not noticed by Lieutenant James Cook as he explored the coastline in May 1770. On 14 July 1799, Matthew Flinders was the first European to discern an opening between the islands. In 1824 John Oxley aboard the Amity left Moreton Bay via the South Passage after he had explored the Brisbane River with Allan Cunningham. He was the first European sailor known to do so.

The Lucinda was used as a mail vessel for delivering mail up and down the Queensland coast. The boat was largely captained by Captain James South who notably used South Passage to cut hours off the mail route. Some believed this is how South Passage came to be named, but it appears this is simply a coincidence. There is clear reference to South Passage prior to Captain South surveying/sounding and using this route.

On 11 March 1847, 44 people lost their lives when the SS Sovereign was wrecked as it passed through the passage; only 10 people were saved. This led to the shipping route being moved to the northern entrance to the bay the next year, while the pilot station was moved to Cowan Cowan on Moreton Island.

Another wreck found in the passage is the Rufus King.

== See also ==
- Gold Coast Seaway
