= Cape Moreton Light =

Lighthouse in Queensland, Australia

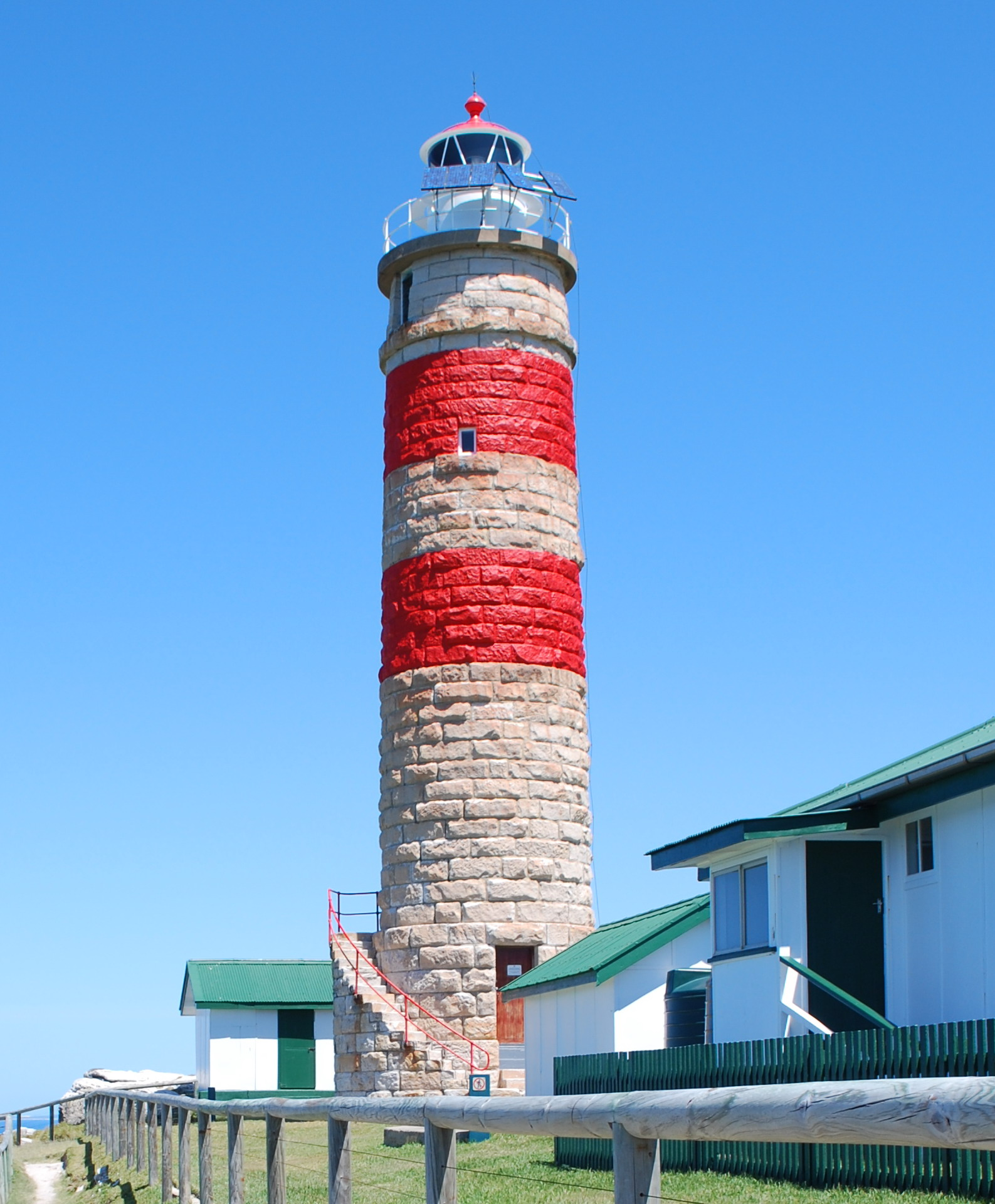
- Cape Moreton Lighthouse in 2011
- Location: Moreton Island, Queensland, Cape Moreton, Australia
- Coordinates: 27°01′55″S 153°27′58″E

Tower
- Constructed: 1857
- Designed by: Edmund Blacket
- Construction: sandstone (tower), cast iron (lantern), concrete (gallery)
- Height: 75 ft (23 m)
- Shape: truncated cone
- Markings: Unpainted (tower), red (dome), Stripe (2, red, horizontal direction)
- Power source: solar power
- Operator: Australian Maritime Safety Authority
- Heritage: listed on the Queensland Heritage Register

Light
- First lit: February 1857
- Focal height: 400 ft (120 m)
- Lens: VRB-25
- Intensity: 14,000 candela
- Range: 15 nmi (28 km; 17 mi)
- Characteristic: Fl(4) W 20s

Cape Moreton Light, also listed as North Point Range Rear Light, is a heritage-listed active lighthouse located on Cape Moreton, a rocky headland located at the north eastern tip of Moreton Island, a large sand island on the eastern side of Moreton Bay, on the coast of South East Queensland, Australia. It marks the northern entrance to Moreton Bay and Brisbane and also serves as the rear light for the North Point Range. With its two distinctive red bands, it also serves as a daymark. It is the oldest lighthouse in Queensland, and the only one to be built by the New South Wales Government before the separation of Queensland, which took place in 1859. It is also the only lighthouse in Queensland to be built of stone.

The lighthouse was established following an increase in traffic through the northern entrance to Moreton Bay in the 1840s. It was designed by Edmund Blacket in 1854 and established in 1857. Over the years the light source went through several changes, from oil wick, to kerosene, to acetylene gas, to electricity, and finally to solar power. The structures also went through various modifications, the major one being an increase in the lighthouse height and rebuilding of several structures, in 1928–1930.

The station includes the lighthouse, three lighthouse keeper residences, and various buildings. The lighthouse is made of sandstone and topped by a concrete gallery and a cast iron lantern. The residences and most other structures are timber framed and fibro clad.

== Establishment ==
In 1825, Brisbane was established as a penal settlement. In spite of the hazards, the preferred access to Moreton Bay and Brisbane was through the southern entrance, between Moreton Island and North Stradbroke Island, mainly due to shorter shipping route and better shipping conditions. The southern entrance was therefore marked in 1825 and a pilot station was established at Amity Point on North Stradbroke Island in 1827. Although the northern entrance was considered in the 1830s, it was only with the increased shipping activity due to the proclamation of Moreton Bay as a free settlement in 1842 that vessels began to use the northern entrance. Buoys marking the entrance were laid in 1846–1847, and in 1848 the Pilot Station was moved to Bulwer on Moreton Island. By then the northern entry was regarded as the main entry.

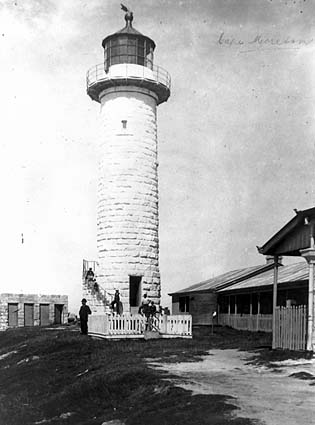
Lighthouse in 1917, note the original sandstone keeper cottage (replaced in 1928–1930) on the left and the lack of bands which were added in 1942

In 1850, Brisbane residents petitioned the New South Wales Government, which controlled the Queensland area until Queensland's separation in 1859, to establish a lighthouse on Cape Moreton. The government also wanted to encourage ships to use the broader and safer northern passage. Planning for the structure, therefore, commenced in 1852. The site was selected and surveyed in 1853, and the lighthouse was designed in 1854 by Edmund Blacket the New South Wales Colonial Architect of the time. However, Blacket resigned on 10 June 1854, for the private market, and left the office on 25 August. The office remained vacant until 1 October 1854, when Blacket was succeeded by William Weaver. Drawings for the tower which were completed in September 1854 were signed by Alexander Beazeley, Foreman of Works in the Colonial Architect's office. The tower was finally built during the office of Alexander Dawson who succeeded Weaver in 1856, and signed further drawings made in April 1856.

The tower was constructed by a contractor, Mark Farrell, for the cost of £15,232, using prison labor, and supervised by Beazeley. Both the lighthouse and three sandstone lighthouse keeper cottages were constructed from locally quarried sandstone. The lighthouse was first displayed in February 1857, though tenders for painting the tower were called for only in December 1858.

The original optical apparatus was a catoptric system consisting of 21 oil wick lamps with parabolic reflectors. The lighthouse was 67-foot-high (20 m), visible for 26.5 nautical miles (49.1 km; 30.5 mi).

=== Development ===
In 1859, control of the lightstation passed to the Government of Queensland, but it continued to be managed by the New South Wales Marine Board until the formation of the Queensland Department of Ports and Harbours in 1862. In 1864 a telegraph office was opened at the Cape. In 1873, the oil wick lamps were replaced with kerosene. During the 1860s and 1870s some further structures were constructed in the station including a schoolhouse (opened in 1879), a stable, and other storage buildings. A telegraph line was constructed during the 1890s, and a Morse lamp visible for 20 miles (32 km) was installed in the 1910s. In 1913 the timber parts of the structures, which were damaged by ants, were replaced. A 1911–1913 survey found the light in good shape, though the apparatus was found out of date and needing replacement. This replacement was to be delayed for a long time due to the transfer of all coastal lights to the Commonwealth, occurring officially October 1913, though practically in July 1915. A post office was operated by the light keepers between 1915 and the early 1920s.

In 1928, the tower was extended and the lighthouse reached its current height of 75 feet (23 m) to increase its range. In 1928–1930, the keepers' cottages were replaced with timber-framed fibro clad structures. In 1930, the lantern underwent major modification. The lantern house was replaced with 7 feet 1 inch (2.16 m) diameter Chance Brothers lantern room. The optical apparatus was replaced with either a third order Chance Bros dioptric lens or a four panel 375 millimetres (14.8 in) AGA catadioptric lens on an AGA pedestal. The light source was replaced by an AGA incandescent gas mantle operated by acetylene gas, and a sun valve was also installed.

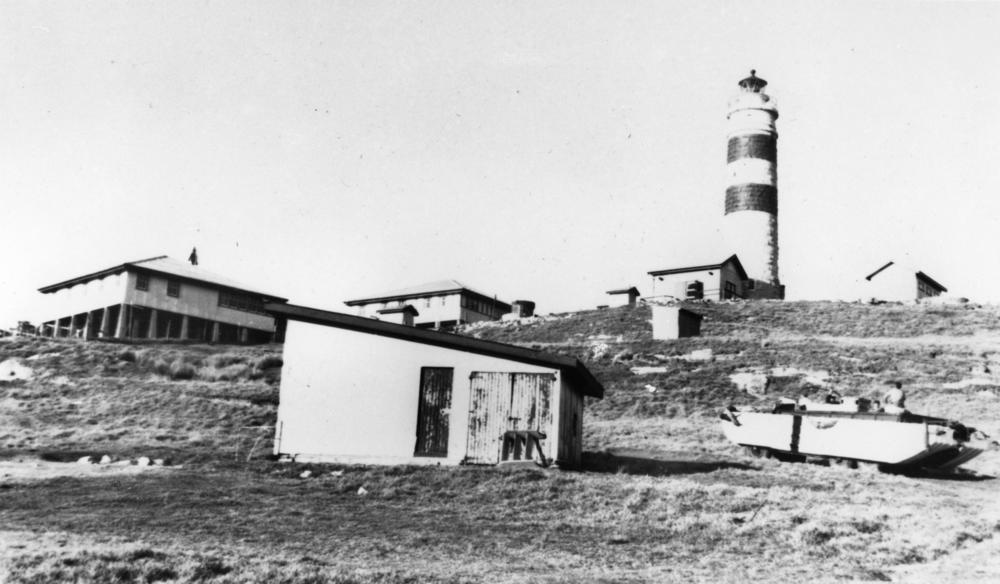
Lighthouse and surrounding buildings, 1951

=== Electricity ===
In 1937, the light was converted to 110 V DC electricity. The two distinctive red bands were painted in 1942. In 1967 the power source was replaced with 240 V AC power, being supplied by two diesel alternators, and a new lens, pedestal, bearing and optic drive may have been installed. The range of the 1967 light was 27 nautical miles (50 km; 31 mi). The light was modernised in July 1988, with the installation of a 120 V 1 Kw tungsten halogen lamp. In 1990, the handrails and stanchions of the balcony and external staircase were replaced and an access ladder to the dome was installed. On 8 December 1993, the light was converted to solar powered operation and a VRB-25 apparatus was installed.

== Current display ==
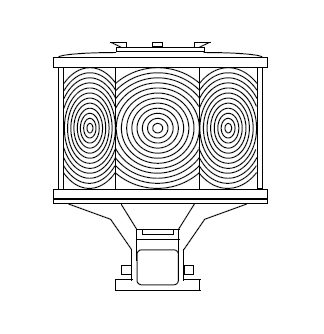
Side view of a VRB-25 lantern

The light characteristic shown is four white flashes, separated by 3.3 seconds, every 20 seconds (Fl.(4)W. 20s), visible for 15 nautical miles (28 km; 17 mi). The light source is a 12 V 35 W Halogen lamp producing an intensity of 14,000 cd. The light revolves three times per minute.

=== Front light ===
Cape Moreton Light is located 0.86 nautical miles (1.59 km; 0.99 mi) at 132°30′ from North Point Range Front Light. The front light is a square 22-foot-high (6.7 m) concrete house with a white lantern. It displays a quickly flashing white or red light, depending on the direction (Q.W.R.). The white light, shown at 04°-192° and 244°-258°, is visible for 9 nautical miles (17 km; 10 mi). The red light, shown at 192°-244° and 258°-294°, is visible for 8 nautical miles (15 km; 9.2 mi).

== Structures ==
The structures of the station are built in three levels. On the highest level is the lighthouse, surrounded by the workshop, former powerhouse and fuel store, the head keeper cottage to the north and an office further north. On the second level is the first assistant keeper residence and two sheds, a garage and a powerhouse. On the bottom level is the second assistant keeper residence, some distance to the south, and a fuel store to the north.

=== Lighthouse ===
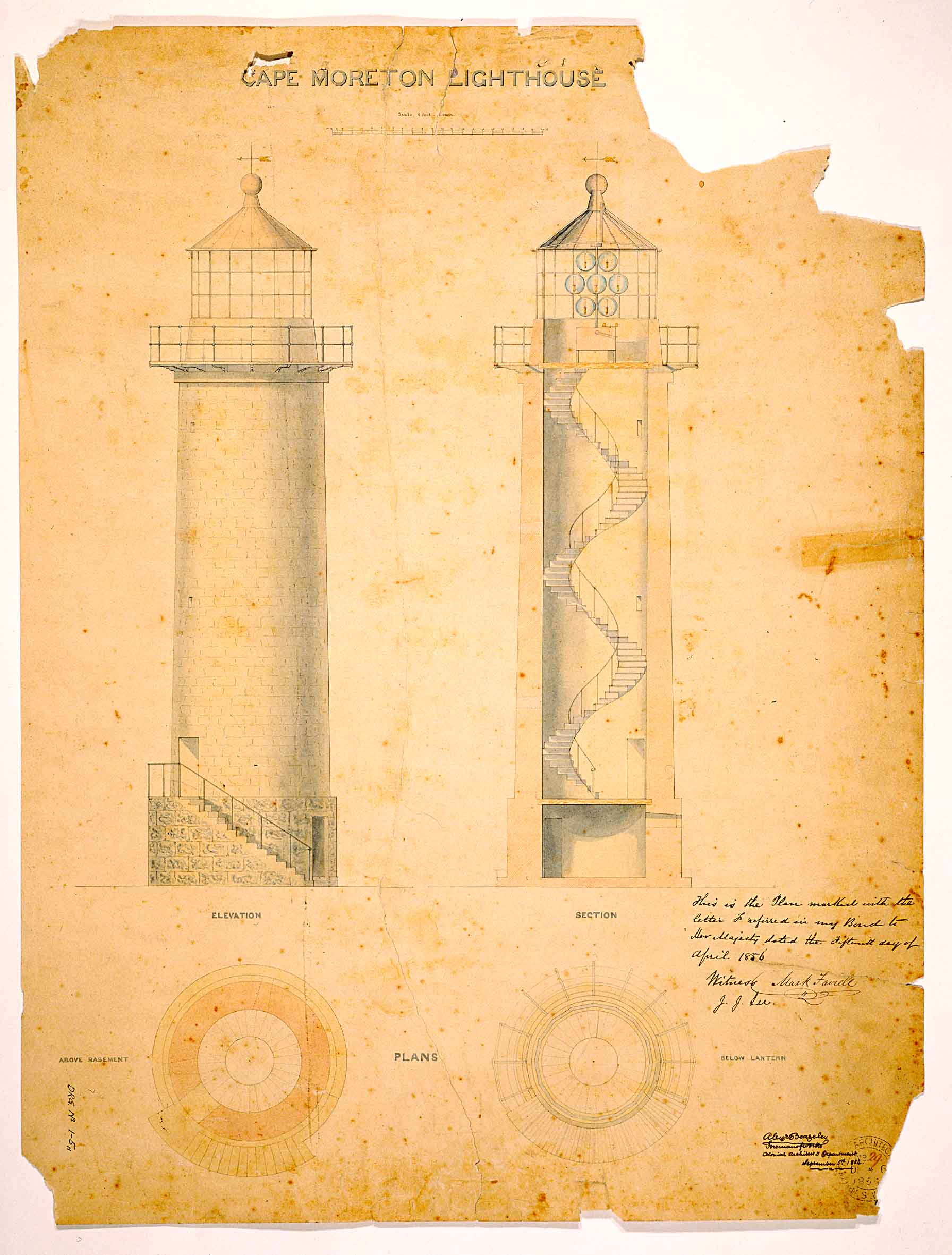
The 1854 drawings of the lighthouse

The circular tower, 18.5 metres (61 ft) high from the ground to the lantern, is made of sandstone blocks laid in regular courses. The ground level has thicker walls, topped by a timber floor. The tower shaft tapers slightly toward the top, where the cast iron lantern sits. Entrance to the tower is either through a timber door on the ground level, or through a timber door on the top of the original 1857 external masonry staircase (with a modern 1990 handrail) that circles the first floor, leading to the first floor. Two horizontal bands are painted close to the top, and the tower is otherwise unpainted, showing the sandstone colour. Both the ground floor and the lantern floor are made of concrete. Access from the ground floor to the lantern is first via a ladder leading to a trapdoor in the first floor, then via the original internal cast iron spiral stair, ending in a landing below the lantern, and finally, another short ladder leading to a trapdoor in the lantern floor. The internal is painted, and lit by small square glass panels in timber frames.

The tower is topped by the 1930 7 feet 1 inch (2.16 m) diameter Chance Brothers lantern, painted white. The lantern cylindrical wall is made of six bolted cast iron panels. These support a continuous band of curved glass with cast iron glazing bars, and a small catwalk between the wall and the glazing. The cupola on top of the lantern is made of sheet copper, painted red, and it is topped by ball vent and a wind vane. An access ladder and safety rails, installed in 1990, provide access to the cupola. In the center of the lantern is the VRB-25 apparatus, mounted on steel box.

Surrounding the lantern is a concrete gallery, accessible through a door in the lantern wall, with a white painted balustrade, and a 1990 railing. The solar panels are mounted on the gallery.

=== Other structures ===
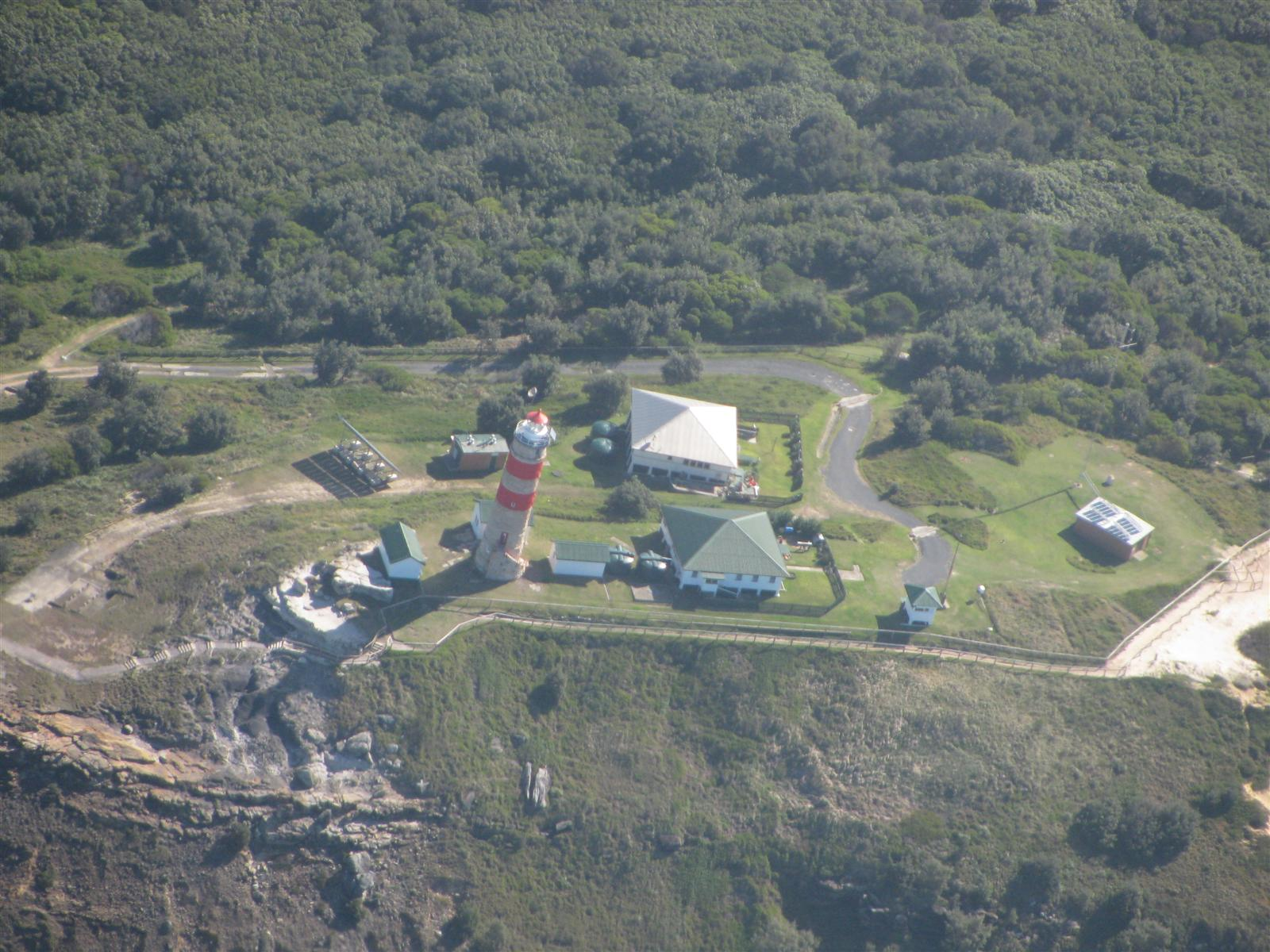
Aerial view of the station showing all structures except the second assistant residence which is to the south (left)

The three keepers' cottages were constructed in 1928–1930. The head keeper's house is located close to the lighthouse, and on the tallest ground, and also includes a small fenced garden. The assistant keeper residence is located right to the west, but geographically lower. The second assistant residence is located at some distance from the main cluster of buildings, to the south, and even lower. The residences are square one storey structures, timber-framed and fibro clad, with central rooms, no corridors, enclosed verandahs and hipped roofs. The head keeper's house and the second assistant's house have corrugated fibrous cement roof while the first assistant house has a newer corrugated zinc/aluminium alloy (Zincalume) metal roof. A museum was set in the second assistant's quarters in 1988. Two spherical steel rainwater tanks are set next to each of the houses.

The three sheds surrounding the lighthouse are the workshop to the south, the former powerhouse to the west and the fuel store to the north. They are all rectangular structures, timber-framed and fibro clad with corrugated fibrous cement gable roofs. The workshop appears to be built on the remains of one of the early stone buildings, lying on a plinth with sandstone steps. It consists of two rooms with pivoting sash windows and timber framed doors and no internal lining. The former powerhouse and the fuel store have reinforced concrete floors, fibro lining, double-hung sash windows and double timber framed doors.

The office to the north of the head keeper house is a small square room raised on short concrete pillars, constructed of timber-framed fibro clad walls and corrugated fibrous cement roof. It has a continuous band of windows. The last three buildings, the garage, powerhouse and fuel store, are small brick buildings with metal roofs and reinforced concrete floors.

== Site operation and visiting ==
The site and the light are operated by the Australian Maritime Safety Authority. The island can be reached by ferry service from Scarborough, though visiting requires a permit and a four-wheel drive is mandatory. The station is accessible, but the lighthouse is closed to the public.

== Heritage listing ==
The lighthouse was added to the Queensland Heritage Register in 2004.

== See also ==
- Moreton Island lighthouses
- List of lighthouses in Australia
