= Tangalooma, Queensland =

Australian seaside resort

Coordinates: 27°10′36″S 153°22′33″E

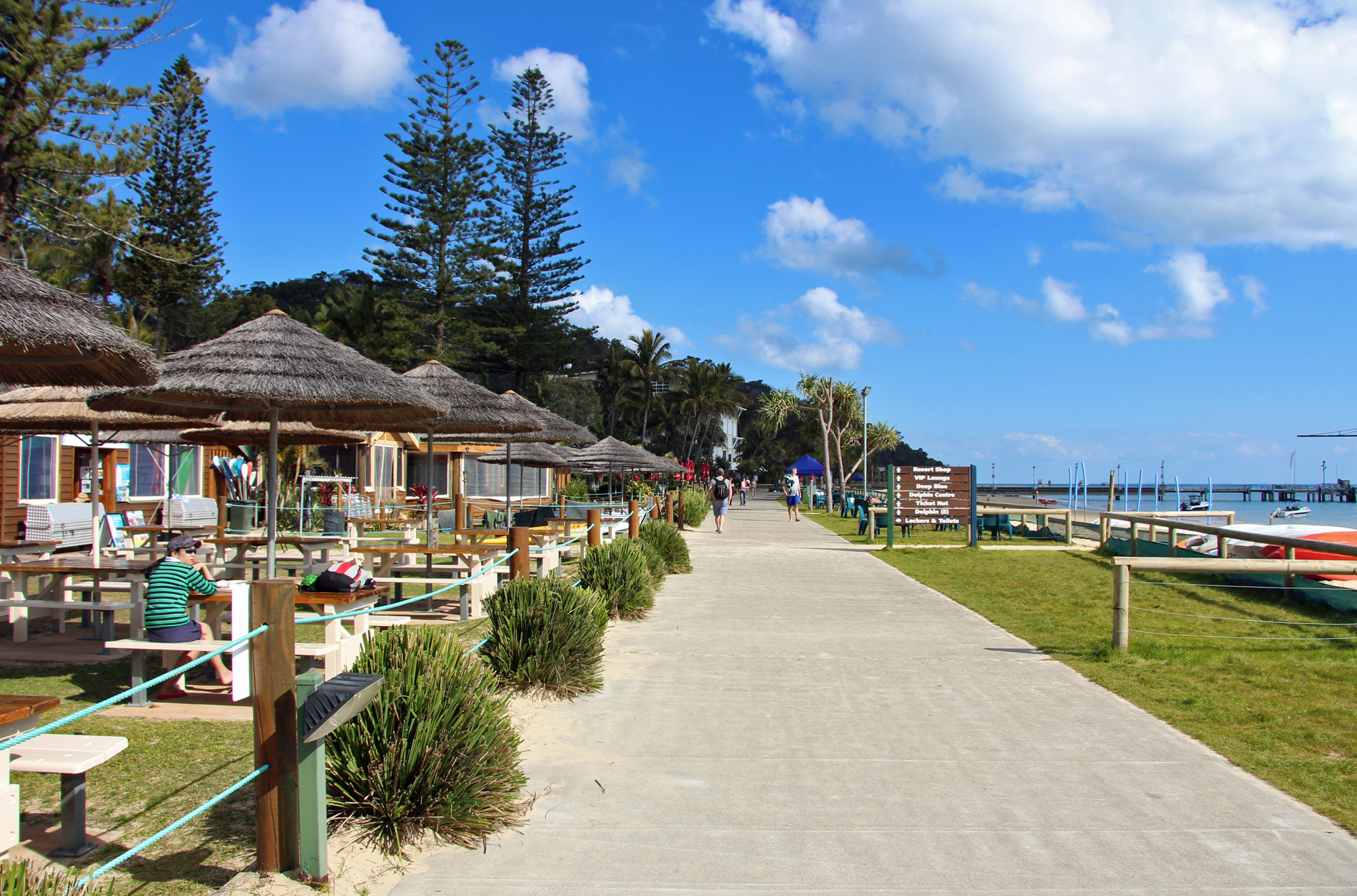
Tangalooma Island Resort on Moreton Island, Queensland

Originally a whaling station, Tangalooma Island Resort (formerly known as Tangalooma Wild Dolphin Resort) is a resort on the west side of Moreton Island in Queensland, Australia. It lies on the eastern shore of Moreton Bay and is known for its resort accommodation, dolphin-feeding program, sand dunes and wreck diving. Swimming is popular along the white beaches. It has a population of over 300 and receives more than 3,500 visitors every week as it is about 70 minutes from Brisbane by express catamaran. Moreton Island National Park covers 98% of the island, though there are three small townships including Bulwer, Kooringal and Cowan Cowan. The adjacent waters are protected as the Moreton Bay Marine Park. Tangalooma is an aboriginal word meaning "where the fish gather".

== History ==
During WWII a naval base and jetty were built at Tangalooma.

=== Whaling station ===
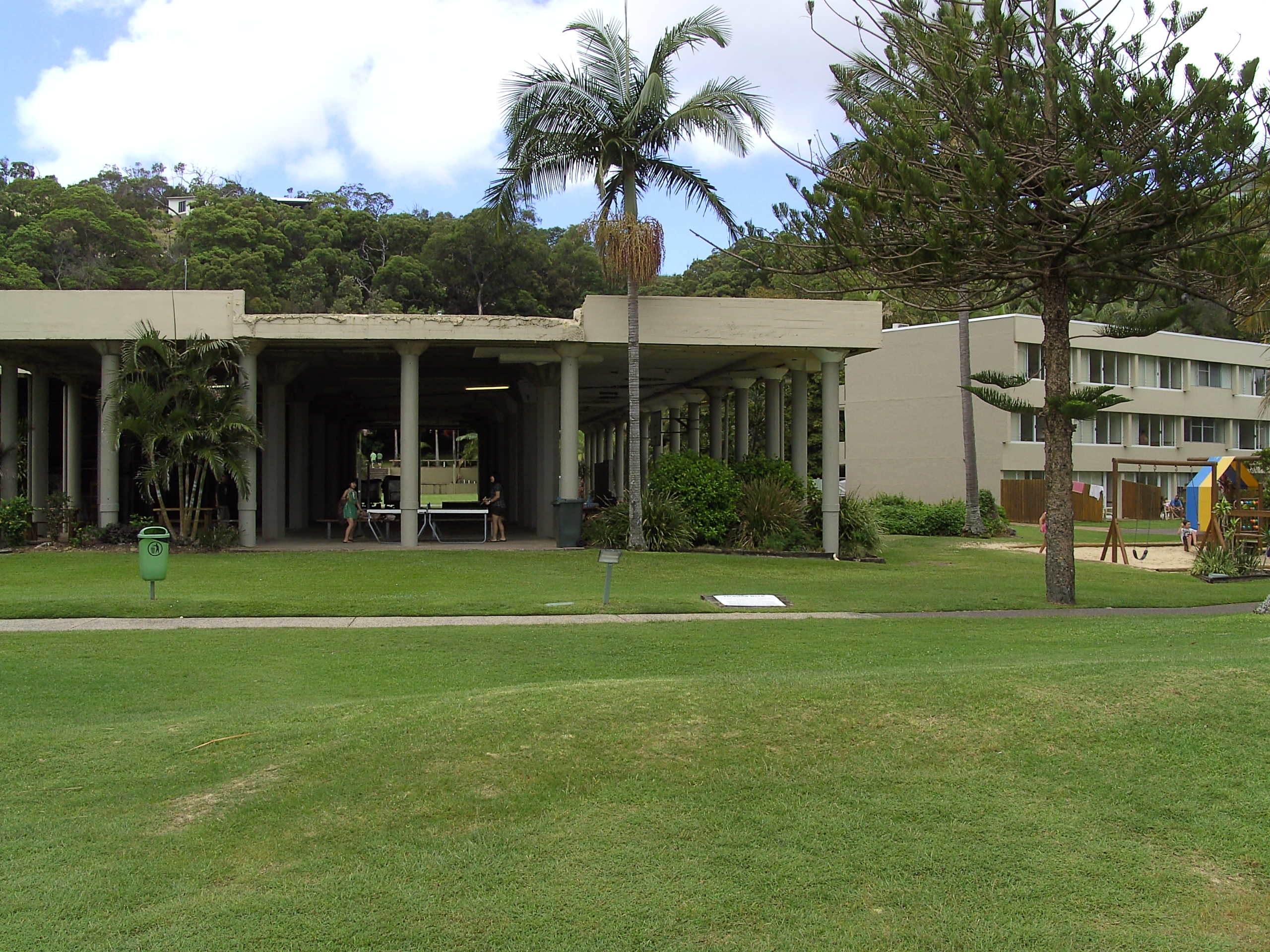
Flensing deck of whaling station (1952-1962) and modern accommodation.

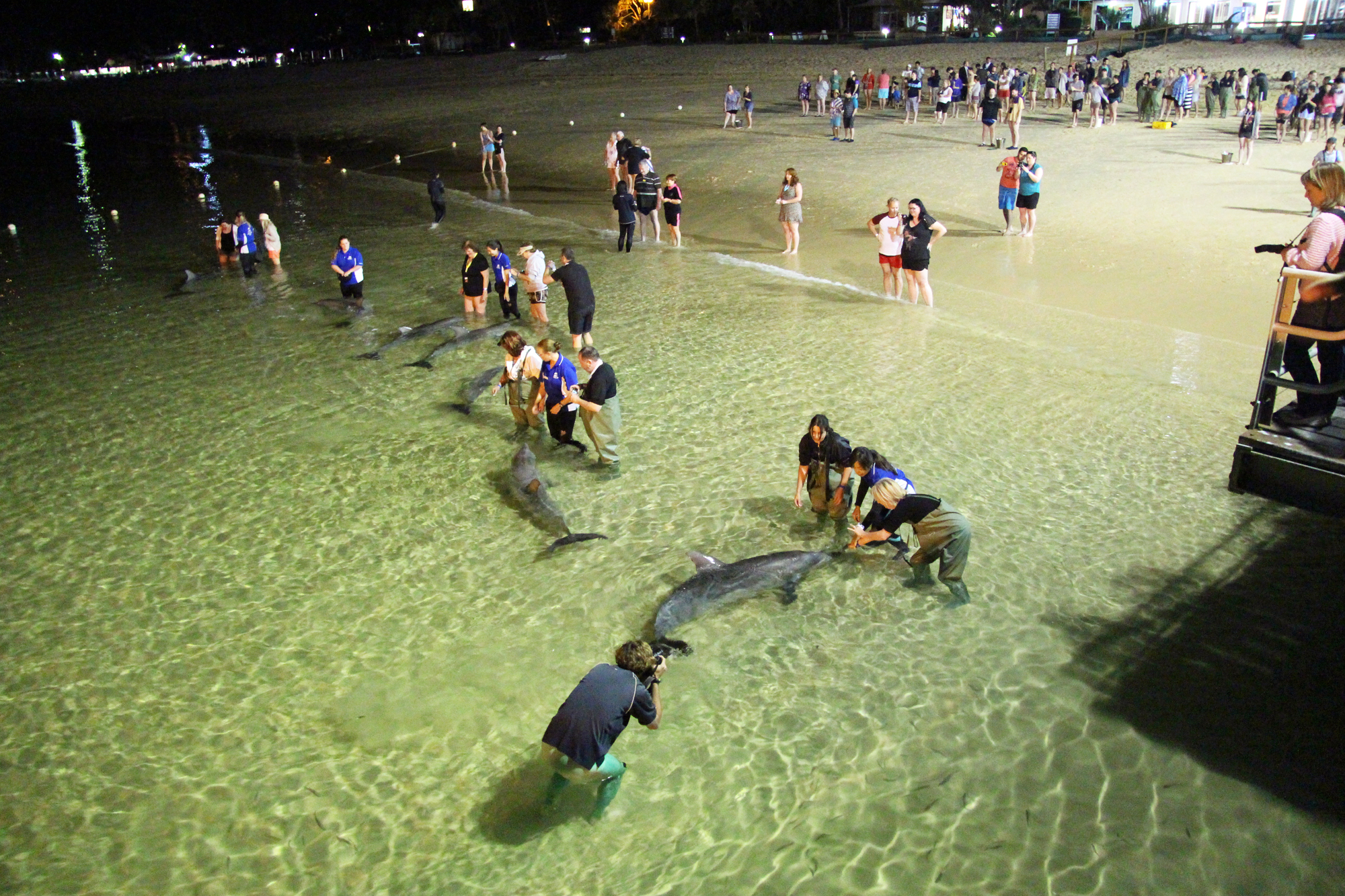
Feeding wild dolphins at Tangalooma Island Resort on Moreton Island

Tangalooma whaling station operated from 1952 until 1962, during which period it harvested and processed 6,277 humpback whales. Whaling took place when the humpback whales migrated along the coast in winter, in an eight- to ten-week season during which the processing factory ran 24 hours a day. The operation was at first very successful, employing a crew of about 140 people, but, in its final years, a collapse in catch levels made it uneconomic to continue. When the station began whaling, the population of eastern Australian humpbacks was estimated at 10,000; when it ended, the number of whales had been reduced to an estimated 500. In 1963 the hunting of humpbacks was banned in Australian waters; since then the population has been recovering. Following the closure of the station, it was sold for resort development.

== Tangalooma Eco Centre ==
Formally known as the Tangalooma Marine Education and Conservation Centre, the Eco Centre promotes environmental awareness. Eco Rangers conduct education programs and nature-based tours to enhance visitors' awareness of the surrounding ecosystems. The Eco Centre is based opposite the beach near the Tangalooma Jetty, where they operate the night wild dolphin feeding program for official guests of the resort.

== Tangalooma Island Resort ==
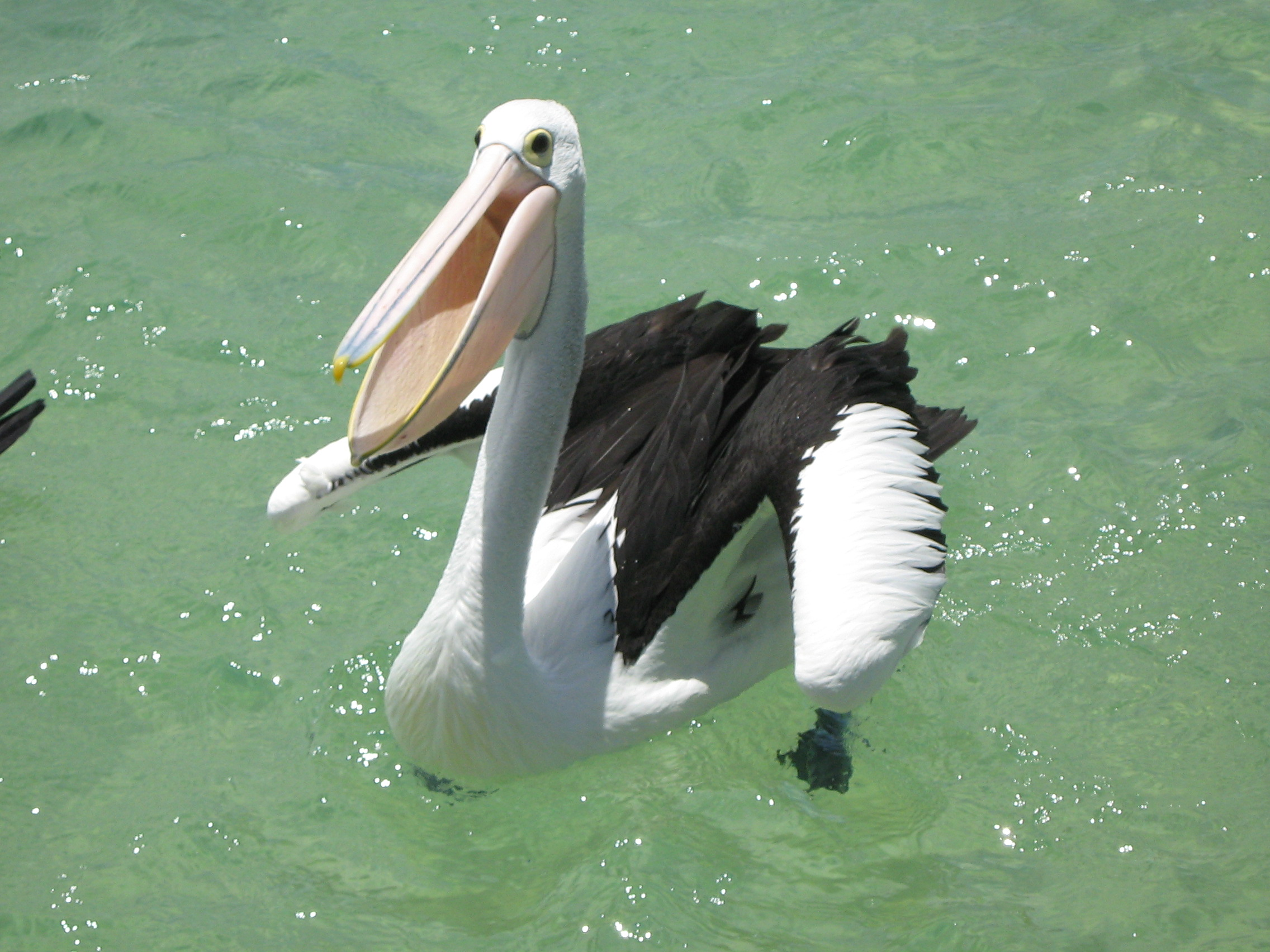
Australian pelican at feeding time

The resort (formerly known as Tangalooma Wild Dolphin Resort) is well known for the hand-feeding of wild dolphins. Every evening at sunset a pod of up to 11, local bottlenose dolphins swim to the beach in front of the resort where selected guests can feed them, an activity supervised by the Tangalooma Marine Education and Conservation Centre (TMECC).

Apart from the dolphin feeding program, there are many tours and other activities on offer, including whale watching cruises. Accommodation consists of about 300 rooms, as a variety of hotel units, villas and apartments. Sites for private housing are available on the sand hills behind the resort.

As at April 2018, although the resort has rights to use the beach in front of the resort, it can not prevent the public from also using the beach.

== Tangalooma ship wrecks ==
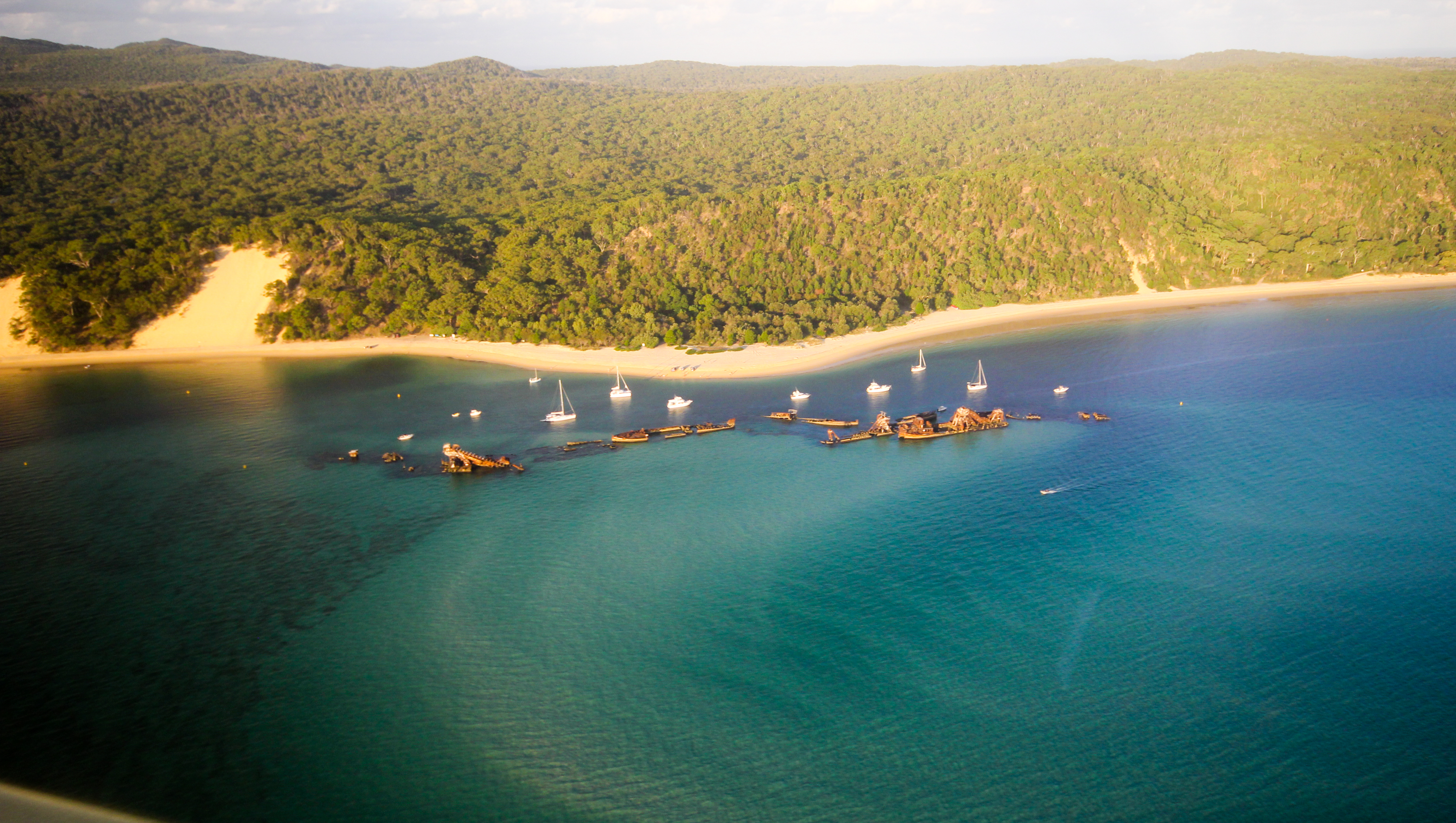
Aerial view of the wrecks.

Located to the north of Tangalooma Island Resort is a total of 15 vessels that were deliberately scuttled between the 1960s through to the 1980s. These wrecks have now become a man-made ecosystem providing a haven for local marine life including dolphins, sea turtles, wobbegongs and over 200 species of fish. The Tangalooma Wrecks are popular with boats as they provide a calm place to anchor and are known as a great snorkeling location.

HMAS Bermagui and HMAS Uki were two of the ships scuttled off Tangalooma.

== In popular culture ==
The series "Holiday Island" that aired initially in the early Eighties from channel Ten Melbourne, had many scenes filmed here on Moreton Island Queensland. The film Scooby Doo (2002) starring Matthew Lillard, Linda Cardellini, Freddie Prinze Jr. & Sarah Michelle Gellar was filmed here with Tangalooma referred to as 'Spooky Island' in the film. The film Ticket to Paradise (2022) starring George Clooney & Julia Roberts also filmed multiple scenes at Tangalooma Island Resort.

== See also ==
- Tourism in Brisbane
- Whaling in Australia
