= MV Pacific Mariner =

History
- Name: Pacific Mariner; Pacific Adventurer; Pacific Challenger; Changsa
- Owner: Swire Shipping
- Operator: The China Navigation Co. Ltd.
- Port of registry: Hong Kong, China
- Builder: Minami Nippon Shipbuilding; Usuki, Japan
- Completed: 1991
- Identification: Call sign: VRWS3; IMO number: 9003847; MMSI number: 477822000

General characteristics
- Tonnage: 18,391 GT; 9,229 NT; 25,561 DWT
- Length: 185 m (607 ft)
- Beam: 27 m (89 ft)
- Draught: 10.588 m (34.74 ft)
- Depth: 14.7 m (48 ft)

MV Pacific Mariner, formerly MV Pacific Adventurer, is a 1123 TEU geared multi-purpose container ship that gained notoriety after causing Queensland's largest oil spill on the east coast of Australia in March 2009. The ship is owned by Swire Shipping and registered in Hong Kong. She has also sailed under the names, Pacific Challenger, and Changsa.

== Coral Sea oil spill ==
As MV Pacific Adventurer, the vessel was sailing from Newscastle to the Port of Brisbane. During rough seas created by Cyclone Hamish 230 tonnes of fuel oil, 30 tonnes of other fuel and 31 shipping containers (620 tonnes) of ammonium nitrate spilled into the Coral Sea, off the coast from Cape Moreton. 100,000 litres of oil washed up on the coasts of Queensland resulting in the area being declared a disaster zone by Premier Anna Bligh.

The leak was contained before reaching Hamilton Wharf in Brisbane, the nearest port. The ship then leaked oil while docked in the Brisbane River which caused another 500 m long oil slick.

After the Australian Maritime Safety Authority inspected the ship and declared her seaworthy it left Brisbane in April 2009 with a new captain at the helm. In August 2009 the ships owners agreed to pay $25 million compensation. Totals costs for cleaning up after the spill reached $34 million.

== See also ==
- Environmental issues in Australia
