= Cape Moreton =

Point in Australia

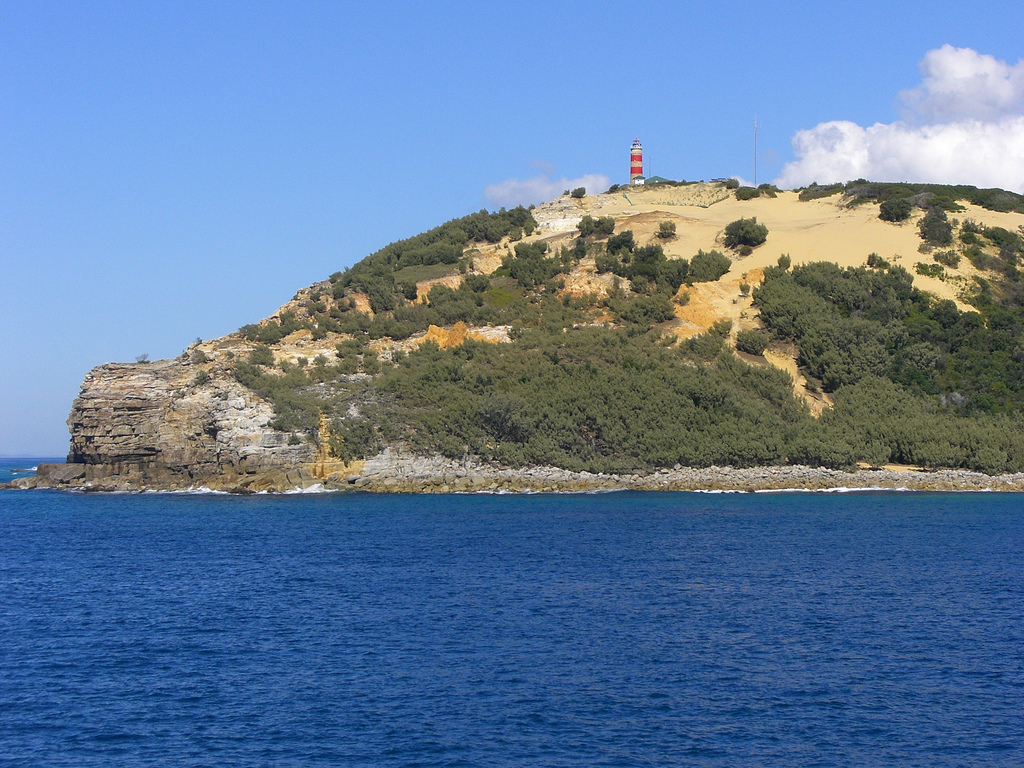
Cape Moreton from sea

Cape Moreton is a rocky headland at the north eastern tip of Moreton Island in South East Queensland, Australia. The surrounding area is part of the Moreton Island National Park. Flinders Reef is 5 kilometres (3 mi) north-west of Cape Moreton.

The outcrop is mostly composed of sandstone, but also some conglomerate, siltstone and shale. The sand dunes of Moreton Island were formed by sand caught on and built up behind these rocks, in a process that began at least 500,000 years ago.

== History ==
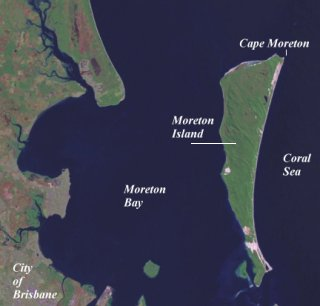
Moreton Bay

On the 17 May 1770, James Cook sighted and named the point Cape Morton. By 1959 the island's second settlement begin at Cape Moreton. At one point a school was operating at Cape Moreton with a total of 15 children. Until 1952 when it was abandoned, a telegraph line reached the point, via Amity on North Stradbroke Island.

On 24 February 1894, the Aarhus sank about two nautical miles from the cape after striking Smith's Rocks. The hospital ship Centaur was sunk close to Cape Moreton in 1943 when a Japanese submarine torpedoed the ship, taking the lives of 268 people. The wreck was found on the 20 December 2009 in a steep walled gulley, 2,059 m below the ocean surface.

The MV Pacific Adventurer lost containers in high seas created by Cyclone Hamish and caused the 2009 southeast Queensland oil spill. The containers were located after a 10-day search, about 7 kilometres (4 mi) off the coast of Cape Moreton.

== Lighthouse ==
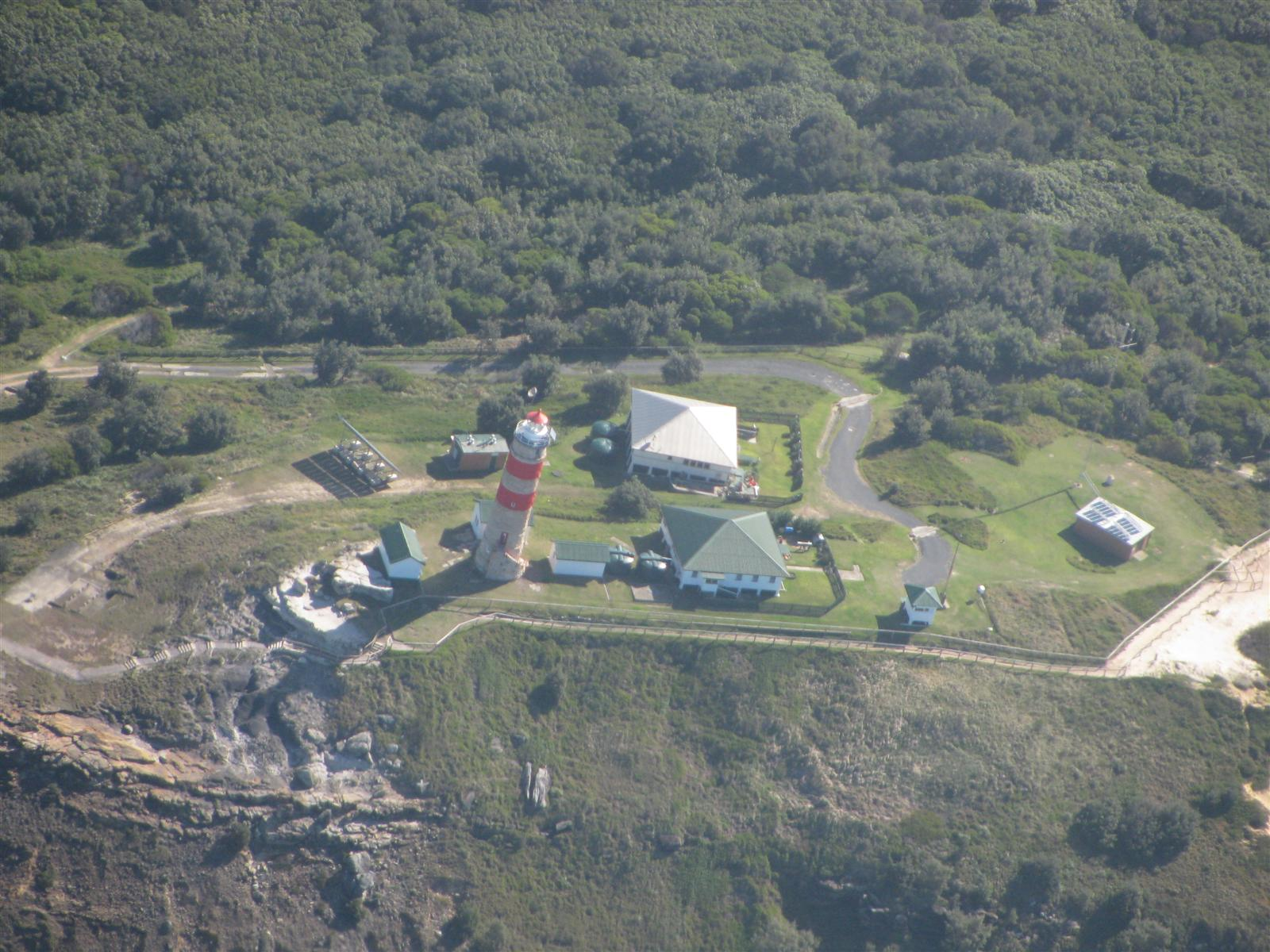
An aerial view of the lightstation

Cape Moreton Light was the first lighthouse established in Queensland. The 23 metres (75 ft) tall structure was constructed of locally quarried sandstone, and was built in 1857. 35 "good conduct" prisoners were used for labour.

A pilot station was established at Bulwer on the northern end of the island in 1848. At one time there was a total of seven lighthouses in operation on the island.

Cape Moreton Lighthouse Complex, consisting of the lighthouse, three keepers' cottages and associated structures, was registered on the Register of the National Estate in 1981.

== See also ==
- Point Lookout
