= Kooringal, Queensland =

Kooringal Queensland
- Coordinates: 27.35°S 153.4205°E
- Population: 43 (2021 census)
  - Density: 220/km^{2} (560/sq mi)
- Postcode(s): 4025
- Area: 0.2 km^{2} (0.1 sq mi)
- Time zone: AEST (UTC+10:00)
- LGA(s): City of Brisbane
- State electorate(s): Redcliffe
- Federal division(s): Bonner
Localities around Kooringal:
Moreton Bay	Moreton Bay	Moreton Island
Moreton Bay	Kooringal	Moreton Island
Moreton Bay	Moreton Bay	Moreton Island

Kooringal is a coastal town and locality on the south-west coast of Moreton Island within the City of Brisbane, Queensland, Australia. In the 2021 census, the locality of Kooringal had a population of 43 people.

== Geography ==
Kooringal consists of a few streets of housing along the south-western tip of Moreton Island. It is connected to the other settlements on the island by two routes:

- the Toulkerrie-Kooringal Bypass Road which travels north through the mangroves along the west coast until the sandy western beach commences. At this point the road becomes known as the Tangalooma-Kooringal Road and travels along the western beach until it reaches Tangalooma.
- the Mirapool Lagoon Bypass Road which crosses the island to the east coast beach, where it becomes the Mirapool - Middle Track Road and follows the eastern beach to the north

Located just to the north-east of the locality is the Kooringal Airstrip (also known as Baroco) which is 500 metres (1,600 ft) long. A vehicular barge service operates from Amity Point to Kooringal at some times of year. Otherwise, vehicles must use the barge to Tangalooma and drive south to Kooringal.

A small island (informally known as Crab Island) is to the north-west of Kooringal and the channel between them is called Days Gutter.

Campbell Point is the point at the southern end of Kooringal Esplanade (27.3553°S 153.4191°E).

The land use is almost entirely residential housing.

== History ==
Campbell Point was named after George Peter Campbell (son of James Campbell), the Secretary of the Brisbane Tug and Steamship Company Ltd. In 1902 he acquired a lease for 66 square miles (170 km^{2}) for most of Moreton Island, noting that the island as a whole is approximately 186 square kilometres (72 sq mi). He built a house and stock yard at this headland. In 1903 he began shipping drought-stricken cattle from western Queensland to the island to fatten them up for sale.

== Demographics ==
In the 2016 census, Moreton Island had a population of 297 people.

In the 2016 census, the locality of Kooringal had a population of 45 people.

In the 2021 census, the locality of Kooringal had a population of 43 people.

== Economy ==
The Toulkerrie Oyster Farm produces fresh Moreton Bay rock oysters; it takes around three years to grow the oysters large enough for the table. The farming process is environmentally sustainable and won the 2010 National Landcare Awards for Sustainable Farm Practices.

== Education ==
There are no schools on Moreton Island. The alternatives are distance education and boarding school.

== Amenities ==
Moorgumpin Park (also known as The Dal Pope Reserve) is at 45 Kooringal Esplanade (27.3529°S 153.4198°E). It has public toilets.

Kooringal Fire Station is at 73 Goondool Street (27.3490°S 153.4221°E).

== Attractions ==
The waters in the Kooringal area are noted for their fishing. Consequently, many of the buildings in Kooringal are holiday homes and fishing clubhouses.
