= Cowan Cowan =

- Town
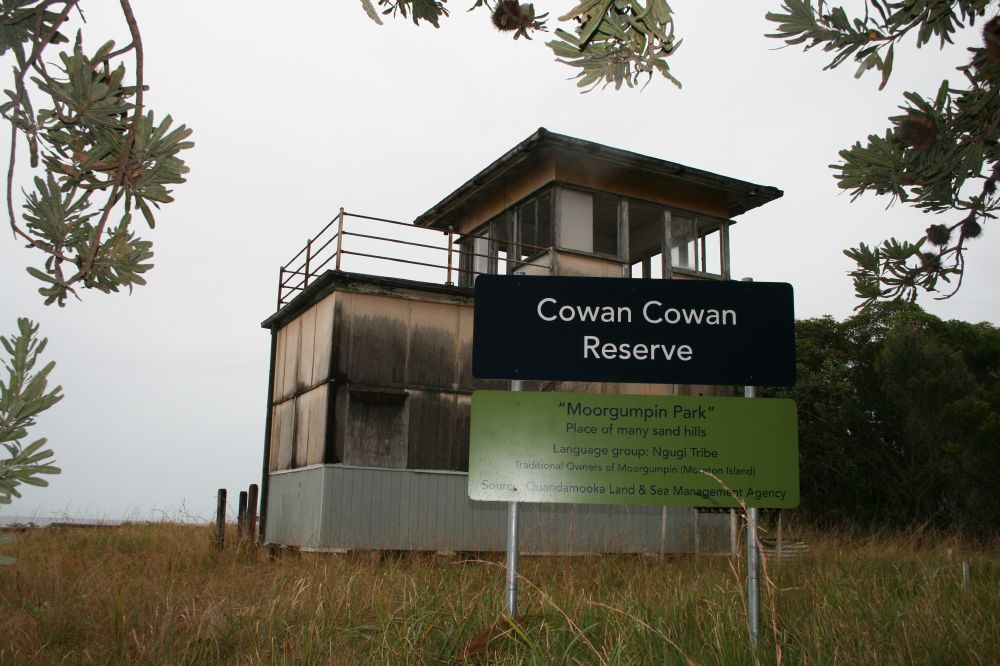
- Former signal station at Cowan Cowan, 2006

- Interactive map of Cowan Cowan
- Coordinates: 27.1258°S 153.3661°E
- Country: Australia
- State: Queensland
- City: Moreton Island
- LGA: City of Brisbane

Government
  - State electorate: Redcliffe
  - Federal division: Bonner

Area
  - Total: 0.1 km^{2} (0.039 sq mi)

Population
  - Total: 27 (2021 census)
  - Density: 270/km^{2} (700/sq mi)
- Time zone: UTC+10:00 (AEST)
- Postcode: 4025
Localities around Cowan Cowan
Moreton Bay	Moreton Island	Moreton Island
Moreton Bay	Cowan Cowan	Moreton Island
Moreton Bay	Moreton Island	Moreton Island

Cowan Cowan is an island town and locality in the City of Brisbane, Queensland, Australia. In the 2021 census, the locality of Cowan Cowan had a population of 27 people.

== Geography ==
Cowan Cowan is on the western coast of Moreton Island facing Moreton Bay. It is surrounded by Gheebulum Kunungai (Moreton Island) National Park.

There are no formal roads connecting Cowan Cowan to other parts of the island, but there are some sand tracks and beaches which can be used by 4WD vehicles.

The land use is predominantly residential, with some of it being holiday rentals.

== Demographics ==
In the 2011 census, Moreton Island (including Cowan Cowan) had a population of 297 people.

In the 2016 census, the locality of Cowan Cowan had a population of 28 people.

In the 2021 census, the locality of Cowan Cowan had a population of 27 people.

== Heritage listings ==
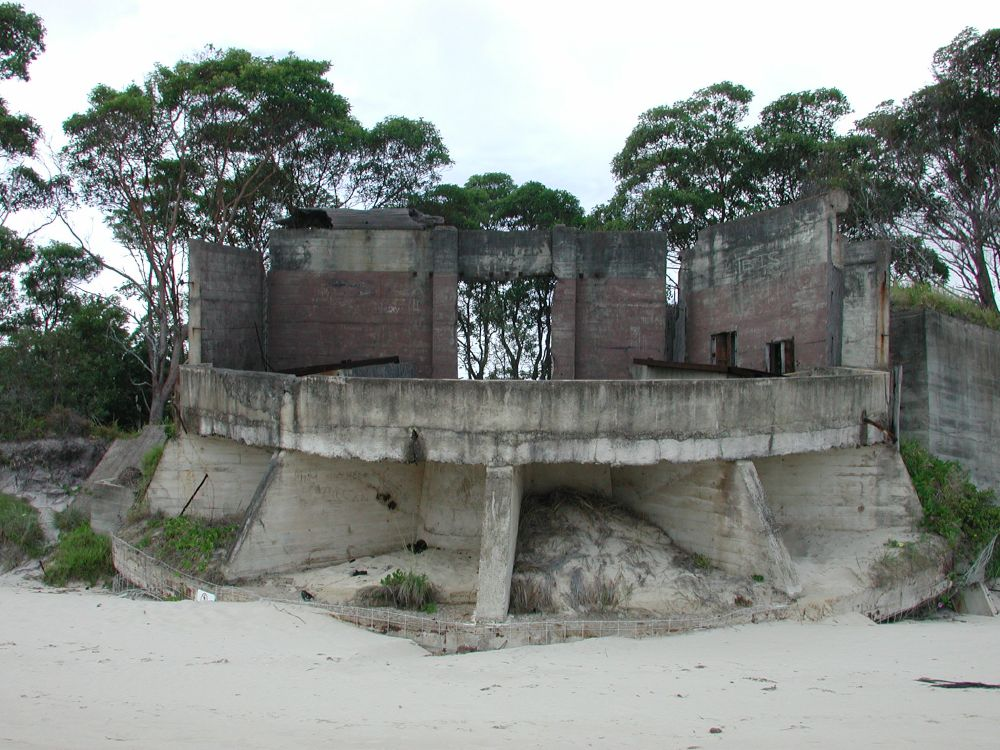
Fort Cowan Cowan, 2012

Cowan Cowan has a number of heritage-listed sites, including:

- Signal Station, Moreton Island, 25 Dorothy Newnham Street (27.1273°S 153.3649°E)
- Fort Cowan Cowan (Cowan Cowan Battery), 30 Jessie Wadsworth Street (27.1255°S 153.3655°E)

== Education ==
There are no schools in Cowan Cowan, nor any nearby. Distance education and boarding schools are the alternatives.

== Amenities ==
There are a number of parks in the area:

- Kakoogun Kin-dapin Reserve at 2A Dorothy Newnham Street (27.1270°S 153.3653°E)
- Park at 30 Jessie Wadsworth Street (27.1261°S 153.3657°E)

== Attractions ==
Just south of Cowan Cowan is the Cowan Cowan Point Light (27.13655°S 153.36282°E).
