= Bulwer, Queensland =

Bulwer
- Town
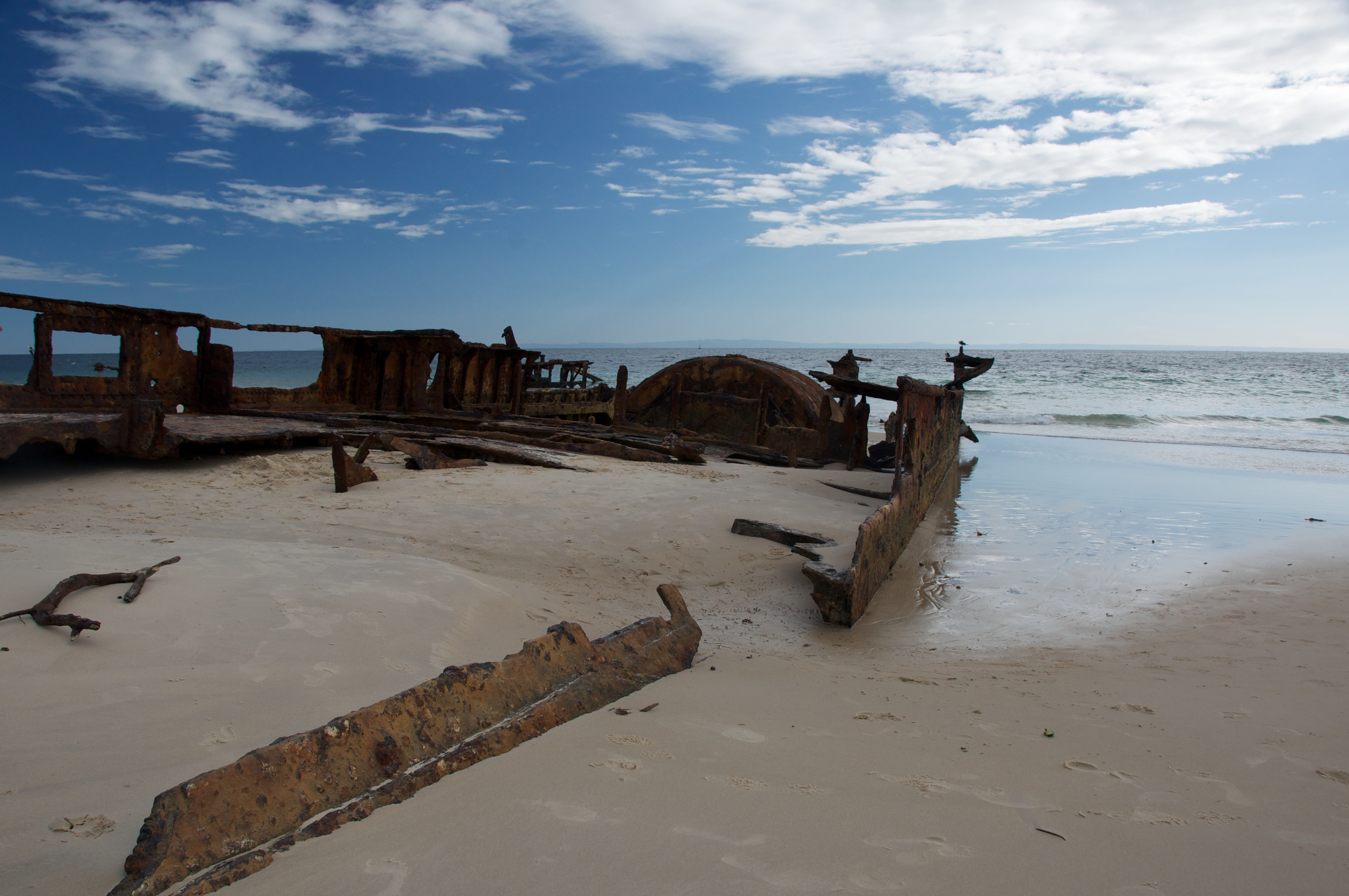
- One of the scuttled ships on the beach at Bulwer, 2011

- Interactive map of Bulwer
- Coordinates: 27.0786°S 153.3697°E
- Country: Australia
- State: Queensland
- LGA: City of Brisbane (Deagon Ward)

Government
  - State electorate: Redcliffe
  - Federal division: Bonner

Area
  - Total: 0.4 km^{2} (0.15 sq mi)

Population
  - Total: 59 (2021 census)
  - Density: 148/km^{2} (380/sq mi)
- Time zone: UTC+10:00 (AEST)
- Postcode: 4025
Localities around Bulwer
Moreton Bay	Moreton Island	Moreton Island
Moreton Bay	Bulwer	Moreton Island
Moreton Bay	Moreton Island	Moreton Island

Bulwer (/ˈbʊlwər/ BUUL-wər) is a coastal town and locality at the north-western end of Moreton Island in the City of Brisbane, Queensland, Australia. In the 2021 census, the locality of Bulwer had a population of 59 people.

== Geography ==
Bulwer is on the north-west coast of Moreton Island facing Moreton Bay. It is 40 kilometres (25 mi) to the Brisbane central business district. It is one of the few developed areas on Moreton Island which is almost entirely national park (Moreton Island National Park). It consists of a few streets of housing and a long sandy beach. There are no formal road connections to Bulwer, but there are dirt tracks that connect it to other parts of the island.

== History ==
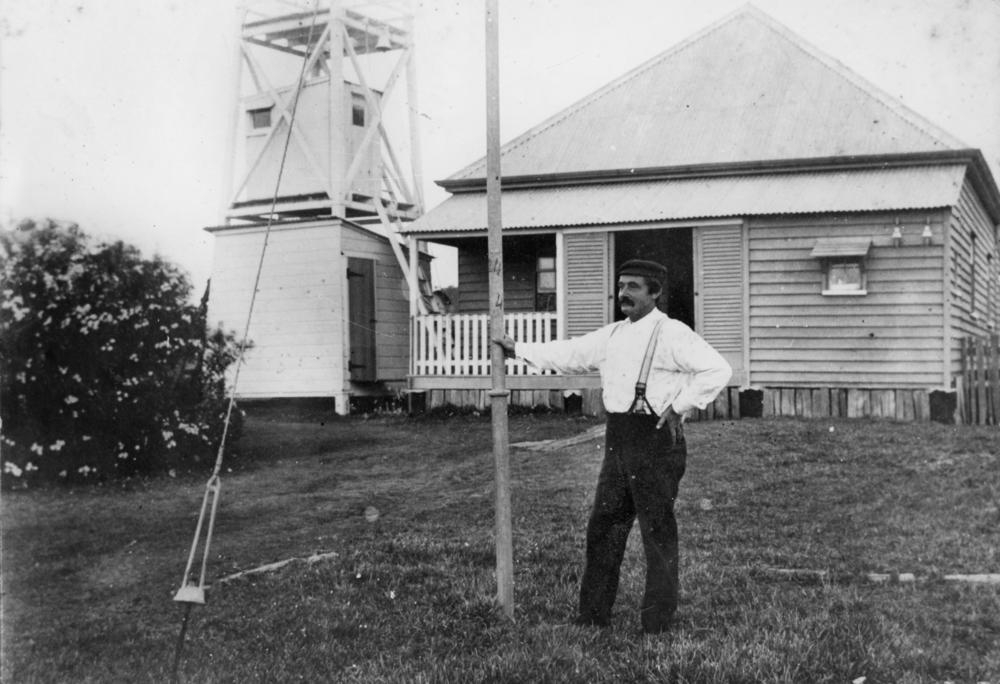
James Palmer, pilot station keeper at the pilot station house at Bulwer, 1908

Bulwer was probably named after Lord Edward Bulwer-Lytton (1803–1873) who was Secretary of State for the Colonies from 1858 to 1859. The British Colonial Secretary separated Queensland from New South Wales in 1859 and made Sir George Bowen its first Governor.

In August 1848, the maritime pilot station on Moreton Bay was moved from Amity Point on the northerly tip of North Stradbroke Island to Bulwer. In 1863 land was offered for sale at Bulwer for the first time, contesting of 36 lots each of 2 roods with 25 sold.

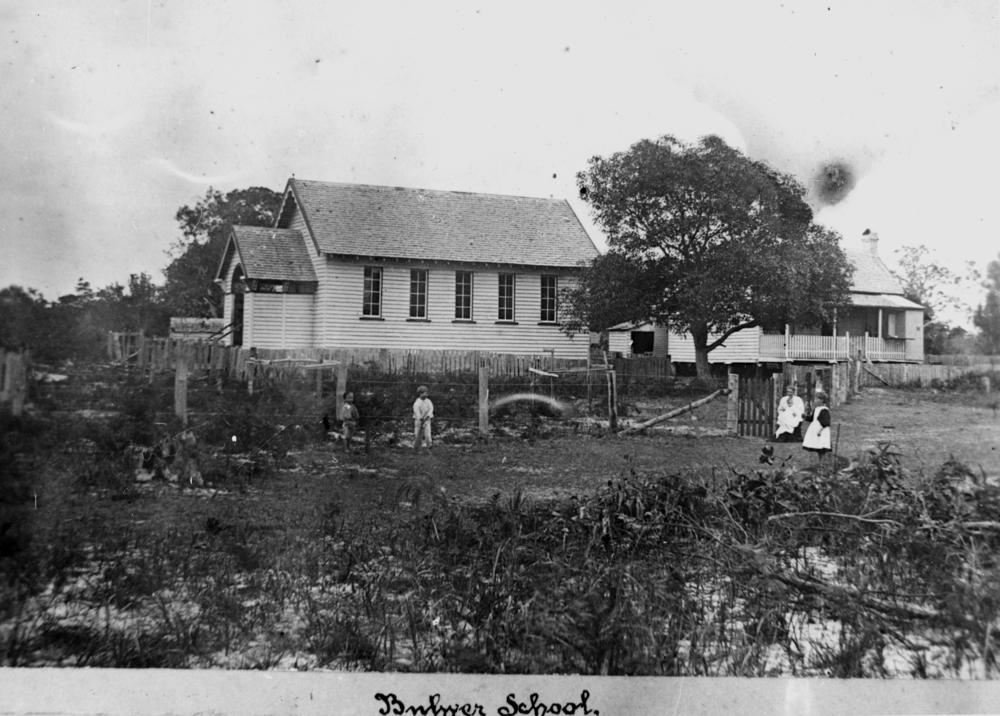
Cricket match at Bulwer State School, Queensland, 1899. Group of children playing cricket in the grounds of Bulwer State School, on Moreton Island, in 1899. The teacher's residence is next to the school.

In November 1865 a school and teacher's residence were erected but a teacher had not been appointed. The families of the staff of the pilot station were the principal residents at that time. That school opened in 1866-1867.

In April 1875, the Queensland Government set aside 2 roods for a government school (suggesting the previous school was operated privately). Moreton Island State School opened circa 1876 and was renamed Bulwer State School in 1878. In 1891 it was downgraded to a provisional school, but restored to state school status in 1895.

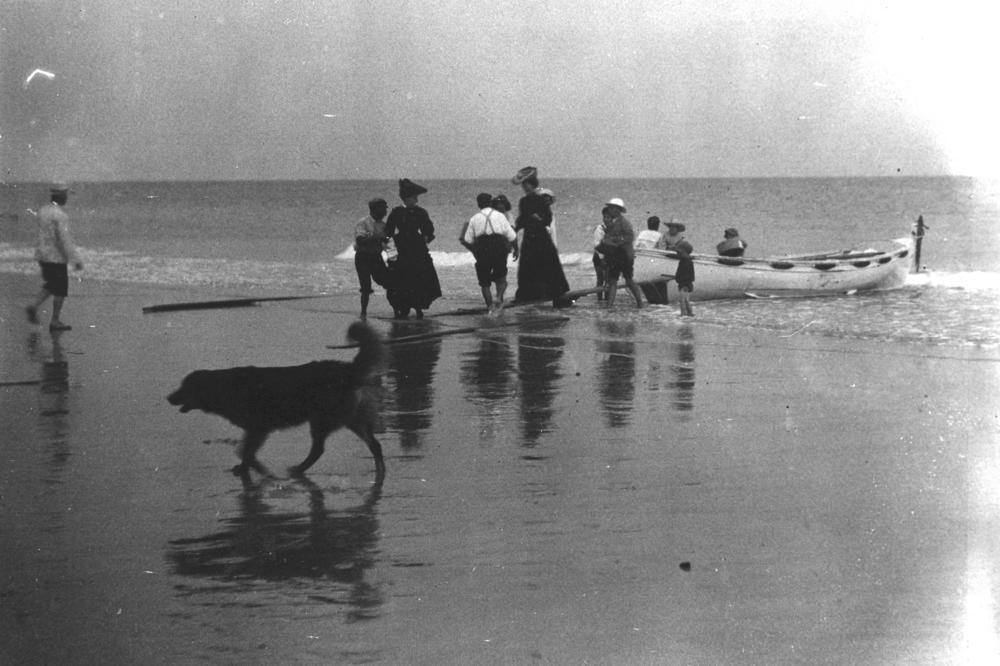
Landing a boat at Bulwer, 1906

In November 1909 it was decided that the pilots and their families would live in Brisbane, with the pilots being based on a steamer in the Yellow Patch (the part of Moreton Bay to the north of Moreton Island near the entrance to the shipping channel to Brisbane) when on duty; the pilots approved the plan. The state school was closed in 1909 when the pilots' families ceased to live on the island.

In the 1930s, three ships were scuttled in the area to form a harbour for small boats. The first on 8 May 1933 was the 337-ton steamer Hopewell formerly owned by timber merchants Hyne & Son of Maryborough. The second on 10 May 1933 was the 716-ton Mount Kembla. The third in September 1935 was the Kallatina, a 646 ton passenger and cargo ship owned by John Edward Burke which operated a route from Brisbane through to the Gulf of Carpentaria. Although the intention was to provide a safe harbour, during a storm in July 1938 the 35-foot motor launch Achilles struck the half-sunken Mount Kembla and sank within 15 minutes, the 12 men on board Achilles climbed onto the Mount Kembla until they were rescued by Robert Alexander Gow in his dinghy.

== Demographics ==
In the 2006 census, the locality of Bulwer had a population of 70 people.

In the 2016 census, the locality of Bulwer had a population of 49 people.

In the 2021 census, the locality of Bulwer had a population of 59 people.

== Transport ==
Bulwer is accessible from Brisbane on the mainland via the Micat Barge service. It is one of the main access points for visitors to the island, 98% of which is in the Moreton Island National Park.

== Education ==
There are no schools in Bulwer, nor on Moreton Island as a whole. Distance education or boarding school are options.

== Facilities ==
Facilities at Bulwer include a helipad and first aid station as well as holiday accommodation, a general store and public phone.

Bulwer Park is at 100 Moreton Street (27.0721°S 153.3681°E). It includes the helipad and a toilet.

Moreton Island SES Facility is at 46 Moreton Street (27.0792°S 153.3705°E).

Bulwer Rural Fire Station is at 84 Moreton Street (27.0747°S 153.3700°E).
