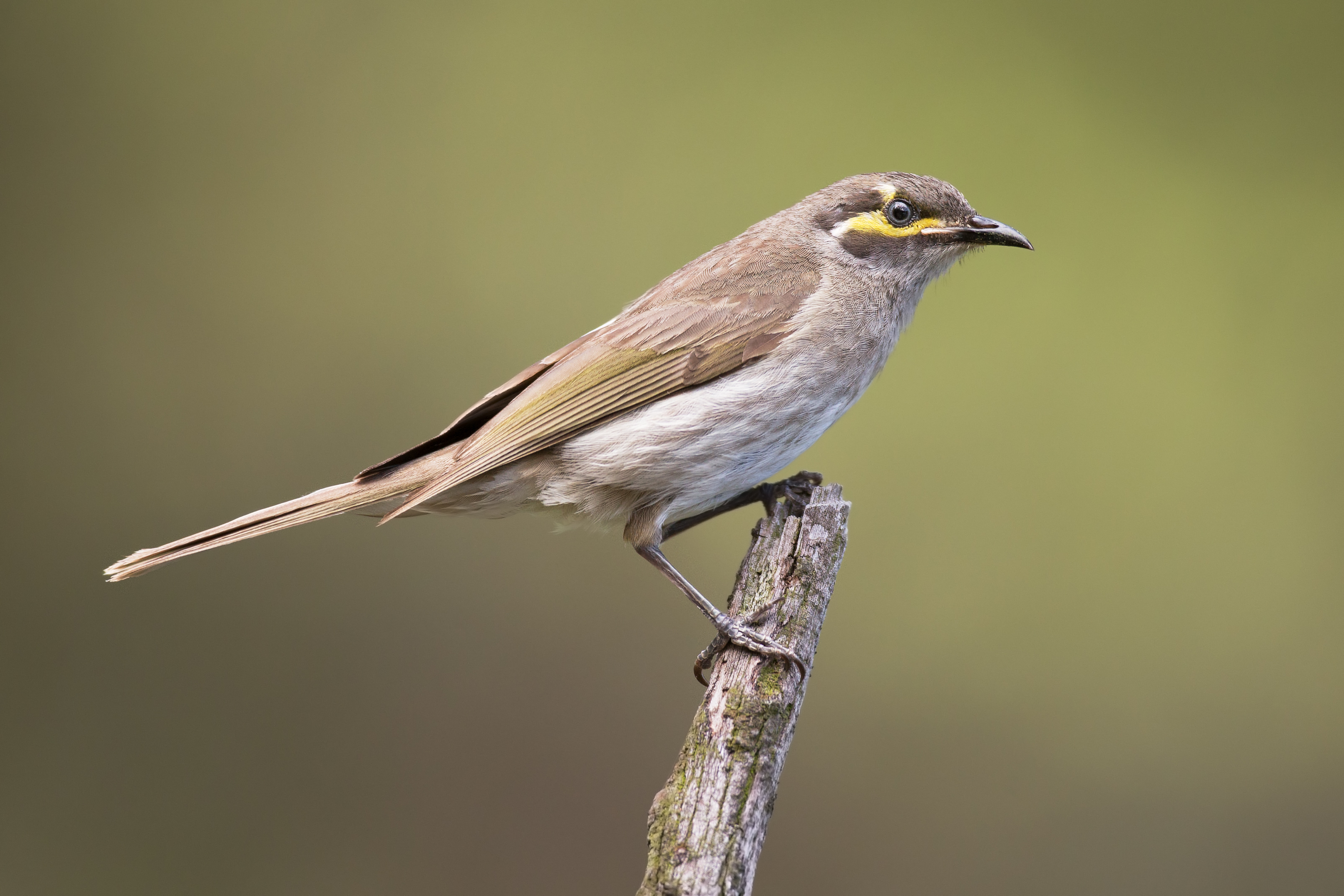

Conservation status
- Least Concern (IUCN 3.1)

Scientific classification
- Kingdom: Animalia
- Phylum: Chordata
- Class: Aves
- Order: Passeriformes
- Family: Meliphagidae
- Genus: Caligavis
- Species: C. chrysops

Binomial name
- Caligavis chrysops (Latham, 1801)
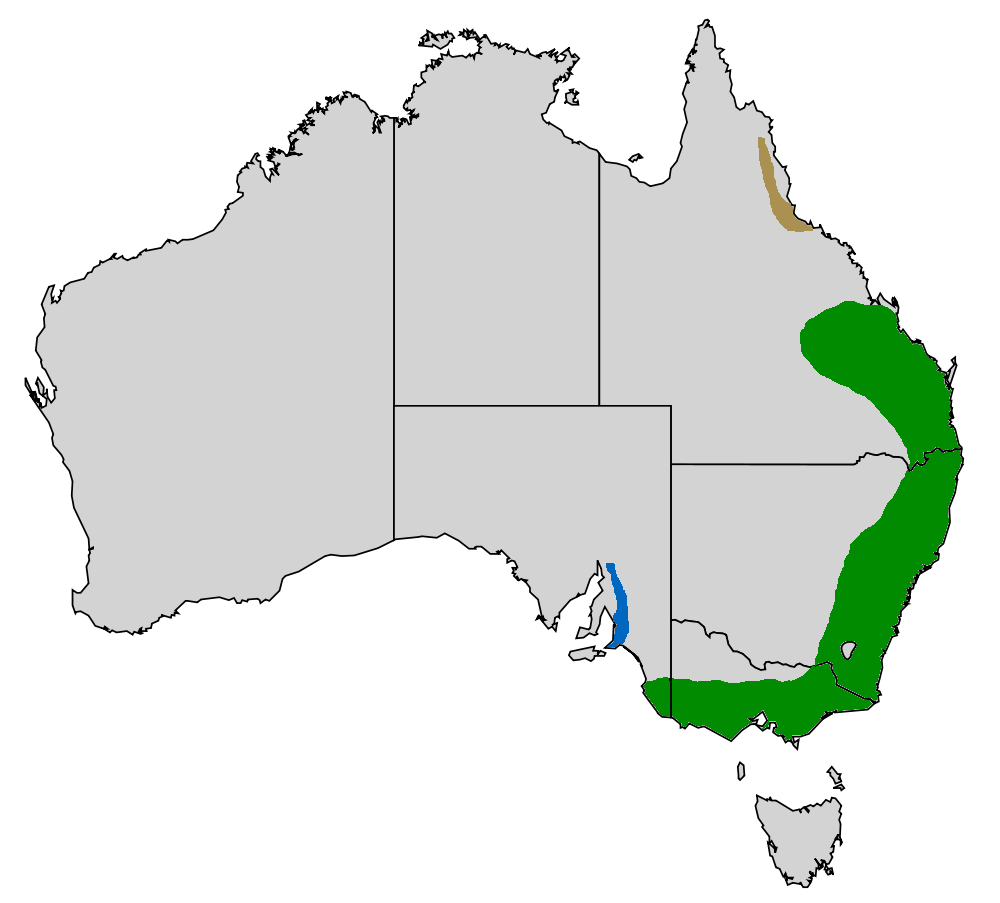
- Yellow-faced honeyeater natural range subsp. barroni — olive subsp. chrysops — green subsp. samueli — blue

Synonyms
- Sylvia chrysops Latham, 1801; Lichenostomus chrysops (Latham, 1802); Melithreptus gilvicapillus Vieillot, 1817; Ptilotis trivirgata G.R. Gray, 1869

= Yellow-faced honeyeater =

Species of bird in the family Meliphagidae

The yellow-faced honeyeater (Caligavis chrysops) is a small to medium-sized bird in the honeyeater family, Meliphagidae. It takes its common and scientific names from the distinctive yellow stripes on the sides of its head. Its loud, clear call often begins twenty or thirty minutes before dawn. It is widespread across eastern and southeastern Australia, in open sclerophyll forests from coastal dunes to high-altitude subalpine areas, and woodlands along creeks and rivers. Comparatively short-billed for a honeyeater, it is thought to have adapted to a diet of flies, spiders, and beetles, as well as nectar and pollen from the flowers of plants, such as Banksia and Grevillea, and soft fruits. It catches insects in flight as well as gleaning them from the foliage of trees and shrubs.

Some yellow-faced honeyeaters are sedentary, but hundreds of thousands migrate northwards between March and May to spend the winter in southern Queensland, and return in July and August to breed in southern New South Wales and Victoria. They form socially monogamous pairs and lay two or three eggs in a delicate cup-shaped nest. The success rate can be low, and the pairs nest several times during the breeding season.

Honeyeaters' preferred woodland habitat is vulnerable to the effects of land-clearing, grazing, and weeds. As it is common and widespread, the yellow-faced honeyeater is considered by the International Union for Conservation of Nature (IUCN) to be of least concern for conservation. It is considered a pest in orchards in some areas.

== Taxonomy ==
The yellow-faced honeyeater was first described, and placed in the genus Sylvia, by ornithologist John Latham in his 1801 work Supplementum Indicis Ornithologici, sive Systematis Ornithologiae. French ornithologist Louis Pierre Vieillot described it as Melithreptus gilvicapillus in 1817, and English zoologist George Robert Gray as Ptilotis trivirgata in 1869. The specific name chrysops is derived from the Ancient Greek words chrysos meaning 'gold' and prosopo meaning 'face', in reference to the stripe of yellow feathers.

The yellow-faced honeyeater was classified in the genera Meliphaga and then Lichenostomus until 2011. Delineating the latter genus had been systematically contentious, and evaluations of relationships among honeyeaters in the genus, using dense taxon and nucleotide sampling, confirmed previous findings that Lichenostomus is not monophyletic. Five species have previously been described as comprising the Caligavis subgroup, but studies, using the mitochondrial DNA, identified the yellow-faced honeyeater as most closely related to the black-throated honeyeater (C. subfrenatus) and the obscure honeyeater (C. obscurus) of New Guinea; they were, therefore, grouped into the genus Caligavis. The generic name derives from the Latin caligo 'mist, obscurity' and avis 'bird'. The bridled honeyeater (B. frenatus) and the Eungella honeyeater (B. hindwoodi) were sufficiently different to be placed in a separate genus as Bolemoreus. A 2017 genetic study, using both mitochondrial and nuclear DNA, found the ancestor of the yellow-faced honeyeater diverged from the common ancestor of the other two Caligavis species around seven million years ago.

There are three subspecies of the yellow-faced honeyeater, two of which were described by Gregory Mathews in 1912. There are only very slight differences between the nominate race and C. c. samueli found in the Mount Lofty Ranges in South Australia, and C. c. barroni from the Clarke Range and the Atherton Tableland in Queensland. The latter race is described as "poorly differentiated" and "possibly not worthy of recognition" by the Handbook of the Birds of the World.

The Surgeon-General of New South Wales John White caught a specimen in May 1788 calling it a yellow-faced flycatcher in his Journal of a Voyage to New South Wales, which was published in 1790. Latham called it the black-cheeked warbler. John Gould called it the yellow-faced honeyeater in 1848, which has become its official name. It is also known as the yellow-gaped honeyeater, or the quitchup, in reference to its call.

== Description ==
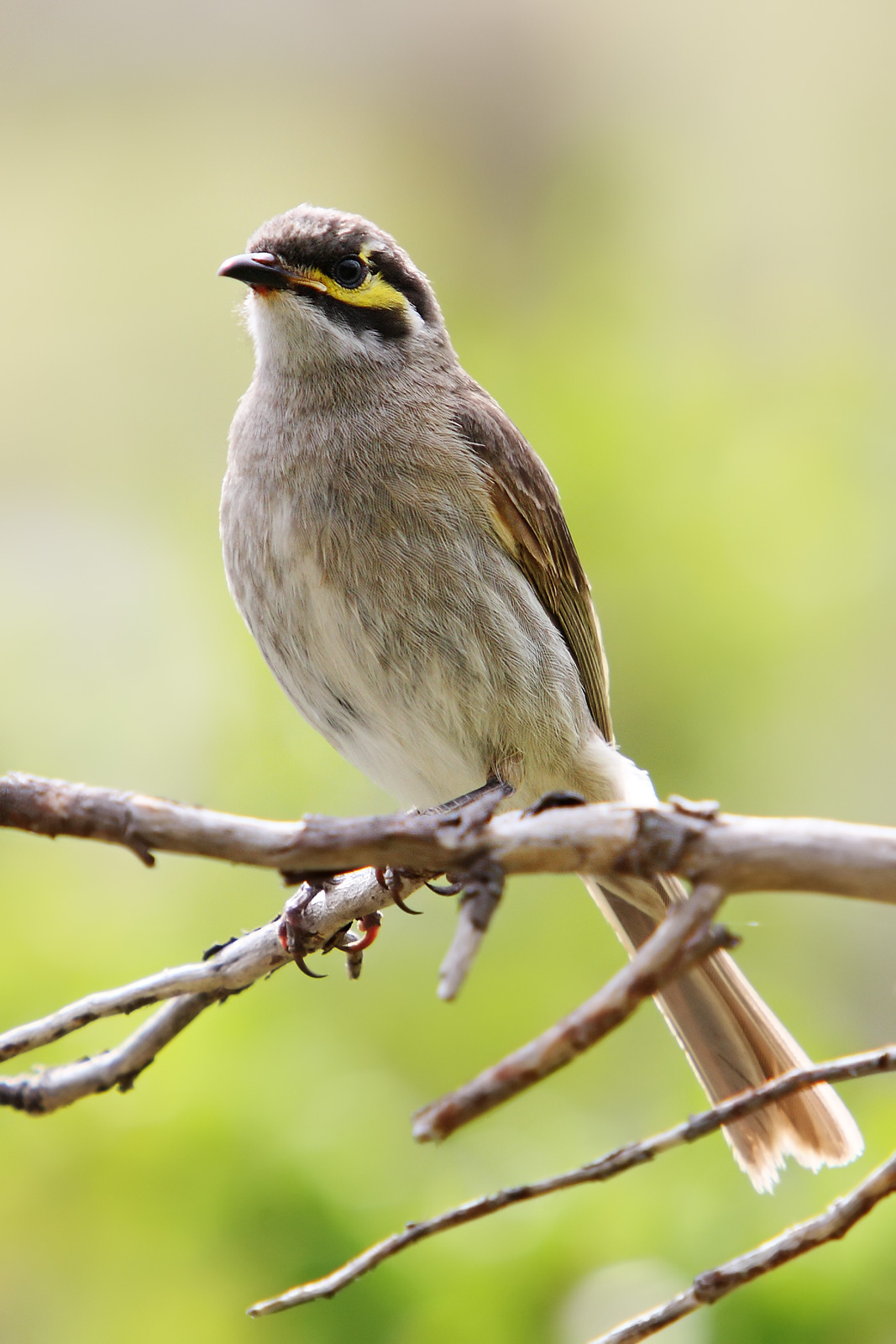
A distinctive yellow stripe runs below the eye.

=== Appearance ===
The yellow-faced honeyeater is a medium-small, greyish-brown bird that takes its common name from distinctive yellow stripes on the sides of the head. Yellow feathers form a narrow stripe above the gape, which broadens and curves below the eye to end in a small white patch of feathers on the ear coverts. Above the yellow stripe is a black eye stripe which is broken by a small yellow to off-white patch behind the eye, and below is another distinct black stripe running the length of the yellow line. The chin, throat, and breast are a pale greyish-brown, streaked with slightly darker grey, and the abdomen is light grey. The upper body is a dark greyish-brown to olive-brown. Olive-green outer edges on the remiges combine to form an olive panel on the folded wing. The bill is black and slightly down-curved, and the gape is cream. The legs and feet are grey-brown. The iris is a dusky blue in adult birds, and brown in juveniles. The juvenile is very similar to the adult, with slightly less streaking on the breast, an orange-brown tip on the bill, and a yellower gape; male and female birds are also similar, with the male being slightly larger (on average, 0.8 g (0.03 oz) heavier); and in the field there are no visible differences between the subspecies. The yellow-faced honeyeater averages 15–17.5 centimetres (5.9–6.9 in) in length, with a wingspan of 21.5–26 cm (8.5–10.2 in), and a weight of 12.5–20.5 grams (0.44–0.72 oz), with an average of 17 g (0.60 oz)).

=== Vocalizations ===
One of the first birds heard in the morning, the yellow-faced honeyeater utters calls that are full and loud, and extremely varied. The male sings from a roost for up to an hour, beginning twenty or thirty minutes before dawn. The song is a running series of cheerful notes sounding like chick-up, chick-up, from which its common name of quitchup is derived. Counter-singing (repeating the first bird's song) by neighbouring birds is common. The territorial call, also given by opponents during fights, is a long preet with an upward inflection. The alarm call is a loud trilling whistle. Common calls, thought to be contact calls, are animated two-note calls variously described as terric, terric, cr-rook, cr-rook or put-put, put-put.

== Distribution and habitat ==
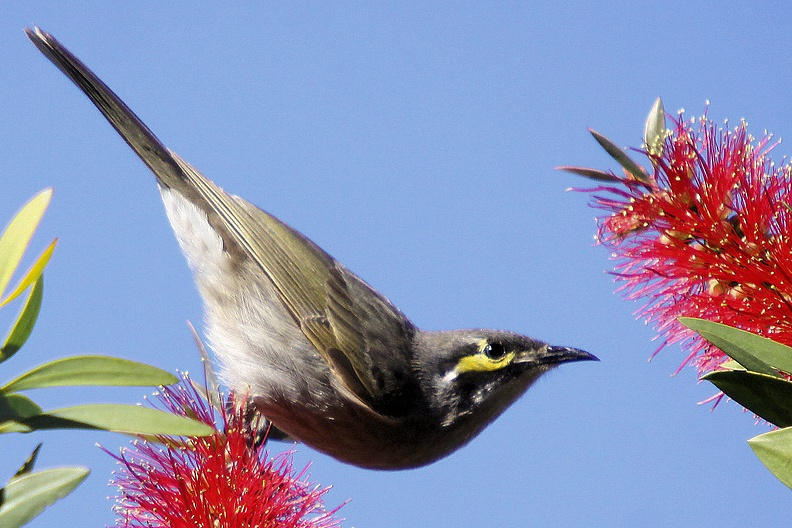
The yellow-faced honeyeater can be seen feeding on garden shrubs.

=== Habitat ===
Across its range, the yellow-faced honeyeater is found in a variety of habitats—in open sclerophyll forests from coastal dunes to high-altitude subalpine areas, and often in riparian woodlands. It most commonly dwells in open forests dominated by spotted gum (Corymbia maculata) with ironbarks and stringybarks, such as narrow-leaved ironbark (Eucalyptus crebra) and silver-leaved ironbark (E. melanophloia), with a light, shrubby understorey, and less often in dry, open forests and woodlands dominated by Angophora, Acacia, Banksia, Casuarina or Callitris, or in high-altitude, tall, open forests of alpine ash (Eucalyptus delegatensis) and woodlands dominated by snow gum (E. pauciflora) or white box (E. albens). It has been recorded in coastal heath when banksias are blooming, and among flowering mangroves. It occupies areas infested with weeds, such as Scotch broom (Cytisus scoparius) and blackberries, and in developed areas including orchards, parks and gardens, where it feeds on cultivated fruit and flowers. It can be found in forests regenerating after fire or logging, though it is more common in mature forests. Where it is found in woodland, it is usually woodland near forest or with an understory of sclerophyll plants.

=== Range ===
The yellow-faced honeyeater ranges across a broad arc generally along the coastline from near Cooktown in Far North Queensland, and between a line from Charters Towers south to Albury and the coast, and then west to the Fleurieu Peninsula and the Mount Lofty Ranges in South Australia. Population densities have been recorded from 0.01 birds per hectare (2.5 acres) near Armidale in New South Wales to 7.8 birds per hectare at Tarnagulla, Victoria. During the winter months of June and July, numbers are generally lower in Victoria and higher in Queensland, following their northward migration.

=== Migration ===
There are resident populations of the yellow-faced honeyeater throughout its range, but it is for the most part a seasonal, latitudinal, daytime migrant. During the autumn (March to May), it migrates north along the highlands and coastal fringe of eastern Australia to southern Queensland, to return in the spring (August to October) of the same year. The birds commonly move in flocks of 10 to 100 birds, but occasionally in larger groups of 1,000 or more. The groups can include other species, such as the white-naped honeyeater, fuscous honeyeater, noisy friarbird, and silvereye. They move in successive flocks at a rate of up to several thousand birds an hour. Over 100,000 birds were recorded passing Hastings Point in New South Wales over the course of a single day in May 1965. The species is able to detect geomagnetic fields, and uses them to navigate while migrating. Experiments, where the vertical component of the magnetic field was reversed, indicate that the magnetic compass of the yellow-faced honeyeater is based on the inclination of the field lines and not on polarity, meaning they distinguish between the direction of the equator and the South Pole, rather than north and south. Their flight is in one general direction, but is not in a straight line, as the flocks stay in vegetated areas, negotiate gaps in the mountain ranges, and detour around cities.

The migration of many birds in Australia, including honeyeaters, has generally been described as occurring mainly in response to external environmental stimuli, such as food availability or an influx of water. The yellow-faced honeyeater has been found to have a broad range of characteristics that are more often associated with Northern Hemisphere migrants. These are an annual cycle of migratory restlessness, seasonally appropriate orientation based on magnetic, solar and polarised light cues, and a migration program based on the magnetic inclination compass.

== Behaviour ==
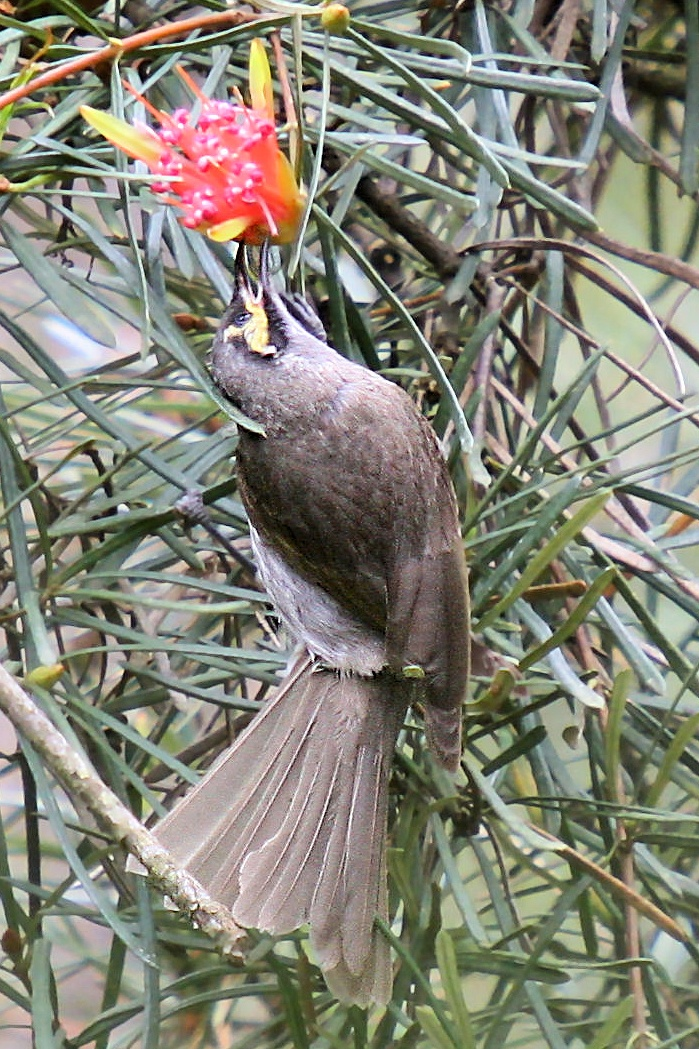
Piercing the base of a mountain devil (Lambertia formosa) flower to feed on nectar

The yellow-faced honeyeater is usually seen singly, in pairs or in small family groups, when not migrating. They forage as individuals, as pairs or as small groups of up to ten birds, and during migration in larger groups. They sometimes feed in large, mixed-species, foraging flocks, composed predominately of insectivorous birds.

=== Feeding ===
Comparatively short-billed for a honeyeater, the yellow-faced honeyeater is thought to have adapted to a mixed diet. Its diet consists of nectar, pollen, fruit, seeds, honeydew, and insects. It is arboreal, foraging primarily among the foliage and flowers of trees, shrubs, and mistletoes, less often on branches and tree-trunk, and rarely on the ground. Yellow-faced honeyeaters feed on nectar around 40% of the time, and on insects around 60% of the time. The yellow-faced honeyeater feeds on insects by gleaning, sallying, catching in flight, or probing in bark crevices. The insects eaten are primarily Diptera (flies, mosquitoes, maggots, gnats, and midges), beetles, and spiders. A study of the pollen on the bills and foreheads of captured birds found that 70% carried pollen from silver banksia (Banksia marginata), 61% from heath-leaved banksia (Banksia ericifolia), and 22% carried pollen from other plants in the area including fern-leaved banksia (Banksia oblongifolia), mountain devil (Lambertia formosa), and green spider-flower (Grevillea mucronulata).

In April and May, before the autumn migration, the yellow-faced honeyeater increases its nectar consumption, which increases its body mass. The average body mass in late autumn of 17.5 grams (0.62 oz) is 13% higher than the average recorded between January and April, and the yellow-faced honeyeater begins the migration with healthy fat reserves.

=== Breeding ===
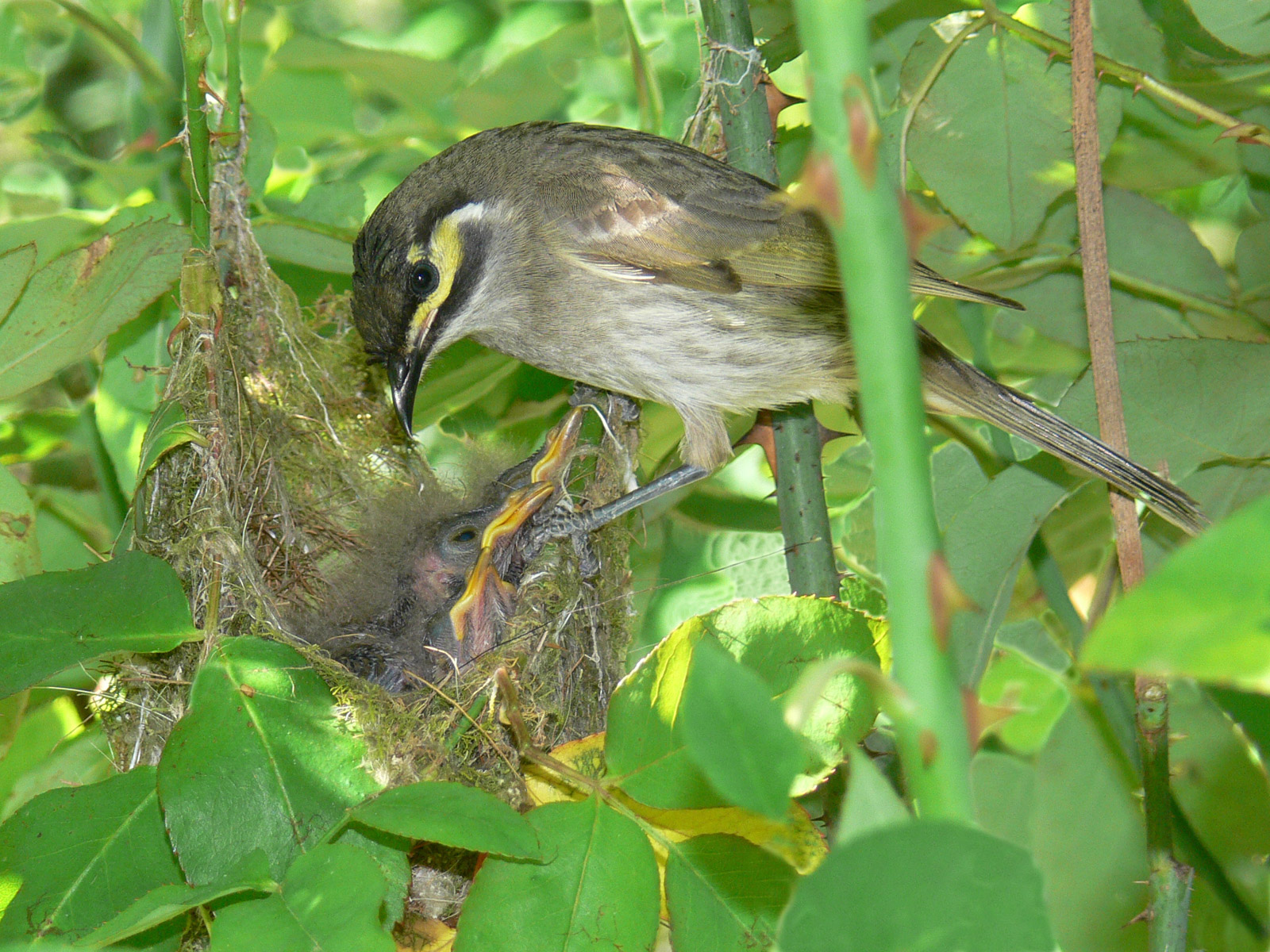
Three chicks are raised in a flimsy nest in a garden shrub.

The yellow-faced honeyeater breeds in monogamous pairs in a breeding season that extends from July to March, with migrating birds nesting later than sedentary birds. They nest solitarily in all-purpose territories that both parents defend against conspecifics and other species including thornbills, spinebills and silvereyes, although the male is involved in more aggressive interactions than the female. Within a breeding season, females lay two or three clutches of eggs, re-nesting with the same partner in the same territory. Banded birds have been identified in the same territory for periods of up to five years.

The nest is built in the understorey shrubs, relatively close to the ground. Nests have been recorded in prickly coprosma (Coprosma quadrifida), Cassinia, tea-trees (Melaleuca), eucalypts and acacias, as well as in garden shrubs. The nest is a fragile, cup-shaped structure, swollen at the sides and narrower at the rim. The female builds the nest, but is often accompanied by the male as she gathers nesting material. Most nests are built of greenish material, which varies with the location; in coastal areas, grass is the primary material; in mountain forests, the nest is often covered with moss. One bird was recorded repeatedly flying between the nest and a koala 36 metres (118 ft) away and plucking the long hair near its ears to incorporate in the nest. The nests are very fine, with the eggs visible through the gauze-like walls, and they sometimes fall apart. They have been known to disintegrate with eggs and nestlings falling through the bottom.

The female undertakes the incubation alone. Eggs are oval, approximately 21 millimetres (0.83 in) long and 14 millimetres (0.55 in) wide, and pinkish white in colour with spots and blotches of dark reddish-brown. The clutch size varies from one to three eggs, and eggs take around two weeks to hatch. Upon hatching, both parents feed the nestlings and remove faecal pellets. The chicks fledge after thirteen days, and leave the parental territory after a further two weeks. The success rate can be as low as 16% of eggs developing into fledged young, with nest failure, hot weather, heavy rain, human activity (including fungicide spraying and nest damage), egg destruction by brood parasites, and predation by brown snakes, cats, and currawongs, all recorded as contributing to brood failure. Among the species that parasitize the nests of yellow-faced honeyeaters are fan-tailed cuckoos, brush cuckoos, pallid cuckoos, shining bronze-cuckoos, and Horsfield's bronze-cuckoos. The yellow-faced honeyeater promptly nests again after both successful and failed breeding attempts.

A paternity analysis of yellow-faced honeyeater nestlings found that 10 of 18 nestlings were fathered by the male of the nesting pair, with clear evidence for extra-pair paternity in the case of the remaining 44%. This conflicts with the usual pattern, where genetic monogamy is linked to the characteristics of strong social pairing, essential paternal contributions to brood-rearing, and to sexual monomorphism; characteristics that are exhibited by the yellow honeyeater, for example.

== Conservation status ==
Several ectoparasites, which can affect survival and reproductive fitness, have been found on the yellow-faced honeyeater: the mites, Ptilonyssus meliphagae and P. thymanzae, and Ixodes species ticks.

In general, honeyeaters require extensive corridors of mature trees along their migratory routes, and flowering woodlands for nesting, so they are vulnerable to the effects of land-clearing, grazing and weed infestation. The woodland habitat they prefer is considered an endangered ecological community. As it is common and widespread, the yellow-faced honeyeater is considered by the IUCN to be of least concern for conservation. A field experiment to determine whether yellow-faced honeyeater nests were less successful in fragmented habitats found that nests closer to forest margins actually had a higher success rate than those deeper in the forest. However, the yellow-faced honeyeater tends to nest away from the edge of forest remnants; experiments with natural and artificial nests at varying distances from the open areas showed no increase in the number of avian predators at the forest edge. The results of the field experiment did not support the "ecological trap" and "predator influx" theories, and contribute to a belief that fragmented habitats may not be as problematic as previously thought. In some areas, the species is considered a pest because of its intrusion into orchards and urban gardens, where it damages fruit.

== Bibliography ==
- Beruldsen, Gordon (1980). A Field Guide to Nests and Eggs of Australian Birds. Adelaide, S.A.: Rigby. ISBN 978-0-7270-1202-9.
- Higgins, Peter; Peter, J. M.; Steele, W. K. (2001). "Lichenostomus chrysops Yellow-faced Honeyeater". Handbook of Australian, New Zealand and Antarctic Birds Volume 5: Tyrant-flycatchers to Chats. Melbourne, Vic.: Oxford University Press. pp. 724–740. ISBN 978-0-19-553071-1.
- Higgins, Peter; Christidis, Les; Ford, Hugh (2008). "Family Meliphagidae (Honeyeaters)". In del Hoyo, Josep; Elliott, Andrew; Christie, David (eds.). Handbook of the Birds of the World Volume 13: Penduline-tits to Shrikes. Barcelona: Lynx Edicions. pp. 597–598. ISBN 978-84-96553-45-3.
- Munro, Ursula (2003). "Life History and Ecophysical Adaptations to Migration in Australian Birds". In Berthold, Peter; Gwinner, Eberhard; Sonnenschein, E. (eds.). Avian Migration. New York: Springer-Verlag. pp. 141–154. ISBN 978-3-540-43408-5.
- Officer, Hugh R. (1965). Australian Honeyeaters. Melbourne, Vic.: The Bird Observers Club, Melbourne. ISBN 978-0-909711-03-0.
