= Australian mangroves =

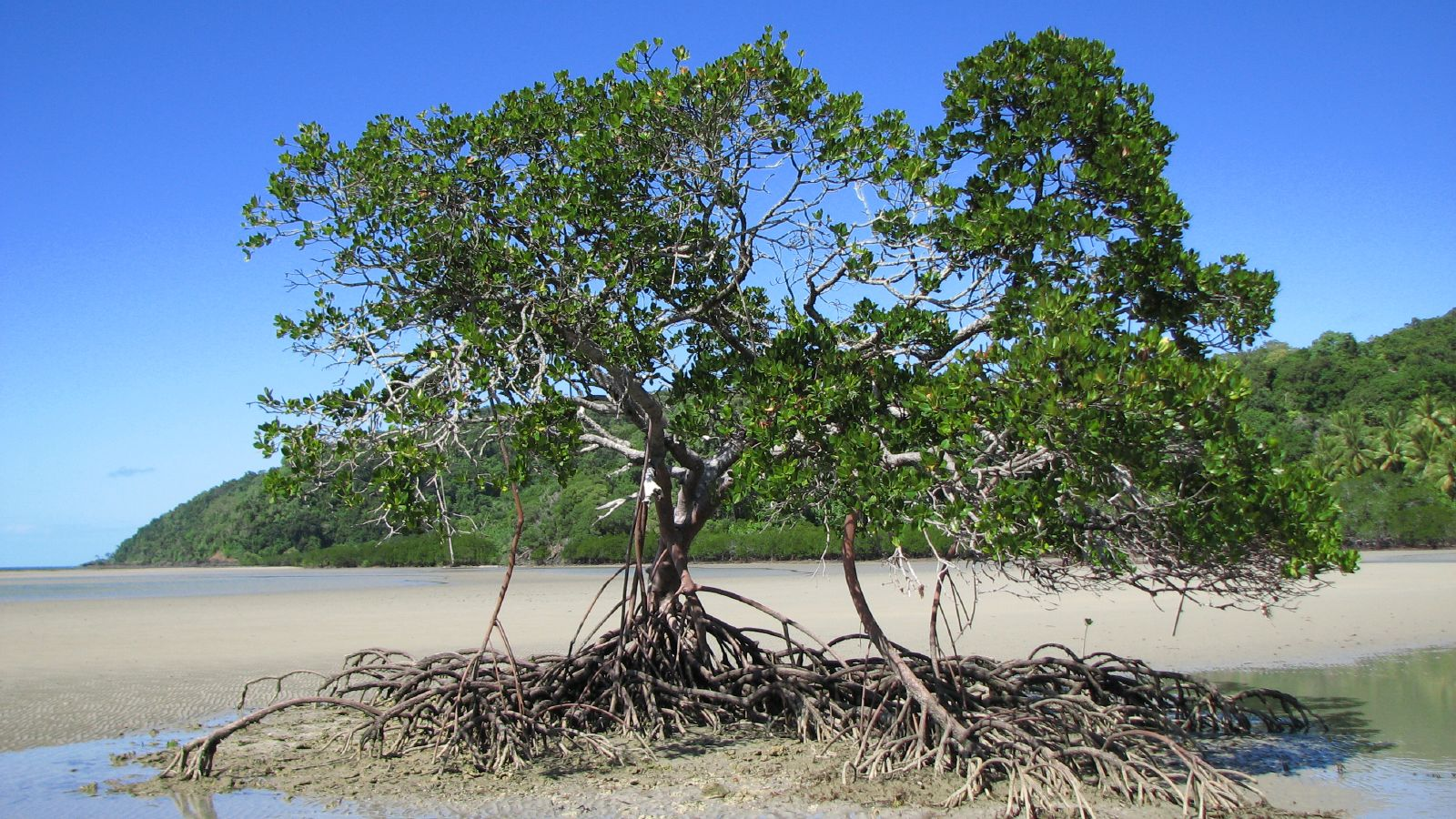
- Mangrove in Cooktown, Queensland, Australia

Ecology
- Realm: Australasian realm
- Biome: mangroves

Geography
- Country: Australia
- States: Queensland; Northern Territory; Western Australia; New South Wales; South Australia

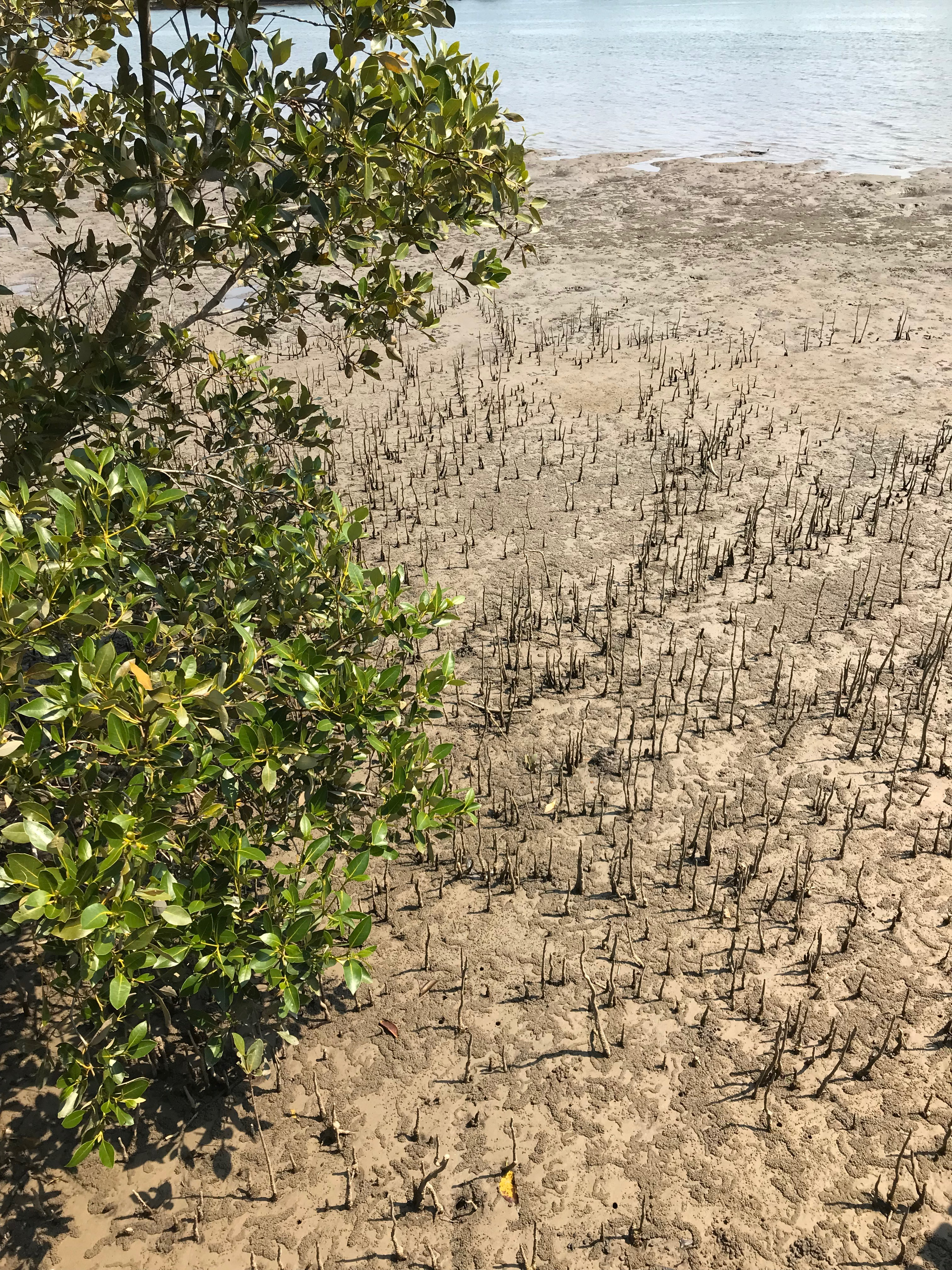
Mangroves on the Kalang River, Urunga, New South Wales.

Australia has coastal areas where mangrove thickets and swamps occur, such as in the intertidal zones of protected tropical, subtropical and some temperate coastal rivers, river deltas, estuaries, lagoons and bays. Less than 1% of Australia's total forested area consists of mangroves.

Although mangroves are typically found in warmer, subtropical to tropical tidal areas, there are occurrences as far south as Millers Landing in Wilsons Promontory, Victoria (38°54′S), Barker Inlet in Adelaide, South Australia and Leschenault Inlet (Koombana Park), near Bunbury, Western Australia.

Nearly half of Australia's mangrove forests are found in subtropical and tropical areas of coastal Queensland (44% of the continent's total), followed by the Northern Territory (37%) and Western Australia (17%).

In Western Australia, mangroves are scattered along the coast; the mangroves of the Abrolhos Islands are 300 kilometres south of the next-nearest site at Shark Bay. The mangroves at Bunbury are even further south than this (500 km). The Bunbury mangrove colonisation may have occurred relatively recently, perhaps only several thousand years ago, with propagules likely transferred by the Leeuwin Current. The most inland occurrence in Australia is a growth of grey mangrove (Avicennia marina) at Mandora Marsh, some 60 km from the coast.

== Flora ==
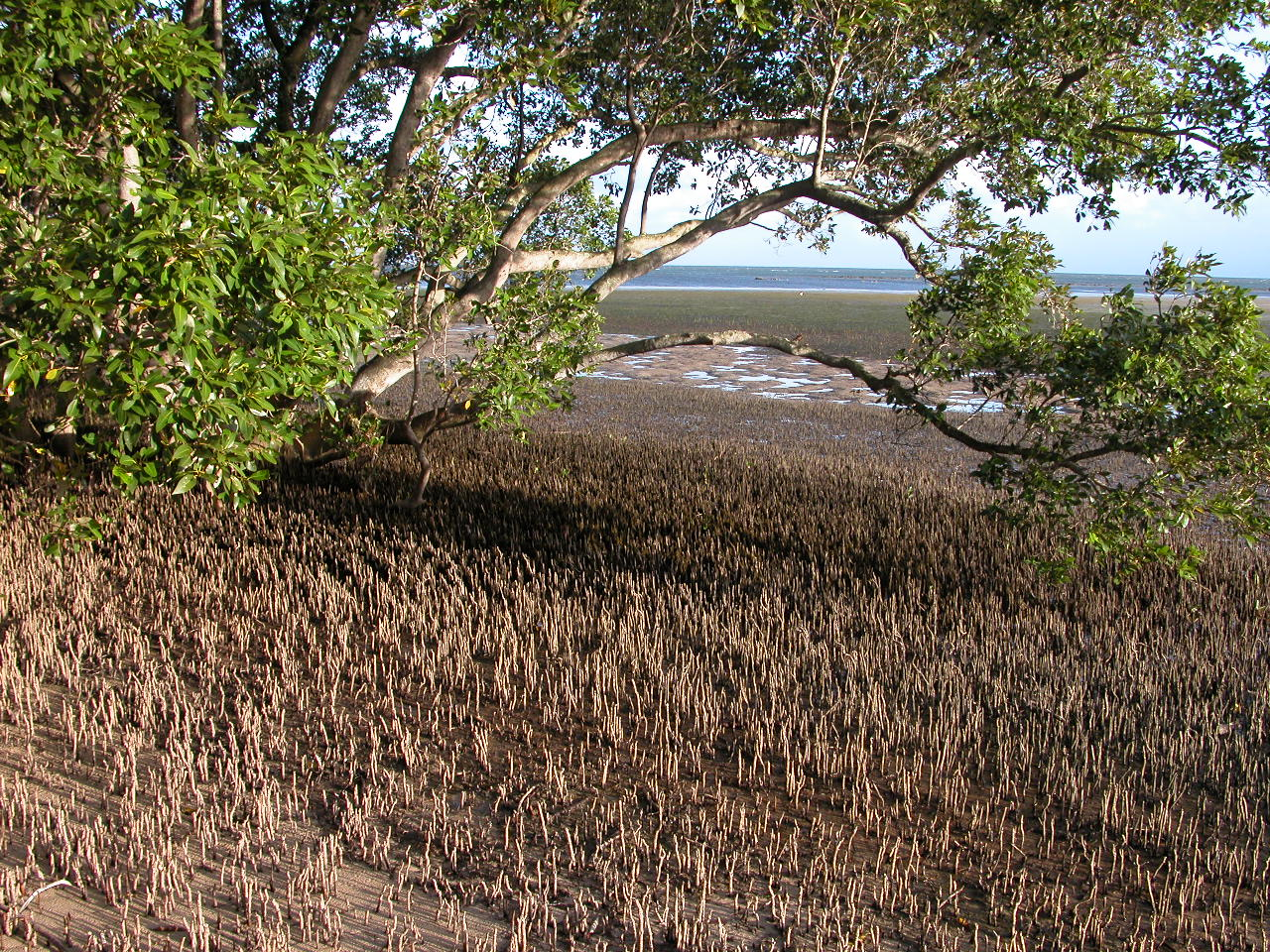
A mangrove tree surrounded by its pneumatophores, Moreton Bay, Queensland

Australian mangrove forests comprise 45 species across 18 families, which is more than half of the world's total mangrove species. One species, Avicennia integra, is found only in Australia, in the Northern Territory, east of Darwin.

Each mangrove species is specific to particular coordinates as well as to its own unique levels of tidal inundation. The greatest diversity of species is found on the far northern and north-eastern coasts of Australia, becoming sparser with increasing latitude. For example, Darwin Harbour, in the north of Australia, contains 36 mangrove tree species, while Bunbury, in the south, contains only one mangrove tree species. There are no mangroves in Tasmania.

The most widespread and common mangrove tree in Australia is the grey mangrove or white mangrove (Avicennia marina).

Mangrove forests also support several salt-tolerant plant species which are not classed as mangroves. In tropical areas, this may include the mangrove palm (Nypa fruticans), the mangrove fern (Acrostichum speciosum), and orchids which grow as epiphytes on the trunks and branches of mangrove trees. Other plants found in association with mangroves include the mangrove lily (Crinum pedunculatum).

Mangrove forests share the high intertidal zone niche with coastal or intertidal saltmarshes; plant communities dominated by salt-resistant or salt-tolerant herbs and low shrubs.

== Associated fauna ==
Mangrove forests provide breeding nurseries for a wide range of fish and crustaceans, including many species of commercial and recreational value, for example, barramundi (Lates calcarifer), mangrove jack (Lutjanus argentimaculatus), mud crabs (Scylla serrata) and banana prawn (Penaeus merguinensis). The forests also provide a habitat for spat settlement and development of oyster species.

Many terrestrial fauna, such as insects, reptiles, frogs, birds and mammals, use mangroves for food, shelter, breeding and feeding grounds.

The rusty monitor (Varanus semiremex) shelters in the hollows of mature or dead mangrove trees in north-eastern Queensland. The mangrove snake (Fordonia leucobalia) and estuarine crocodile (Crocodylus porosus) are found in mangrove forests in the north.

The lesser noddy (Anous tenuirostris melanops) builds a platform nest of leaves in mangrove trees. This bird is listed as vulnerable under Australia's Environment Protection and Biodiversity Conservation Act 1999.

Mangrove forests provide habitat for many small insectivorous birds, including the varied honeyeater, mangrove honeyeater, rufous-banded honeyeater, mangrove robin, lemon-bellied flycatcher, buff-sided robin, little shrike-thrush grey whistler, white-breasted whistler, northern fantail, mangrove grey fantail, Arafura fantail, broad-billed flycatcher, shining flycatcher, spectacled monarch, white-eared monarch and yellow white-eye. Other bird species observed to frequent mangrove forests are the rose-crowned fruit-dove, little bronze-cuckoo, Papuan frogmouth, azure kingfisher, little kingfisher, forest kingfisher, Torresian kingfisher, sacred kingfisher and fawn-breasted bowerbird.

Mangrove forests are sometimes used as nursery areas by flying foxes in the Darwin Harbour and other areas of Australia. Several species, including the little red flying fox, are dependent on mangrove pollen as food.

== Economic values ==
Mangroves protect coastal areas from erosion, storm surge, and tsunamis. The massive root systems of mangroves are efficient at dissipating wave energy. Mangroves retard the tidal movement of water, allowing sediment to be deposited as the tide comes in, and leaving all except fine particles when the tide ebbs. Mangroves therefore build their own environment.

The commercial and recreational fishing industries are prime beneficiaries of mangrove forests, which provide breeding and feeding grounds for fish and prawns. About 75% of the fish and prawns caught for commercial and recreational purposes in Queensland spend at least part of their lifecycles in mangroves.

In some coastal communities, boardwalks and bird-viewing areas in mangrove forests provide attractions for the eco-tourism industry, for example, at Boondall Wetlands.

== Threats ==
Threats to mangrove ecosystems include;

- coastal modifications such as reclaiming land (e.g. for building canal estates and marinas);
- erosion of shorelines in coastal lakes and estuaries;
- elevated levels of nutrients and sediments from land clearing, overgrazing and cropping;
- increased levels of heavy metals such as copper, lead, cadmium, zinc and mercury, and tributyl tin (TBT) from anti-fouling paints;
- marine oil pollution from sewage systems and drains, which is estimated at 16,000 tonnes a year over the whole of Australia;
- accidental spills during re-fuelling of vessels in ports.

Removal of mangrove forests can lead to erosion of the shoreline, exposure of acid sulphate soils, shallowing of estuaries and waterways, and a reduction in water quality. These threats can deplete the populations of fish, prawns, crabs and other sea life that use mangroves as breeding and feeding grounds, which would then impact on commercial and recreational fishing.

== Protection and preservation ==
About one-third of the total area of Australian mangrove forest is privately owned, including indigenous reserves, with around 18% of the total mangrove areas located within national parks or other officially protected areas.

Mangroves are protected in Queensland under the Fisheries Act 1994, and in Western Australia under the Wildlife Conservation Act 1950.

As the benefits of mangroves become more widely known and valued, grassroots efforts to protect them are becoming more frequent. Boardwalks provide visual opportunities for visitors to experience the habitat, further educating the public on the ecological, economic and environmental necessities of mangroves.

== See also ==
- Changes in global mangrove distributions
- Ecological values of mangroves
