= Hatchling =

Newly hatched fish, amphibian, reptile, or bird

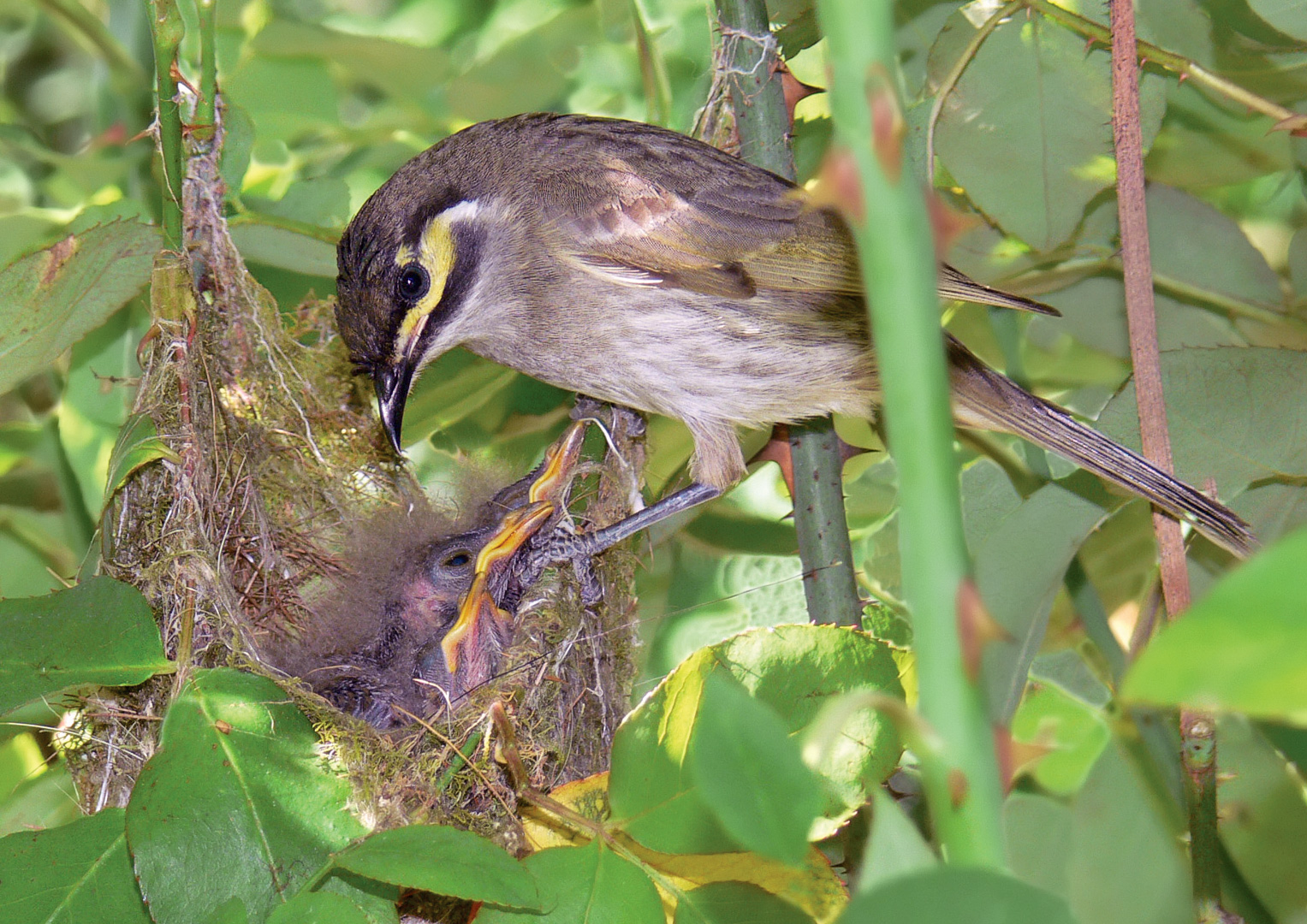
Yellow-faced honeyeater chicks

In oviparous biology, a hatchling is a newly hatched fish, amphibian, reptile, or bird. A group of mammals called monotremes lay eggs, and their young are hatchlings as well.

== Fish ==
Fish hatchlings generally do not receive parental care, similar to reptiles. Like reptiles, fish hatchlings can be affected by xenobiotic compounds. For example, exposure to xenoestrogens can feminize fish. As well, hatchlings raised in water with high levels of carbon dioxide demonstrate unusual behaviour, such as being attracted to the scent of predators. This change could be reversed by immersion into gabazine water, leading to the hypothesis that acidic waters affect hatchling brain chemistry.

== Amphibians ==
The behavior of an amphibian hatchling, commonly referred to as a tadpole, is controlled by a few thousand neurons. 99% of a Xenopus hatchling's first day after hatching is spent hanging from a thread of mucus secreted from near its mouth will eventually form; if it becomes detached from this thread, it will swim back and become reattached, usually within ten seconds. While newt hatchlings are only able to swim for a few seconds, Xenopus tadpoles may be able to swim for minutes as long as they do not bump into anything. The tadpole live from remaining yolk-mass in the gut for a period, before it swims off to find food.

== Reptiles ==
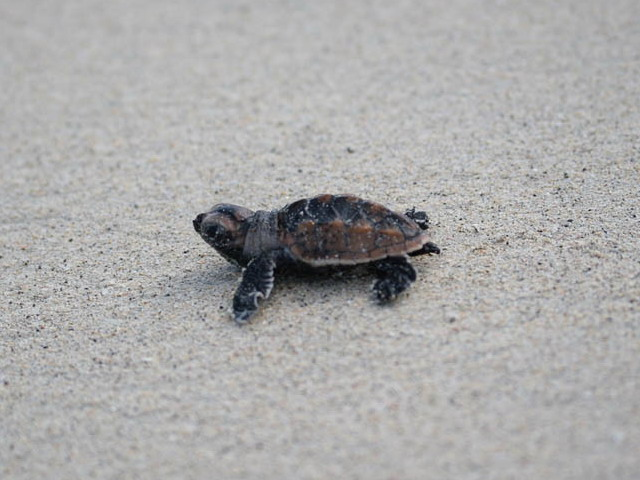
A hawksbill turtle hatchling

The reptile hatchling is quite the opposite of an altricial bird hatchling. Most hatchling reptiles are born with the same instincts as their parents and leave to live on their own immediately after leaving the egg. When first hatched, hatchlings can be several times smaller than their adult forms: Pine Snakes weigh 30 grams when they first hatch, but can grow up to 1,400 grams as adults. This appears to have been the case even in dinosaurs. In sea turtles, hatchling sex is determined by incubation temperature. In species in which eggs are laid then buried in sand, indentations in the sand can be a clue to imminent hatching. In sea turtles, this usually occurs about 60 days after the laying of eggs, and often at night. However, exposure to xenobiotic compounds, especially endocrine-disrupting compounds, can affect hatchling sex ratios as well. Persistent Organic Pollutants (POPs) and other pollutants like octylphenol are also known to increase the rate of hatchling mortality and deformity. Upon hatching, animals such as turtles have innate navigational skills, including compass and beacon methods of navigation, to reach safety. For example, turtle hatchlings instinctively swim against waves to ensure they leave the beach and its predators. They also head towards the brightest part of the horizon in order to reach the water: however, human activity has created sources of light which mislead the turtle hatchlings, causing them to not travel directly to the water, making them vulnerable to dehydration and predation. Hatchlings of the species Iguana iguana also gain gut flora essential to digestion from adults as part of their development. In the wild, hatchling survival rates are extremely low due to factors such as predation, for example, by crabs, as well as due to human-made obstacles. Human intervention has also benefited hatchling reptiles at times. For example, late-hatched loggerhead turtles are taken in by such groups as the University of Georgia to be raised.

=== Crocodilians ===
The sex of crocodilian hatchlings is temperature dependant; constant nest temperatures above 32 °C (90 °F) produce more males, while those below 31 °C (88 °F) produce more females. Sex in crocodilians may be established in a short period of time, and nests are subject to changes in temperature. Most natural nests produce hatchlings of both sexes, though single-sex clutches occur. Baby crocodiles have an egg-tooth at the tip of their snouts, a tough piece of skin that helps them tear open the inner egg membrane, the baby crocodile can then push its way through the outer shell.

Crocodilians are unusual among reptiles in the amount of parental care provided after the young hatch. At the time of hatching, the young start calling within the eggs. Hearing the calls, the mother helps excavate them from the nest and carries them to water in her mouth. If conditions are particularly dry that year, which can make the inner egg membrane too tough for the hatchlings to break through, the mother may take the unhatched eggs in her mouth and help free them. The hatchlings are usually carried to the water in the mouth. She would then introduce them to the water and even feed them. Both male and female adult crocodilians will respond to vocalizations by hatchlings. In the absence of the mother, the father would act in her place to take care of the young. The time it takes for young crocodilians to reach independence can vary. For American alligators, groups of young associate with adults for one-to-two years while juvenile saltwater and Nile crocodiles become independent in a few months. However, even with sophisticated parental nurturing, young crocodilians still have a high mortality rate due to their vulnerability to predation.

=== As pets ===
Reptile hatchlings, especially those of turtles, are often sold as pets. This has been reported to occur even in places where such practices are illegal.

== Birds ==
Bird hatchlings may be altricial or precocial. Altricial means that the young hatch naked and with their eyes closed, and rely totally on their parents for feeding and warmth. Precocial hatching are feathered when hatched, and can leave the nest immediately. In birds, such as the bobwhite quail, hatchlings' auditory systems are more developed than their visual system, as visual stimulation is not present in the egg, while auditory stimulation can reach the embryo even before birth. It has also been shown that auditory development in hatchlings is disrupted by environments high in visual and social stimulation. Many hatchlings are born with some forms of innate behaviours which allow them to improve their ability to survive: for example, hatchling gulls instinctively peck at long objects with marked colour contrast, which leads them to peck at their parents' bills, eliciting a feeding response. Endocrine disruption of hatchling birds increases the rate of deformities and lowers the chances of survival. In bearded vultures, two eggs are laid, but one hatchling will often kill the other. Bird hatchlings raised by humans have sometimes been noted to act towards their human caregivers as their parents.
