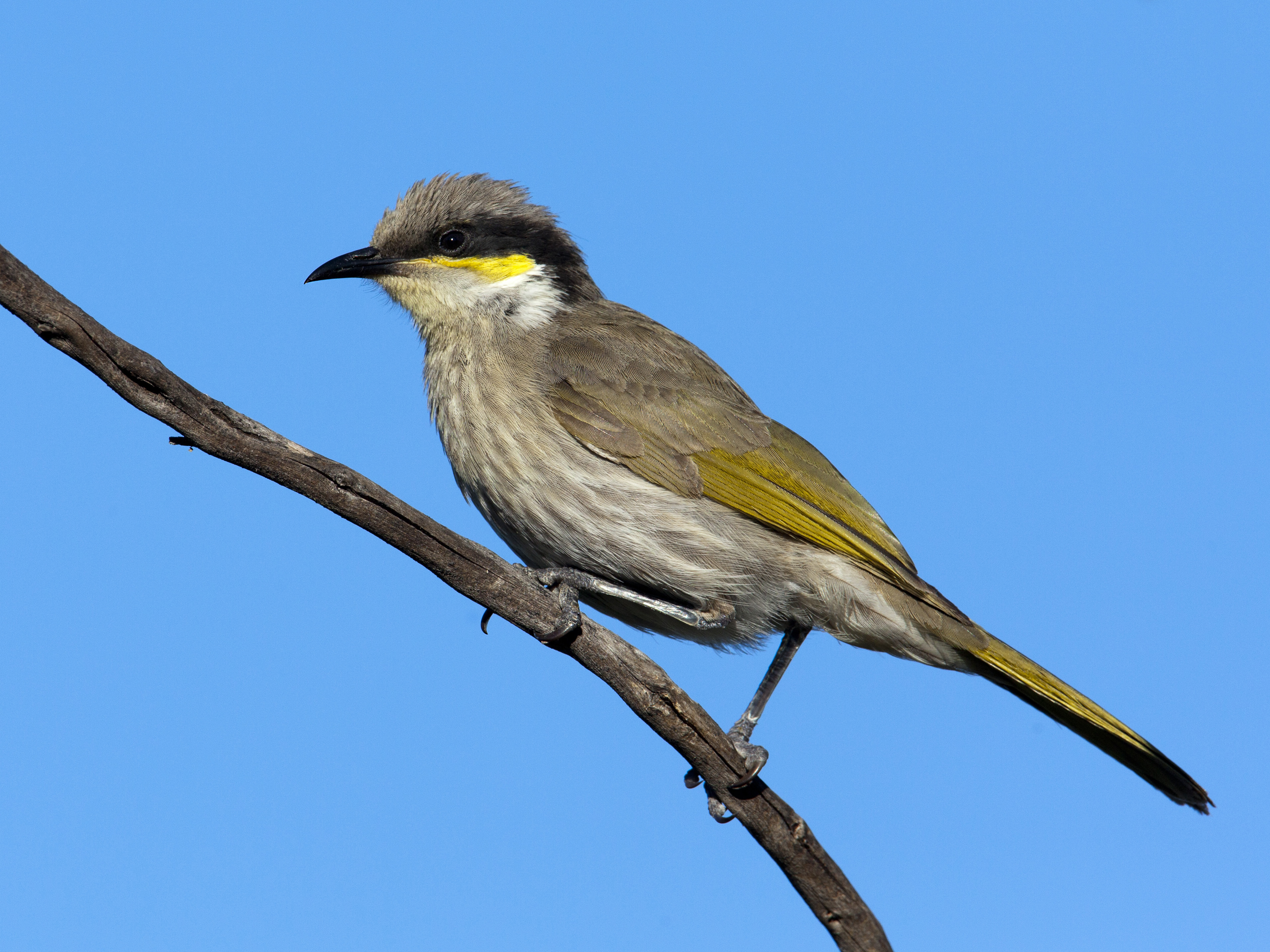
- Gavicalis virescens (singing honeyeater)

Scientific classification
- Kingdom: Animalia
- Phylum: Chordata
- Class: Aves
- Order: Passeriformes
- Family: Meliphagidae
- Genus: Gavicalis; Schodde & Mason, IJ, 1999

Type species
- Melithreptus virescens Vieillot, 1817

= Gavicalis =

Genus of birds

Gavicalis is a genus of honeyeaters endemic to New Guinea and Australia. It contains former members of Lichenostomus, and was created after a molecular phylogenetic analysis published in 2011 showed that the original genus was polyphyletic.

The genus contains three species:

Image	Scientific name	Common name	Distribution
	Gavicalis versicolor	Varied honeyeater	New Guinea, northeast Australia
	Gavicalis fasciogularis	Mangrove honeyeater	east Australia
	Gavicalis virescens	Singing honeyeater	Australia

The name Gavicalis was first proposed by the Australian ornithologists Richard Schodde and Ian Mason in 1999. The word is an anagram of Caligavis introduced by Tom Iredale.
