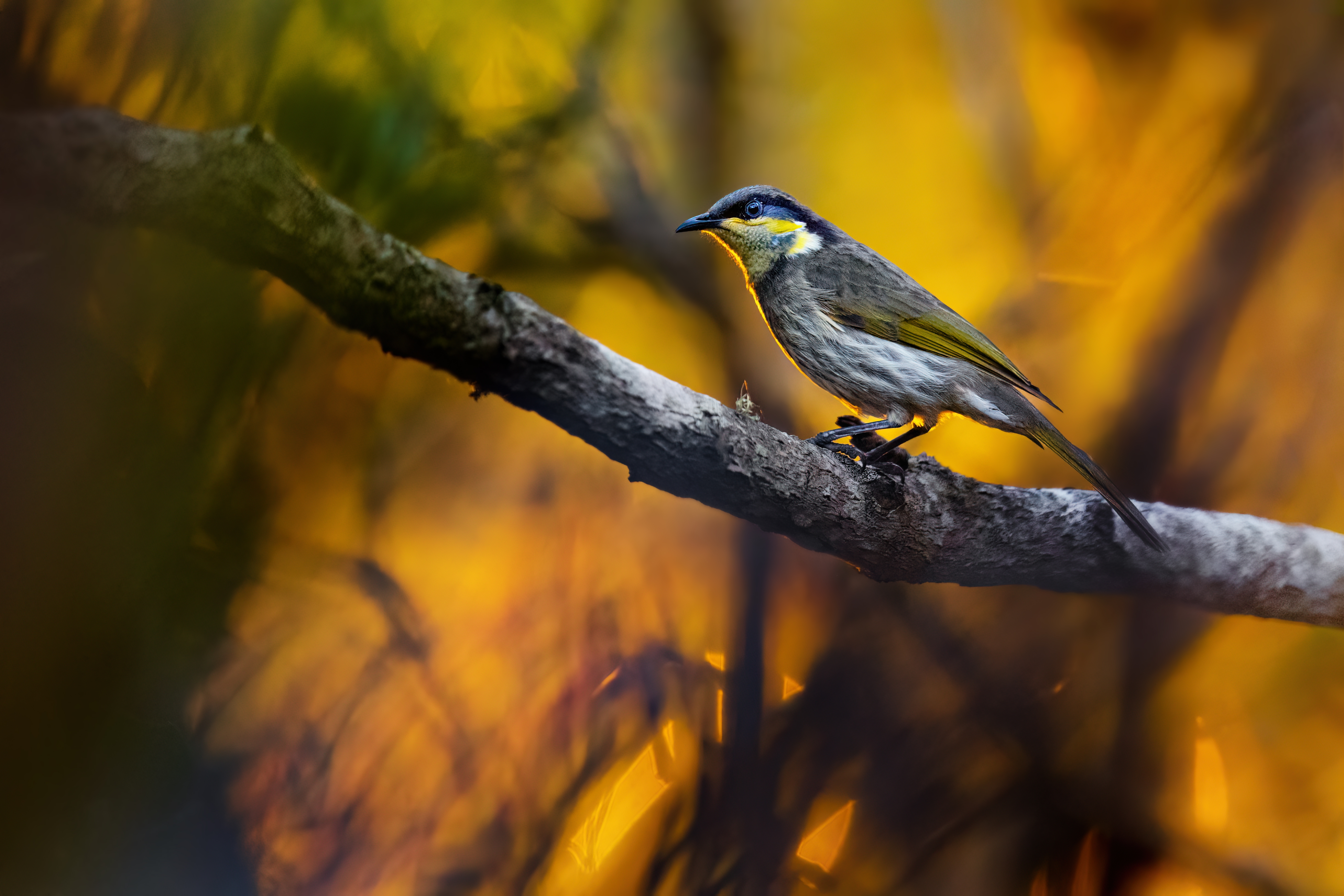

Conservation status
- Least Concern (IUCN 3.1)

Scientific classification
- Kingdom: Animalia
- Phylum: Chordata
- Class: Aves
- Order: Passeriformes
- Family: Meliphagidae
- Genus: Gavicalis
- Species: G. fasciogularis

Binomial name
- Gavicalis fasciogularis (Gould, 1854)

Synonyms
- Lichenostomus fasciogularis

= Mangrove honeyeater =

Species of bird

The mangrove honeyeater (Gavicalis fasciogularis) is a species of bird in the honeyeater family Meliphagidae. The species was once considered to be conspecific with the varied honeyeater, but it is now treated as a separate species. These two species form a genus with the singing honeyeater.

It is endemic to Australia, where it is restricted to the eastern coast from Townsville in Queensland to northern New South Wales. The species has been expanding its range southward in recent years. The mangrove honeyeater is generally locally common over most of its range, but is rarer in the south.

There are 177 species of honeyeaters in 40 genera, including the Blue-faced honeyeater (Entomyzon cyanotis), Bell miner (Manorina melanophrys), Stitchbird (Notiomystis cincta), Western spinebill (Acanthorhynchus superciliosus), and the Wattlebirds of the genus Anthochaera.

== Physical description ==
Mangrove Honeyeaters are small to medium-sized nectar eating birds. Its plumage is olive-brown above, grading to greyish-brown on rump and uppertail-coverts, with fine dark streaking on top of head and hindneck. There is olive mottling on uppertail-coverts and broad black mask extending well down side of neck. A narrow yellow moustachial stripe exists that ends in small white tuft. It meets large greyish-white patch on lower side of neck and the tail and upperwing are olive-brown in color. The chin and throat are finely barred dark grey-brown and dull yellow in color. Its legs are colored in dark grey or bluish-grey. The back is dark-grey; only the flight feathers have yellowish-olive leading edges. The irises are dark blue-grey. The slightly down-curved bill is dark-grey. Male weighs between 23.9g to 33.1g and the female weighs between 22g to 30g.

== Genus ==
The mangrove honeyeater was previously placed in the genus Lichenostomus, but was moved to Gavicalis after a molecular phylogenetic analysis, published in 2011, showed that the original genus was polyphyletic.

== Distribution and habitat. ==
Mangrove honeyeaters are found in Coastal Australia from Northeast Queensland near Townsville as well as in islands from Whitsunday Islands, Moreton Bay, and Northeast New South Wales. They are found mainly in Mangrove forests and woodlands fringing coasts, bays, estuaries and islands. They are less likely to be found in coastal shrubland, woodland or scrub (e.g. of Eucalyptus, Banksia, Melaleuca or combinations of these) near mangroves. The mangrove honeyeaters are a regular visitor to parks and gardens in some towns near mangroves.

In Australia three species are largely restricted to mangroves. It is not uncommon to find ten or more species at a location in forests and coastal heathlands. Woodlands, mallee, and other semi-arid scrubs are also rich in species. Within forests and woodlands, most species occupy the canopy, with some of the more nectarivorous species feeding more in the shrub layer.

== Reproduction ==
Mangrove honeyeaters are monogamous, although polygamy or a mixed mating system is present in species with great sexual dimorphism. Honeyeaters lay 1–5 eggs (average 2). The eggs are white, pinkish colored, or buff with reddish-brown spots. Their incubation period is 12–17 days, while their nesting period lasts for 10–30 days.

== Diet and foraging ==
Mangrove honeyeaters usually feed on nectar and invertebrates, and sometimes fruit. The invertebrates they eat include insects, marine snails, and crab. Honeyeaters forage mainly in mangroves (Aegiceras, Rhizophora), among outer foliage, in flowers, trees, and shrubs. Other sweet food sources include honeydew from bugs (Hemiptera), manna (sugary exudate from damaged foliage), and lerp (the sugary coating on scale insects of the family Psyllidae). Honeyeaters also consume sap exuding from scars on branches caused by gliding possums.

== Behavior ==
=== Sounds ===
The song is loud, melodious and ringing, but varying, e.g. "whit-u-we-u". It is classified as scolding chatter. Small honeyeaters are often musical, while larger ones make a larger raucous sound.

=== Breeding ===
The breeding period is between August–December. The peak month is September. In northern regions, the breeding period lasts between April–May. Their nests are cup-shaped and are made of dried grasses and seagrass or plant fibre, which are bound with spider web and matted egg sacs. They are lined with fine rootlets or fine grass. For two nests, the external diameter is 8·9–9·5 cm, the depth is 5·7–7·6 cm, and the internal diameter is 6·4–7·6 cm. Nests are suspended by rim, and occasionally supported, they are 0·5–2·7 m above ground. They are small in size, and are found in dense mangroves. Both adults feed nestlings and fledglings. Nests are parasitized by Pallid (Heteroscenes pallidus) and Fan-tailed Cuckoos (Cacomantis flabelliformis).

=== Movement ===
They are a local resident of Moreton Bay, in SE Queensland. The numbers increase in May–Jun and decline during Jul–Dec. This movement is a possible result of local seasonal changes.

=== Flight ===
The mangrove honeyeaters have benefited from land-clearing and fragmentation in southern Western Australia and are able to fly over open agricultural lands. They have been implicated in the spread of the noxious weed Bridal Creeper, Asparagus medeoloides.

== Conservation status ==
The mangrove honeyeater is not globally threatened. They have restricted range and the population size is not quantified, but is not considered vulnerable due to the size of its range. The range is thought to have expanded over the last 50 years, with first records if the bird at Yamba in 1947, and some following records farther south.
