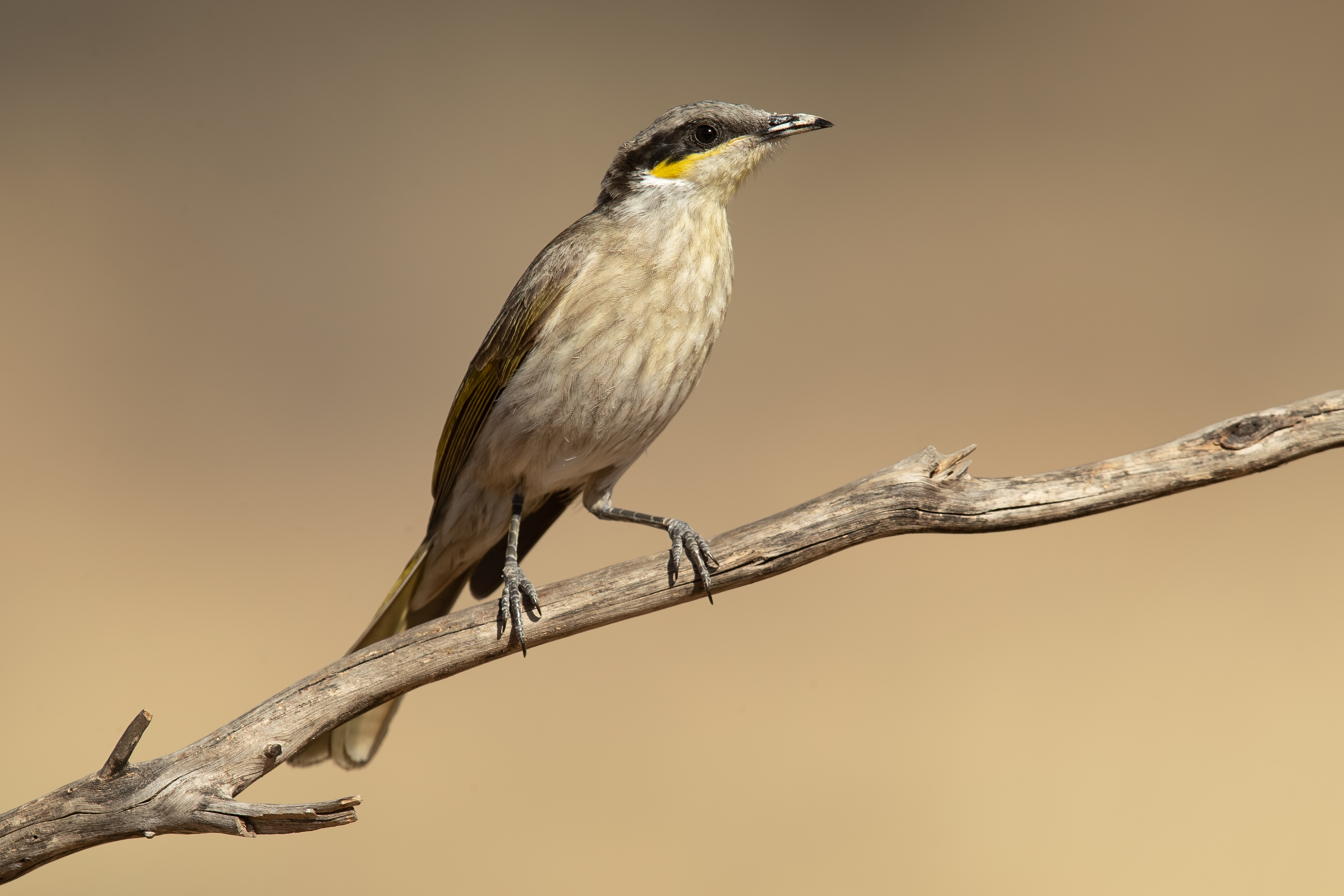

Conservation status
- Least Concern (IUCN 3.1)

Scientific classification
- Kingdom: Animalia
- Phylum: Chordata
- Class: Aves
- Order: Passeriformes
- Family: Meliphagidae
- Genus: Gavicalis
- Species: G. virescens

Binomial name
- Gavicalis virescens (Vieillot, 1817)
- Singing honeyeater's natural range

Synonyms
- Lichenostomus virescens

= Singing honeyeater =

Species of bird

The singing honeyeater (Gavicalis virescens) is a small bird found in Australia, and is part of the honeyeater family Meliphagidae. The bird lives in a wide range of shrubland, woodland, and coastal habitat. It is relatively common and is widespread right across Australia west of the Great Dividing Range, through to the west coast and on Western Australian coastal islands. It does not occur in other countries.

== Taxonomy ==
The singing honeyeater was originally described as Meliphaga virescens lipferti. It was previously placed in the genus Lichenostomus, but was moved to Gavicalis after a molecular phylogenetic analysis, published in 2011, showed that the original genus was polyphyletic. The generic name is formed from an anagram of the sister genus Caligavis; the specific epithet is the Latin virescens meaning 'greenish'.

== Description ==
Singing honeyeaters can vary in length from 17–22 cm (6.7–8.7 in). Their overall appearance is grey-brown. The tail and wings are olive-green with flashes of yellow. There is a broad, black stripe running from the behind the beak to the back, and a yellow streak immediately below this from the eye. The bird's song ranges from scratchy to melodious. The song also varies according to where they live. The singing honeyeater has close relatives that have a similar general appearance, or some details in common, with overlapping ranges and similar voices, so a bird identification guide with clear visuals may be essential to attain the correct identity.

== Ecology ==
Singing honeyeaters eat a variety of foods, including nectar, small insects, fruits, grubs, and berries. They are also opportunistic nest predators of smaller birds, including the zebra finch; any nest with eggs or chicks left unattended will be, potentially, an easy food source. This makes them omnivorous birds.

Singing honeyeaters breed between July and February. They are capable of forming longtime relationships with partners. When they are breeding, they show aggressive actions. Their nest is a cup of grass, plant stems, and spider webs. The eggs are a light cream-brown with some darker spots. The incubation period is 14 days, and birds have 2-3 eggs at a time.

Singing honeyeaters live in families. They will attack larger animals, if they feel threatened by them, or if they enter their territory. They have been known to attack intruders in mobs, thus showing they are a community-minded bird that will work together for a common cause.

They associate with other species of birds, such as the brown honeyeater and the red wattlebird. They are different from many birds, however, because they lack the ability to communicate with isolated birds of the same species. As a study by M.C. Baker (1996) showed, the birds of the mainland did not respond to the songs of singing honeyeaters found on Rottnest Island, an island off Australia's west coast. The study showed that the songs of the birds on the island were shorter, had less song and syllable types, and had fewer syllables and notes per song.

== Gallery ==
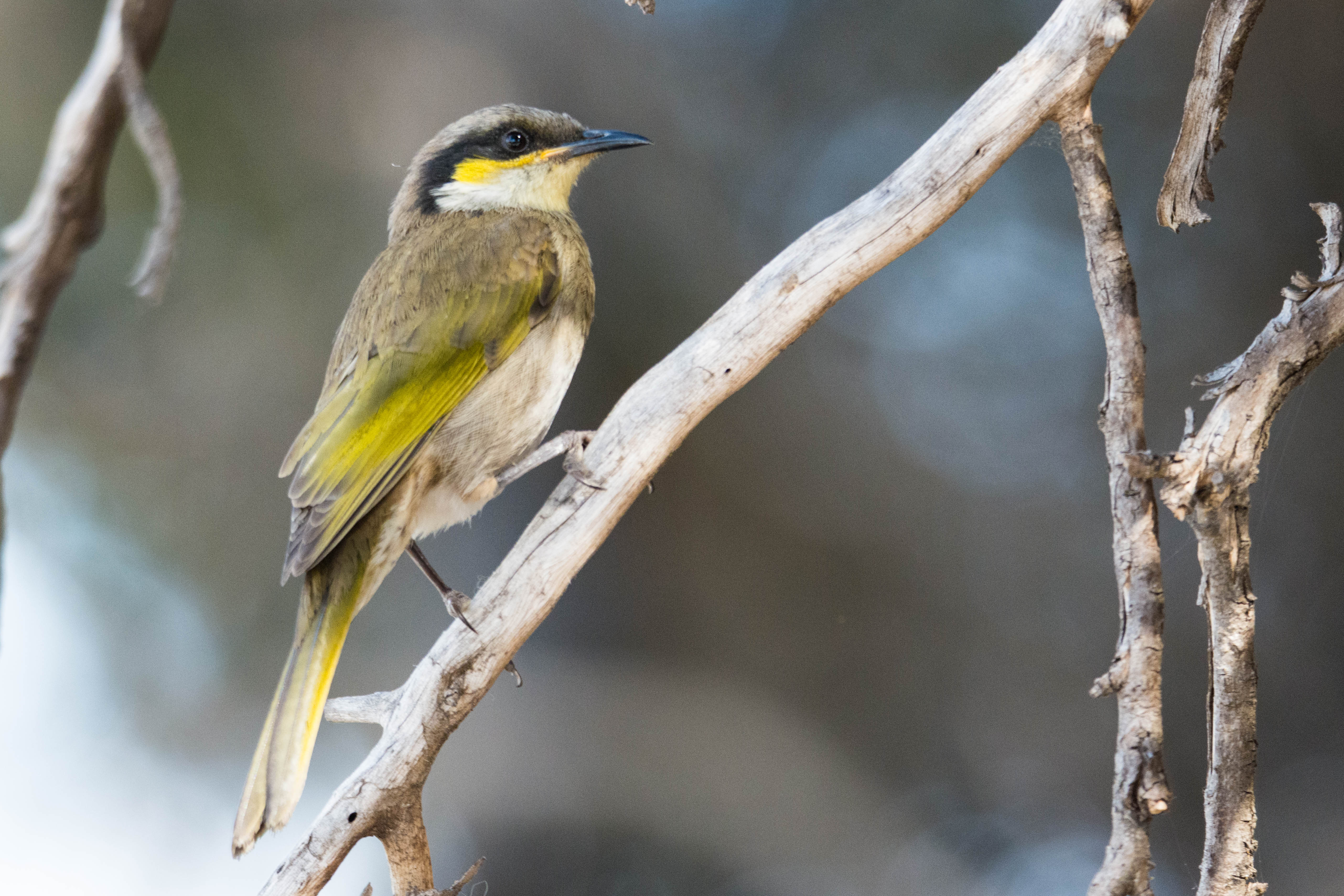
Singing honeyeater, Rottnest Island, Western Australia

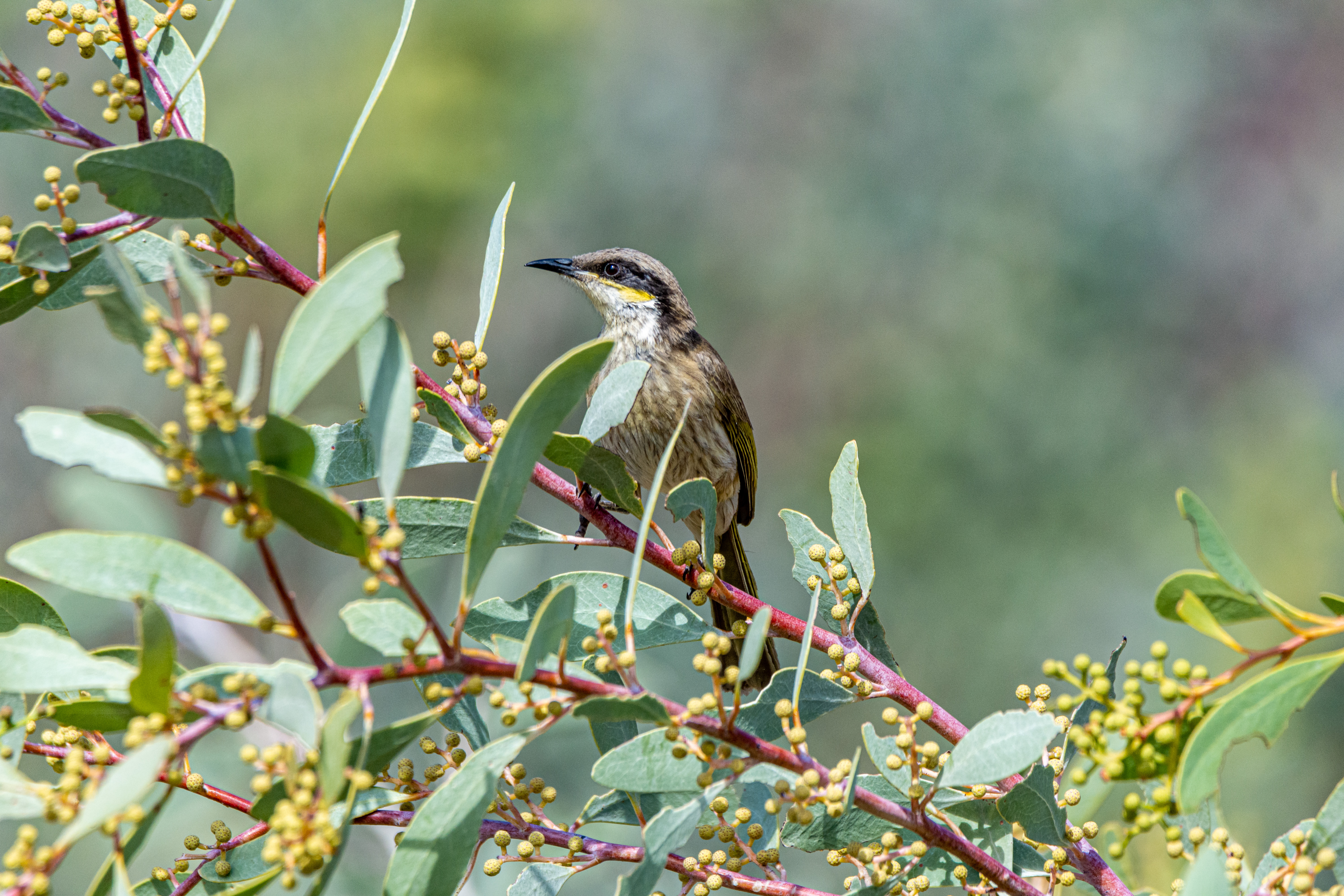
Singing honeyeater, Alice Springs Desert Park, Northern Territory
