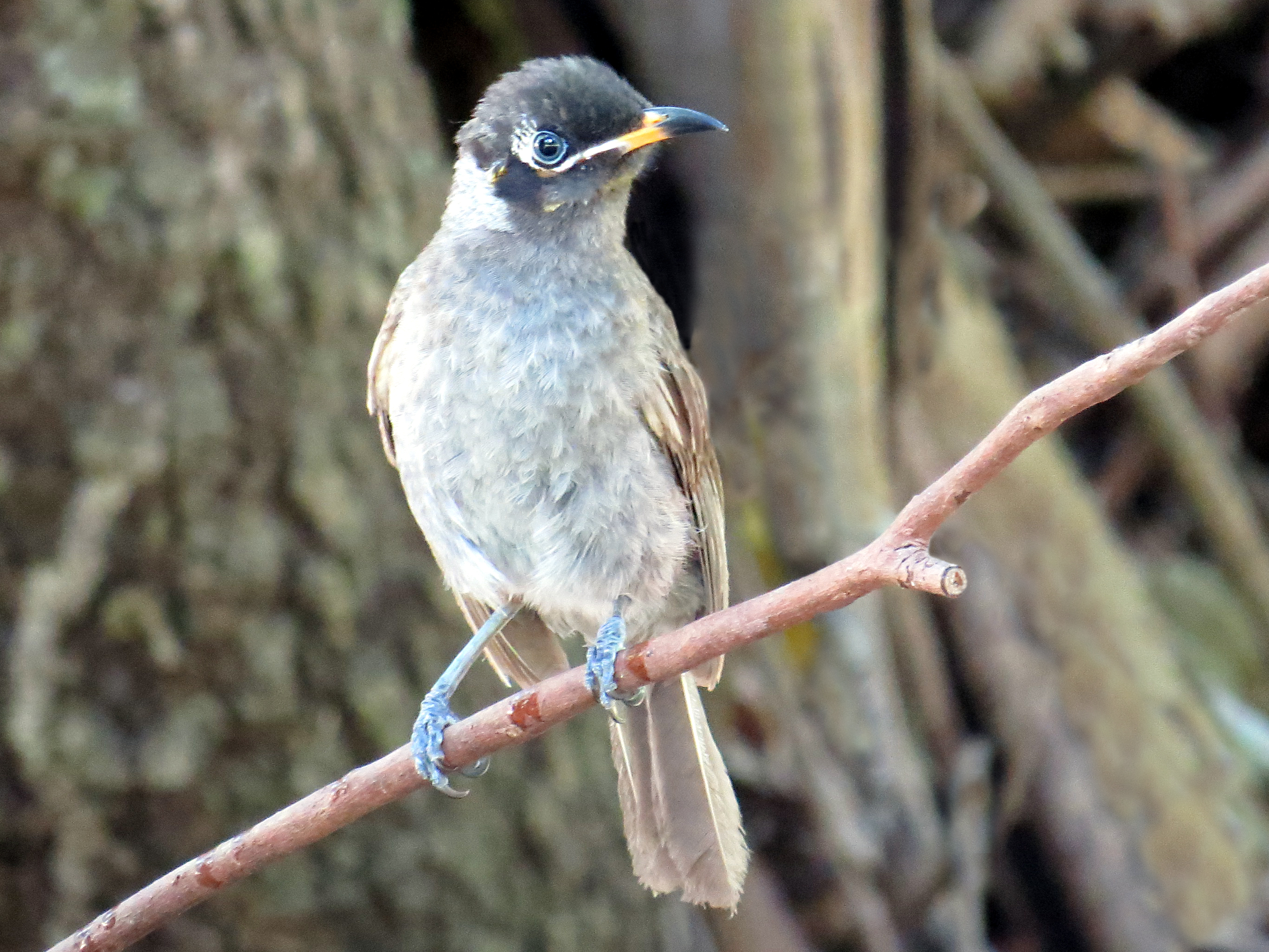
- Bolemoreus frenatus (bridled honeyeater)

Scientific classification
- Kingdom: Animalia
- Phylum: Chordata
- Class: Aves
- Order: Passeriformes
- Family: Meliphagidae
- Genus: Bolemoreus; Nyári & Joseph, 2011

Type species
- Ptilotis frenata Ramsay, 1875

= Bolemoreus =

Genus of birds

Bolemoreus is a genus of honeyeaters endemic to Australia. It contains former members of Lichenostomus, and was created after a molecular phylogenetic analysis published in 2011 showed that the original genus was polyphyletic.

The genus contains two species:

Image	Scientific name	Common name	Distribution
	Bolemoreus hindwoodi	Eungella honeyeater	northeast Australia
	Bolemoreus frenatus	Bridled honeyeater	northeast Australia

The name Bolemoreus was first proposed by Árpád Nyári and Leo Joseph in 2011. The word combines the names of the Australian ornithologists Walter E. Boles and N. Wayne Longmore.
