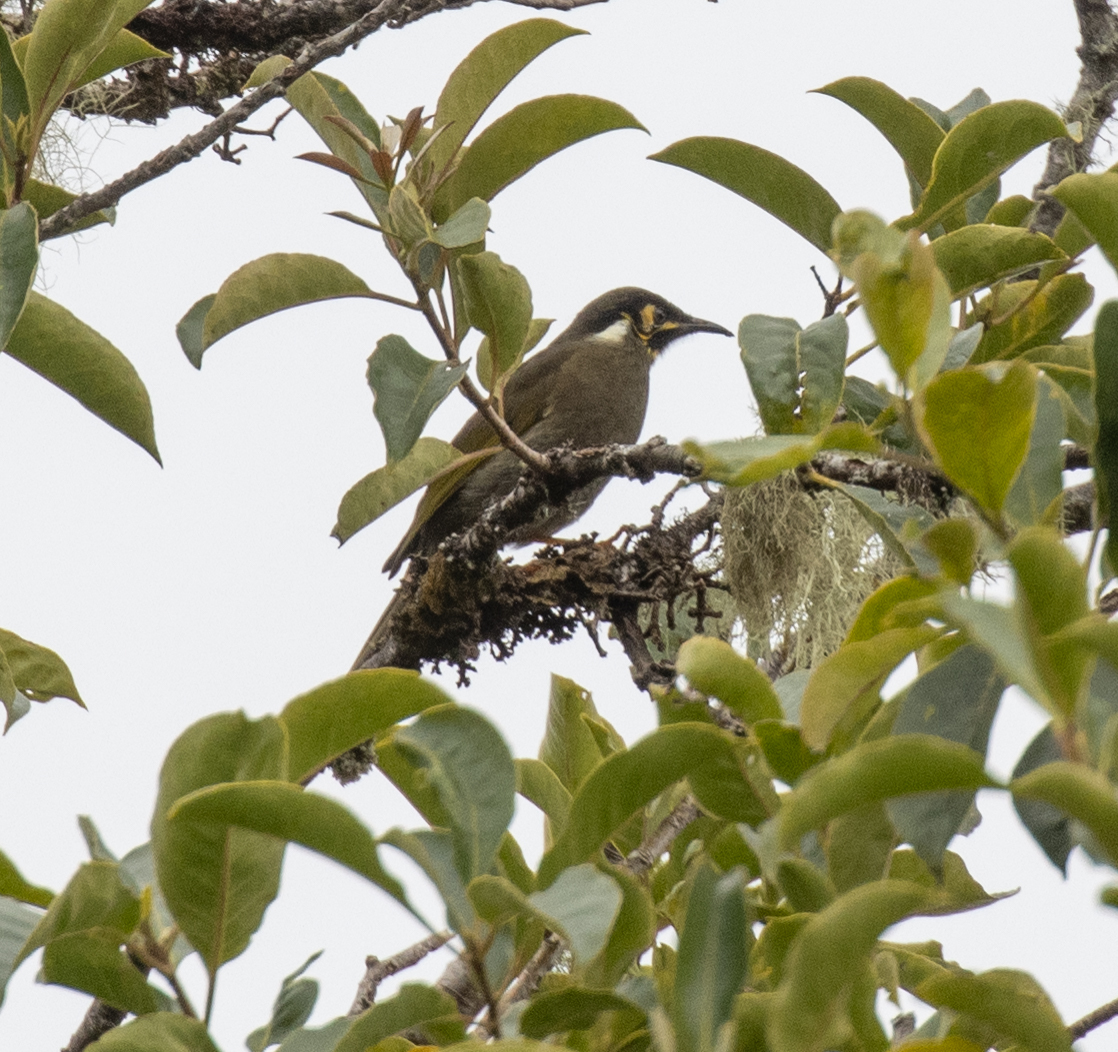

Conservation status
- Least Concern (IUCN 3.1)

Scientific classification
- Kingdom: Animalia
- Phylum: Chordata
- Class: Aves
- Order: Passeriformes
- Family: Meliphagidae
- Genus: Caligavis
- Species: C. subfrenata

Binomial name
- Caligavis subfrenata (Salvadori, 1876)

Synonyms
- Lichenostomus subfrenatus Salvadori, 1876

= Black-throated honeyeater =

Species of bird

The black-throated honeyeater (Caligavis subfrenata) is a species of bird in the family Meliphagidae. It is found in New Guinea. Its natural habitat is subtropical or tropical moist montane forest.

The black-throated honeyeater was originally described in 1876 as Lichenostomus subfrenatus, but was moved to Caligavis after a molecular phylogenetic analysis published in 2011 showed that Lichenostomus was polyphyletic.
