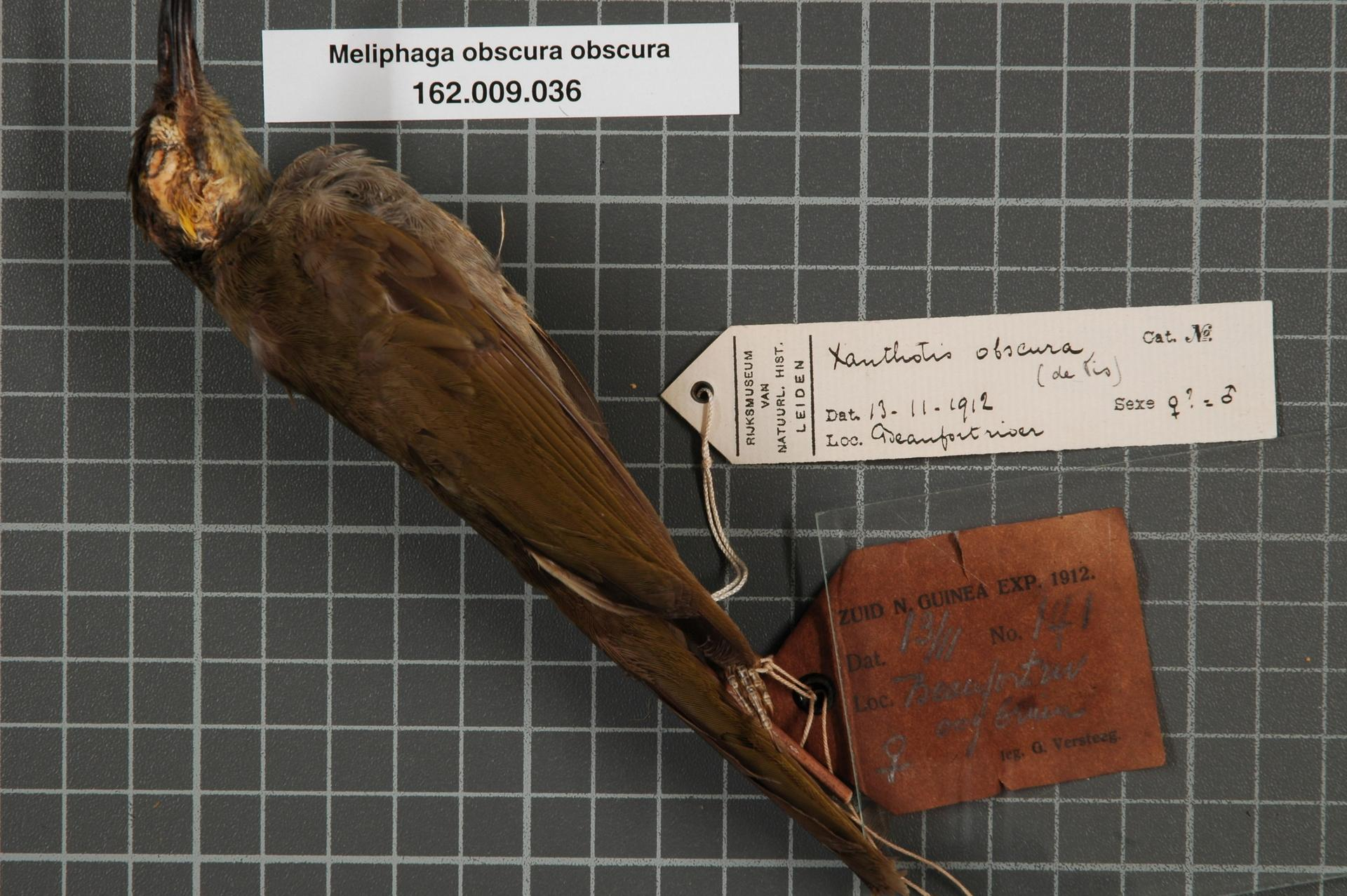

Conservation status
- Least Concern (IUCN 3.1)

Scientific classification
- Kingdom: Animalia
- Phylum: Chordata
- Class: Aves
- Order: Passeriformes
- Family: Meliphagidae
- Genus: Caligavis
- Species: C. obscura

Binomial name
- Caligavis obscura (De Vis, 1897)

Synonyms
- Lichenostomus obscurus

= Obscure honeyeater =

Species of bird

The obscure honeyeater (Caligavis obscura) is a species of bird in the family Meliphagidae. It is found in New Guinea.

Its natural habitats are subtropical or tropical moist lowland forests and subtropical or tropical moist montane forests.

The obscure honeyeater was previously placed in the genus Lichenostomus but was moved to Caligavis after a molecular phylogenetic analysis published in 2011 showed that the original genus was polyphyletic.
