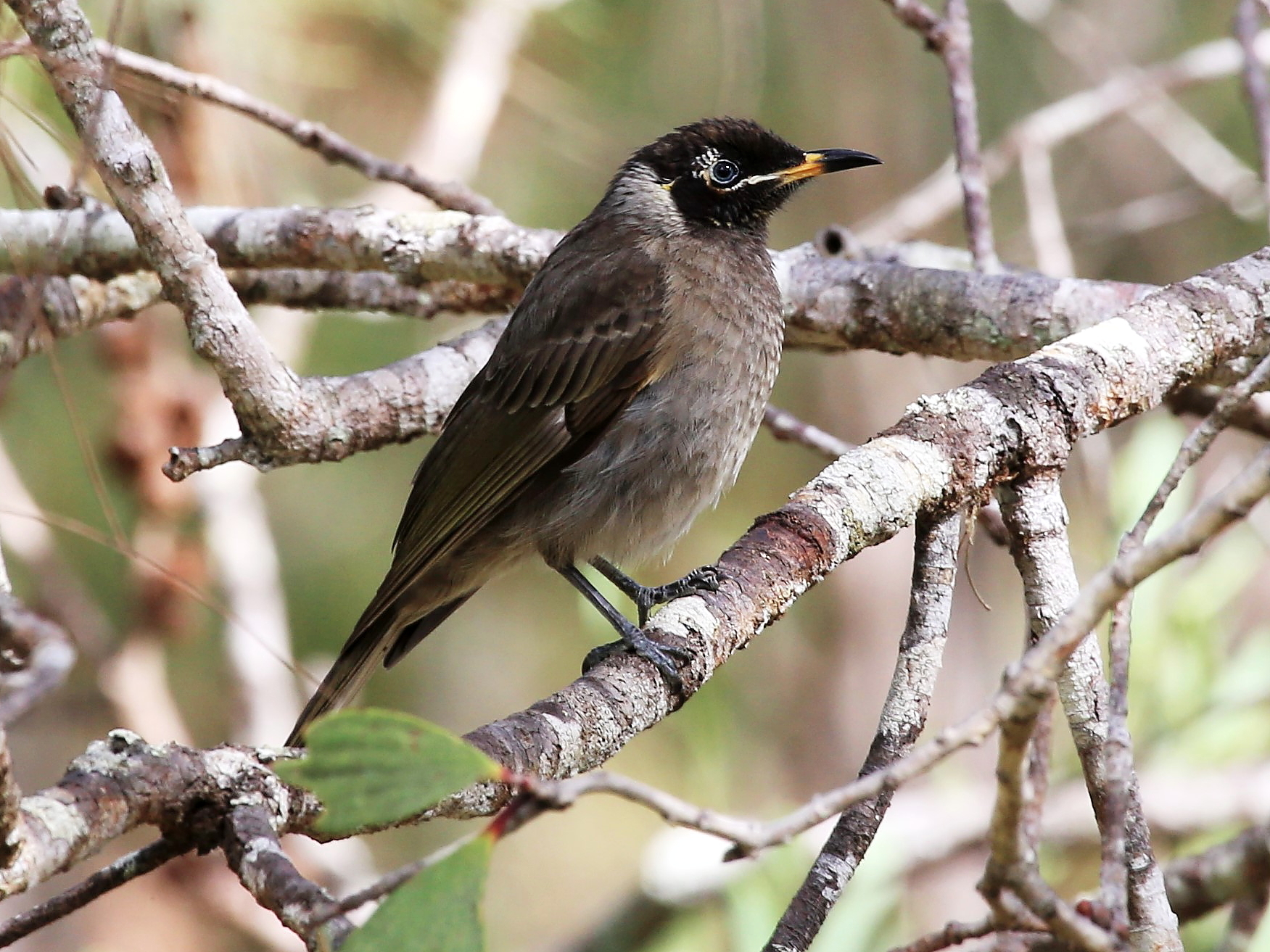

Conservation status
- Least Concern (IUCN 3.1)

Scientific classification
- Kingdom: Animalia
- Phylum: Chordata
- Class: Aves
- Order: Passeriformes
- Family: Meliphagidae
- Genus: Bolemoreus
- Species: B. frenatus

Binomial name
- Bolemoreus frenatus (Ramsay, 1874)
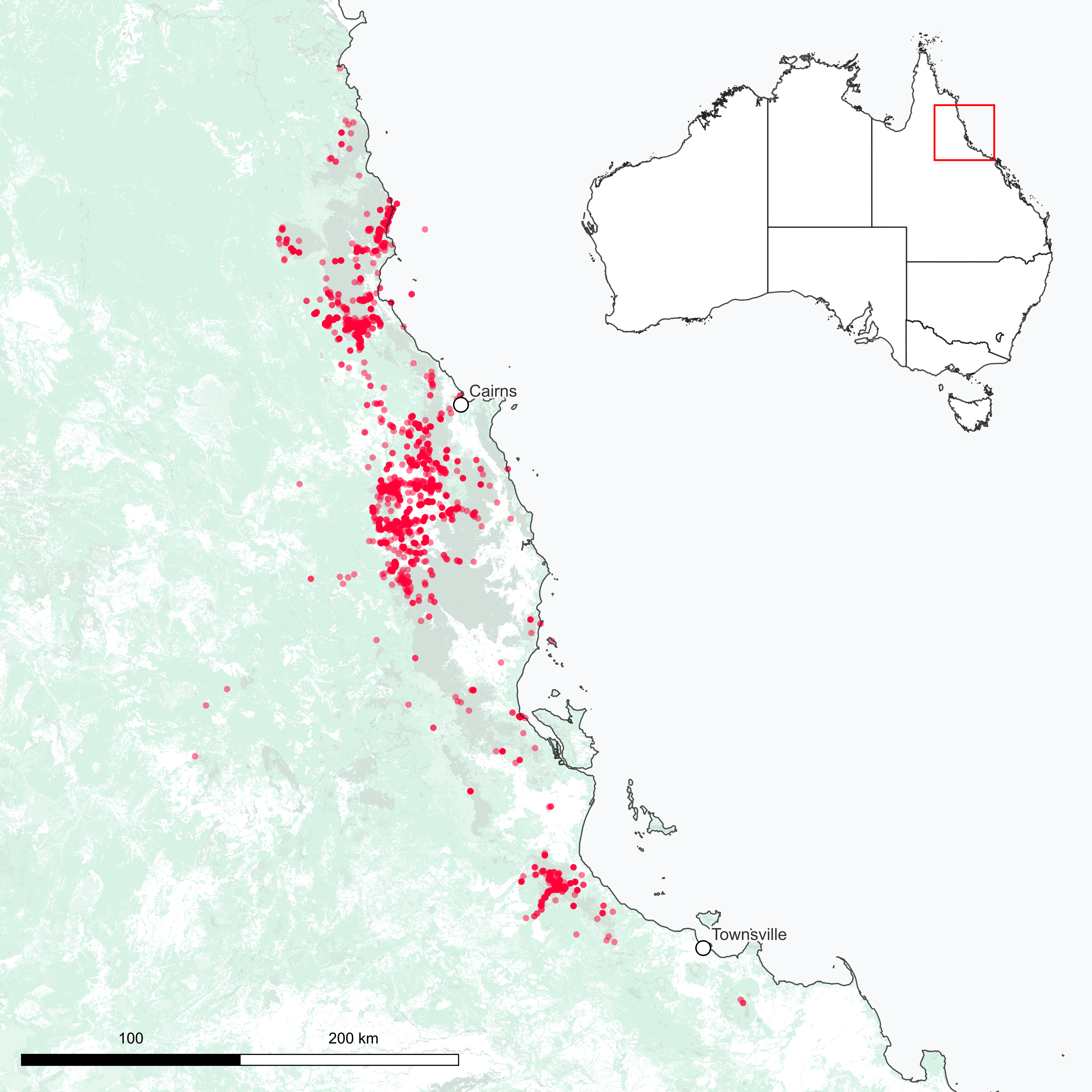
- Species distribution

Synonyms
- Lichenostomus frenatus

= Bridled honeyeater =

Species of bird

The bridled honeyeater (Bolemoreus frenatus) is a species of bird in the family Meliphagidae with distinctive rein-like markings on its face that is endemic to northeastern Queensland. It is found in subtropical or tropical moist upland forests and subtropical or tropical rainforests, usually above 300 meters. In winter, it descends to lower forests including mangroves, and can sometimes be seen in more open habitats.

== Description ==
The bridled honeyeater is a medium to large dusky honeyeater with a white gape and bicoloured bill. It has a blue eye with a yellow line below and white line behind, a yellow tuft on ear and a large, white-grey patch on the side of the neck.

== Taxonomy and systematics ==
The scientific name for the bridled honeyeater is Bolemoreus frenatus (Ramsay, 1874). Initially designated Ptilotis frenata Ramsay, E.P. 1874, then Lichenostomus frenatus and lastly Bolemoreus frenatus. The bird was also called Dorothina frenata when it was placed in the family melithreptide by Gregory Mathews in Volume XI of Birds of Australia p.478. Both the bridled honeyeater and Eungella honeyeater were previously placed in the genus Lichenostomus, but were moved to Bolemoreus after a molecular phylogenetic analysis, published in 2011, showed that the original genus was not a natural unit. The bird belongs to the family Meliphagidae.

The Australian Museum holds syntypes for this species numbered AM O.18560 an adult female, AM O.18561 adult male and AM O.18562 adult female all found in the Cardwell area of Queensland.

The genus name, Bolemoreus, was created in 2011 and derives from "Boles and Longmore's bird" which honours Walter Boles and N. Wayne Longmore two Australian ornithologists. The species name, frenatus, was proposed by Ramsay from the Latin for bridle or reins referring to the markings on the face and base of bill.

== Behaviour and ecology ==
The bridled honeyeater is found in upland rainforest and wet eucalypt forest above an altitude of 300 metres in the Atherton region, north-east Queensland, Australia. The range extends from the Bloomfield-Mt Amos area south to Mt Spec. Some birds move to lower altitude in Winter. The population is considered to be stable with no identified threats or declines. Population is not quantified, although it is considered common in some parts of its range.

When trees are fruiting or flowering the honeyeater may gather in large, quarrelsome flocks but they are otherwise solitary and elusive.

== Gallery ==
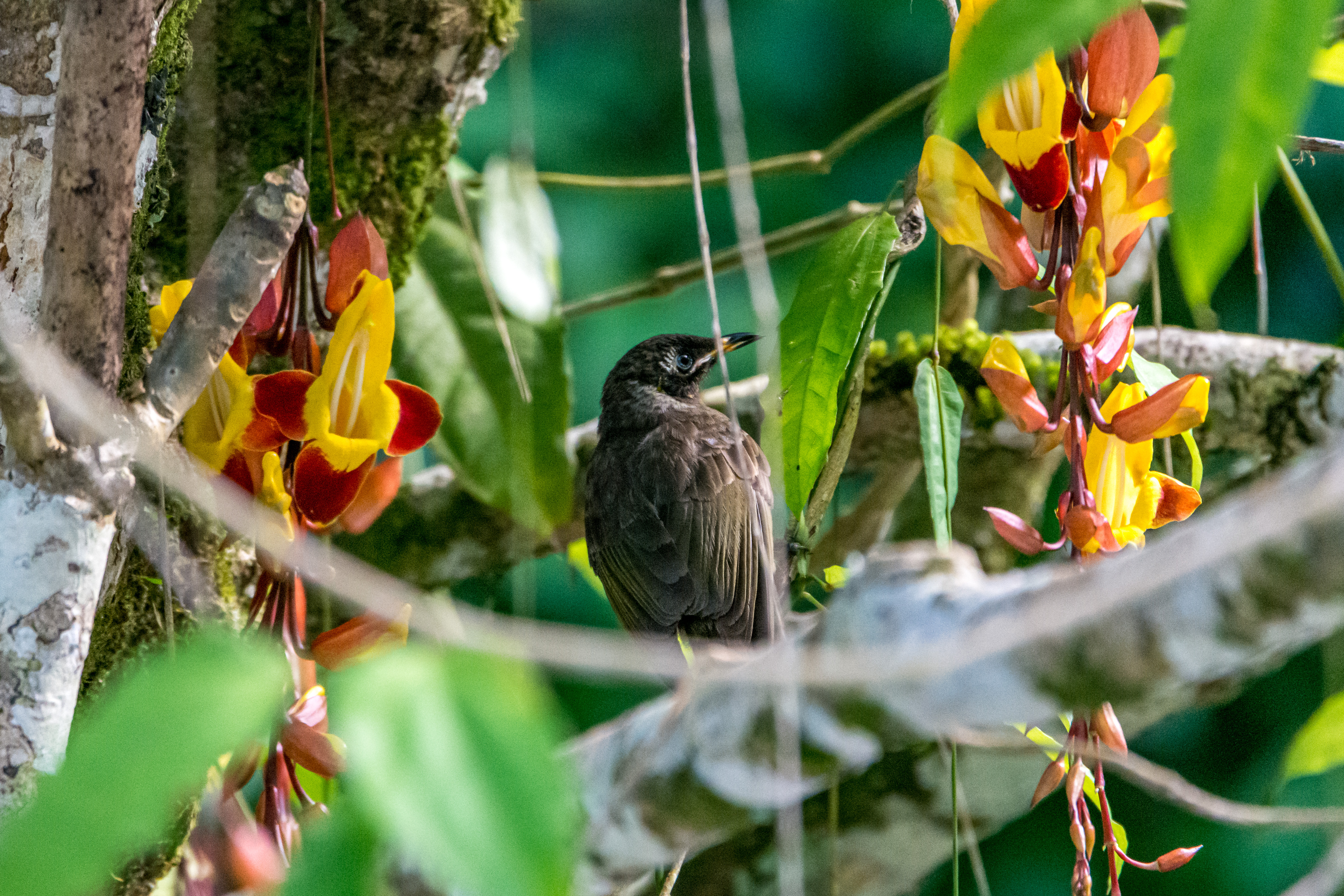

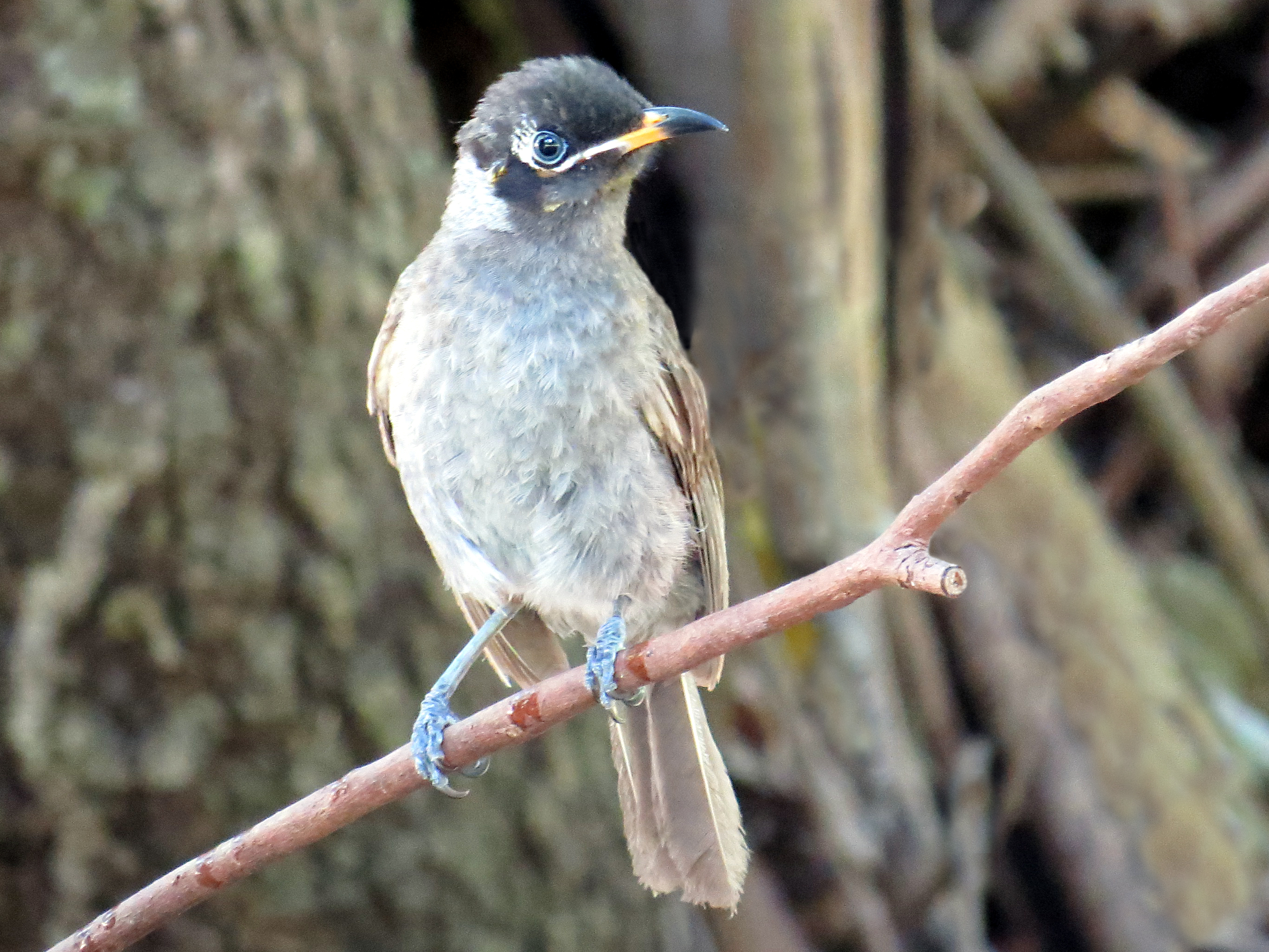
Julatten, north Queensland, Australia.
