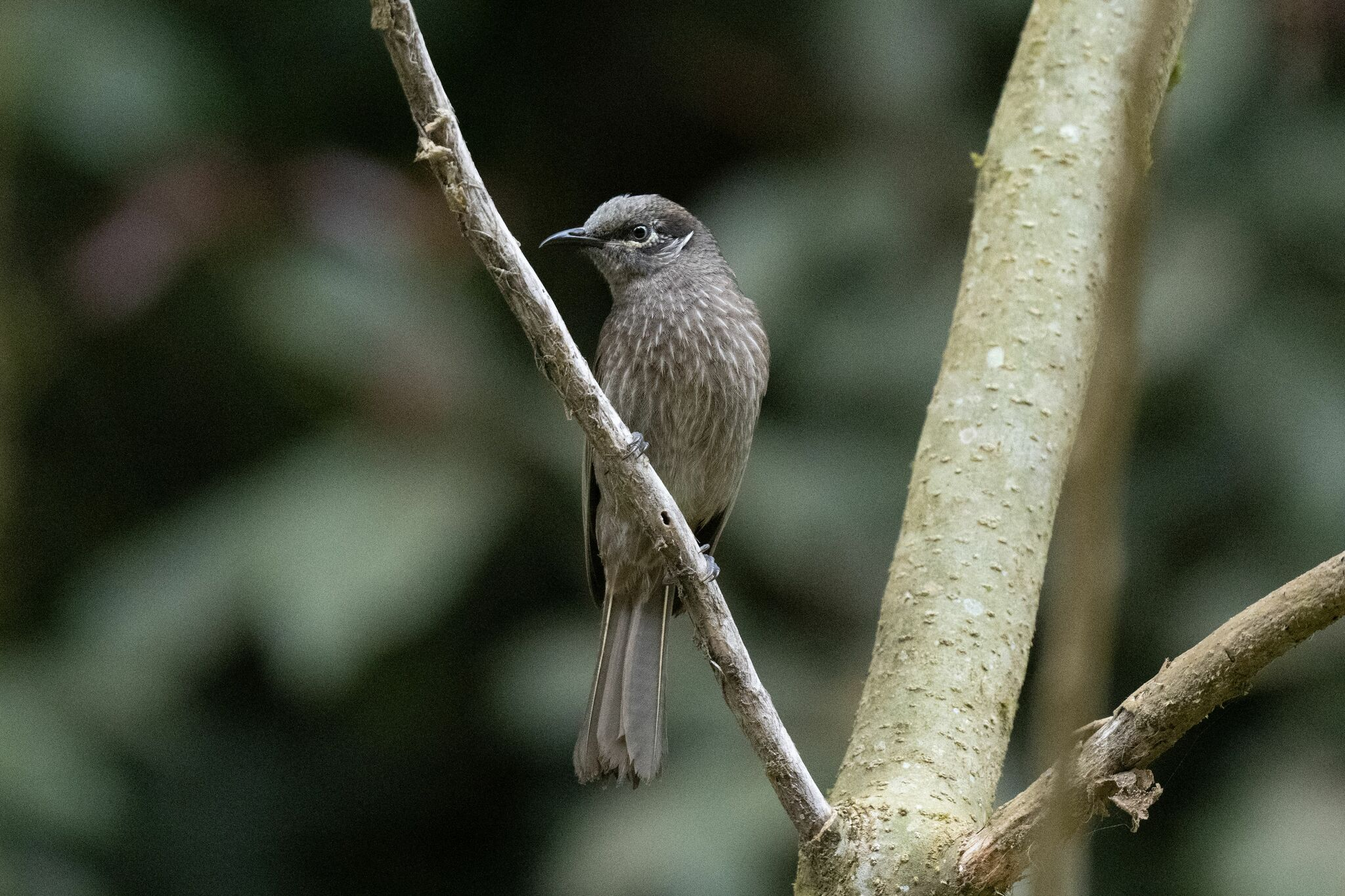

Conservation status
- Near Threatened (IUCN 3.1)

Scientific classification
- Kingdom: Animalia
- Phylum: Chordata
- Class: Aves
- Order: Passeriformes
- Family: Meliphagidae
- Genus: Bolemoreus
- Species: B. hindwoodi

Binomial name
- Bolemoreus hindwoodi (Longmore & Boles, 1983)

Synonyms
- Lichenostomus hindwoodi

= Eungella honeyeater =

Species of bird

The Eungella honeyeater (Bolemoreus hindwoodi) is a species of bird in the family Meliphagidae and is endemic to Australia.

This species is found only in a small area of plateau rainforest in the Clarke Range, west of Mackay, in Queensland. Occasionally, this species can be seen foraging on the rainforest margin and adjacent open forest.

The species name hindwoodi is for Keith Alfred Hindwood (1904–71), an amateur ornithologist, who became the President of the Royal Australasian Ornithologists Union.

The birds at Eungella were long considered to be an outlying population of the bridled honeyeater (Bolemoreus frenatus, formerly Lichenostomus frenatus), but they were described as a separate species in 1983. The story of its discovery is documented here.

'Eungella' (/ˈjʌŋɡɛlə/ YUNG-gel-ə) is believed to be a local Aboriginal word for 'mountain of the mist' or 'land of cloud'.

The Eungella honeyeater was previously placed in the genus Lichenostomus, but was moved to Bolemoreus after a molecular phylogenetic analysis, published in 2011, showed that the original genus was polyphyletic.
