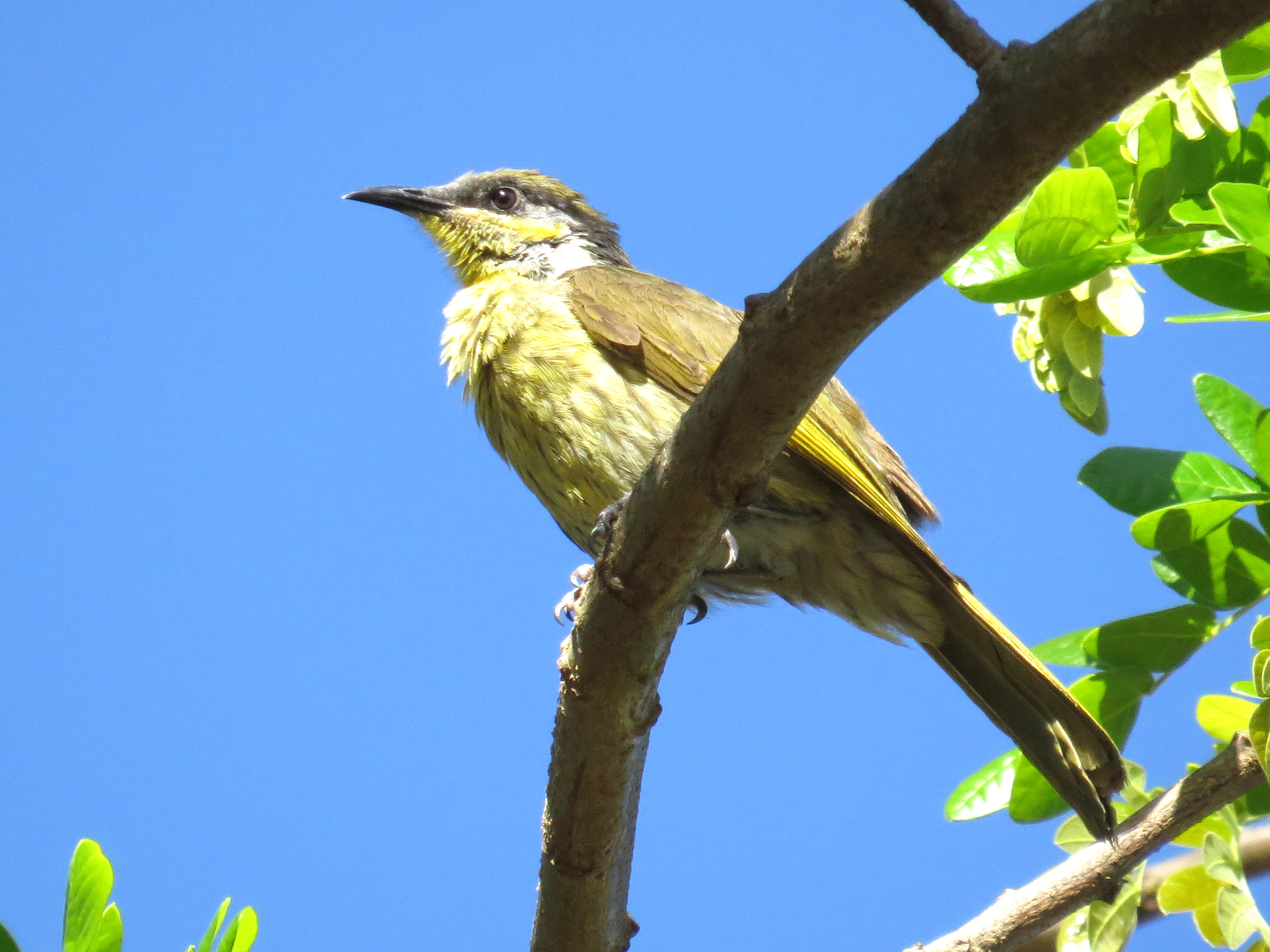

Conservation status
- Least Concern (IUCN 3.1)

Scientific classification
- Kingdom: Animalia
- Phylum: Chordata
- Class: Aves
- Order: Passeriformes
- Family: Meliphagidae
- Genus: Gavicalis
- Species: G. versicolor

Binomial name
- Gavicalis versicolor (Gould, 1843)

Synonyms
- Lichenostomus versicolor

= Varied honeyeater =

Species of bird

The varied honeyeater (Gavicalis versicolor) is a species of bird in the family Meliphagidae. It is found in coastal areas of New Guinea and eastern Cape York Peninsula in Queensland, Australia. Its natural habitat is subtropical or tropical mangrove forests.

The varied honeyeater was previously placed in the genus Lichenostomus, but was moved to Gavicalis after molecular phylogenetic analysis, published in 2011, showed that the original genus was polyphyletic.

== Subspecies ==
The varied honeyeater has two accepted subspecies which are distributed as follows:

G. v. sonoroides - Raja Ampat Island (northwest of New Guinea), Yapen (Geelvink Bay island, northwest New Guinea), coastal New Guinea (except southwest) through northern New Guinea and Milne Bay islands, and D'Entrecasteaux Archipelago (east of southeast New Guinea).

G. v. versicolor - coastal southern New Guinea, Torres Strait islands and northeast Cape York Peninsula, northeast Queensland (far northeast Australia).

== Gallery ==
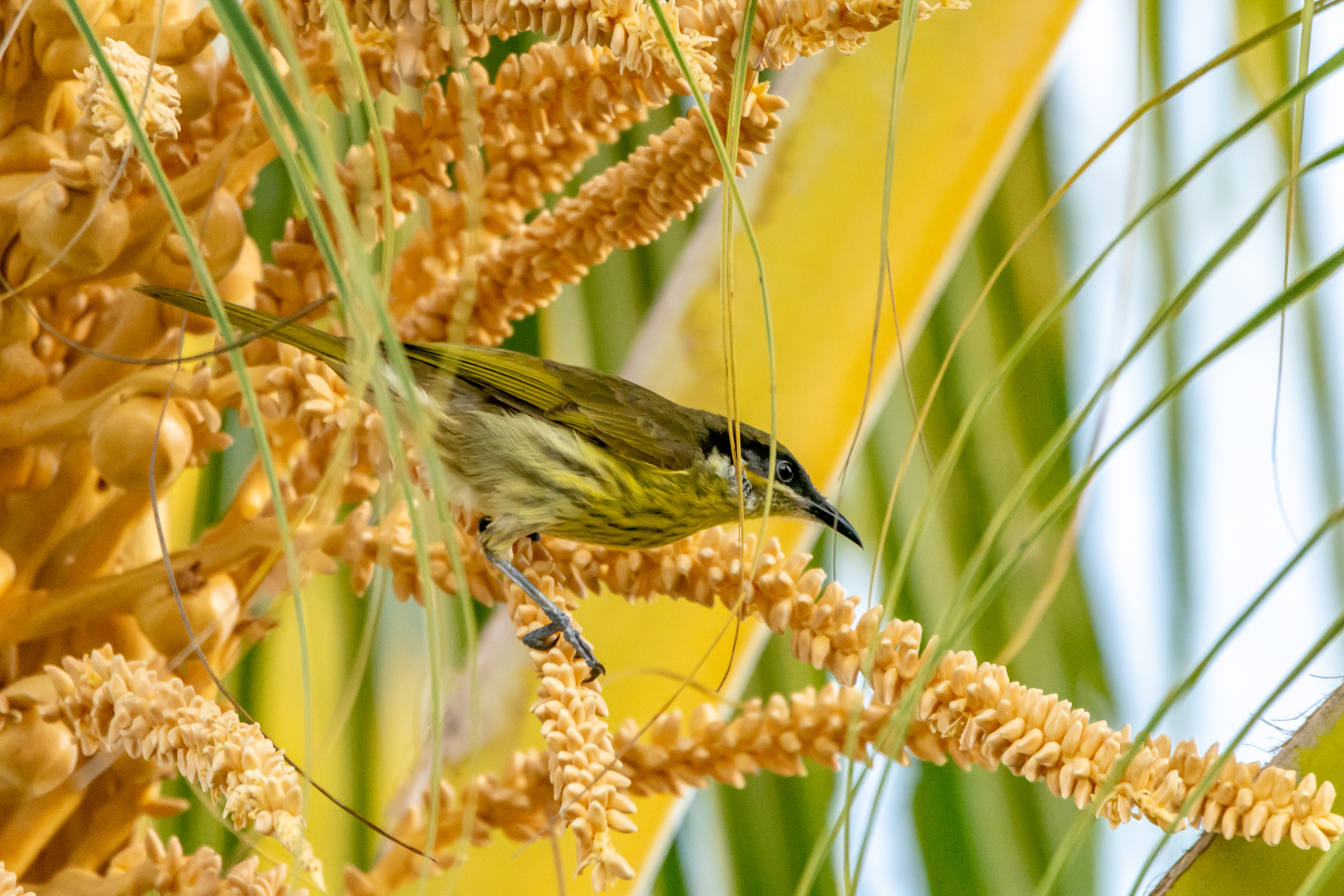
