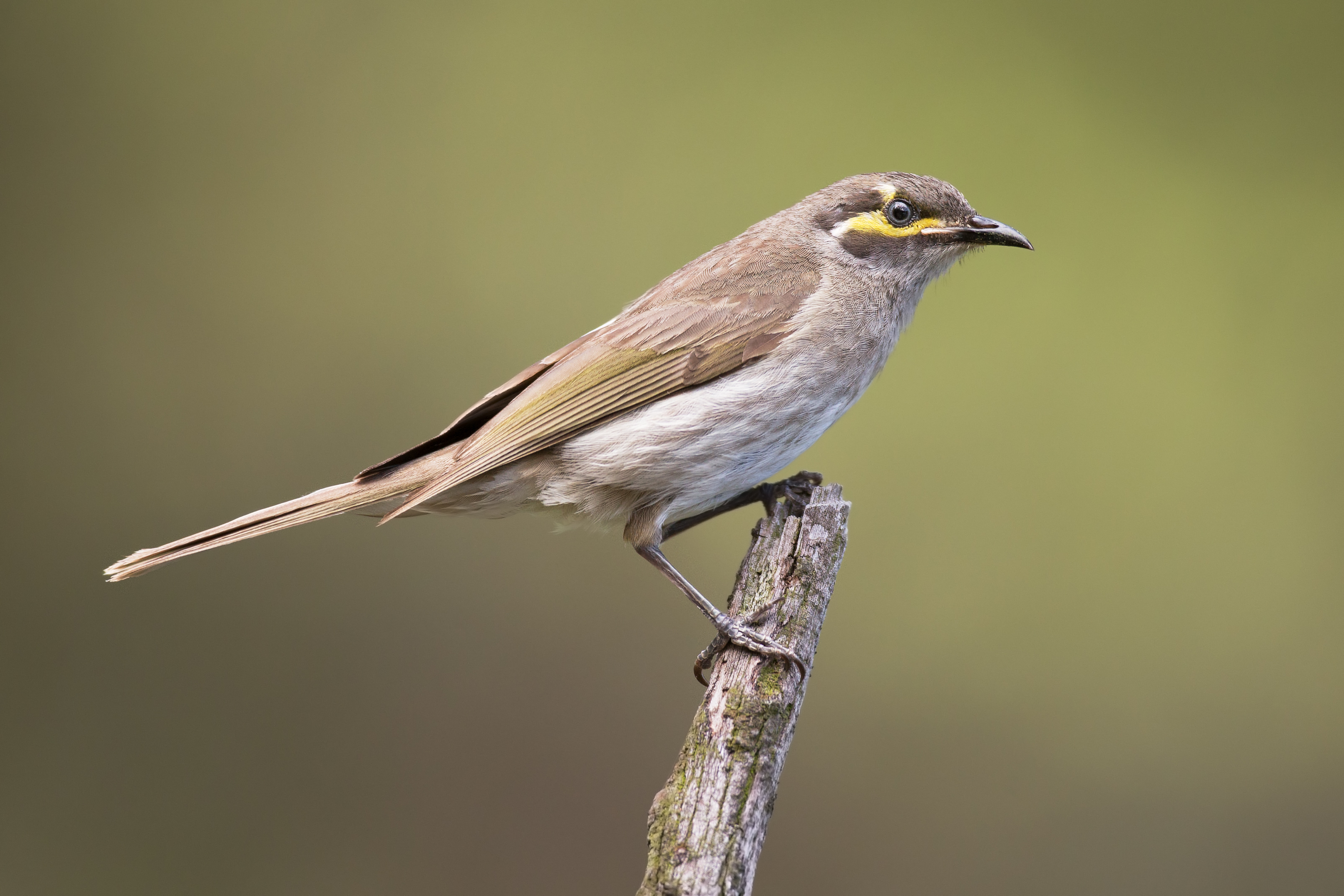
- Caligavis chrysops (yellow-faced honeyeater)

Scientific classification
- Kingdom: Animalia
- Phylum: Chordata
- Class: Aves
- Order: Passeriformes
- Family: Meliphagidae
- Genus: Caligavis; Iredale, 1956

Type species
- Ptilotis obscura De Vis 1897

= Caligavis =

Genus of birds

Caligavis is a genus of honeyeaters endemic to New Guinea and Australia. It includes former members of Lichenostomus, and was created after a molecular phylogenetic analysis published in 2011 showed that the original genus was polyphyletic.

== Species ==
The genus contains three species:

| Image | Scientific name | Common name | Distribution |
|---|---|---|---|
| | C. chrysops | Yellow-faced honeyeater | south, east Australia |
| | C. subfrenata | Black-throated honeyeater | New Guinea |
| | C. obscura | Obscure honeyeater | New Guinea |

The name Caligavis was first proposed by the English-born ornithologist Tom Iredale in 1956. The word is derived from the Latin caligo meaning obscurity and avis bird.
