= BRC =

BRC may refer to:

== Organisations ==
- Bisexual Resource Center, an American educational organisation
- Black Radical Congress, a social justice organisation for those of African descent in the US
- Black Reconstruction Collective, an American architectural collective
- Black Resource Centre, an Aboriginal Australian organisation in the mid-1970s
- Black Rock Coalition, an artists' collective
- British Rabbit Council
- British Red Cross
- British Retail Consortium, a British trade association
- Brotherhood of Railway Carmen, an American trade union
- Bulgarian Red Cross

== Research institutes ==
- Bioinformatics Resource Centers, a group of Internet-based research centres for infectious disease research
- Biological Records Centre, a data and records repository for UK species
- Biological Research Centre (Hungarian Academy of Sciences)
- Biomedical Research Center, at Qatar University

== Sport ==
- BRC Racing Team, an Italian auto racing team
- Banco Rugby Club, an Argentine rugby club
- Bengal Rowing Club
- Big Rivers Conference, a high school athletic conference in Wisconsin
- Bob Radcliffe Cup, a Northern Irish association football tournament
- Brisbane Racing Club
- Brisbane River Classic
- British Rally Championship, a former car rallying series in the UK

== Transport ==
- Belt Railway of Chicago, Illinois
- Breich railway station, Scotland
- San Carlos de Bariloche Airport, Argentina
- Vadodara Junction railway station, India

== Other uses ==
- Basic Reconnaissance Course of the United States Marine Corps Reconnaissance Training Company
- Belconnen Remand Centre, in the Australian Capital Territory
- Berbice Creole Dutch
- Biometric Residence Card
- Black Rock City, a temporary city created by Burning Man festival participants
- Brady Corporation
- Brazilian cruzado, a former currency
- BRC Imagination Arts, an American themed entertainment company
- Buckinghamshire Railway Centre, a railway museum
- Buddhist Retreat Centre, in Ixopo, South Africa
- Bomb Rush Cyberfunk, a 2023 video game
