= Moreton Bay Classic =

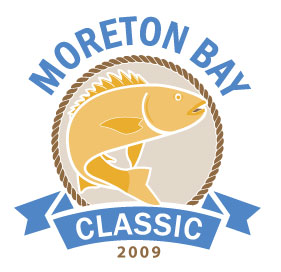
Moreton Bay Classic logo

The Moreton Bay Classic ('MBC') is a yearly fishing tournament run by Brisbane Fishing Online held in Moreton Bay in South East Queensland, Australia. The event (which went from one to two days duration in 2009), takes place in May. In 2009, the tournament expanded from two prize categories to eight. In 2010, prize categories were re-evaluated resulting in a solid five categories rendering fierce competition between anglers.

The tournament is a Photo and Release event, whereby no fish are required to be removed from the location they are caught. A photo is taken of the fish and then the fish can be released following responsible fishing guidelines encouraged by the Qld Fisheries's Survival Guide. This is responsible fishing and as such is one of the leading fishing tournaments in Australia that is promoting sustainable and healthy fishing practices.

== Current Moreton Bay Classic Prize Categories ==
Category
Longest Bream
Longest Snapper
Longest Tailor
Longest Flathead
Longest Mackerel

== Previous Moreton Bay Classic Prize Categories ==
Category
Longest Whiting
Longest Estuary Cod
Longest Grassy Sweetlip

== Moreton Bay Classic Fishing Tournament Results ==
Moreton Bay Classic Fishing Tournament Results
Year	Longest Bream Category			Longest Snapper Category			Longest Tailor Category			Longest Flathead Category			Longest Mackerel Category			Longest Whiting Category			Longest Estuary Cod Category			Longest Grassy Sweetlip Category		
Year	1st	2nd	3rd	1st	2nd	3rd	1st	2nd	3rd	1st	2nd	3rd	1st	2nd	3rd	1st	2nd	3rd	1st	2nd	3rd	1st	2nd	3rd
2008	TBA	TBA	TBA	TBA	TBA	TBA	TBA	TBA	TBA	TBA	TBA	TBA	TBA	TBA	TBA	TBA	TBA	TBA	TBA	TBA	TBA	TBA	TBA	TBA
2009	Baden Phillips: 297mm	Jeff Flynn: 293mm	Terry Langham: 290mm	Rob Low: 480mm	Mark Sheehan: 450mm	Jamie Bowles: 420mm	Shannon Johanson: 368mm	Jeff Flynn: 365mm	Wes Watson: 345mm	Henry Do: 560mm	Shannon Johanson: 515mm	Wes Watson: 440mm	Wes Watson: 410mm	Not Awarded	Not Awarded	Ian Ferguson: 200mm	Not Awarded	Not Awarded	Jamie Bowles: 520mm	Not Awarded	Not Awarded	Travis Warren: 300mm	Jeff Flynn: 280mm	Darren Griepink: 275mm
Year	Longest Bream Category			Longest Snapper Category			Longest Tailor Category			Longest Flathead Category			Longest Mackerel Category											
Year	1st	2nd	3rd	1st	2nd	3rd	1st	2nd	3rd	1st	2nd	3rd	1st	2nd	3rd									
2010	Henry Do: 346mm	Kris Sweres: 315mm	Luke Doyle: 286mm	Dan Watters: 661mm	Cliff Lugton: 630mm	Mick Nash: 529mm	Jamie Bowles: 467mm	Ben Evans: 453mm	Tom Lazlo: 442mm	Kris Sweres: 540mm	Dayle Banks: 528mm	Ben Evans: 490mm	Jamie Bowles: 636mm	Merv Chen: 418mm	Liesbeth Thie: 411mm									
2011	Name: 000mm	Name: 000mm	Name: 000mm	Name: 000mm	Name: 000mm	Name: 000mm	Name: 000mm	Name: 000mm	Name: 000mm	Name: 000mm	Name: 000mm	Name: 000mm	Name: 000mm	Name: 000mm	Name: 000mm									
Year	Longest Bream Category			Longest Snapper Category			Longest Tailor Category			Longest Flathead Category						Longest Whiting Category			Longest Trevally Category					
Year	1st	2nd	3rd	1st	2nd	3rd	1st	2nd	3rd	1st	2nd	3rd	1st	2nd	3rd	1st	2nd	3rd	1st	2nd	3rd			
2012	James Howarth: 398mm	NA	NA	Brian Ellis: 564mm	NA	NA	No Submissions	NA	NA	Richard Jackson: 540mm	NA	NA				Wayne Young: 410mm	NA	NA	Jarryd Aleckson: 323mm	NA	NA			

== Similar Events ==
Other fishing tournaments with a similar format are the Brisbane River Classic and State of Origin fishing competition.
