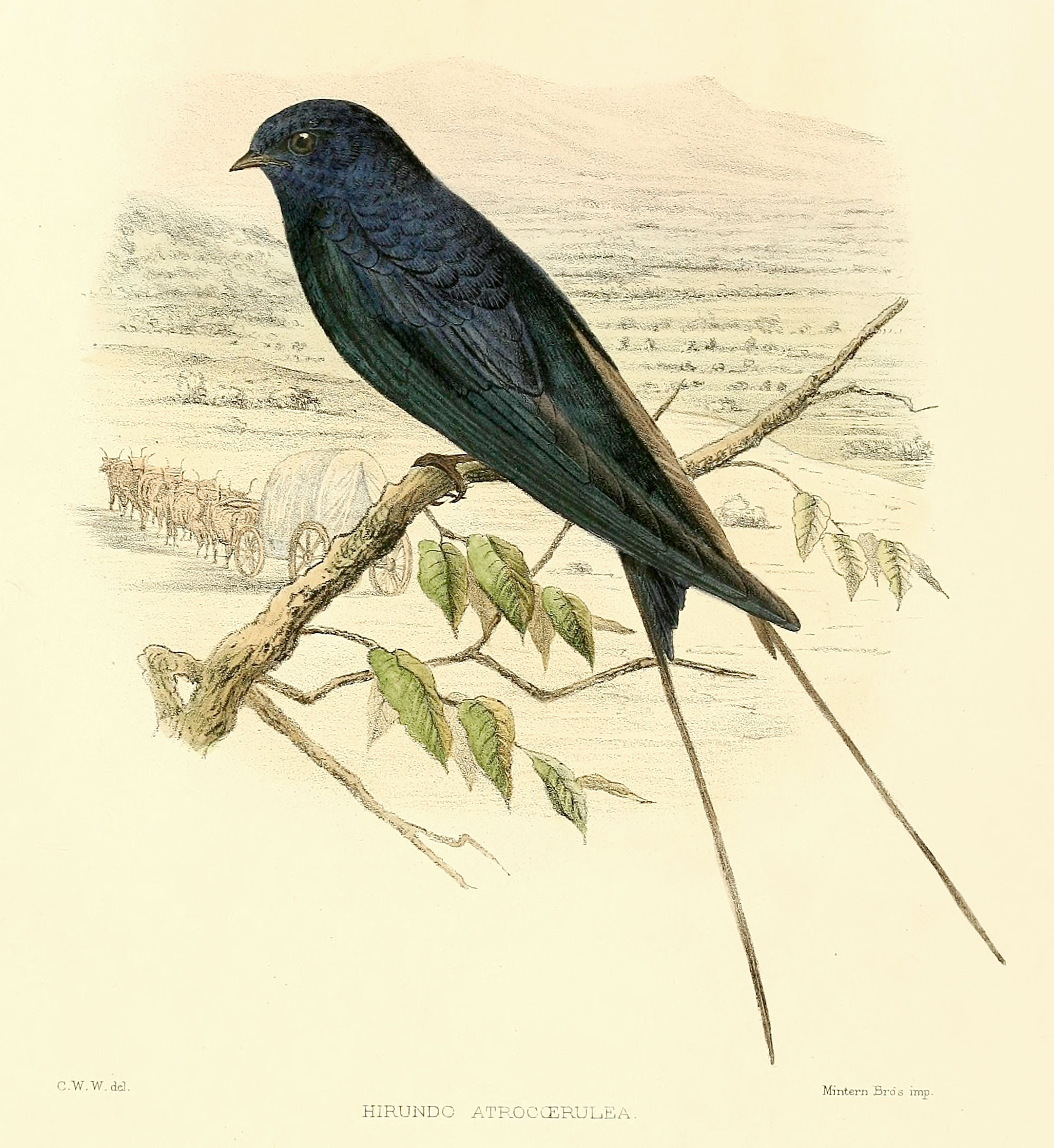
- Illustration by R. B. Sharpe (1894)
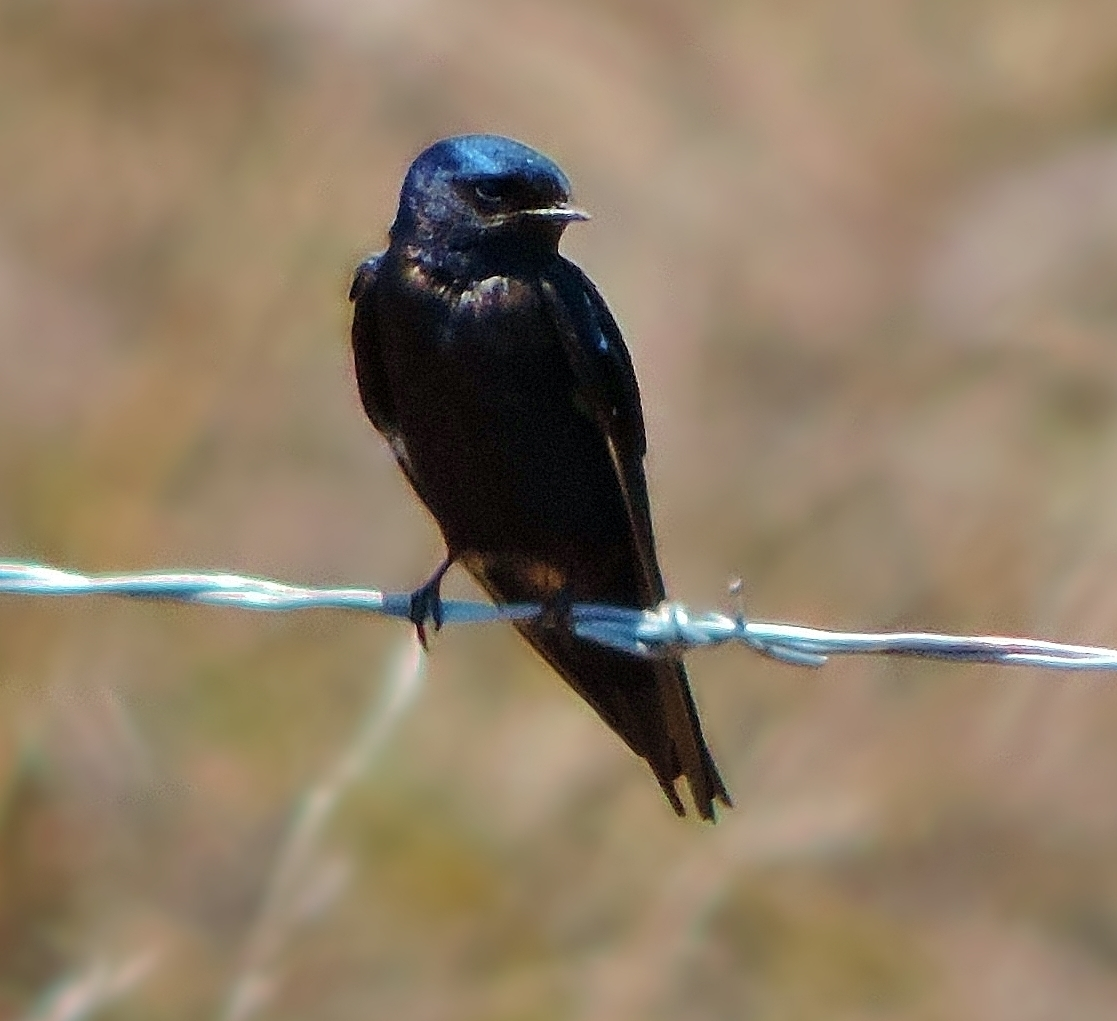

Conservation status
- Endangered (IUCN 3.1)

Scientific classification
- Kingdom: Animalia
- Phylum: Chordata
- Class: Aves
- Order: Passeriformes
- Family: Hirundinidae
- Genus: Hirundo
- Species: H. atrocaerulea

Binomial name
- Hirundo atrocaerulea Sundevall, 1850

= Blue swallow =

Species of bird

The blue swallow (Hirundo atrocaerulea) is a small bird within the swallow family which is in the order Passeriformes. Swallows are somewhat similar in habits and appearance to other aerial insectivores, such as the martins (also a passerine) and the swifts (order Apodiformes). It breeds in the Afromontane (from South Africa to Tanzania), wintering north of Lake Victoria.

This bird breeds in montane grassland, preferring high rainfall, undulating areas. In winter it prefers open grassland, with bushes and trees. The nest is usually attached to the roof or side of a hole in the ground.

== Description ==
This species is a small swallow at 18–25 centimetres (7.1–9.8 in). Adult birds have a highly lustrous dark metallic steel-blue appearance and long tail streamers, which are particularly noticeable in males. White feathers are visible on the rump and flanks when the birds are preening and especially during courtship. In poor light, blue swallows appear almost black and therefore can be mistaken for black saw-wing swallows (Psalidoprocne spp.) which occur throughout its breeding range. Young blue swallows start life a brownish-grey, acquiring their blue colour as they mature. This species has a "chip-chip" song and a musical "bee-bee-bee-bee" call when in nuptial flight.

== Biology ==
Blue swallows feed on small, soft-bodied flies and other arthropods, catching them on the wing.

The blue swallow arrives on the breeding range at the end of September and constructs cup-shaped nests from mud and grass on the inside of sinkhole cavities, aardvark burrows and old mine shafts. The breeding system of the blue swallow is not well understood although co-operative breeding has been widely recorded in this species. The nests are lined with fine grass, animal hair and white feathers. Normally, three white eggs are laid. They are incubated by the female for 14 days, and the chicks are fed for approximately 22 days until they fledge. Once fledged, the young spend the next couple of days around the nest site before disappearing. Most blue swallows will rear a second brood before returning to the over-wintering grounds in April.

== Threats ==
This species is classified as Endangered due to destruction of its habitat at both its breeding and wintering sites. The current population is estimated at 1,500-4,000 and decreasing. The Buddhist Retreat Centre in eXobho, South Africa, is notable for its long-term involvement in conservation, in particular for protecting breeding habitat of the Blue Swallow. The Centre encompasses known breeking sites and the Nirodha Nature Reserve was awarded conservation status in recognition of its role in protecting the mist-belt grasslands which this species depends on for nesting. As stewards of the Blue Swallow, the BRC allows day visitors to view the birds for a small donation.
