= Moreton Bay =

Inlet in southern Queensland, Australia

- Quandamooka
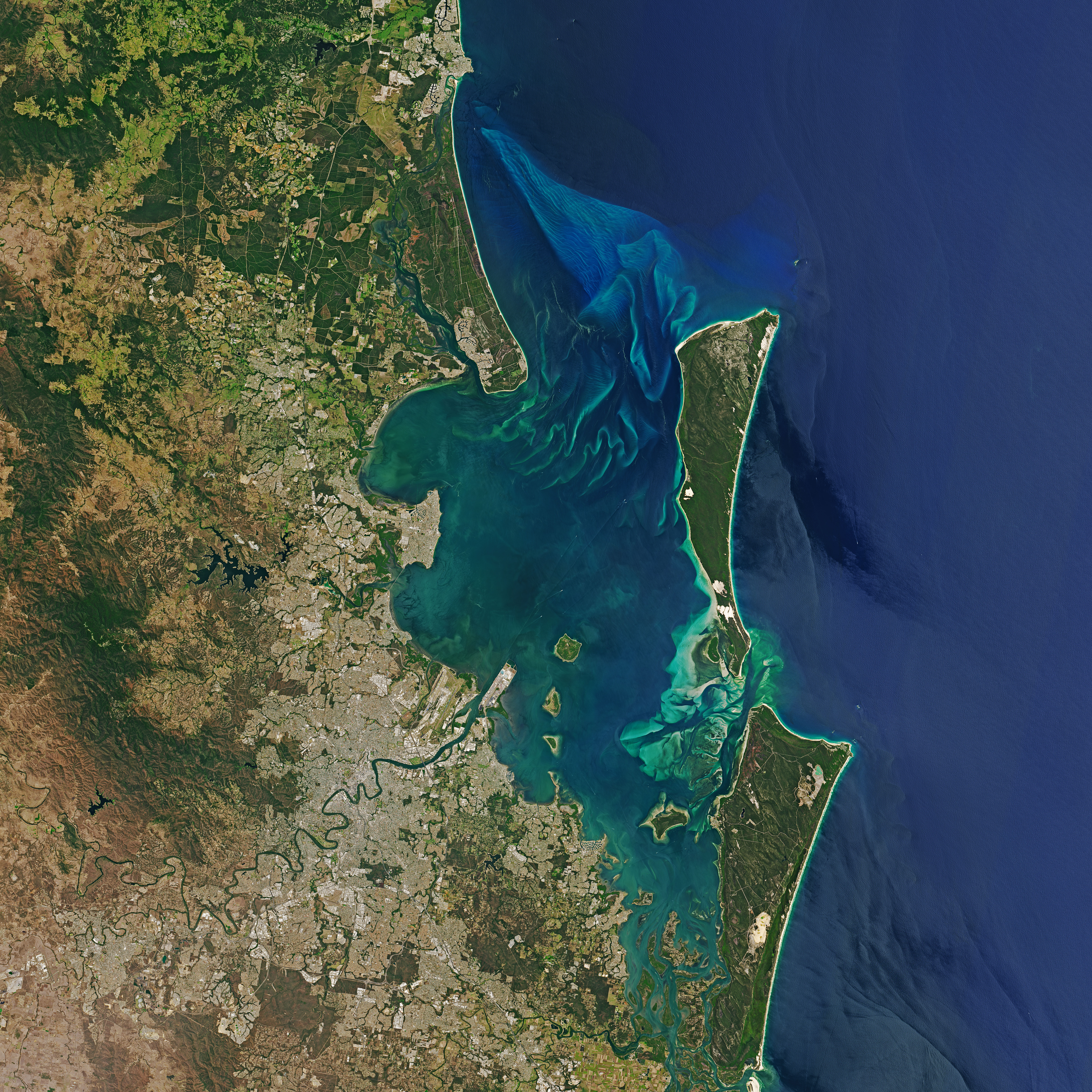
- Moreton Bay and the Brisbane metropolitan area

- Location within Queensland

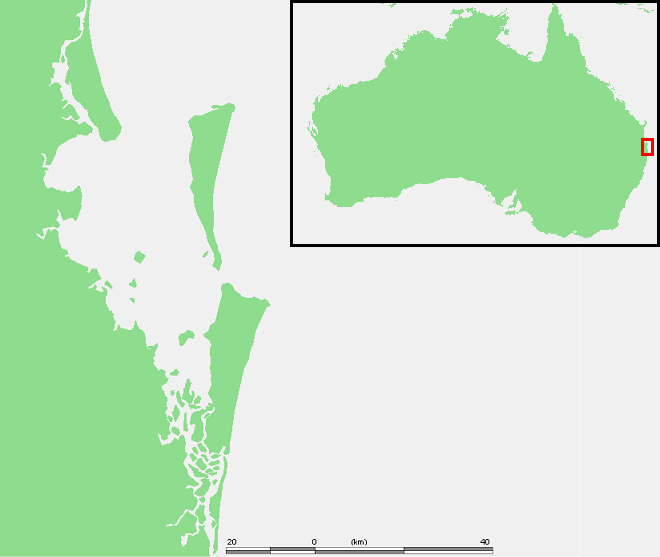
- Location of Moreton Bay in South East Queensland
- Location: South East Queensland
- Coordinates: 27°15′S 153°15′E
- Etymology: In honour of Lord Morton
- River sources: Caboolture River; Pine River; Brisbane River; Logan River; Albert River; Pimpama River
- Ocean/sea sources: Coral Sea
- Catchment area: 21,220 km^{2} (8,190 sq mi)
- Basin countries: Australia
- Max. length: 125 km (78 mi)
- Max. width: 35 km (22 mi)
- Surface area: 1,523 km^{2} (588 sq mi)
- Average depth: 6.8 m (22 ft)
- Frozen: never
- Islands: Moreton Island; Southern Moreton Bay Islands; Coochiemudlo Island; Peel Island; Bribie Island; North Stradbroke Island; South Stradbroke Island
- Settlements: Brisbane

Ramsar Wetland
- Designated: 22 October 1993
- Reference no.: 631

Moreton Bay is a bay on the eastern coast of Australia 14 kilometres (8.7 mi) from central Brisbane, Queensland. It is one of Queensland's most important coastal resources. The waters of Moreton Bay are a popular destination for recreational anglers and are used by commercial operators who provide seafood to market.

The Port of Brisbane coordinates large traffic along the shipping channel which crosses the northern section of the bay. The bay serves as a safe approach to the airport and reduces noise pollution over the city to the west of the runway. A number of barge, ferry and water-taxi services also travel over the bay.

Moreton Bay was the site of conflict between the Quandamooka people and early European settlers. It contains environmentally significant habitats and large areas of sandbanks. The bay is the only place in Australia where dugong gather into herds. Many parts of the mainland foreshore and southern islands are settled.

The waters of Moreton Bay are relatively calm, being sheltered from large swells by Moreton Island and North Stradbroke Island. In 2009 as part of the Q150 celebrations, the Moreton Bay was announced as one of the Q150 Icons of Queensland for its role as a "Natural attraction". Moreton Bay is a Pacific Ocean Hope Spot.

== History ==
=== Early history ===
Moreton Bay was formed roughly 6000 years ago as the sea level rose and inundated what was then the floodplains of the Brisbane River. Moreton Bay and its islands were inhabited by the Quandamooka people. The indigenous economy was very rich, one of the strongest for its productive yields of edible natural resources on the Australian continent. Of particular importance for the interclan trade and ceremonial life were in particular massive oyster beds, the annual mullet catch, and bunya nut harvesting, on the coast and inland, which led to annual migrations either way to enjoy the abundance of the respective tribal group's territory.

An 1823 account by explorer John Uniacke described the importance of fish, kangaroo, and fern-root called dingowa in the diet of the local tribes. His paper, 'Natives of Moreton Bay' also has a detailed summary of inter-tribal fights in the Bribie Island region, as witnessed by castaways John Finnegan and Thomas Pamphlett.

In the 1840s, resident white administrators estimated the Aboriginal population of the area to be around 4,000. They were only outnumbered with the influx over the five-year period of 1850–1855 that saw the disembarkation of 3,000 European migrants on their land.

=== European exploration and settlement ===
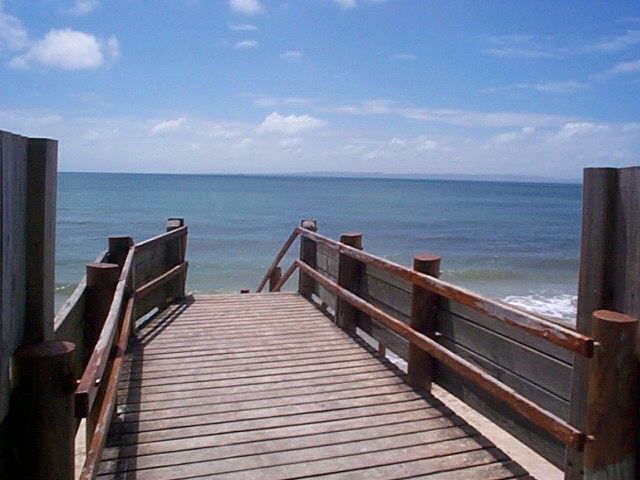
Matthew Flinders sailed between Moreton Island and Bribie Island in 1799.

Map of Moreton Bay made in 1842 by Robert Dixon (high resolution image)

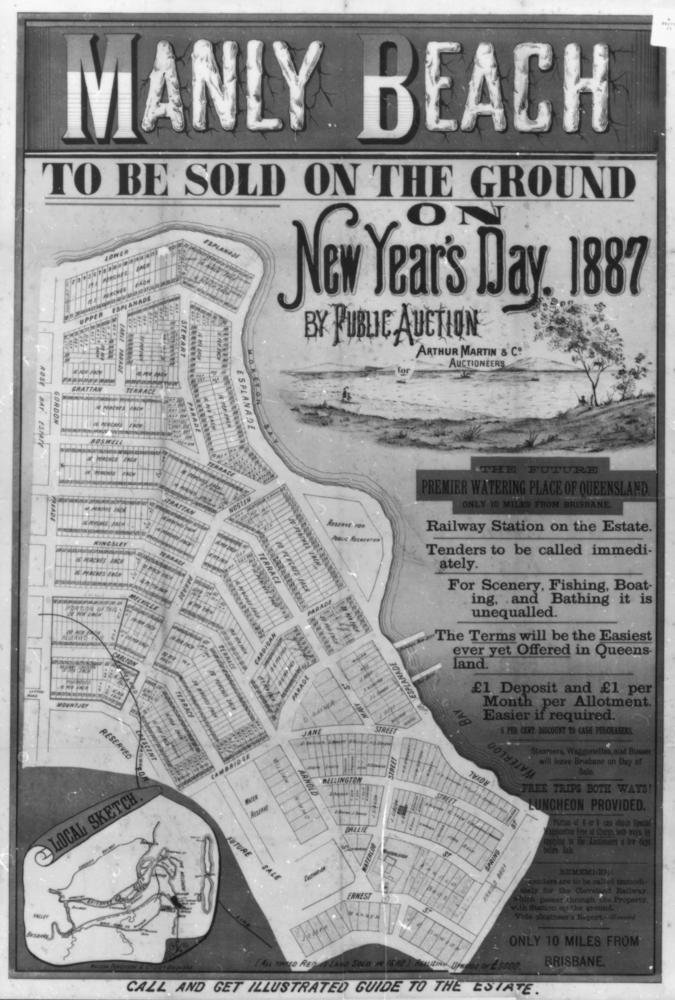
Land for sale in Manly in 1887

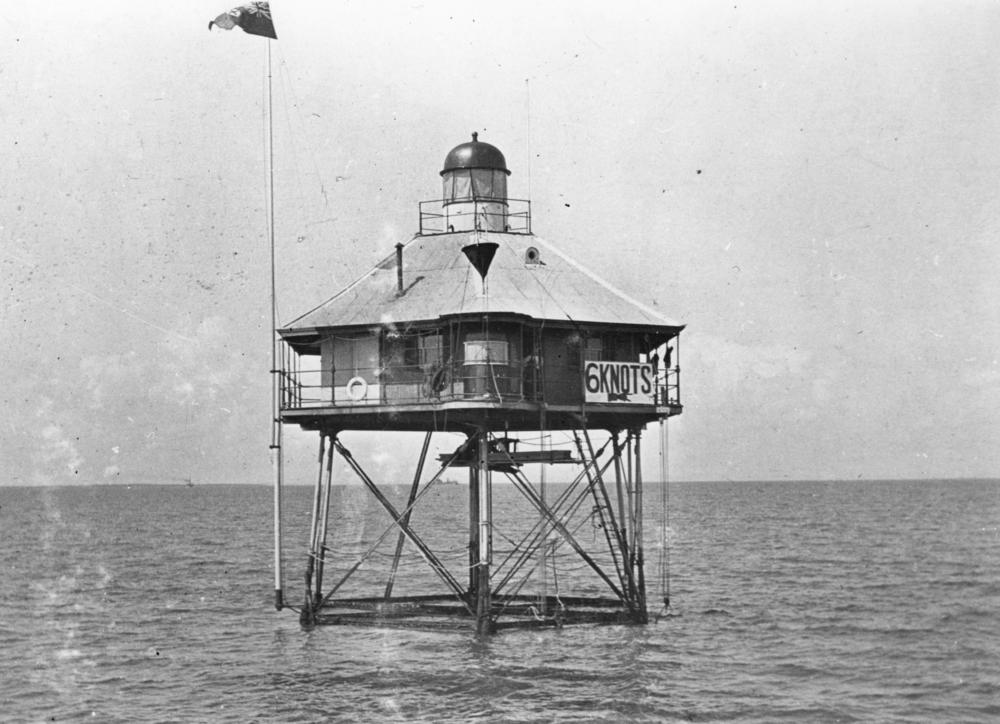
Moreton Bay Pile Light, c. 1912

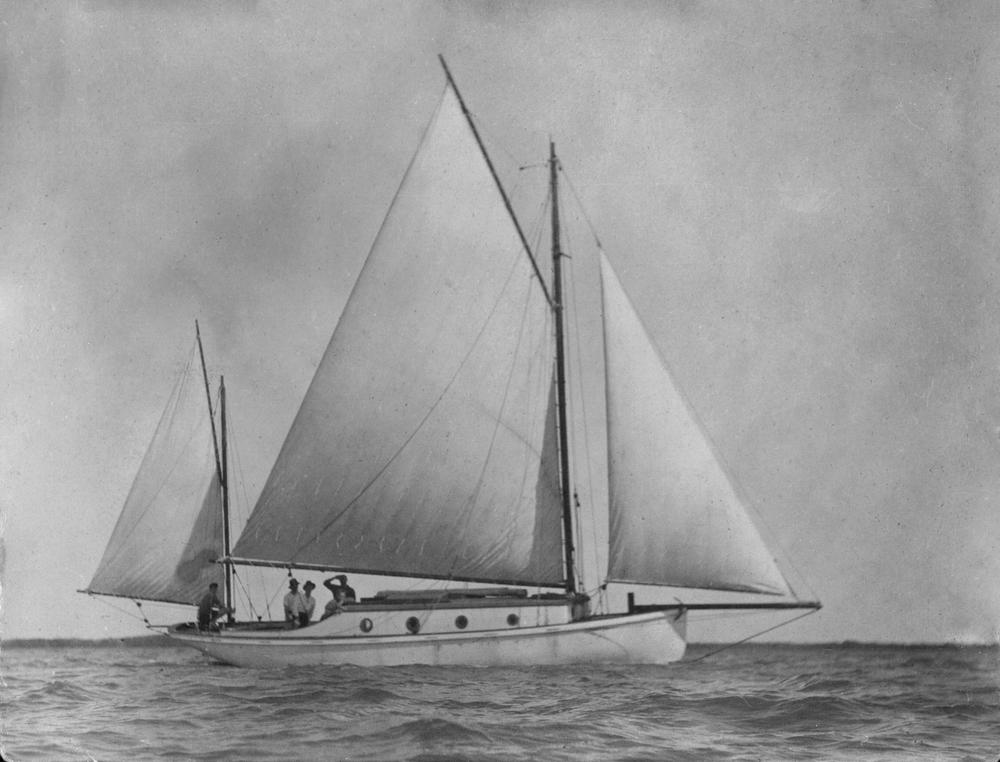
Sailing on Moreton Bay in 1915

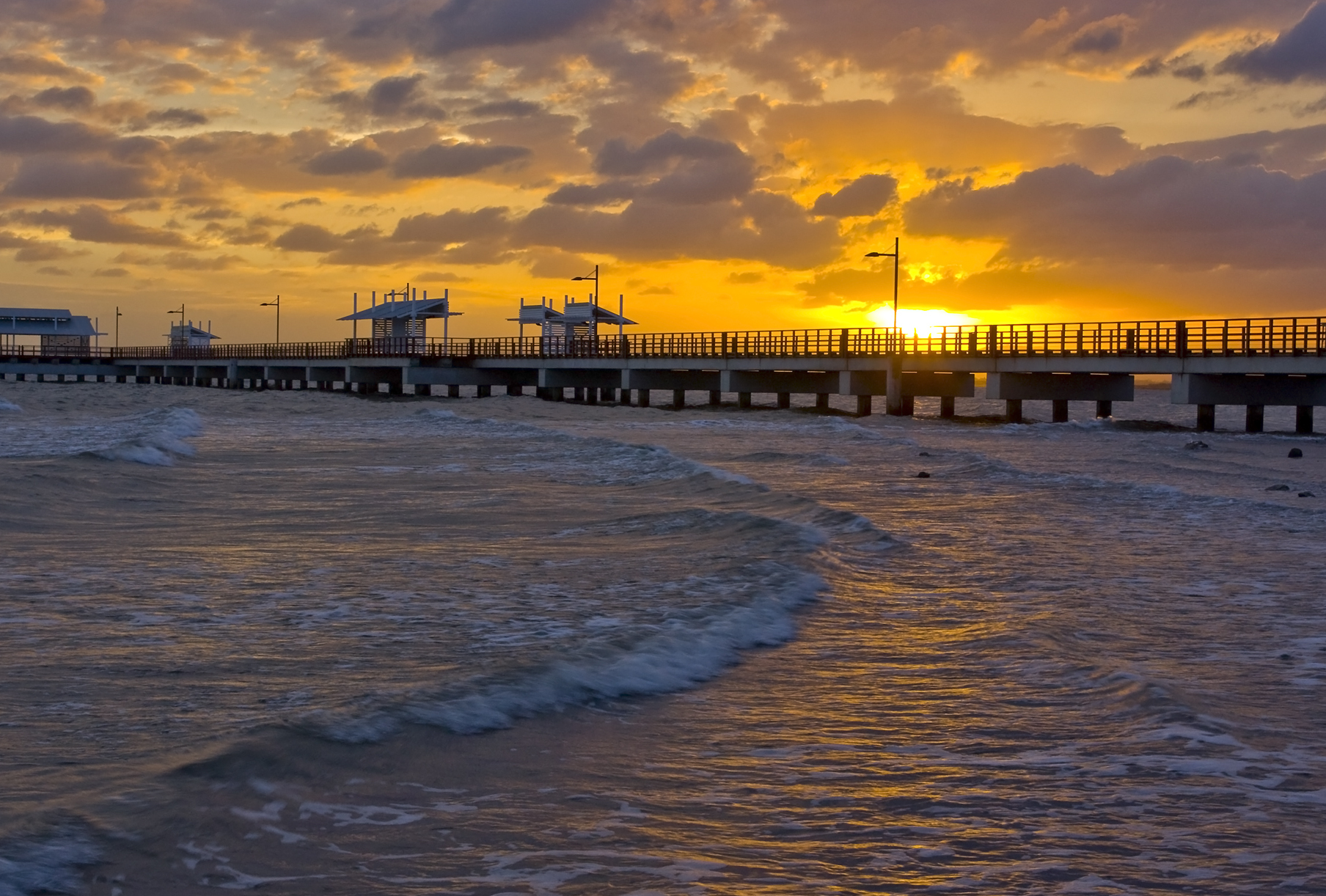
Woody Point jetty at Woody Point

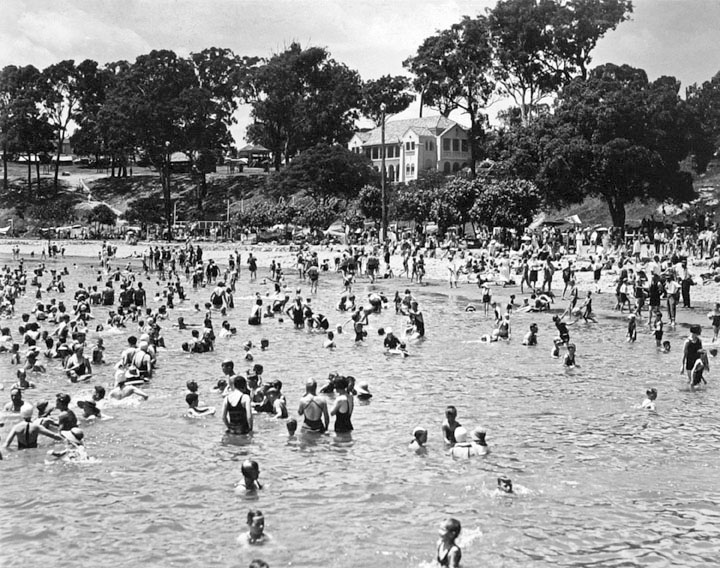
Beach scene, Sandgate December 1937

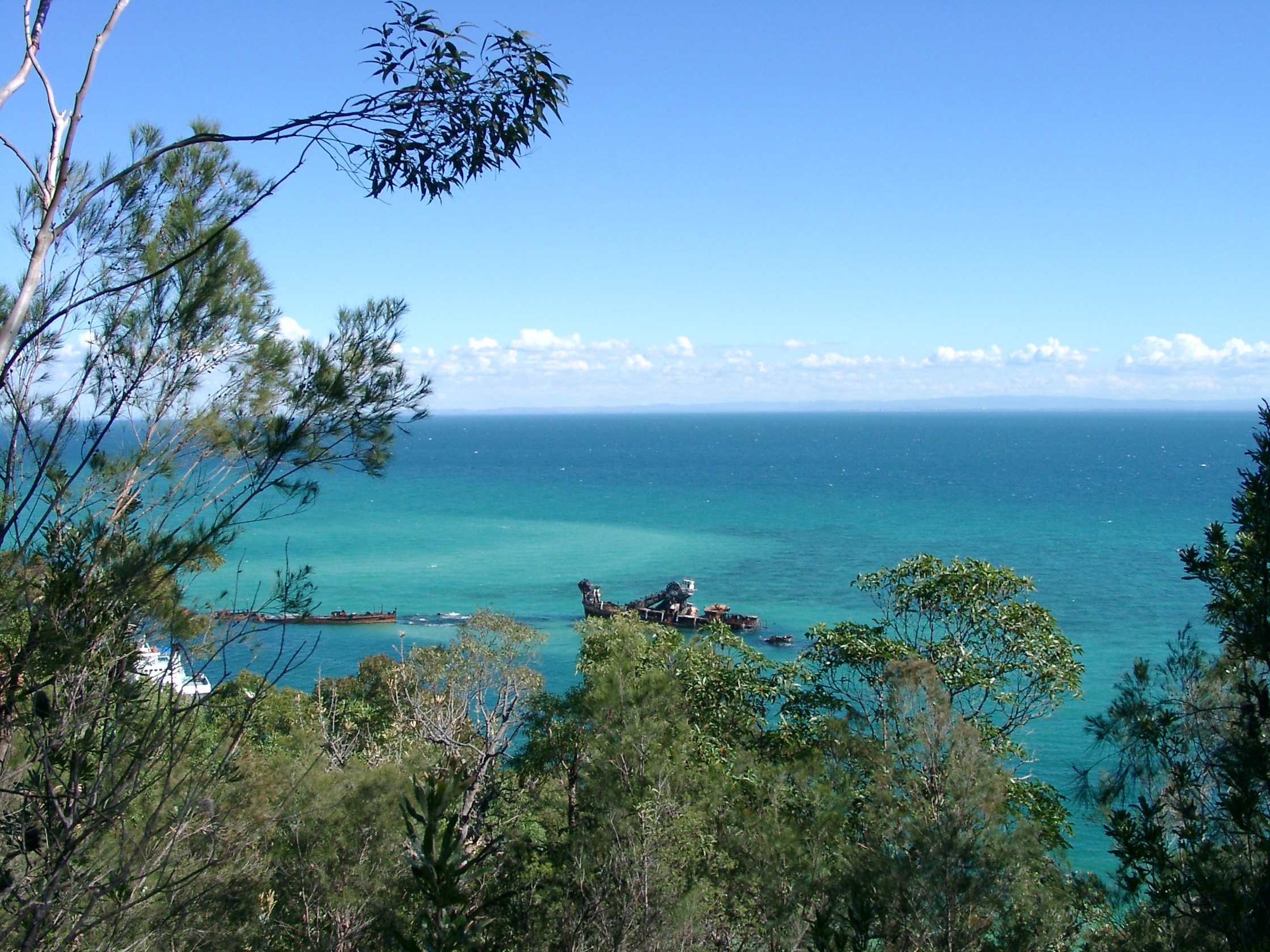
The first of the Tangalooma Wrecks were placed in 1963, one year after the whaling station ceased operations.

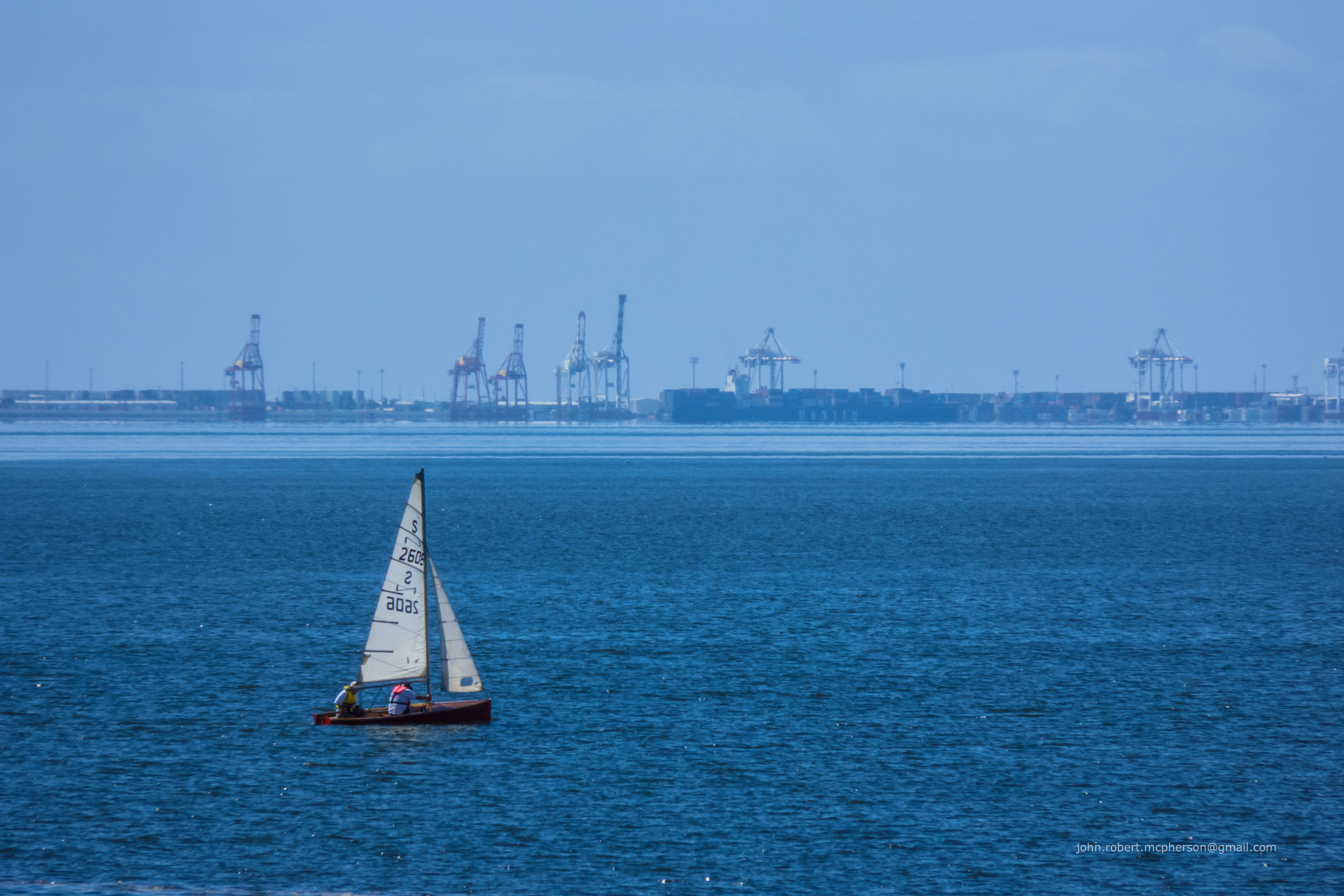
The Port of Brisbane from Bramble Bay

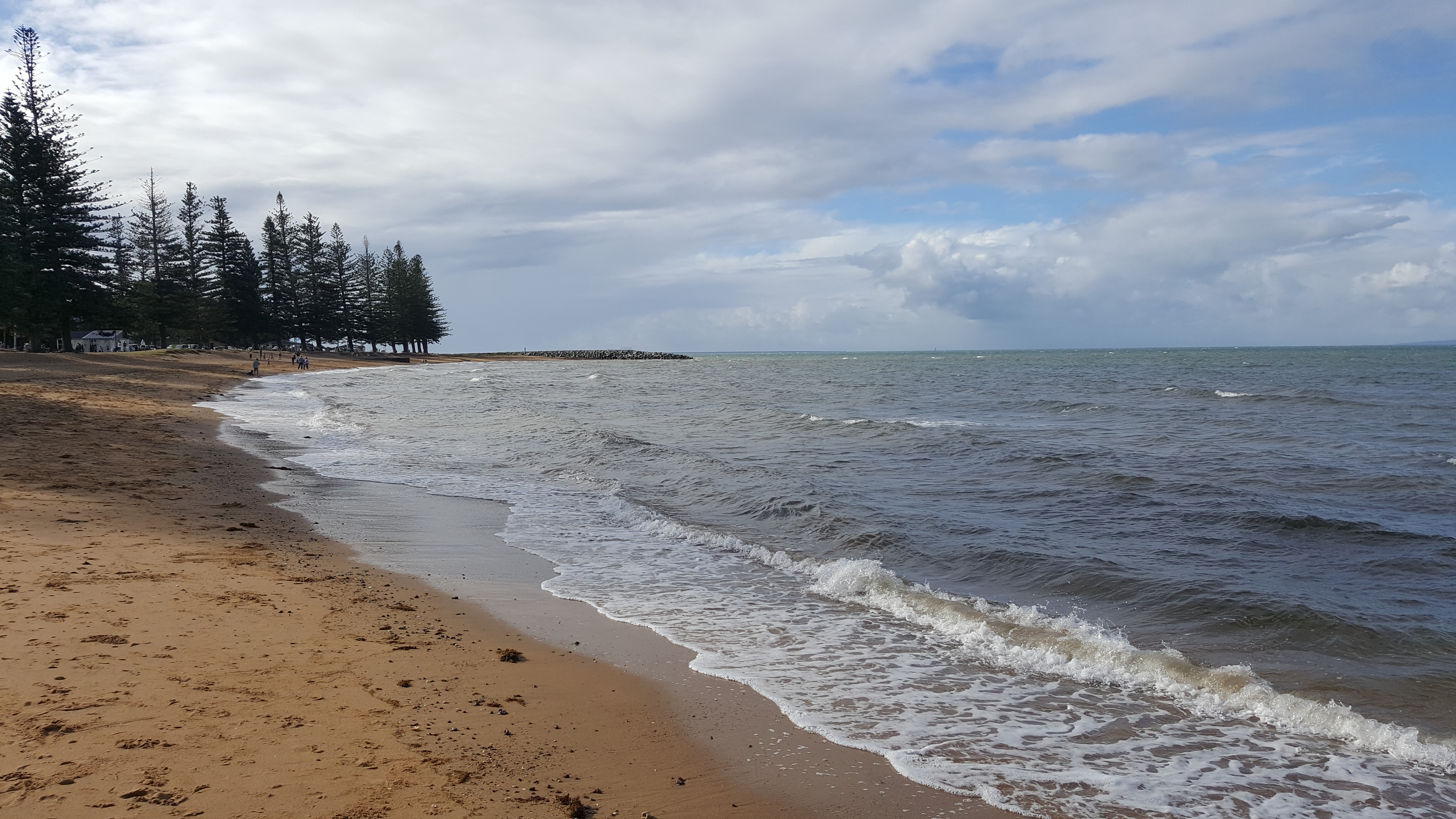
Scarborough Beach at Scarborough on the Redcliffe Peninsula

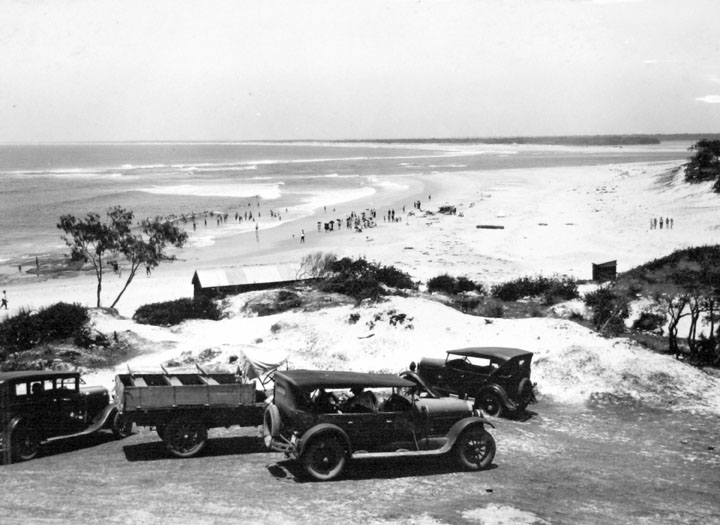
Bribie Island and entrance to Pumicestone Channel Caloundra 1930

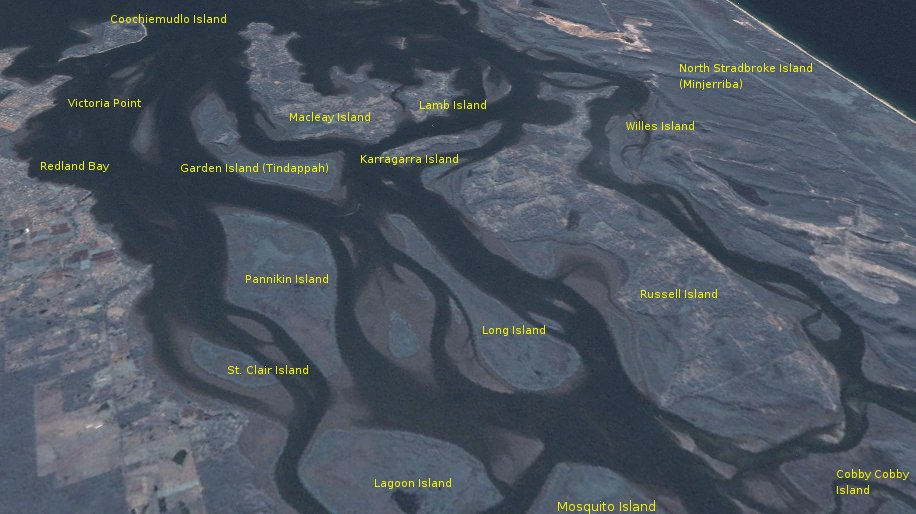
The islands of southern Moreton Bay

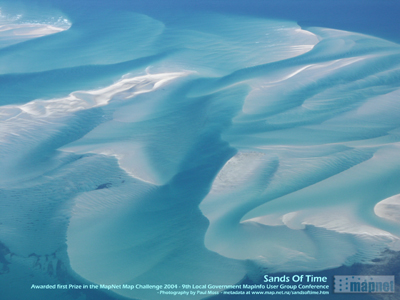
Sandbanks in Moreton Bay

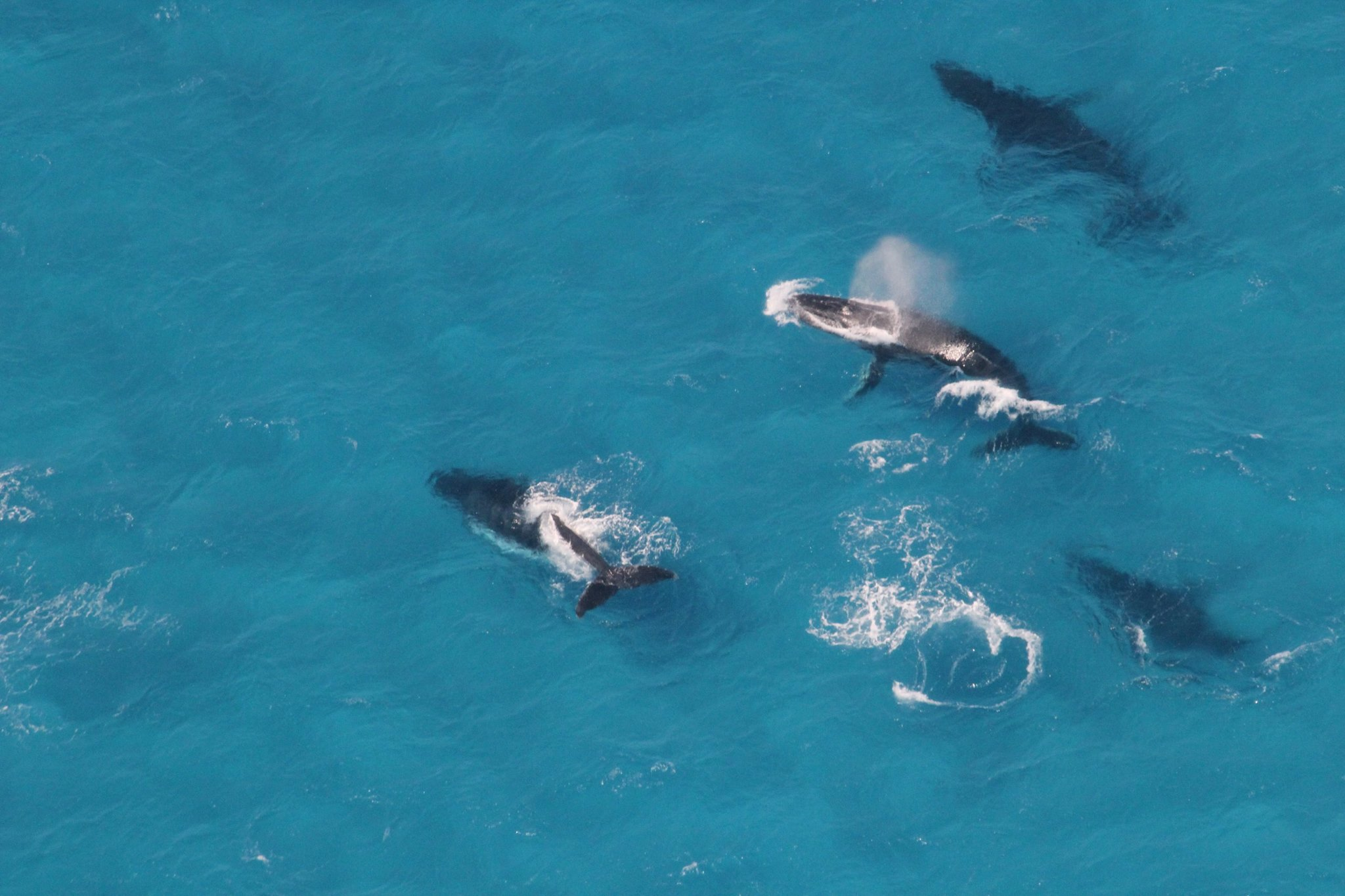
Humpback whales in Moreton Bay

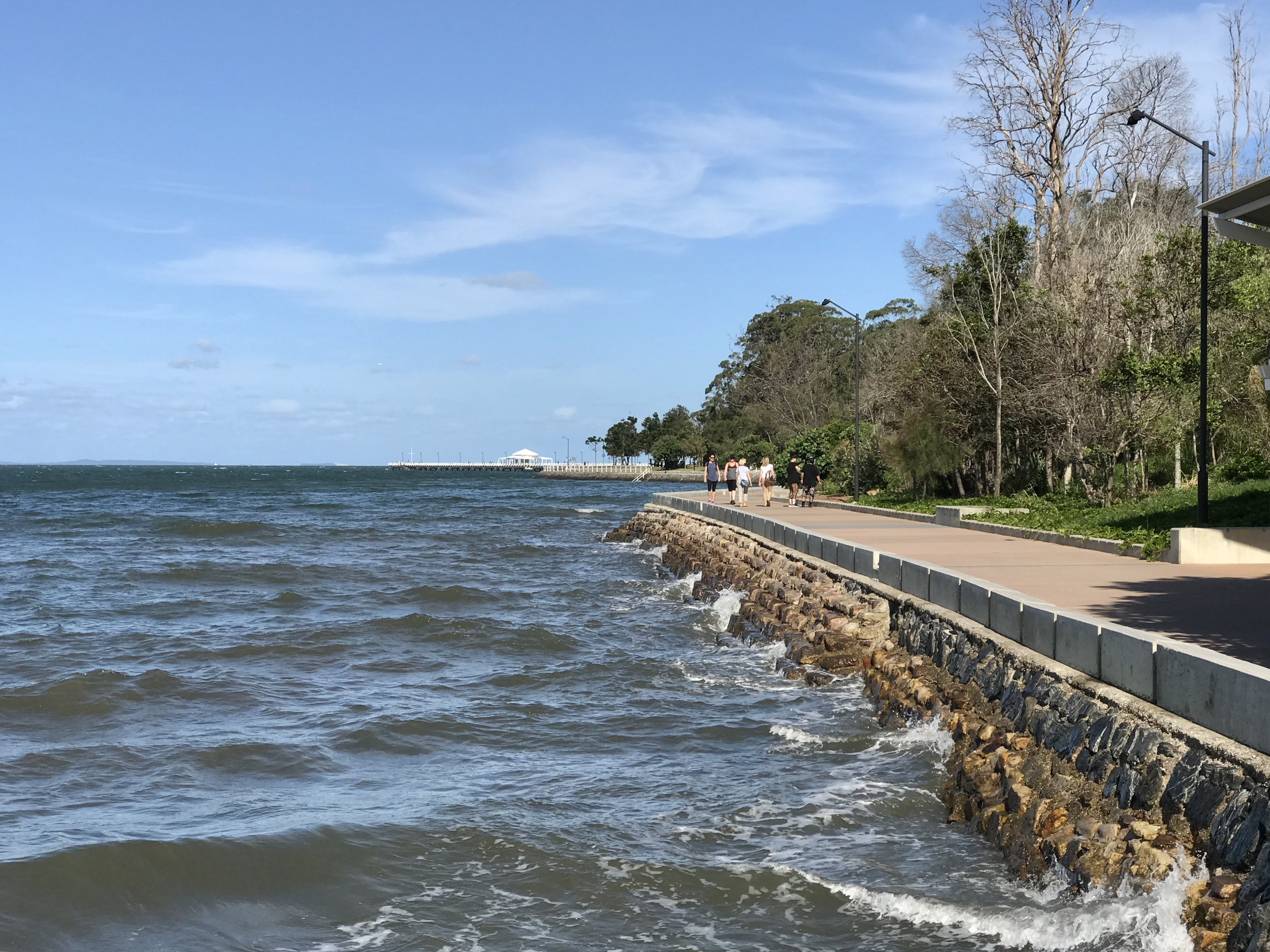
Lovers Walk and Shorncliffe pier at Shorncliffe

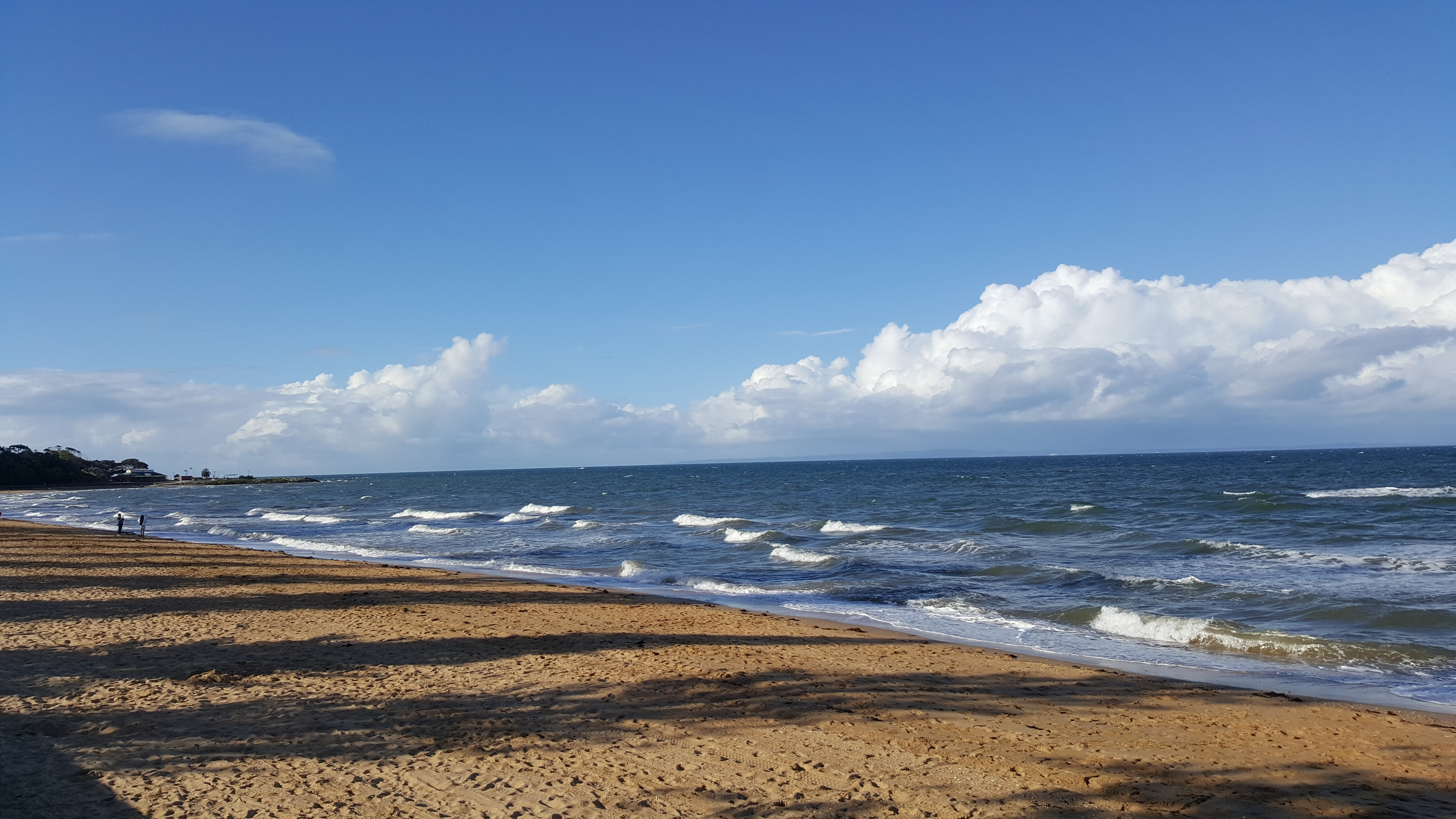
Suttons Beach at Redcliffe

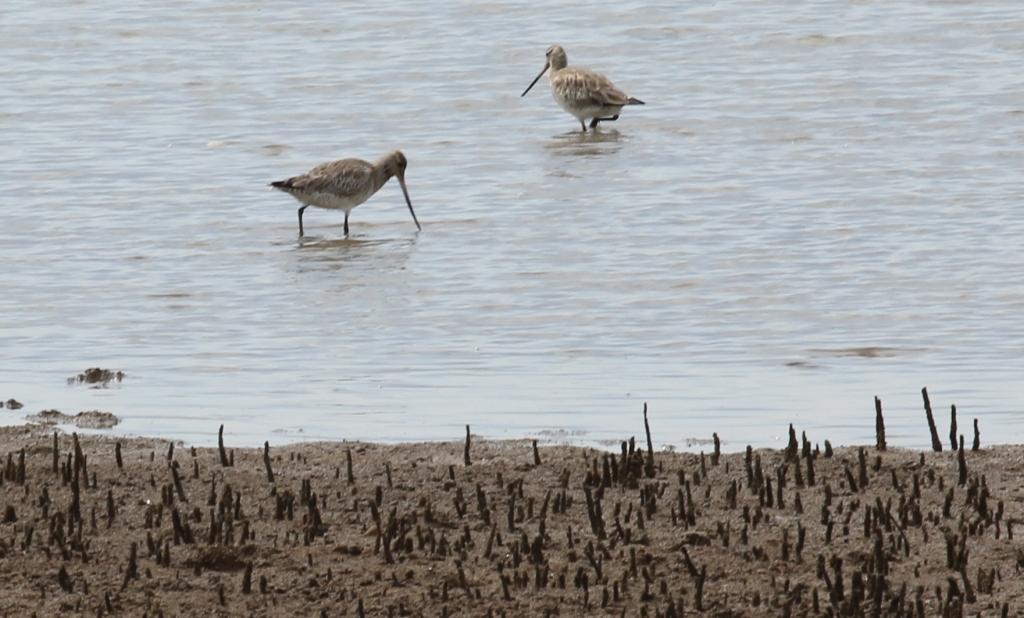
Godwits feeding on Cleveland foreshore in area proposed for marina development

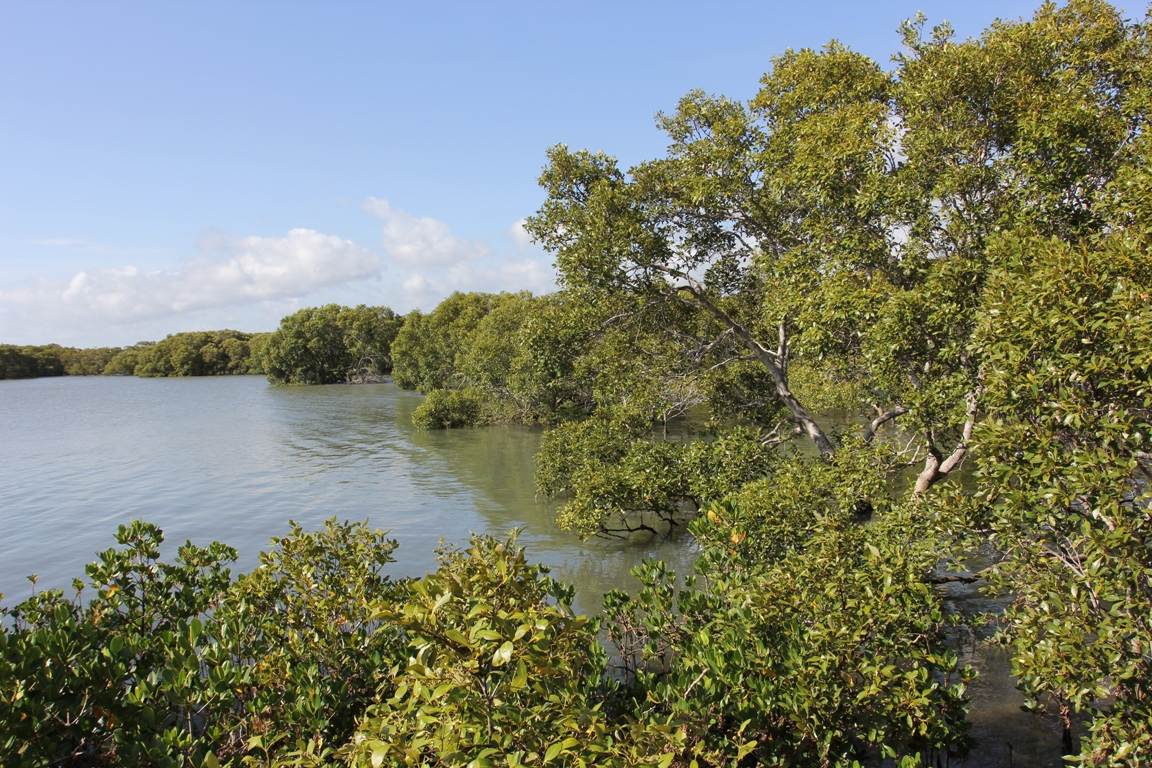
Mangroves, Toondah Harbour, Cleveland

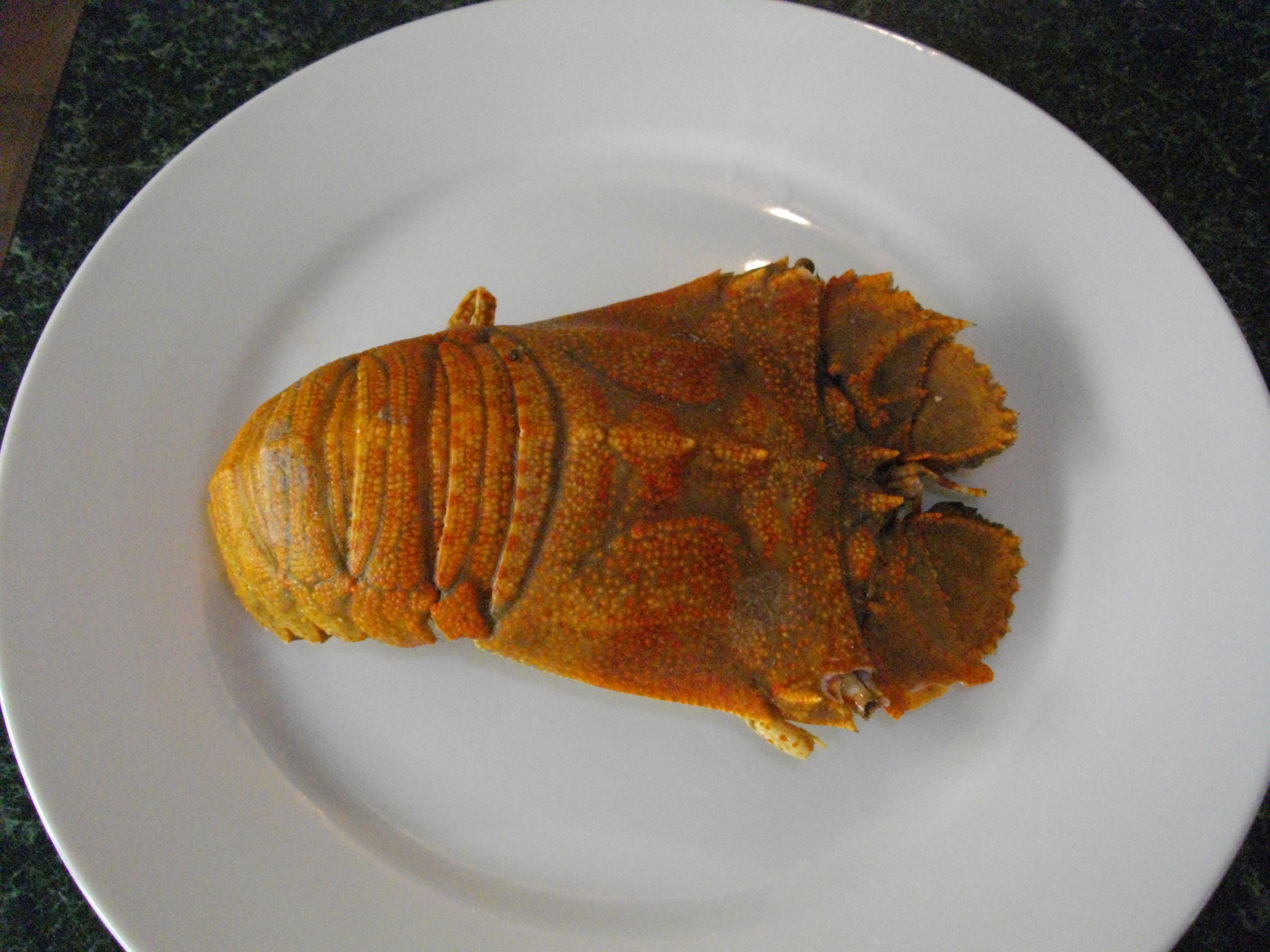
Cooked whole Moreton Bay bug (a type of slipper lobster)

A grey-tailed tattler feeding on the shoreline in Redcliffe, SE Queensland, Australia

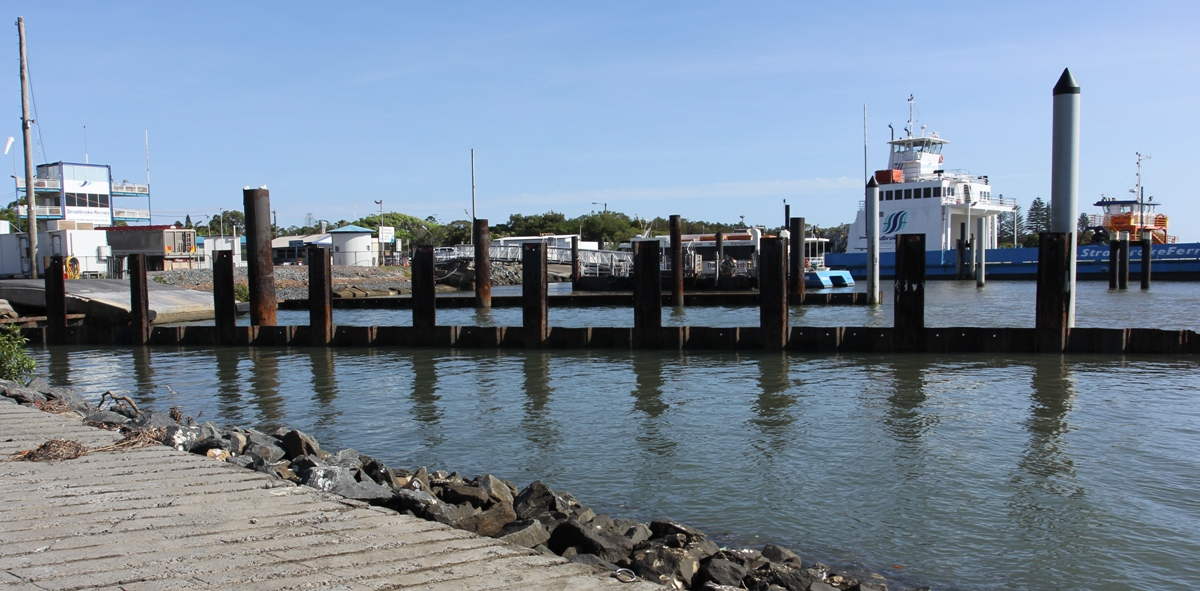
Toondah Harbour, Cleveland

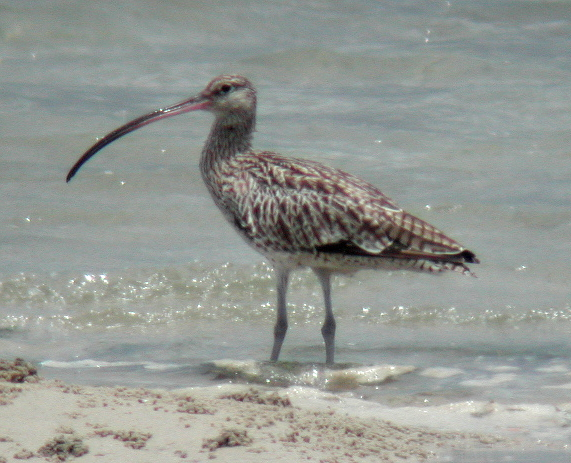
Eastern curlew

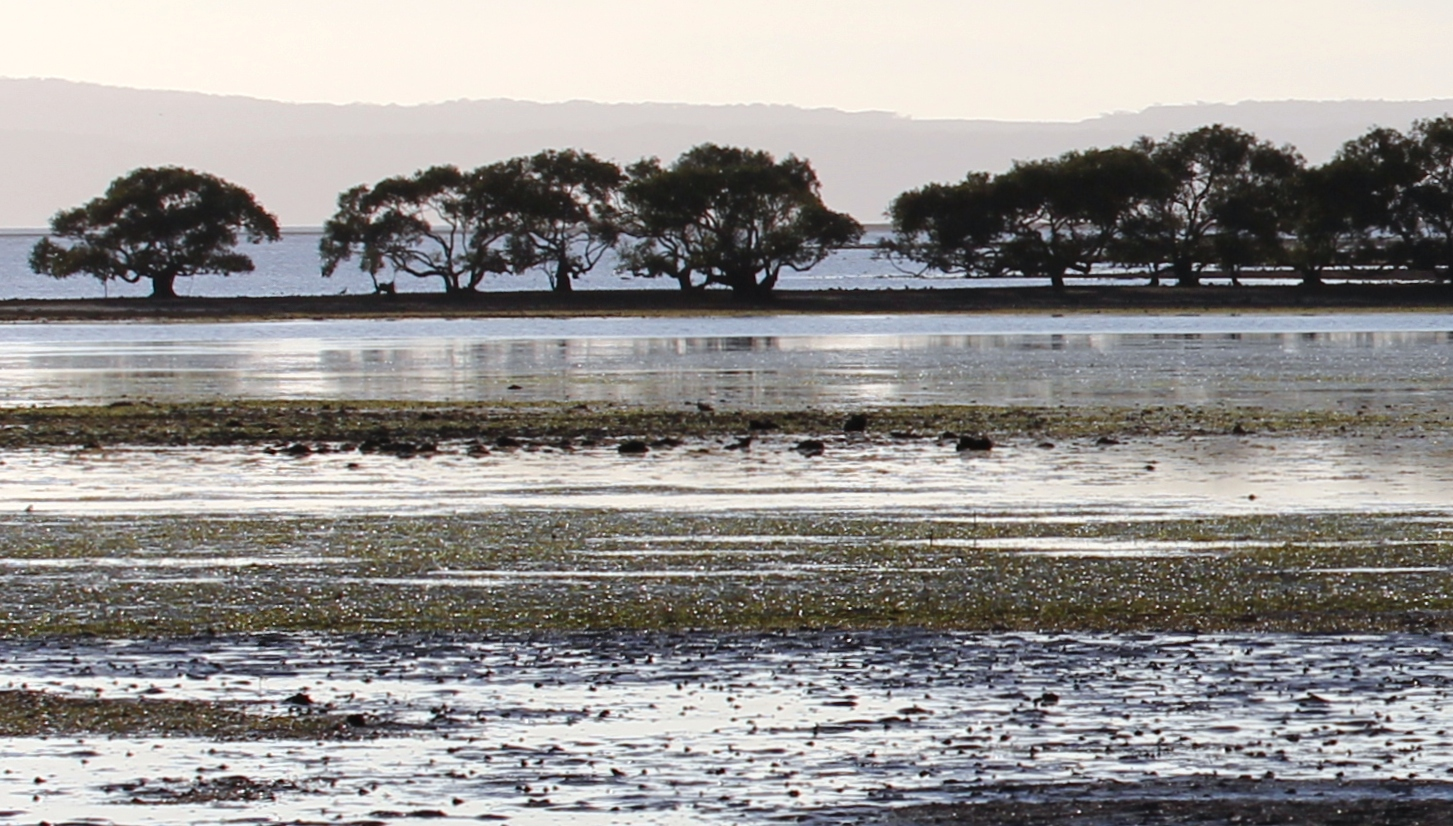
Cassim Island viewed from G.J. Walter Park, Cleveland

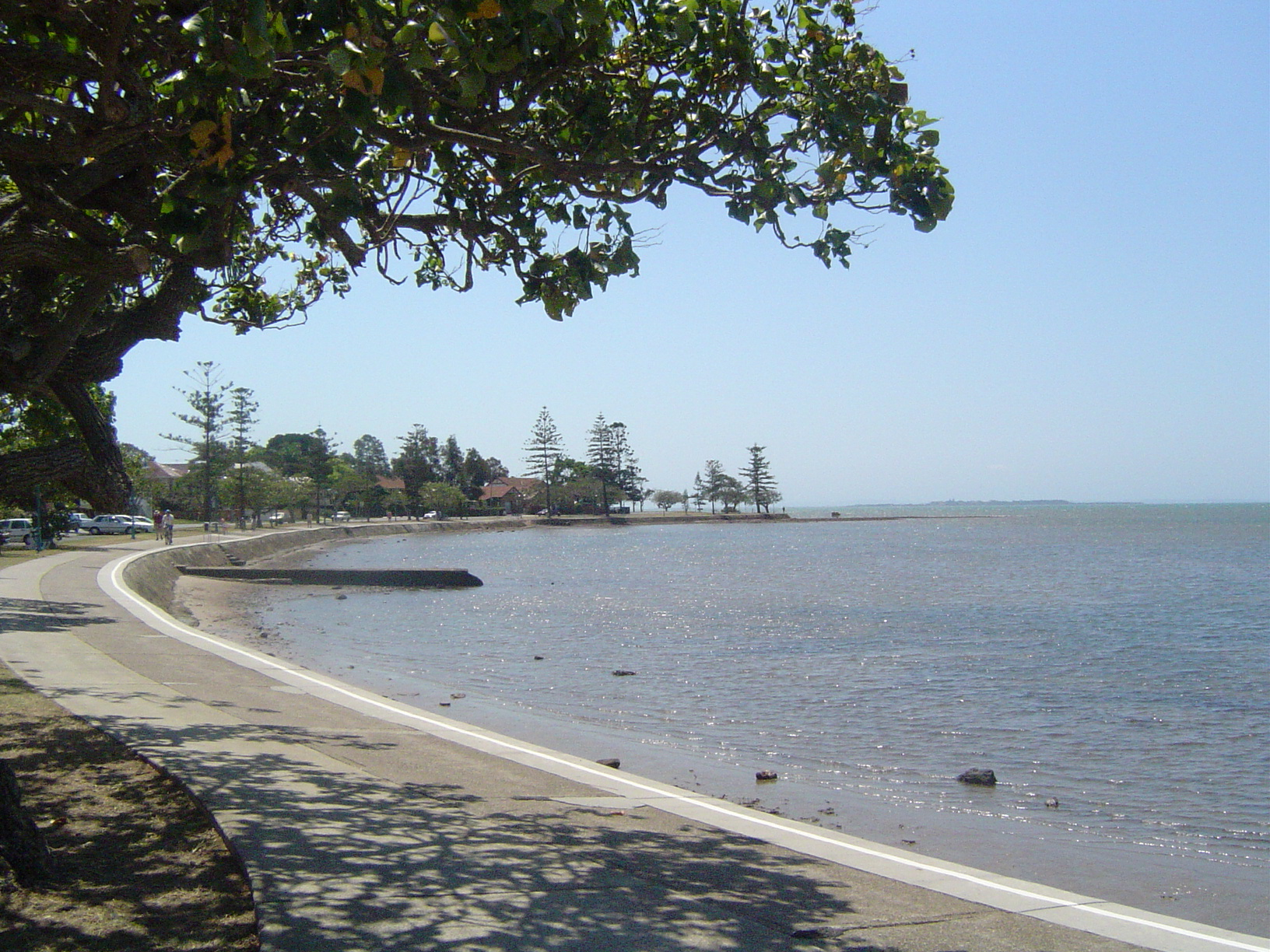
The foreshore at Manly, 2004

The name Morton's Bay was given by Captain Cook when he passed the area on 15 May 1770, honouring Lord Morton, president of the Royal Society. The spelling Moreton was an error in the first published account of Cook's voyage (Hawkesworth's Voyages). Cook gave the name only to the bight formed by the northern end of Stradbroke Island (in 1770, there was only one island) and the eastern side of Moreton Island. He was unaware of the South Passage (as it's now called) between the two islands, and did not sail into what is the present Moreton Bay.

Matthew Flinders was the first recorded European to enter the bay in 1799, touching down at the Pumicestone Passage, Redcliffe and Coochiemudlo Island. He was followed by John Oxley, who explored the Brisbane River in 1823. On a visit in the following year Oxley established the first European settlement in the bay at the present site of Redcliffe.

After Oxley in 1823 came convicts and soldiers. As the South Passage between Moreton and Stradbroke Islands was the shortest shipping route, a depot and pilot station were established at Amity Point in 1825.

European settlement began in earnest after the abandonment of the Redcliffe settlement, and work began on the new convict settlement several miles up the Brisbane River in 1825. Within a couple years, this new settlement was growing rapidly and the number of ships entering the bay was increasing. As a result, the facilities required to service the pilot station at Amity grew, and in 1827 convicts were sent to the island to build a new causeway at Dunwich, remnants of which can still be found on the same site. Within a year the first permanent European settlement at Dunwich had been built. Due to poor weather, smuggling, and conflict with aborigines this convict out-station was difficult to sustain and was closed in 1831.

The first immigrant ship from England, the Artemisia, reached Moreton Bay in December 1848 after a four-month journey. The next year saw the arrival of the Fortitude carrying more free immigrants to the settlement.

By the 1850s the region's earliest industry used the bay for the transport of timber. After felling, the logs were dragged or rolled into flooded streams from where they were washed downstream to tidal reaches and bound together into rafts. After the floods had ceased and tides returned to normal, the currents of the bay and sometimes boats were used to delivered the timber north to the Brisbane River or to Dunwich for shipment to Sydney.

The bay was home to the Lightship Rose which provided a permanent navigation aid to passing ships at the mouth of the Brisbane River. The SS John Oxley was another notable boat which temporarily acted as a pilot ship.

Car ferries began crossing the bay to reach North Stradbroke Island in 1947, leading to an increase in tourism on the island. In the 1950s both sand mining and the first land sales at Point Lookout occurred.

On 1 September 2007 four people were killed in a boat accident on the bay, two kilometres from the Pinkenba boat ramp. Ten others were injured.

Moreton Bay has at least 102 shipwrecks of which 26 have their exact location known.

=== European contact with local Indigenous people ===
Problems came about when the newcomers displayed a lack of respect for Aboriginal marriage rules, stole bones and other artefacts, and desecrated sites important to the Aboriginals.

In 1843 Catholic missionaries chose Dunwich as the site for the first Catholic mission to Australian Aborigines. The existence of the quarantine station on Stradbroke Island from 1850 to the 1870s led to the official discouragement of pastoralism or wider settlement for fear of spreading disease.

Thus the European usage and occupation of Quandamooka in the 19th century was largely restricted to government institutions on small portions on the islands, and with free enterprise business men like the Campbell brothers who ran a saltworks and sugar plantations on Russell and Macleay islands, and the early fishing and oystering businesses in the bay who employed the Aboriginal people of Quandamooka.

Large Aboriginal campsites remained throughout the Moreton Bay region, including on the mainland, until as late as the 1920s.

== Geography and natural history ==
The bay extends some 125 kilometres (78 mi) from Caloundra in the north almost to Surfers Paradise in the south. The bay's southern navigation entrance is the Gold Coast Seaway. The bay is 35 kilometres (22 mi) across at its widest point.

It is separated from the Coral Sea by a chain of three sand islands: Moreton Island in the north, North Stradbroke Island, and South Stradbroke Island in the south. Tipplers Passage is the main channel on the western coast of South Stradbroke Island. The Gold Coast Seaway is at the southern extent of Moreton Bay, before the Gold Coast Broadwater.

The bay itself contains around 360 islands in total. This includes the populated Russell, Macleay, Lamb and Karragarra Islands collectively known as the Southern Moreton Bay Islands. Together with Coochiemudlo and Garden Island these are bedrock islands. Residential development has also occurred on Coochiemudlo Island and Bribie Island. In the past Peel Island has been used as a sisal plantation, quarantine station, asylum and a leper colony.

Moreton Bay is generally shallow and sandy, though a substantive channel is maintained to allow access to the Port of Brisbane at Fisherman Islands at the mouth of the Brisbane River, for international shipping. Channels in the south of the bay are only rarely deep. Waves penetrate a small way into the bay at its four southern passages. Most waves in the bay are generated by local winds. The tidal range is moderate at 1.5–2 metres (4 ft 11 in – 6 ft 7 in) in range. Moreton Bay has an average depth of 6.8 metres (22 ft), however parts of the bay are deeper than 30 metres (98 ft). This relatively shallow depth lets light filter through to the seafloor, allowing an array of marine plants to grow which support a diverse range of fauna. The bay itself covers 1,523 square kilometres (588 sq mi) and has a catchment area 14 times larger, covering 21,220 square kilometres (8,190 sq mi). The waters of the bay are mostly blue in colour. Western parts of the bay are sometimes tinted green from algae, brown from suspended sediments or yellow-brown from humic runoff. The average annual temperature of the sea ranges from 21.0 °C (69.8 °F) in July to 27.0 °C (80.6 °F) in February.

As well as the Brisbane River, the Pimpama River, Logan River, Albert River, Pine River, Tingalpa Creek and the Schulz Canal all empty into Moreton Bay. Within Moreton Bay are the smaller bays of Waterloo Bay, Redland Bay, Raby Bay, Deception Bay and Bramble Bay.

The bay contains a number of island villages such as the settlement on the bayside of Moreton Island, Tangalooma and on North Stradbroke, Dunwich and Amity Point. Prominent coastal communities and mainland suburbs situated on the bay include Deception Bay, Scarborough, Redcliffe, Margate, Woody Point, Brighton, Sandgate, Cleveland, Victoria Point and Redland Bay. Other attractions in the bay include Pumicestone Passage and numerous boat ramps, marinas and jetties, including the Shorncliffe pier.

=== Sandbanks ===
Moreton Bay is filled with sandbanks from sand supplied via littoral drift along the coast of Moreton Island. The field of sandbanks extends across the entrance to Moreton Bay and evolved after sea level reached its present position, about 6,500 years ago after the last ice age Between Tangalooma and Skirmish Point on Bribie Island are the Middle Banks, Central Banks and Western Banks. From north of Moreton Island towards Caloundra are the Yulle Road, Spitfire Bank, and the Salamander Bank, amongst others.

Amity Banks are found just west of Amity Point, while the Moreton Banks lie to the west of the southern tip of Moreton Island. These banks can be hazard for marine navigation because they are constantly changing due to tidal currents.

The Middle Banks area close to Moreton Island has been used in the past as a source of sand for large projects such as the nearby Brisbane Airport and port facilities. Past dredging has removed 18 million metres^{3} and the removal of another 40 million metres^{3} is planned. Future sand extraction is expected to aid a major shipping channel straightening project.

To ensure the shipping channel remains open, several areas of the bay have been allocated for dredged material dumping sites. These sites have been selected to provide beach nourishment, aiding the natural long shore transport of sand along ocean beaches.

=== Flora and fauna ===
The bay's heritage protected wetlands, mudflats, and waterways are some of the healthiest in the region, supporting seasonally up to 25% of Australia's bird species. The combination of muddy habitats on the western side of the bay and sandy habitats on the eastern side of the bay together with coral and seagrass beds support more than 43 species of shorebird. Seven species of seagrass live in Moreton Bay. Zostera capricorni is the most common species. Seagrass has been lost since colonization due to increased turbidity and sedimentation from erosion in the catchment.

Collectively, around 50,000 wading birds visit the Moreton Bay each year, and its wetlands are classified by BirdLife International as an Important Bird Area (IBA). In its Shorebird Management Strategy, the Queensland Government notes that: "Moreton Bay's extensive intertidal areas are essential for shorebirds as they provide roosting, feeding and, in some cases, breeding habitat."

The bay is also home to other abundant wildlife, including whales, dolphins, dugong, sharks, and turtles. From 1824 to 1950 turtles were hunted for commercial purposes. The loggerhead turtle population in the bay is the most significant in the country.

The bay is ranked among the top ten dugong habitats in Australia and together with the Gulf of Carpentaria and Torres Strait is considered one of the most important areas for dugong in Queensland. Moreton Bay is the only place in Australia where dugongs gather in herds. In the past the dugongs in herds numbered in the thousands. Some herds 5 km long by 250 m wide were seen during the 1800s. In 2009, there were just between 600 and 800 remaining. The dugongs were traditional foods of indigenous Australians. They were hunted for their oil and to make other products by early Europeans up until the 1920s.

Many whale and dolphin species can be found in Moreton Bay including humpback whales, killer whales, southern right whales, sperm whales, melon-headed whales, blue whales, Bryde's whales, minke whales, common dolphins, spinner dolphins and Risso's dolphins. Under Australia's EPBC Act the southern right whale is listed as endangered and the humpback whale is listed as vulnerable. Commercial tour operators offer whale watching cruises between June and September each year. Most of larger cetaceans observed in the bay are humpbacks, and several smaller dolphins live or regularly visit the bay.

The Moreton Bay bug (Thenus orientalis) is a species of slipper lobster found throughout the waters of Australia's north coast. The bug is a relatively expensive delicacy served in many restaurants in Queensland.

The Moreton Bay fig (Ficus macrophylla) is a large tree endemic to the east coast of Australia in a range centred on the shores and surrounds of Moreton Bay.

The southern and western parts of the bay contain shallow mud-layered waters that are protected from strong wave action by the barrier islands. This has provided excellent habitat for mangroves of which seven different species thrive within the bay, particularly in the sheltered, southern sections of the bay. The species Avicennia marina predominates.

About 1% of the bay is coral reef. Land clearing and settlement in the catchment has led to unfavourable conditions for coral growth. Climate change is expected to raise sea levels and produce warmer waters that will aid coral growth in the bay.

The bay may experience widespread outbreaks of bacteria lyngbya which can cause skin lesions and asthma attacks upon contact.

The eastern shovelnose ray is found in high abundance in Moreton Bay and has an important role in the trophic structure of the area.

=== Ship strikes to marine megafauna ===
One of serious threats to marine animals in Moreton Bay is ship-strikes. Dugongs and turtles in Moreton Bay are often killed or injured when struck by speeding boats.

==== Southern right whales ====
Unlike the southern and south-western population of Australia, southern right whales off the east coast of Australia, along with the west coast, Tasmania, and eastern Victoria, are critically endangered, consisting of only 10 or more individuals. Whales have not been seen on the east coast for many years (unlike humpbacks) as the first whale came back to both Australia and New Zealand in the early 1960s, largely due to mass illegal hunts by the Soviet Union as well as Japan, although at first it was reported to take only four whales.

Recent increases in sightings along the east coast indicate very slow but certain recovery of the species in that area, and Moreton Bay was probably a prominent calving ground for these coast-loving whales. Very small but steady appearances of southern rights have been confirmed in Moreton Bay, Gold Coast, and Hervey Bay. Seasonal presences of right whales have been recorded in Moreton Bay at least in the late 1990s, and small family groups of whales have been observed visiting the southern bay each year since 2002, especially around Toondah Harbour.

However, there was an instance of a southern right whale being fatally struck by a ferry in August 2014. This whale was a calf, and her mother was also seriously injured by the accident and her fate is still unknown. Another southern right whale, possibly with a calf was also hit few days prior to the incident with a sighting of possibly the same whales near Victoria Point. These ship-strikes and entanglements in fishing gear may contribute severely to preventing the future re-establishment of the species in the former habitats.

== Environment ==
=== Environmental threats ===
Moreton Bay's sea grass beds and corals are subject to ongoing threat from soil run-off caused by agriculture in the Lockyer Valley and construction activity in south east Queensland. Professor John Olley has noted that mud is now flowing out to Moreton Bay 10 times as fast as it did before Europeans settled in the region 120 years ago. The 2013 Healthy Waterways Report shows a downward trend in the ecosystem health of Moreton Bay over the period from 2012 to 2013, with water quality also affected by major flood events such as those in 2009 and 2011.

After the 2011 Brisbane River floods washed contaminated water into the bay, commercial fishermen and recreation anglers were warned not catch or eat seafood from its waters. The flood plume was investigated to monitor its impact on the bay's marine ecosystems. It contained sewerage, pesticides, heavy metals such as lead and zinc as well as hydrocarbons.

An oil spill occurred in March 2009 from the MV Pacific Adventurer dumping 100 tonnes (98 long tons; 110 short tons) of oil, 30 tonnes (30 long tons; 33 short tons) of fuel and other toxic chemicals on Brisbane's suburban beaches. Premier Anna Bligh described the spill as the "worst environmental disaster Queensland has ever seen".

On 2 November 2012 the Queensland government announced that in conjunction with the Gold Coast City Council it would call expressions of interest to develop an international cruise ship terminal and associated development for the Southport Broadwater at the southern end of Moreton Bay. On 13 February 2014 the Government announced that the ASF Consortium's proposal "has demonstrated a cruise ship terminal is a possibility that could be further developed, should the Council and the proponent choose to progress it". This project is opposed by the Gold Coast and Hinterland Environment Council.

On 31 May 2014 an approved development scheme was released for the Toondah Harbour Priority Development Area in Cleveland which would allow development of a large marina up to 400 berths in southern Moreton Bay between Toondah Harbour, G.J. Walter Park and Cassim Island. The Queensland Government released at the same time a lengthy report on the 583 submissions received in response to a draft scheme released for consultation in January 2014. The draft Toondah scheme was opposed by marine planning experts and various environmentally concerned community groups including the Bay Wilderness Society. On 4 March 2014 a petition with 1,211 signatures calling for the Government's plans to be withdrawn was tabled in the Queensland Parliament.

=== Federal government protection ===
In 1993 large areas of Moreton Bay with a total area exceeding 113,000 hectares (280,000 acres) were recognised as wetlands of international significance under the Ramsar Wetland Convention 1971. Listing as a Ramsar site is justified on many grounds including:

- Moreton Bay supports large numbers of the nationally threatened green turtle, Hawksbill turtle and Loggerhead turtle.
- The site is ranked among the top ten habitats in Queensland for the internationally vulnerable dugong and is a foraging and breeding ground for the dugong.
- The Moreton Bay Ramsar site supports 55 species of algae associated with mangroves, seven species of mangrove and seven species of seagrass.
- At least 43 species of shorebirds use intertidal habitats in the bay, including 30 migratory species listed by international migratory bird conservation agreements.
- The Moreton Bay Ramsar site supports more than 50,000 wintering and staging shorebirds during the non-breeding season.
- The Moreton Bay Ramsar site regularly supports more than 1% of the population the wintering eastern curlews and the grey-tailed tattler.

Many of the migratory shorebirds which use the bay as part of the East Asian–Australasian Flyway are protected in accordance with three bilateral agreements:

- Japan–Australia Migratory Bird Agreement (JAMBA)
- China–Australia Migratory Bird Agreement (CAMBA)
- Republic of Korea–Australia Migratory Bird Agreement (ROKAMBA)

Actions that have a significant impact on a Ramsar listed site or on species which are the subject of international bird migratory agreements are "matters of national environmental significance" which are protected by the Federal Government in accordance with provisions of the Environment Protection and Biodiversity Conservation Act 1999.

=== Queensland government protection ===
Moreton Island is protected as Moreton Island National Park. The bay itself contains St Helena Island National Park and the Moreton Bay Marine Park with areas designated under the Marine Park Zoning Plan. The Marine Park was declared in 1993 and covers 3,400 square kilometres. Parts of the bay are also protected under the Southern Moreton Bay Islands National Park.

The bay's marine park zoning plan was renewed in 2008. Despite angst from both commercial and recreational fishers, draft Queensland Government plans indicate further fishing restrictions aiming to protect more than 15% of important marine and coastal environments. Artificial reefs could be placed in Moreton Bay to ease the concerns of fishermen who fear they are being forced out. The Queensland Government will spend A$1 million on research, planning and construction of a new concrete reef in the bay.

To make up for the fishing areas lost to the 2009 expansion of the Moreton Bay Marine Park, the Queensland Government agreed to create a total of six artificial reefs for anglers. The reefs are constructed from specially designed balls of concrete which will provide habitat for fish species. According to former Sustainability Minister Andrew McNamara the bay produces a commercial catch valued at $25 million and that $4 million worth of this figure has become off-limits with the rezoning.

In March 2012 the Queensland Government signalled its intention to allow recreational anglers back into marine park green zones in parts of Moreton Bay. Mark Robinson, the Government's fishing spokesman, was quoted as saying: "Any changes we make would be evidence-based". On 31 January 2014 the Queensland Government announced a proposed change to marine park zoning that would relax fishing restrictions at Scotts Point on the Redcliffe Peninsula. This policy change was criticised by the Australian Marine Conservation Society whose spokesperson said: "We question why Premier Newman is going against the science and the rigorously surveyed opinions of local recreational fishers to adopt a proposal that was being pushed by disgraced former MP Scott Driscoll whilst he was still the member for Redcliffe. There was no scientific process behind this decision".

In May 2014 the Queensland Government announced that MRAG Asia Pacific had been engaged to review fishing management in Queensland. MRAG has stated that while the green zones were not formally part of the review scope, it is likely that they would be discussed in the review team's report.

== Economic aspects ==
The economic value of recreational fishing in Moreton Bay has been estimated at approximately $20 million per year.

== Recreation ==
The bay is popular with recreational anglers. The Moreton Bay Classic fishing competition is held annually from the Manly foreshore. There is a fishing spot near the shipwreck of Mount Elliot.

There are many sailing events held on Moreton Bay including:

- Yacht and dinghy racing organised by the Royal Queensland Yacht Squadron at Manly.
- The Brisbane to Gladstone yacht race, first staged in 1949, which starts from near the Shorncliff Pier every year on Good Friday.
- The Interclub Bay Cruise held each year in the first week of the Queensland September school holidays.

The bay is home to many other watersports and activities including kayaking, jet-skiing, windsurfing and water-skiing. Diving and snorkelling are popular around Tangalooma on Moreton Island.

== See also ==
- Moreton Bay Pile Light
- Moreton Bay, a song
