= Buddhist Retreat Centre =

Religion
- Affiliation: Buddhist

Location
- Location: Ixopo (Harry Gwala District Municipality), KwaZulu Natal, South Africa
- Country: South Africa

Architecture
- Architect: Louis Van Loon
- Creator: Louis Van Loon
- Groundbreaking: 1976

Website
- www.brcixopo.co.za

The Buddhist Retreat Centre is an inclusive retreat and meditation centre located near Ixopo, in KwaZulu-Natal Province, South Africa. Since opening in 1980, the BRC has provided a tranquil space amid 300 acres of rolling hills and supported the development of the Buddhist community throughout the country, without promoting any one form of Buddhism over others. The BRC hosts retreats on weekends and mid-week and welcomes self-retreatants and day visitors who want to visit the centre. The BRC has received recognition for the quality of its vegetarian cuisine, which it has recorded in three popular cookbooks.

== History ==
The BRC was founded by Louis van Loon, a Dutch-born architect and civil engineer who immigrated to South Africa in 1956. After establishing himself professionally in Durban, van Loon explored his interest in philosophy, starting with theosophy, a religion established in the late 19th century that draws on Hindu and Buddhist principles. Van Loon further developed his interest on trips to Asia, where he learned more about Buddhism.

Additional trips and pilgrimages to Buddhist communities in Sri Lanka and Tibet followed and van Loon developed his meditation practice. He became a spokesperson for the fledgling Buddhist community in Durban and lectured on Buddhism at the University of Durban-Westville and Cape Town University. After a nearly fatal illness while traveling in Sri Lanka, van Loon made a commitment to establish a retreat centre similar to the ones he had visited in Asia.

In 1970, van Loon purchased the land for the BRC, nearly site unseen, which at the time was derelict farmland and described it as "wild wattle wilderness". Construction began in 1976. Construction of the meditation hall was completed first, followed by accommodations. The foundation stone for the property was placed at what became the Stupa, at a location indicated by Lama Anagarika Govinda. The first retreats were held in March 1980.

Antony Osler, who van Loon selected for his wide knowledge of the different schools of Buddhism, became the BRC's first resident teacher. Early retreat activities were very zen-focused, though, throughout the 1980s, the range of topics explored at the BRC expanded to include workshops ranging from Classical Indian Dance and Taoism to tai chi. The role of a full-time teacher was eventually abandoned, and van Loon facilitated many of the retreats, while local and international teachers were invited to offer retreats on a broad range of topics.

The BRC continued to foster the development of the Buddhist community of South Africa and became known as the "kindergarten", a term coined by van Loon, to convey its role in supporting the development of other similar retreats around the country, and the accessibility of the BRC to all forms of Buddhism, and to those who do not yet have a deep understanding of Buddhist principles.

In 1996, the BRC expanded further through a land swap with a timber company. The grounds, which were once extensively covered in wattle, were extended to the nearest road.

== Facilities ==
The 300 acres (120 ha) of the BRC include a large teaching studio, an extensive library, a meditation hall or Gompa/Zendo, and a kitchen and dining room. Its accommodations include a lodge with shared ablutions and a variety of single and double en-suite rooms that can accommodate 54 retreatants. The centre piece is a 5-meter-tall Buddha statue on the main lawn, designed by van Loon and hailed as the largest Buddhist statue outside of a Buddhist country. On the grounds are also a stupa, Buddha boma/outdoor pavilion for meditation, a labyrinth, Zen gardens, a Buddhist shrine and a Circle of Sound.

The BRC has significant biodiversity, including 165 species of birds. It was designated a National Heritage Site by Nelson Mandela due to its conservation of the highly endangered blue swallow and indigenous trees. The centre has been a regular nesting site for two out of less than 40 known breeding pairs of blue swallows. Small mammal species, including vervet monkeys, reedbuck, and duiker, can also be found on the centre grounds.

== Operations ==
The BRC hosts a wide variety of retreats on weekends and mid-week, with teachers from South Africa and internationally. It also welcomes self-retreatants and day visitors who want to visit the centre. Earlier retreats included lectures on the conditions of Tibet under Chinese occupation or “the radiant awareness of being” or making and flying a kite. The birding weekend is noted for its popularity. Some retreats are held in Noble Silence.

The BRC is maintained by a full-time staff of local people and volunteers. Van Loon's wife, Chrisi, plays an important role in the day-to-day operations. Consistent with Buddhist tradition, teachers do not receive payment for their teachings but are funded by Dana contributions.

=== Food ===
The BRC is known for the exceptional quality of its food. Van Loon emphasized the importance of good food at the BRC, as many of the retreats he had visited had such lousy food that it made visitors want to abandon vegetarianism. The retreat centre has a kitchen, run by local staff.

The BRC has published three best-selling vegetarian cookbooks. Quiet Food (2005), The Cake the Buddha Ate (2011) and Plentiful: The Big Book of Buddha Food (2016). Van Loon contributes reflections on his travels and studies to the books, along with recipes from visiting chefs and pictures of meal preparation in the kitchen.
