= Banco Rugby Club =

Argentinian rugby union club, based in Buena Nueva

(Argentina) Banco
- Full name: Banco Rugby Club
- Union: Unión de Rugby de Cuyo
- Founded: November 21, 1992; 33 years ago
- Location: Guaymallén, Mendoza Province, Argentina
- Ground: Guaymallén
- Chairman: Fernando Gil Posleman
- League: Top 10
- 2025: 4th.
Team kit

Banco Rugby Club is an Argentine rugby union club headquartered in the city of Buena Nueva in the Guaymallén Department of Mendoza Province. The team is member of the Unión de Rugby de Cuyo and formerly played in the Torneo del Oeste league.

The club was founded in 1992 by a group of enthusiasts of the game. Club Banco Nación supported the creation of a team, so the recently created club took its name and colors as a tribute to the institution. Although women take part in many social activities at the club, they are not allowed to vote, so presidents can be elected only by male members.
