= Brisbane River Classic =

Annual fishing tournament

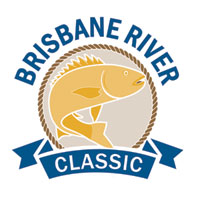
Brisbane River Classic logo

The Brisbane River Classic ('BRC') is a yearly fishing tournament held on the Brisbane River in Brisbane, Queensland, Australia. It is held usually in November or December each year and is the only fishing tournament to be held on the Brisbane River. The 2008 tournament saw the changing of the Longest Shark and Longest Catfish categories, into Photo and Release categories. The other categories are Longest Bream, Best Miscellaneous and Junior BRC (Best Miscellaneous). The 2009 tournament saw the introduction of a new category, Longest King Threadfin.

The tournament sparked debate in the 2007 Brisbane River Classic fishing tournament with the winning entry for the Heaviest Shark a record-sized 2.9m bull shark. It is believed that the shark was the largest caught in the river. It was weighed but the scales registered to only 200 kg and is estimated to have been 250 kg to 300 kg. The tournament has now introduced Photo and Release entry methods.

== BRC trophies and awards ==
Category	Trophy
Longest Bream	The Bream Shield
Junior BRC	The Junior Cup
Longest Catfish	The Catfish Cup
Longest Shark	The Golden Hook
Longest King Threadfin	Certificate
Best Miscellaneous Fish	The Golden Fish

== BRC results ==
Year	Longest Shark Category		
Year	1st	2nd	3rd
2005	TBA	TBA	TBA
2005	TBA	TBA	TBA
2006	The Bent Hookers	Not Awarded	Not Awarded
2006	TBA	TBA	TBA
2007	The Bent Hookers	Yellow Peril	Crack-A-Jack
2007	TBA	TBA	TBA
2008	The Bent Hooker	Rebel-T Fishing	James Wahry
2008	TBA	TBA	TBA
2009	Jason Baker	Baden Phillips	Not Awarded
2009	1400mm	785mm	-
2010	Shawn Labudda	Jason Baker	Not Awarded
2010	1450mm	1360mm	-

Year	Longest Bream Category		
Year	1st	2nd	3rd
2005	TBA	TBA	TBA
2005	TBA	TBA	TBA
2006	Team Water Scorpion	Lone Ranger	Pishing Fimps
2006	TBA	TBA	TBA
2007	Team Ridge	Bassmaster	Squid Jiggers
2007	TBA	TBA	TBA
2008	Garrett Graveson	Paul Graveson	Mal West
2008	TBA	TBA	TBA
2009	Tina Le	Mick Nash	Paul Graveson
2009	351mm	341mm	293mm
2010	Paul Graveson	Joel Farley	Patrick Kliese
2010	394mm	352mm	346mm

Year	Longest Catfish Category		
Year	1st	2nd	3rd
2005	TBA	TBA	TBA
2005	TBA	TBA	TBA
2006	Southern Chillys	Got Away	Got Away
2006	TBA	TBA	TBA
2007	Team Crusty Seamen	Severed Heads	Pishing Fimps
2007	TBA	TBA	TBA
2008	Team Scat	Kurt Stoddart	Rebel-T Fishing
2008	TBA	TBA	TBA
2009	Eugene Zhang	Mark Sheehan	Ian Ferguson
2009	626mm	613mm	608mm
2010	Edward Stevens	Declan Stevens (Junior)	Adam Hill
2010	585mm	533mm	395mm

Year	Junior BRC Category		
Year	1st	2nd	3rd
2005	TBA	TBA	TBA
2005	TBA	TBA	TBA
2006	Alex Kennedy	Not Awarded	Not Awarded
2006	TBA	TBA	TBA
2007	Alex Kennedy	Snapper King	Team Jaggers
2007	TBA	TBA	TBA
2008	Team Sluggett	Alex Kennedy	Not Awarded
2008	TBA	TBA	TBA
2009	Anthony Sluggett	Anthony Sluggett	Anthony Sluggett
2009	400mm Estuary Cod	370mm Flathead	283mm Bream
2010	Declan Stevens	Anthony Sluggett	Declan Stevens
2010	384mm Trevally	533mm Flathead	382mm Squire

Year	Longest King Threadfin Category		
Year	1st	2nd	3rd
2009	Jeff Flynn	Daniel Stephens	Mark Sheehan
2009	1075mm	1038mm	958mm
2010	Hunter Armytage	Hunter Armytage	Patrick Kliese
2010	1185mm	1060mm	713mm

Year	Best Miscellaneous Fish Category		
Year	1st	2nd	3rd
2005	TBA	TBA	TBA
2005	TBA	TBA	TBA
2006	Pishing Fimps	Got Away	Yellow
2006	TBA	TBA	TBA
2007	Southern Chillys	Team Anderson	Severed Heads
2007	TBA	TBA	TBA
2008	Old Furts	Average Joe's	Crapall
2008	TBA	TBA	TBA
2009	Paul Masinello	Denis Metzdorf	Franco Masinello
2009	645mm Snapper	662mm Flathead	610mm Estuary Cod
2010	Dave Coman	Paul Graveson	Garrett Graveson
2010	453mm Trevally	439mm Trevally	526mm Flathead
