= Moreton Bay, Queensland =

Moreton Bay
- Suburb
- Interactive map of Moreton Bay
- Coordinates: 27.29°S 153.2594°E
- Country: Australia
- State: Queensland
- LGAs: City of Brisbane; City of Redland

Government
  - State electorates: Redcliffe; Lytton; Oodgeroo; Redlands
  - Federal divisions: Bonner; Bowman

Population
  - Total: 0 (2021 census)
- Time zone: UTC+10:00 (AEST)
- Postcode: 4178

Moreton Bay is a locality split between the City of Brisbane and the City of Redland, both in Queensland, Australia. The locality includes all of the bay Moreton Bay (water and islands) between the mainland of the City of Brisbane and the City of Redland across to the western coast of Moreton Island and the western coast of North Stradbroke Island (including some islands but excluding others). In the 2021 census, Moreton Bay had "no people or a very low population".

== Geography ==
The extent of the locality within the City of Brisbane is:

- in the north-west, the northernmost coastal point of Brighton 27.281°S 153.067°E
- in the south-west, the southernmost coastal point of Lota 27.468°S 153.204°E
- in the north-east, the northwesternmost coastal point of Moreton Island 27.063°S 153.363°E
- in the south-east, the northwesternmost coastal point of North Stradbroke Island 27.389°S 153.449°E

and includes the following uninhabited islands (from north to south):

- Mud Island (Bungumba) 27.339°S 153.251°E
- St Helena Island (Noogoon) 27.389°S 153.234°E
- Green Island (Milwarpa) 27.425°S 153.234°E

The extent of the locality within the City of Redland is:

- in the north-west, the northernmost coastal point of Thorneside 27.468°S 153.204°E
- in the south-west, the southernmost coastal point of Redland Bay 27.699°S 153.325°E
- in the north-east, the northwesternmost coastal point of North Stradbroke Island 27.389°S 153.449°E
- in the south-east, the southwesternmost coastal point of North Stradbroke Island that is north of Russell Island (one of the excluded areas below 27.639°S 153.417°E

and includes the following uninhabited islands from north to south:

- Goat Island
- Cassim Island
- Snipe Island
- Garden Island
- Pannikin Island
- Long Island
- Lagoon Island
- Redbill Island

but excludes the following islands (some inhabited, some not), from north to south:

- Peel Island
- Coochiemudlo Island
- Macleay Island & Perulpa Island
- Lamb Island
- Karragarra Island
- Russell Island & Willes Island & Double Island

The list of excluded islands or island groups above are separate localities within the City of Redland, all are inhabited with the exception of Peel Island, which was formerly inhabited but now is a protected area.

== History ==
The locality name of Moreton Bay draws its name from the bay of the same name, which was named by Lieutenant James Cook, commander of HMS Endeavour, after James Douglas, 14th Earl of Morton, the President of the Royal Society who had helped to negotiate a grant of £4000 to finance the expedition.

== Demographics ==
In the 2016 census, Moreton Bay had "no people or a very low population".

In the 2021 census, Moreton Bay had "no people or a very low population".

== See also ==
- List of tramways in Queensland
