= Southern Moreton Bay Islands (Redland City) =

Nickname: SMBI, Bay Islands, or RKLM
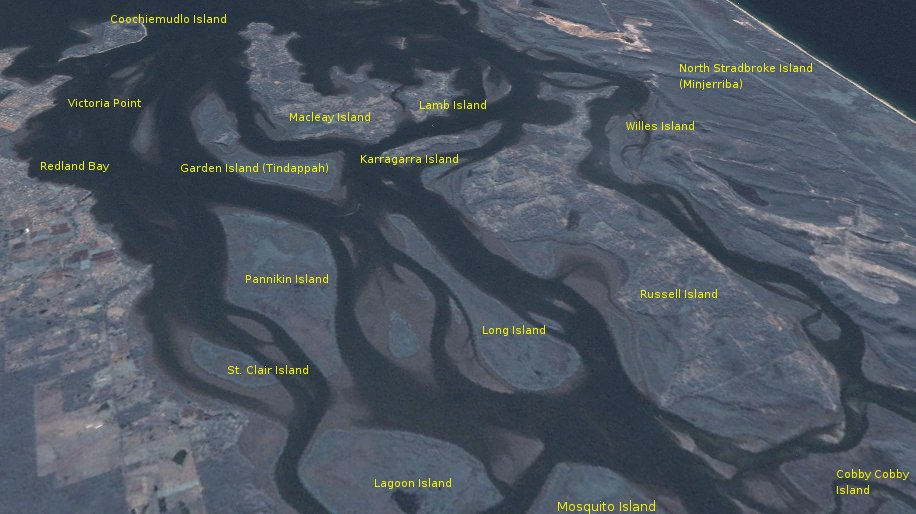
- A satellite view from the southwest of south Moreton Bay, Queensland. Labelled are the many islands created from the outflow of the Logan River behind the barrier of North and South Stradbroke Islands.

- Location within Queensland

Geography
- Location: Moreton Bay
- Coordinates: 27°38′S 153°23′E
- Major islands: Karragarra Island; Lamb Island; Russell Island; Macleay Island

Administration
- Australia
- State: Queensland
- Region: South East Queensland
- Local government area: Redland City

Demographics
- Population: 6,153 (2016 census)

The Southern Moreton Bay Islands, abbreviated as SMBI, also known as the Bay Islands, are the four inhabited southern Moreton Bay islands located in South East Queensland, Australia. The group is part of the Redland City with a permanent population of 7,635 as of the 2021 census (up from 6,153 in the 2016 census). However, nearly one-third of all dwellings on the islands were unoccupied, suggesting a high proportion of "second homes" that are owned by people who were elsewhere on the night of the census.

== Geography ==
Tiny Perulpa Island is joined by a causeway to Macleay and is generally regarded as part of Macleay.

The inhabited Southern Moreton Bay Islands are mostly surrounded by the Southern Moreton Bay Islands National Park, which is also located within Redland City.

== History ==
The population of the four inhabited Bay Islands in 2006:

- Karragarra, 125
- Lamb, 373
- Russell, 1,776
- Macleay, population 1,957

The population of the four inhabited Bay Islands in 2016:

- Karragarra, 204
- Lamb, 432
- Russell, 2,836
- Macleay, population 2,681

The population of the four inhabited Bay Islands in 2021:

- Karragarra, 240
- Lamb, 504
- Russell, 3,698
- Macleay, population 3,193

The Islands were very substantially subdivided into residential allotments in the early 1970s.

In the 1980s, there were various plans announced and withdrawn to construct a bridge between the mainland and North Stradbroke Island via Russell Island; these proposals were both expensive and controversial and no bridge was built. Residents are now feeling the pressure of transport to the mainland for some shopping trips, as mainland parking has become very scarce at the ferry and barge terminals.

== Heritage listings ==
Lamb Island has a number of heritage-listed sites, including:

- Lamb Island Pioneer Hall, Lucas Drive
- Mango Trees planted over 100 years ago, Tina Avenue
- Jetty Shed which has been restored by the local island community group and was used for loading local produce onto the merchant boats

Macleay Island has a number of heritage-listed sites, including:

- Industrial Ruins, Macleay Island, Cliff Terrace

== Transport ==
The islands have a frequent scheduled vehicle barge provided by Stradbroke Ferries and fast passenger ferries services provided by Bay Islands Transit, leaving from Redland Bay. Passenger services from Redland Bay to the islands were added to the Translink network in 2013, allowing passengers to use go cards to ride the ferries.

== Telecommunications ==
The National Broadband Network became available on the islands in June 2020, in both fibre to the curb and fibre to the node, depending on the street.

== See also ==
- List of islands of Queensland
