= Redland Museum =

Redlands Coast Museum
- The Redlands Coast Museum's exterior, viewed from the Cleveland Showgrounds, with the blacksmith shop on the left.
- Established: 1968
- Location: 60 Smith Street, Cleveland, Redland City, Queensland, Australia
- Coordinates: 27.534242°S 153.259663°E
- Type: Local museum, toy museum
- Collection size: 20,000
- Founder: Norman Dean
- President: Doug Alexander
- Public transit access: Smith St at Cleveland Showground
- Website: redlandmuseum.org.au

The Redlands Coast Museum (formerly Redland Museum) is the local history museum of South East Queensland's Redlands region, situated in the suburb of Cleveland. It collects and preserves Redlands' social history to the present day.

The museum in Queensland has close to 20,000 items on display and in storage, along with a 2,700m^{2} building in Cleveland. The museum operates a historical reference library, the adjacent functional blacksmith's shop, and a small outpost on nearby Russell Island.

== History ==
Originating as a project of the Rotary Club of Cleveland in 1968, the first stage Museum building was constructed, opening to the public in 1970. It was soon dedicated to the people of the Redlands. As the Museum increased its collection size and popularity, largely due to the efforts of local volunteers, it outgrew the original building. This led to major expansions after 2009, allowing for more items to be displayed.

== Collection ==
Much of the museum's collection consists of donations from local residents, all of which are processed and catalogued by Museum volunteers. The items mostly reflect the Redlands' colonial and agricultural history, due to the region's historical value for farming and fishing, although several items originated from elsewhere in South East Queensland. Among the most popular objects in the Collection are:

- A restored Ford Model TT truck, originally purchased by a Mount Cotton farmer, with its wooden frame built by a local coachbuilder
- A functional player piano
- An original Halladay windpump used in a Cleveland farm
- An 1860s wedding gown, worn at a wedding in Toowoomba
- A manual pill-making machine used in a nearby pharmacy
- A Magneto telephone switchboard from Kingsthorpe
- A large patchwork quilt representing the Redlands' international diversity
- RM74 Gardner (formerly AEC) diesel railmotor, operated Normanton - Croydon Gulflander 1964–1982

== Displays and exhibitions ==
The Museum houses many permanent displays, featuring, respectively: farm equipment (Dan Holzapfel Farm Pavilion); post office materials; bedroom furnishings; dolls; textiles; and varying items and texts of particularly local historical importance (Stories of the Redlands).

A series of constantly-changing exhibitions are also run by the Museum. Exhibits of: writing (including a 1716 King James Bible); mannequins; bicycles; a Reedy River performance; wall-length murals; culture-fusing artistic displays; Queensland history; and Australian Aboriginal culture are among past highlights.

=== Australian Toy Hall of Fame ===
The Australian Toy Hall of Fame intends to commemorate the toys that have been iconic to Australia throughout its history. Nominations are accepted based on popularity, endurance, and remembrance; Lego, marbles, slingshots, toy cars, and teddy bears are current inclusions. The display also features an interactive play area for children.
