= Industrial Ruins, Macleay Island =

Industrial ruins
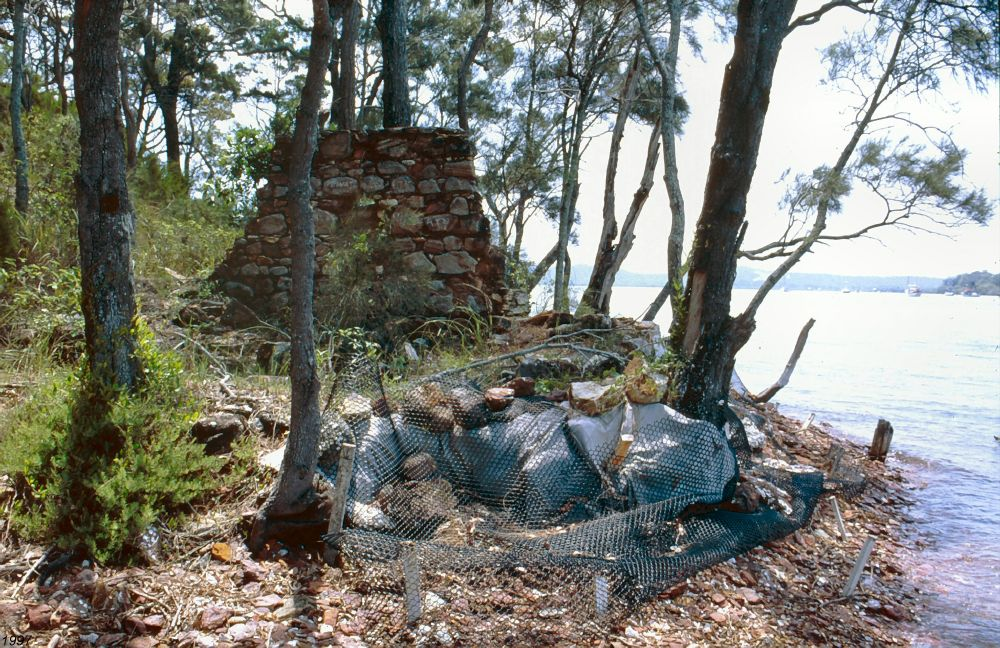
- Industrial Ruins, south end of Macleay Island, 1997

- Location within Queensland Location within Australia
- 27.6321°S 153.362°E
- Location: Cliff Terrace, Macleay Island, City of Redland, Queensland, Australia

History
- Design period: 1840s - 1860s (mid-19th century)
- Built: c. 1869 - c. 1871

Queensland Heritage Register
- Official name: Industrial Ruins, south end of Macleay Island
- Type: state heritage (archaeological)
- Designated: 6 April 1998
- Reference no.: 601062
- Significant period: 1869-1871 (fabric, historical)
- Significant components: flue - underground, wall/s - retaining, slipway, fire box, machinery/plant/equipment - manufacturing/processing, road/roadway

The Industrial ruins are a heritage-listed archaeological site at Cliff Terrace, Macleay Island, City of Redland, Queensland, Australia. It was built from c. 1869 to c. 1871. It was added to the Queensland Heritage Register on 6 April 1998.

== History ==
The Industrial Ruins appear to be associated with the 1869 establishment of a sugar mill, possibly in conjunction with a salt works, on the island. Although no early description of the mill and salt works has been found, documentary evidence reveals that a sugar mill was erected on the island in 1869, that both a sugar mill and a salt works were extant on the southern half of Macleay Island in 1871, but that possibly neither were operating by 1874. The surviving Cornish boiler in its stone fire-box is likely to date to the 1860s-1870s, Cornish boilers generally being superseded in Queensland by the 1880s. This re-inforces the hypothesis that the ruins are associated with sugar manufacture/salt production on the island in the late 1860s/early 1870s.

At this period, sugar cultivation and manufacture in Queensland was still experimental. In the late 1860s the principal sugar-growing area extended from Tingalpa and Cleveland south to the Redland Bay, Logan and Albert districts. The red clay soil on Macleay and Russell Islands in southern Moreton Bay was similar to that at Redland Bay, and the islands had the additional advantage of being free from frosts. On the mainland a number of small sugar crushing mills and distilleries were erected, employing an open pan system which produced a coarse, dark brown sugar. With the introduction in the mid-1870s of the more expensive vacuum pan system, which produced a finer white sugar, and increasing competition from the Mary and Burnett River districts, sugar cultivation and manufacture in the southern part of the colony declined. Some mills survived, but by the 1880s, farmers at Cleveland, Redland Bay and the Bay islands were growing mainly bananas, fruits and vegetables.

There is little recorded activity on Macleay Island until it was taken up in 1865 as leasehold under the Sugar & Coffee Regulations of 1864, by the Campbell family of Redbank.

John "Tinker" Campbell was one of the first squatters on the Darling Downs, taking up Westbrook run in 1841. In the 1840s he was associated with Evan Mackenzie of Kilcoy station in establishing a boiling down and tallow works at Kangaroo Point. Later he was associated with Joseph Fleming, and then with Robert Towns, in partnerships in Redbank interests. A bitter legal dispute between Towns and Campbell in the mid-1860s ruined Campbell financially, but with the help of his children, he turned his interest to sugar cultivation in southern Moreton Bay.

His son Frederick Foster Campbell had already taken up land at Redland Bay, on the shores of Moreton Bay directly opposite Macleay Island, under the Cotton Regulations of 1860. In March 1865, John Campbell's youngest son, Robert Perkins, applied for the southern half of Macleay Island (640 acres (260 ha)), and Rebecca Elizabeth Owen, Campbell's widowed daughter, applied for the northern quarter (320 acres (130 ha)) in September the same year. Macleay (or Tim Shea's) Island was officially surveyed into 3 portions in October 1865, following which Rebecca Owen successfully applied for the middle portion (350 acres (140 ha)), extending her leasehold to 670 acres (270 ha), or the northern half of the island. Early in 1866 John Campbell and Giles B Daubeney (or d'Aubigne) also took up the lease of 640 acres (260 ha) at the northwest end of Russell Island.

John Campbell and Rebecca Owen were still resident at Redbank at this period, and it is likely that Frederick and Robert Campbell established the sugar plantations on Macleay and Russell islands. Mrs da Costa, a visitor to the islands in late 1866/early 1867, later recalled that two of the Campbells of Redbank had taken up land on Russell Island, where they were engaged in sugar growing with a French naturalist by the name of d'Aubigne. On Macleay Island, she was the guest of Mrs Owen and her brothers Robert and Fred Campbell. The Queensland Post Office Directory for 1868 lists R Campbell as farming on Macleay Island, F Campbell and Giles B Daubeney as farming on Russell Island, and J de Poix Tyrel as a manager on Macleay. By December 1867, Campbell & Daubeney of Brisbane had transferred their lease on Russell Island to WK Alexander, and by early 1868 John Campbell had taken up residence on Macleay Island. In June 1868, Robert Campbell transferred his lease of the southern half of Macleay Island to his father and his other brother, John Edwin Campbell.

By late 1868, John Campbell had 40 acres (16 ha) under sugar on Macleay Island, and Rebecca Gosset (formerly Owen) 20 acres (8.1 ha). At this period the Macleay Island cane was likely crushed on a floating mill (the Walrus) which operated in the southern Bay down to the Logan and Albert rivers.

In 1869 the Campbells negotiated with the Brisbane mercantile firm of J & G Harris to take over the lease of southern Macleay Island, and transfer was effected in September 1869. John Campbell was still resident on Macleay Island and was supervising the sugar plantation there in early July 1869, when he gave evidence before the Select Committee on the Operation of "The Polynesian Laborers Act of 1868". The Campbells employed South Sea Islander labour, and Campbell had recently returned 44 Islanders from Macleay Island to their homes. His son Frederick had brought them in the Black Dog from Erromanga, Sandwich (now Efate) & Tanna Islands (all of which are now part of Vanuatu) about April 1866, and their 3-year contract was over.

By October 1869, John Campbell had nearly completed the erection of a sugar mill on Macleay Island, but whether construction of the mill was financed by J & G Harris or the Campbells is not clear. By the end of 1869 he had 65 acres (26 ha) under sugar and a mill. The same amount of land was under sugar in 1870.

In 1885, an unnamed author (possibly RS Hurd, Harris' manager on Macleay Island in the early 1870s) described the improvements on the southern half of the island during John Campbell's time there:

"Here was the residence of the late Mr John Campbell, and some thirty acres were under cultivation for sugar-cane, as well as peach trees, bananas, and other fruits. There was in those days a good cypress pine house erected there, a large and well-stocked fruit and flower garden, well laid out and a complete plant for sugar-boiling and salt- making. All this, however, is a thing of the past . . . this ridge where the house was built is admirably suited for well-sinking, as the ground retains the water as well as if it were puddled. Mr Campbell had a well sunk there some 8ft deep, and it lasted out the driest season with no perceptible leakage . . . this is where the view is par excellence of the whole place to be obtained. Standing on the top of the hill, the ground slopes away in front to Pininpinin Point . . . In front are Karragarra and Russell Islands . . . this deep channel separating Macleay and Karragarra is one of the deepest parts of the bay, and well stocked with fish, Mr Campbell constructed a fish trap at the end of the jetty, and told the writer that he had caught large rock cod in it and abundance of mullet. There is a very pretty walk through the old plantation towards Perrebinpa Point, which is a narrow gravelly neck of land, reaching a long way out. There are a great number of pine seedlings growing along this track and one of the best residences at Breakfast creek is beautified with pine trees taken from this very locality."

About 1870, after the transfer of the southern half of the island to J & G Harris, John Campbell moved to the northern end of Macleay Island, where he supervised his daughter's lease, establishing a castor oil plantation there by September 1871. Following the death of Rebecca Gosset in Rockhampton in 1872, her husband transferred her Macleay Island lease to John Harris in June 1872, and the Campbell family may have left the island about this time.

In August 1870, J & G Harris had converted their leasehold of the southern half of Macleay Island into freehold, and the plantation was advertised for sale in April 1871. At this time it comprised 640 acres (260 ha) of freehold land, with 40 acres (16 ha) under sugar; a furnished residence with fine views, out-buildings, and a large tank with a permanent supply of water for household purposes; men's huts, stock-yard, blacksmith's; a sugar mill driven by a 4 horsepower (3.0 kW) engine; and a salt works. South Sea Islanders were working on the plantation. In October 1871, the plantation was sold to Arthur Cumming Biddle of London for £500.

The plantation again was put up for sale in February 1874, at which time 50–60 acres (20–24 ha) were under sugarcane. Improvements comprised: a furnished 10-roomed house (the front section of which was of cypress pine); 3 men's cottages; stables, cart sheds, stockyards, etc.; a wharf; stone store; and a large underground tank furnishing a permanent supply of water. There was no mention of a sugar mill or salt works, and agricultural reports in The Queenslander of 1876 suggest that Macleay Island cane was crushed on the mainland at this period. The plantation did not sell in 1874, and appears to have been let run down subsequently.

In October 1878, absentee landlord AC Biddle of London purchased from John Harris the northern half of Macleay Island, along with neighbouring Perulpa and Ngudooroo (Lamb) islands, for £925. In October 1884, title to the whole of Macleay, Perulpa and Ngudooroo (Lamb) islands was transferred from Biddle to Joseph Darragh of Brisbane, and then in June 1885 from Darragh to Gustavus Caesar Horstmann and William Alexander Wilson, also of Brisbane. Around this time Macleay Island was subdivided into a large number of residential and farm allotments, many of which were taken up by speculators in the 1880s and 1890s. The block on which the industrial ruins are located (subdivision 279 of portion 1 - a residential subdivision of 1 rood 10.6 perches (1,280 m^{2})), was purchased in June 1886 by Brisbane businessmen Edward Taylor, Edward Kelk and Frank Lescombe John Crosby, for £18. To date, no record has been found of any subsequent industrial, commercial or residential use of this site, suggesting that the industrial ruins are associated with the establishment of the sugar plantation in the late 1860s, early 1870s.

== Description ==
The industrial ruins are located at the south end of Macleay Island in southern Moreton Bay, on the foreshore east of Pininpinin Point and directly opposite Karragarra Island (27°38′5″S 153°21′37″E). Remnants of several stone structures on this site, nestled near the foreshore, just above high- water mark at the bottom of a steep, wooded slope, are visible from Moreton Bay. The setting is highly picturesque.

The site comprises:

- the remnants of a stone structure (possibly the stone store mentioned in the 1874 advertisement) located on the foreshore at the bottom of a steep slope, about a metre above high-water mark - the foundations of the walls and the remains of a rubble floor, built up several feet above the level of the foreshore, survive, as does part of the east wall, which is of irregular coursing of roughly cut stone, held together with a coarse mortar - of the south and west walls only the foundations survive, and these have suffered erosion from wave action at high tide - recent attempts at stabilising these foundations with plastic netting and sheeting have been made
- remnants of a possible stone retaining wall along the foreshore at high-water mark, in front of the "store" and further along to the west of the "store" - recent wave action has deposit gravel on the foreshore, mostly the remnant retaining wall in front of the "store"
- remnants of the foundation of a secondary stone structure to the west of the larger "store"
- a stone fire-box located less than a metre to the north (further up the slope) of the stone "store" - the fire-box is cut lengthwise in an east-west direction into the side of the slope, and measures approximately 8 metres (26 ft) long by 3 metres (9.8 ft) wide - like the "store", the fire-box is constructed of irregular coursing of mainly roughly cut stone, held together by a coarse mortar - however, some of the larger stones are more precisely cut and appear to have simple, decorative chiselled patterns on the face, possibly indicating that they have been recycled from some other structure - the fire-box is open-ended on the east side to allow the fire to be lit beneath the boiler, a stone-pitched flue at the western end of the fire-box drawing the flames and heat underneath the boiler
- the shell of a hemispherically-ended, iron-plated Cornish boiler [c. 1860s/1870s], in situ in the firebox - the boiler has a diameter of 160 centimetres (63 in) and a length of 680 centimetres (270 in)
- a stone-pitched underground flue leading from the western end of the fire-box directly north up the slope approximately 14 metres (46 ft) to an open depression in the ground - possibly the base of a brick chimney
- an early road, in some places shored-up by stonework, wending diagonally down the steep slope from the top of the adjacent western allotment, to the boiler site
- a timber slipway, visible at low-tide only, on the shore near the southeast corner of the stone "store"
- possible winch tracks on the road reserve adjacent to the eastern boundary of the allotment on which the stone ruins are located - the road reserve (surveyed c. 1885) runs north-south down the steep slope directly to the timber slipway at the water's edge, following two deep parallel depressions, approximately 1.5 metres (4 ft 11 in) apart, which are possibly the remains of some form of winching operation - these disappear into the bush above the industrial ruins site, continuing approximately 150 metres (490 ft) to the level land of the ridge above

Whether the stone used for the boiler site structures was quarried on Macleay Island has not been established, no obvious quarry site being identified in the immediate vicinity. Geologically, the eastern side of the island belongs to the Kurwongbah Beds - a mix of phyllite, greenstone, minor quartz and argillite (sedimentary rocks subjected to consolidation and intense compression); the western side of the island belongs to the Woogaroo Subgroup of later sedimentary rocks - mainly sandstone and conglomerate.

Historical evidence suggests that a jetty and/or wharf, at the end of which was a fish-trap, was constructed by John Campbell in the late 1860s. The jetty/wharf is likely to have been positioned near the boiler site. Beside the slipway are the remnants of two posts which may have been associated with this jetty.

== Heritage listing ==
Industrial Ruins, south end of Macleay Island was listed on the Queensland Heritage Register on 6 April 1998 having satisfied the following criteria.

The place is important in demonstrating the evolution or pattern of Queensland's history.

The Industrial Ruins, south end of Macleay Island [including the ruins of what appear to be a stone store, stone retaining wall/s, stone fire-box and Cornish boiler, stone-pitched underground flue and probable chimney base, early road, foreshore slipway and possible winching channels], are believed to be associated with the sugar plantation established on Macleay Island in the late 1860s/early 1870s, when sugar cultivation in Queensland was still largely experimental. They survive as important illustration of the early agricultural and industrial development of Queensland, and of the settlement of southern Moreton Bay in particular.

The place demonstrates rare, uncommon or endangered aspects of Queensland's cultural heritage.

The surviving Cornish boiler, common in Queensland sawmills and sugar mills of the 1860s and 1870s, is one of few of this type known to survive in Queensland.

The place has potential to yield information that will contribute to an understanding of Queensland's history.

With further archaeological and historical research and analysis, the place has the potential to reveal important information about Queensland's history and early industrial technology.

The place is important because of its aesthetic significance.

The ambience of the stone ruins, the bay, and the overgrown vegetation, combined with a distinctive position on the foreshore overlooking southern Moreton Bay and neighbouring islands, creates a strong aesthetic appeal which has attracted public interest and has invited "exploration", for well over a century.

The place has a strong or special association with a particular community or cultural group for social, cultural or spiritual reasons.

For the southern Moreton Bay islands community, the place has a strong association with their heritage, and the place has had a landmark value for Moreton Bay boaters since the late 19th century.
