= Redland City Council v Kozik =

Redland City Council v Kozik is a decision of the High Court of Australia. The case concerned the law of restitution in Australia.

== Facts ==
Redland City Council had collected around $10m through special rates from landholders on a waterfront, for the purpose of nearby construction works. It was later found that the special rates were unlawful and invalid.

After the landholders sued to obtain their money back, the council attempted to argue that it should be allowed to keep part of the money collected which it had already spent on some of the construction works.

== Judgement ==
The High Court in 3–2 majority held that the council was required to pay the full amount back. The court gave three reasons why this was required. Firstly, the council's obligation to carry out the works was independent of the legal regime for collecting the rates; secondly, the construction works didn't provide a benefit to the people the rates were collected from; and thirdly, allowing the council to keep the money would undermine the regulatory regime the council should have been following when it improperly imposed the special rates.
