= Coochiemudlo Island =

- Suburb
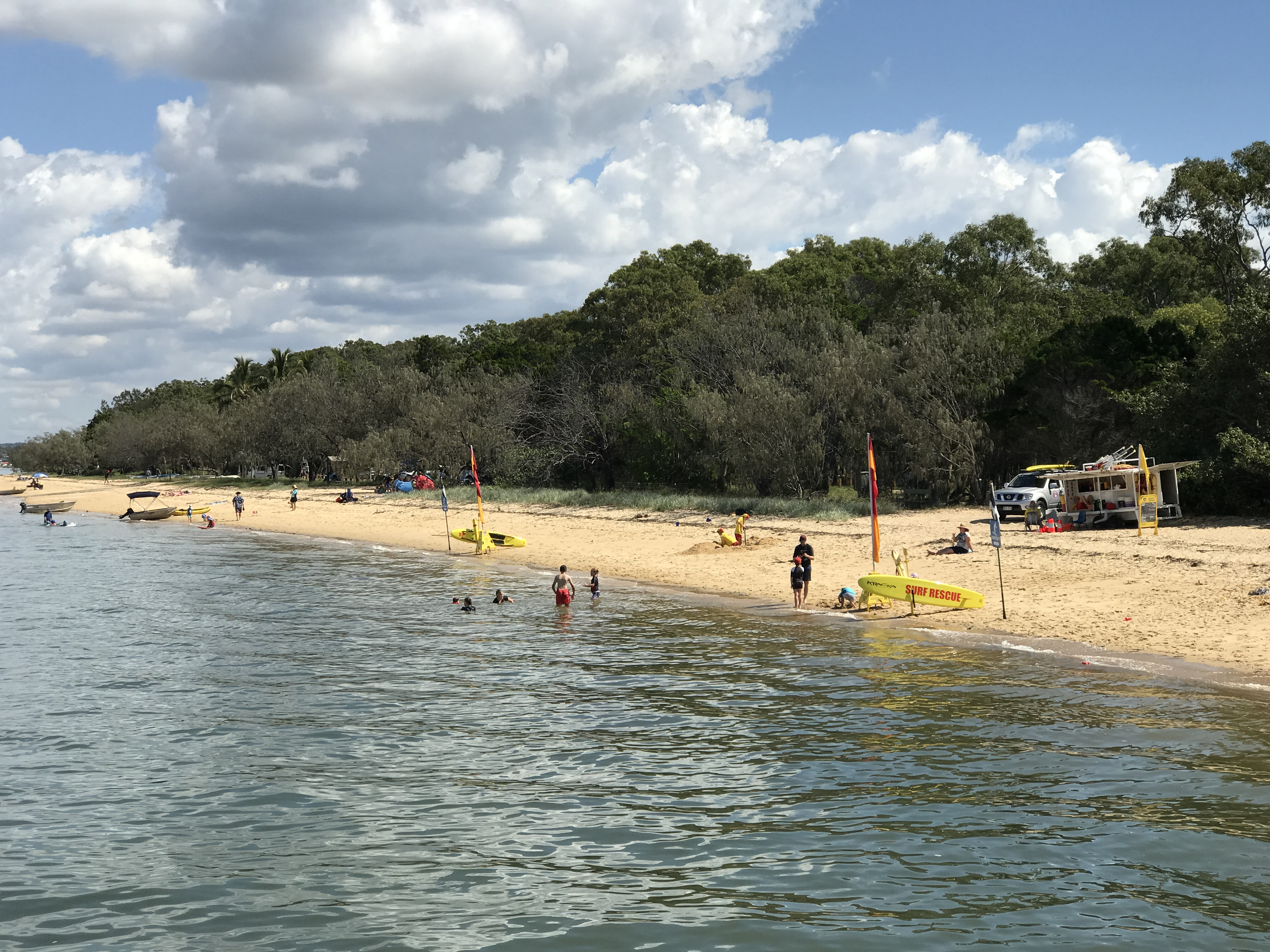
- Main Beach at Coochiemudlo Island, 2017

- Interactive map of Coochiemudlo Island
- Coordinates: 27.5725°S 153.3302°E
- Country: Australia
- State: Queensland
- City: Moreton Bay
- LGA: Redland City

Government
  - State electorate: Redlands
  - Federal division: Bowman

Area
  - Total: 4.1 km^{2} (1.6 sq mi)

Population
  - Total: 850 (2021 census)
  - Density: 207/km^{2} (537/sq mi)
- Time zone: UTC+10:00 (AEST)
- Postcode: 4184
Suburbs around Coochiemudlo Island
Cleveland	Moreton Bay	Peel Island
Victoria Point; Thornlands	Coochiemudlo Island	North Stradbroke Island
Redland Bay	Moreton Bay	Macleay Island

Coochiemudlo Island is a small island in the southern part of Moreton Bay, near Brisbane, in South East Queensland, Australia. It is also the name of the locality upon the island, which is within the local government area of Redland City, but the town is called Coochie.

There is no road access to the island, which is a 2.0-kilometre (1.2 mi) ferry ride from the jetty at Victoria Point, which is in turn 12.4 kilometres (7.7 mi) south-east of Cleveland and 36.3 kilometres (22.6 mi) east-south-east of the Brisbane CBD.

In the 2021 census, Coochiemudlo Island had a population of 850.

== Geography ==
The island covers a total area of 4.1 km^{2} (1.6 square miles) and is approximately 1 kilometre (0.62 mi) from Victoria Point, Coochiemudlo Island is also in Redland City. A natural cliff composed of iron-rich rock is exposed on the south western side of the island. Sandy beaches wrap around the island's southern, eastern and northern sides. Mangroves cover the western foreshore of the island.

== History ==
The name Coochiemudlo is the English language version of the Yuggera words kutchi (meaning red) and mudlo (meaning stone).

The British explorer Matthew Flinders landed on Coochiemudlo Island on 19 July 1799, while he was mapping the southern part of Moreton Bay. The original European name was Innis Island from 1825 to 1850. The island celebrates Flinders Day annually, commemorating the landing of Flinders. The celebrations are usually held on a weekend near 19 July, the actual date of the landing.

== Demographics ==
In the 2021 census, Coochiemudlo Island had a population of 850.

In the 2016 census, Coochiemudlo Island had a population of 753.

In the 2011 census, Coochiemudlo Island had a population of 708, 52.7% female and 47.3% male. The median age of the Coochiemudlo Island population was 52, 15 years above the national median of 37. 67.8% of people living in Coochiemudlo Island were born in Australia. The other top responses for country of birth were England 7.8%, New Zealand 6.1%, Germany 1%, Croatia 1%, and Philippines 0.7%. 88% of people spoke only English at home; the next most common languages were 0.6% German, 0.6% Indonesian, 0.6% Serbian, 0.4% Dutch, 0.4% Swedish.

In the 2006 census, Coochiemudlo Island had a population of 658. Over 43% were more than 54 years old. Of families 58.2% were couples without children. The most common response for religious affiliation was "No Religion" at 24.2%, well above the Australian average of 18.7%. 269 said that they were in the workforce with 60% in full-time occupations and 28% working part-time. Only 5% of the island's workforce said they were unemployed. The major areas of employment were Hospitals, Local Government Administration, Other Social Assistance Services, Residential Care Services and Building Completion Services. The median weekly household income was $616, compared to $1,027 for Australia overall.

== Education ==
There are no schools on Coochiemudlo Island. The nearest government primary and secondary schools are Victoria Point State School and Victoria Point State High School, both in Victoria Point. There are also other non-government schools in Victoria Point.

== Transport and services ==
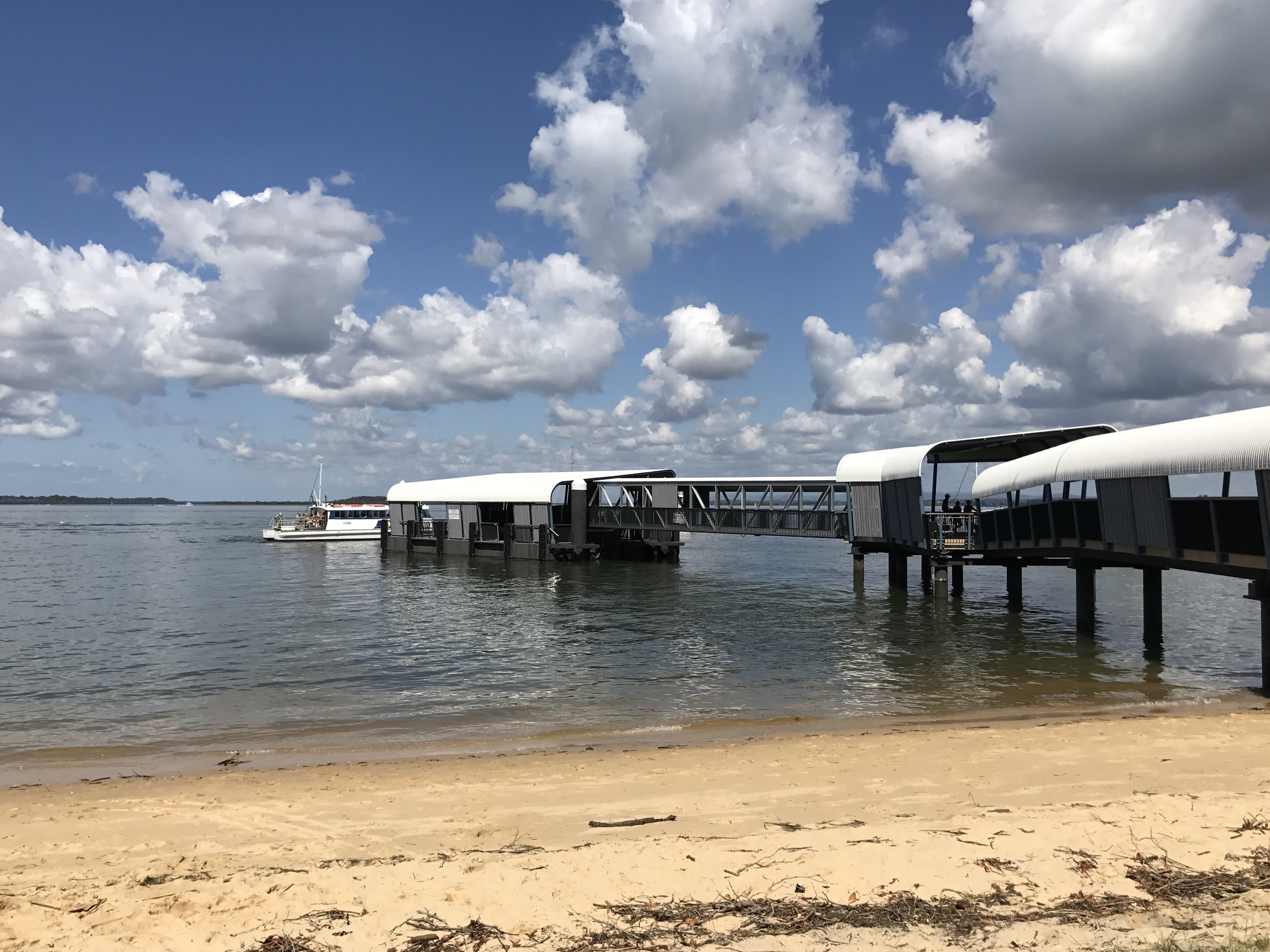
Ferry Terminal, 2017

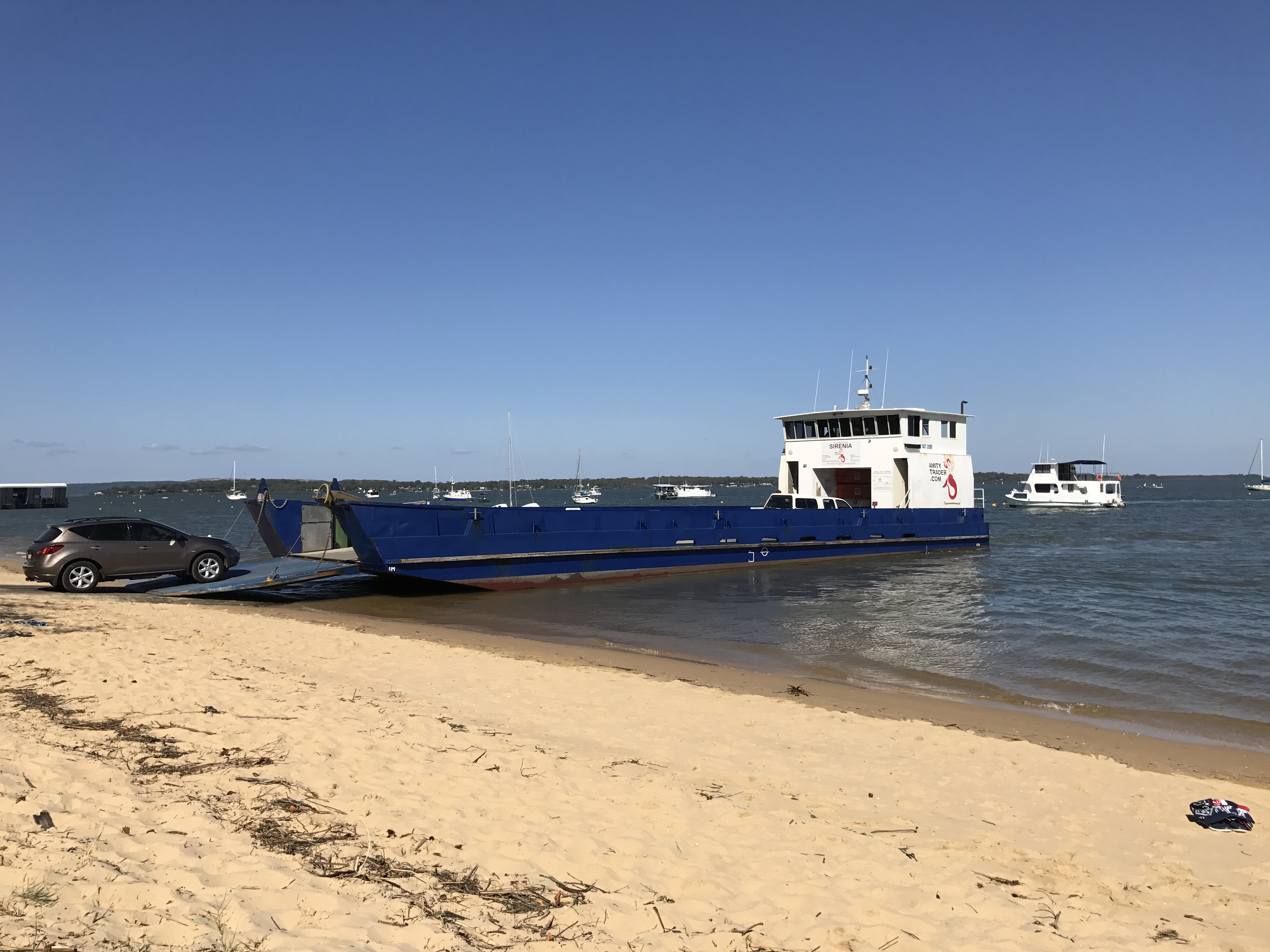
Barge at Coochemudlo Island, 2017

The island is serviced by a passenger ferry, operating approximately every half-hour between about 5:00am and 11:00pm. A vehicular barge also operates regular services to and from the island. Due to the relatively small area, a car is not essential for getting around.

The island's newspaper, the Coochie Island News, was established in February 2019 and has a readership of approximately 3,000 in print and online. Its mission is to publish inspiring and positive content that showcases the island's strengths and its pages feature news, articles, fishing and boating reports and stories, health/wellbeing articles, poetry and book reviews written by island contributors, as well as interviews with creatives and island residents. It includes a business directory and directory of community activities, groups and their contacts. Its last edition was January 2023.

A podcast featuring interviews with island residents, experts on island life and Australia's demographer Bernard Salt was launched in 2020.

== Wildlife ==
There are many types of wildlife on the island, with its birdlife including sea eagles, brahminy kites, magpies, rosellas, butcher birds, pheasant coucals and a colony of stone curlews which are counted each year.

The waters around Coochiemudlo contain dugongs, turtles and dolphins.

There is a walk through the Melalueca Wetland Reserve with its variety of native plants and trees.

A fauna survey was conducted there in 2016.

== Amenities ==
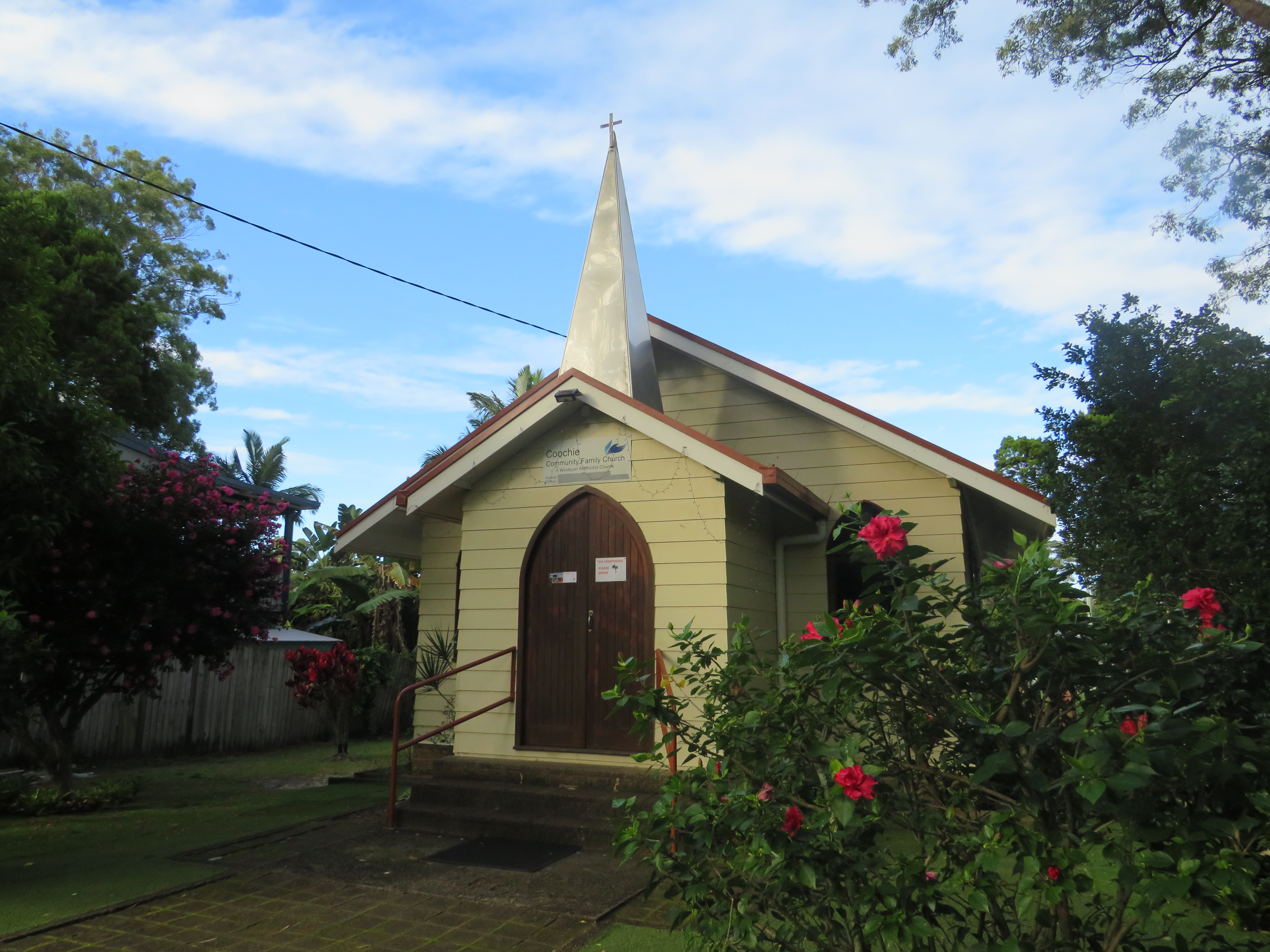
Pineridge Chapel frontage, May 2024.

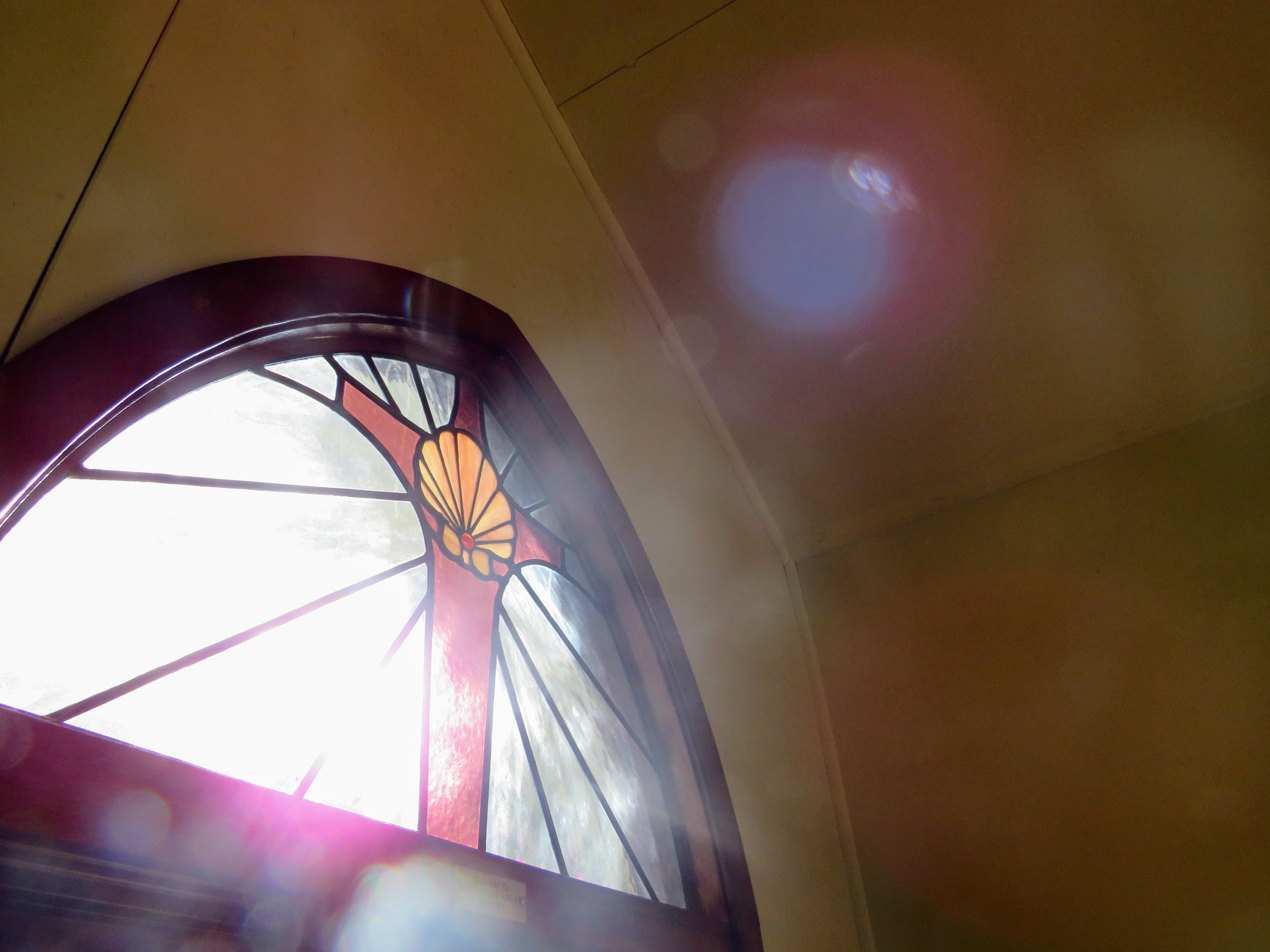
One of the two stained glass windows in Pineridge Chapel, May 2024.

Coochiemudlo community hall is a public hall is at 346 Victoria Parade (27.5742°S 153.3233°E).

Pineridge Chapel is a church located at 11 Shirley Street (27.5713°S 153.3338°E). It was formerly the Coochie Community Family Church. It is part of the Wesleyan Methodist Church.

There is a boat ramp at Tageruba Street on the south side of the island (27.5745°S 153.3297°E). It is managed by the Redland City Council. Vehicular ferries use the boat ramp.

There is a jetty and pontoon in Elizabeth Street on the south side of island (27.5746°S 153.3322°E). It is managed by the Redland City Council. Passenger ferries use the jetty.

== Facilities ==
Coochiemudlo has some emergency services:

- Coochiemudlo Island Fire Station (27.5692°S 153.3335°E)
- Coochiemudlo Ambulance Station (27.5733°S 153.3258°E)

== Attractions ==
East Coochie Reef is a 15.2-hectare (38-acre) artificial reef in the Moreton Bay Marine Park (27.5693°S 153.3515°E).

== See also ==
- List of islands of Queensland
