= Victoria Point bus station =

Bus station in Queensland, Australia

Victoria Point

General information
- Location: Bunker Road, Victoria Point
- Coordinates: 27.586616°S 153.279646°E
- Platforms: 1 side platform, 4 stops

Construction
- Accessible: Yes
Location

Victoria Point is a bus station operated by Translink. It is part of the Victoria Point Shopping Centre and is a major interchange for Translink's Eastern Region.
