= Macleay Island =

- Town
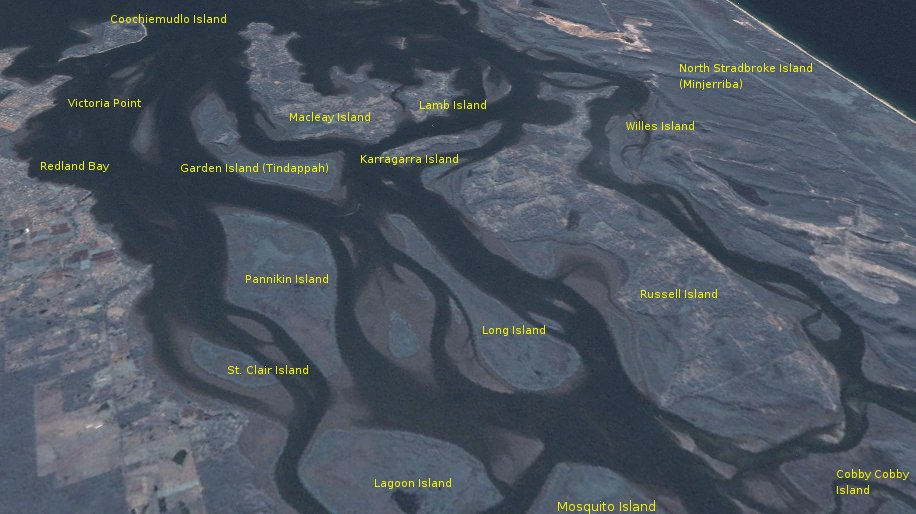
- Macleay Island is one of several inhabited islands in Moreton Bay

- Interactive map of Macleay Island
- Coordinates: 27.6105°S 153.3552°E
- Country: Australia
- State: Queensland
- Region: South East Queensland
- City: Moreton Bay
- LGA: Redland City

Government
  - State electorate: Redlands
  - Federal division: Bowman

Area
  - Total: 15.4 km^{2} (5.9 sq mi)

Population
  - Total: 3,193 (2021 census)
  - Density: 207.3/km^{2} (537.0/sq mi)
- Time zone: UTC+10:00 (AEST)
- Postcode: 4184
Localities around Macleay Island
Moreton Bay	Moreton Bay	Moreton Bay
Moreton Bay	Macleay Island	Moreton Bay
Moreton Bay	Karragarra Island	Lamb Island

Macleay Island is an island in Moreton Bay, South East Queensland, Australia. The island constitutes a town and locality within the City of Redland. In the 2021 census, Macleay Island had a population of 3,193 people.

== Geography ==
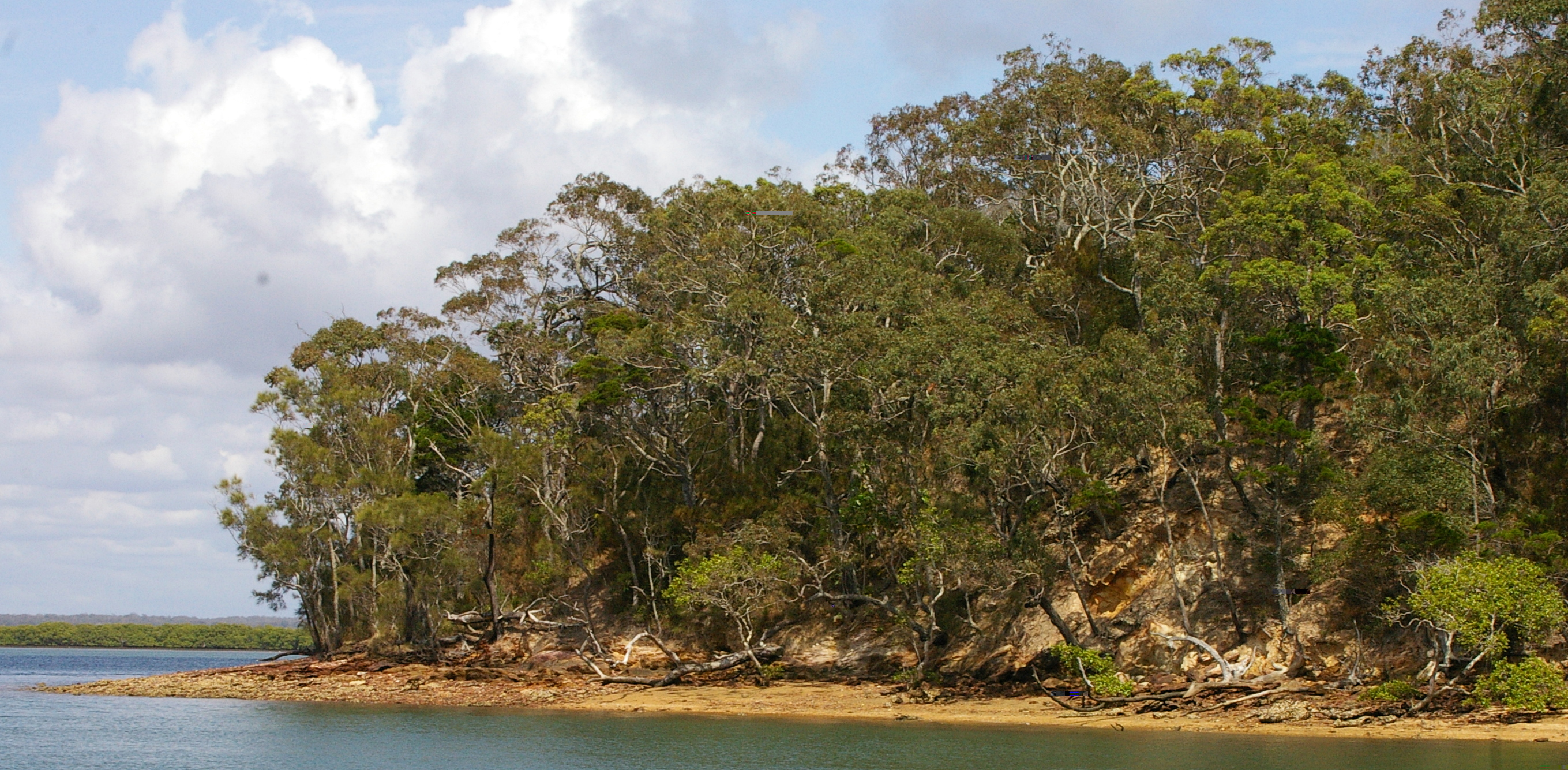
Macleay Island foreshore, 2012

Macleay Island is the fourth largest island in Moreton Bay after North Stradbroke Island, Moreton Island and Russell Island; it is 6.5 kilometres (4.0 mi) long and 4 kilometres (2.5 mi) wide at its widest point. Perulpa Island is a small island attached to Macleay Island by a causeway.

Macleay Island has the following capes and beaches (from north to south):

- Potts Point (Coondooroopa) (27.5805°S 153.3612°E)
- Sandpiper Beach (27.5936°S 153.3546°E)
- Thompson Point (27.6021°S 153.3494°E)
- Perrebinpa Point (27.6226°S 153.3490°E)
- Point Pininpinin (27.6319°S 153.3620°E)

== History ==
For some time in the 1800s the island was called Tim Shea's Island after a convict who lived on the island for more than a decade. The current name was given by surveyor James Warner who named the island after Alexander Macleay who was the Colonial Secretary of New South Wales from 1825 to 1837.

A map advertising land for sale by John Cameron auctioneer, in central Macleay, Macleay Island consisted of 308 marine villa sites each of 1/4 acre and upwards to be held on the ground on Friday 10 December 1886. The land on offer bordered Kalara Street to the north, Kate Street to the east and Karrawarra Street to the south. The advertisement offered a free trip by steamer and free luncheon to attendees with terms 1/4 cash balance by promissory note at 3,6,9,12 and 15 months with 8% added.

Macleay Island State School opened on 28 January 1986 and still operates today.

During the 2006 state election, the Queensland Government prioritised construction of a single-officer police station on the island as it was needed with the increasing population.

In 2007, after a short segment on the Nine television network's nationally broadcast A Current Affair based on the comments made by real estate watcher John Edwards of Residex said that Macleay Island was a "boom suburb" and worth watching by first home buyers. All the South Moreton Bay Islands received a considerable amount of interest from buyers. A surge in building followed which forced the Redland City Council revise its population estimates. It estimated 2,319 permanent residents on Macleay in 2008. However, with a count of 1,479 dwellings, the peak number of people on the islands during holidays and weekends the total population is thought to have been 3,254.

== Demographics ==
In the 2006 census, Macleay Island had a population of 1,958. However, owners who visit the island at weekends. Nearly a third of the 1,259 dwellings were listed as unoccupied at the time of the Tuesday night census.

In the 2011 census, Macleay Island had a population of 2,572 people, 49.9% female and 50.1% male. The median age of the Macleay Island population was 52 years, 15 years above the national median of 37. 68.3% of people living in Macleay Island were born in Australia. The other top responses for country of birth were England 7.1%, New Zealand 6.7%, Germany 1.4%, Scotland 1.2%, Netherlands 0.6%. 87.9% of people spoke only English at home; the next most common languages were 1.2% German, 0.3% Italian, 0.2% French, 0.2% Auslan, 0.2% Greek.

In the 2016 census, Macleay Island had a population of 2,681 people.

In the 2021 census, Macleay Island had a population of 3,193 people.

== Heritage listings ==
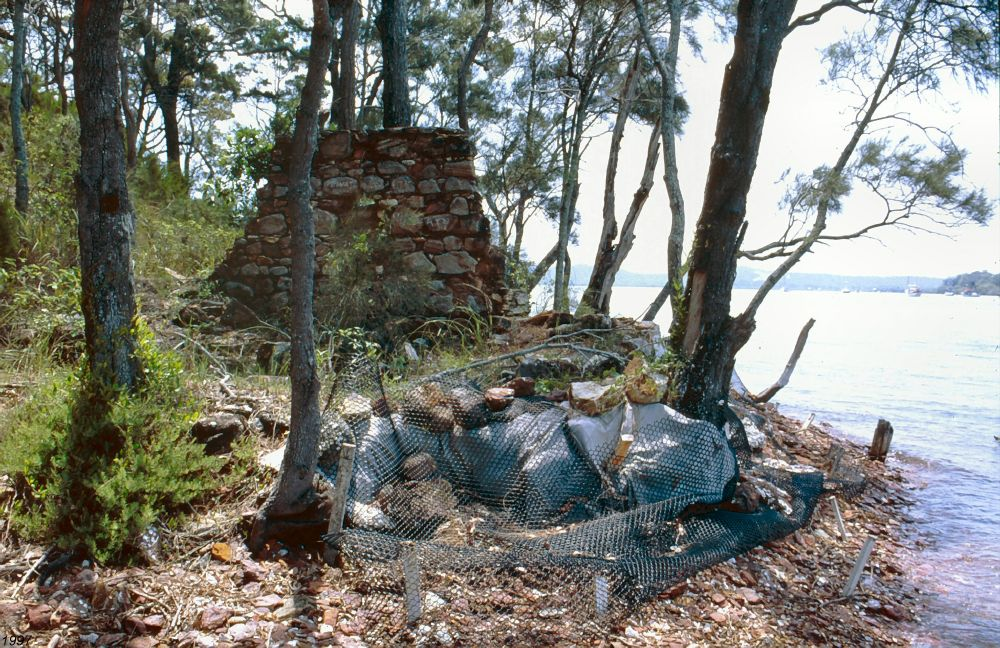
Industrial Ruins, south end of Macleay Island, 1997

Macleay Island has a number of heritage-listed sites, including:

- Tim Shea’s wetland and waterhole, 57-59 Charles Terrace
- Industrial Ruins of Campbell's Saltworks, 3-5 Cliff Terrace
- Corroboree Point (Lions Park), 7-9 Corroboree Place
- Thompson’s Point: Campbell's Wharf, end of Wharf Street

== Environment ==
The island's natural environment includes littoral rainforest, rocky shores, sandy beaches, mangrove areas and vistas to the mainland, to the north west across Coochiemudlo Island, over to North Stradbroke Island and up to Moreton Island. There's a large variety of birds inhabiting the island including native parrots and smaller birds, and migratory birds which visit annually. There is a large bush stone curlew population on the island.

== Education ==
MacLeay Island State School is a government primary (Prep-6) school for boys and girls at 145-155 High Central Road (27.6185°S 153.3595°E). In 2018, the school had an enrolment of 143 students with 17 teachers (14 full-time equivalent) and 13 non-teaching staff (8 full-time equivalent). In 2023, it had an enrolment of 141 students with 15 teachers (11 full-time equivalent) and 13 non-teaching staff (7 full-time equivalent). It includes a special education program.

There are no secondary schools on Macleay Island. The nearest government secondary school is Victoria Point State High School in Victoria Point to the west on the mainland.

== Transport ==
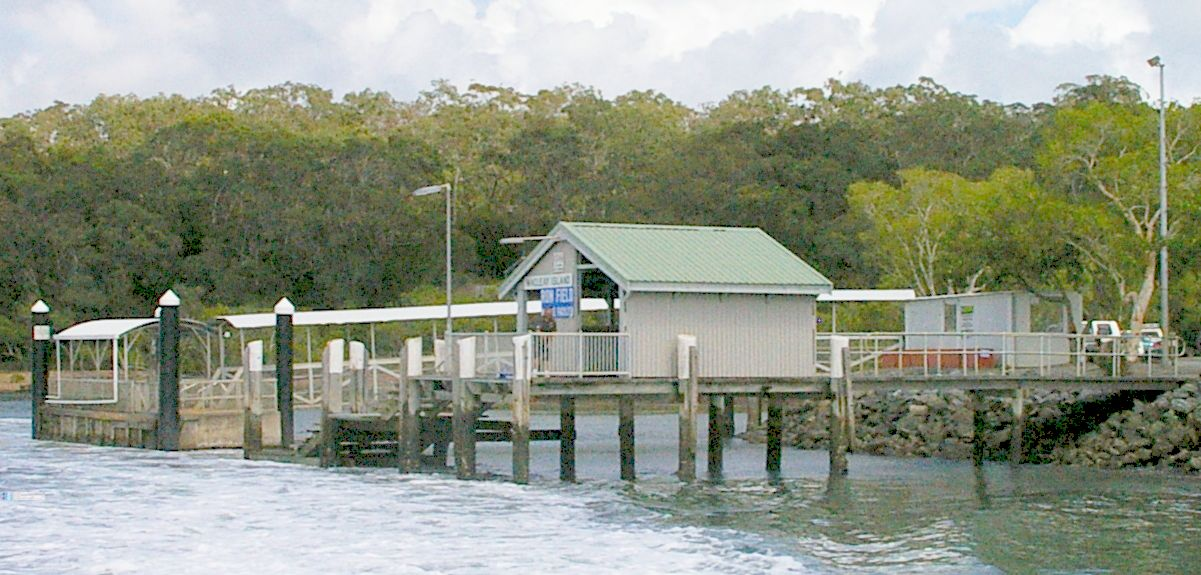
Macleay Island ferry terminal, 2012

The island is part of the Southern Bay Islands and can be accessed by passenger ferry from Redland Bay or vehicle barge from Cleveland or Redland Bay.

== See also ==
- List of islands of Australia
