= Redland City =

Coordinates: 27°35′35.86″S 153°15′59.11″E

- Local government area
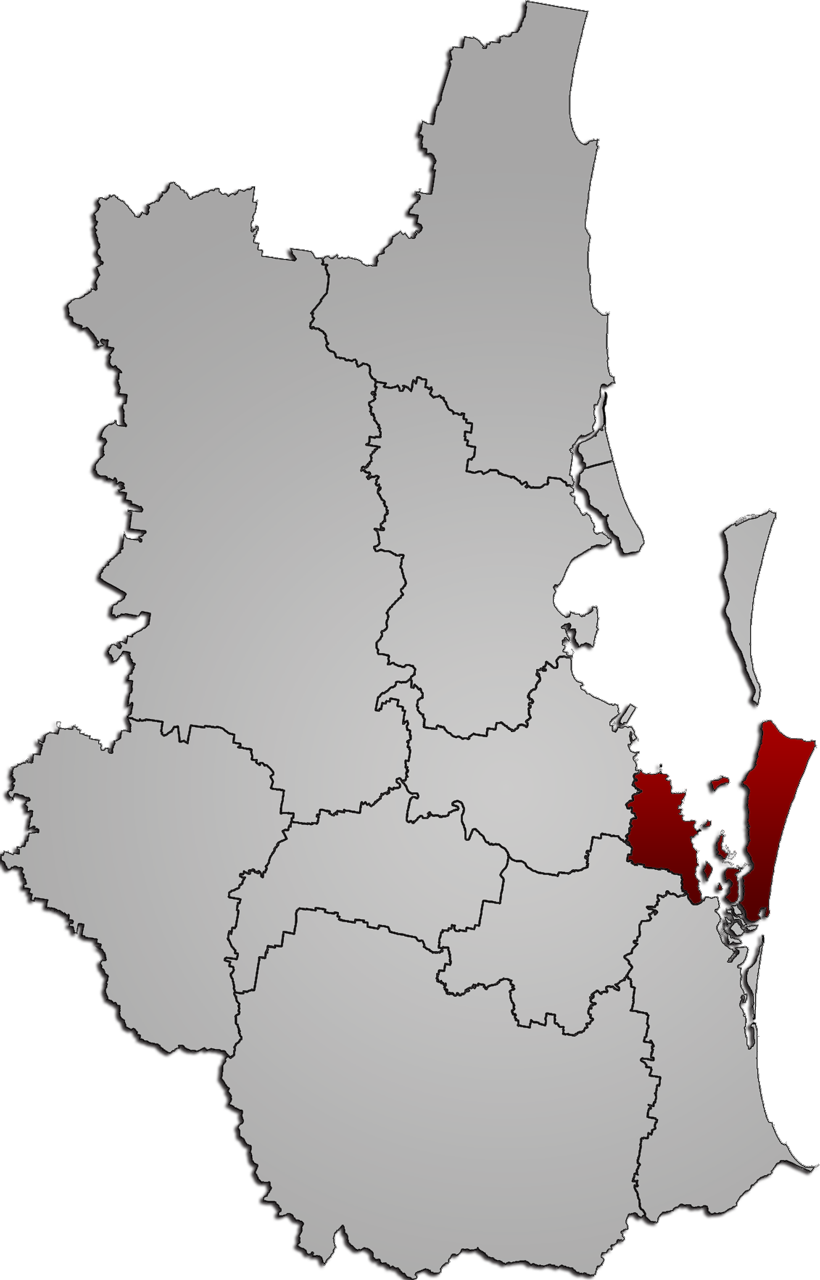
- Location within South East Queensland

- Interactive map of Redland City
- Country: Australia
- State: Queensland
- Region: South East Queensland
- Established: 1948
- Council seat: Cleveland

Government
  - Mayor: Jos Mitchell
  - State electorates: Capalaba; Oodgeroo; Redlands; Springwood (part)
  - Federal division: Bowman

Area
  - Total: 537.2 km^{2} (207.4 sq mi)

Population
  - Total: 159,222 (2021 census) (46th)
  - Density: 296.392/km^{2} (767.65/sq mi)
- Website: Redland City
LGAs around Redland City
Brisbane	Moreton Bay	Brisbane (Moreton Island)
Brisbane	Redland City	Coral Sea
Logan	Gold Coast	Coral Sea

Redland City, also known as the Redlands and formerly known as Redland Shire, is a local government area (LGA) and a part of Greater Brisbane in South East Queensland, Australia. With a population of 159,222 as of June 2021, Redland City is spread along the southern coast of Moreton Bay, covering 537.2 square kilometres (207.4 sq mi). The city borders the City of Brisbane to the west and north-west and Logan City to the south-west and south, while its islands are situated north of the City of Gold Coast.

The Redlands first attained city status on 15 March 2008, having been a shire since 1949, when it was created by a merger of the Tingalpa and Cleveland Shires. Despite this status, Redland City consists largely of suburban and coastal communities, featuring a somewhat disjointed urbanisation around major suburbs interspersed with bushland. Unlike many neighbouring LGAs, there is no clear city centre.

Major suburbs include Capalaba, Cleveland, Victoria Point, Thornlands, and Redland Bay. The latter is the city's namesake, due to the colour of its fertile soil. North Stradbroke Island and smaller nearby islands, most notably those of Southern Moreton Bay, comprise the eastern portion of the Redlands. The city's boundaries correspond to those of the federal division of Bowman.

In the 2021 census, the Redland City had a population of 159,222 people.

== History ==
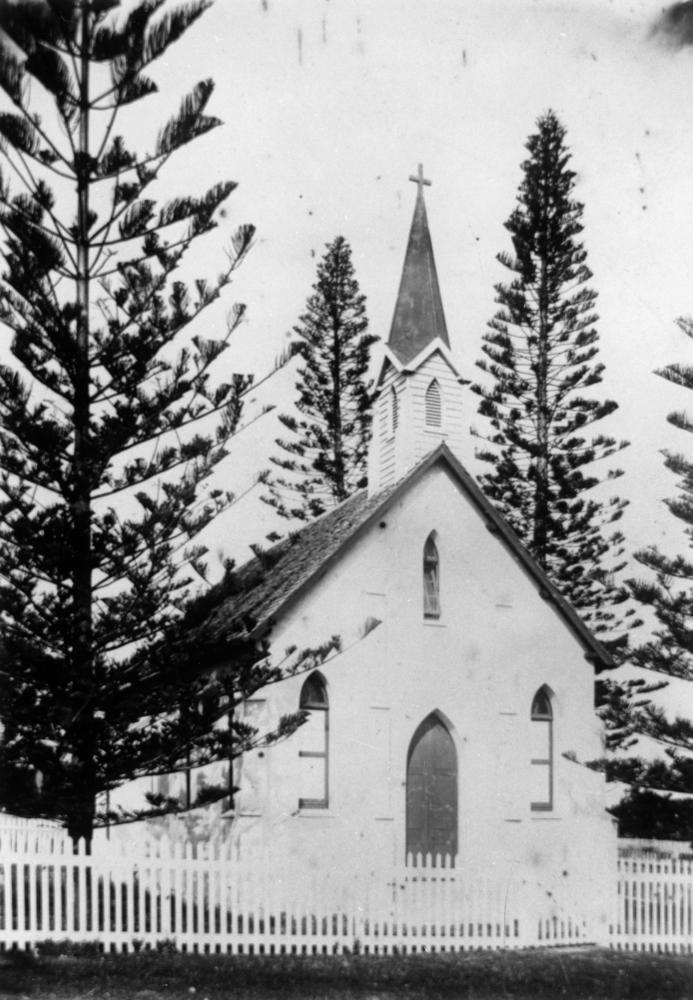
St Pauls Anglican Church in Cleveland, ca. 1905

The area now known as the Redlands was initially inhabited by the Jagera, Turrbal, and Quandamooka people. Some locations derive their names from Aboriginal languages, and known historic sites within the area include a bora ring at Mount Cotton. The Quandamooka are recognised as the traditional custodians of North Stradbroke Island, and more recently applied for native title over much of the Redlands' surrounding islands and mainland.

Jandai (also known as Janday, Jandewal, Djendewal, Jundai, Goenpul and Jandawal), is one of the Aboriginal languages used on Stradbroke Island.

Europeans first entered the Redlands in the late 18th century while mapping Moreton Bay: James Cook made observations of the then-undivided Stradbroke Island; Matthew Flinders landed on Coochiemudlo Island in 1799; and Robert Dixon later surveyed and named much of the area.

By the 1840s, the coastal township of Cleveland was in contention to become a major port replacing Brisbane, but was ultimately not chosen due to the region's existing sandbars and shipwrecks, and an unfavourable review from Governor George Gipps during his 1842 visit. Louis Hope and other land purchasers began to develop significant infrastructure at this time. On 11 November 1879, under the Divisional Boards Act 1879, the Tingalpa Division was created to govern the area to the east of metropolitan Brisbane. The area around Cleveland split away to form the Cleveland Division on 30 May 1885. Under the Local Authorities Act 1902, both became Shires on 31 March 1903. The Tingalpa council met at Mount Cotton.

On 1 October 1925, a sizeable portion of the Shire of Tingalpa (suburbs west of Tingalpa Creek, including Upper Mount Gravatt and Rochedale) became part of the new City of Brisbane along with 20 other local governments. On 9 December 1948, as part of a major reorganisation of local government in South East Queensland, an Order in Council renamed the Shire of Cleveland to be Shire of Redland and amalgamated part of Shire of Tingalpa into it (the other part of Tingalpa amalgamated to form the Shire of Albert).

The twentieth century saw significant population growth in the Redlands, preceded by the construction of the Cleveland railway line. Peel Island became a leper colony, while North Stradbroke Island became a hub for sand mining, and is also associated with the Indigenous rights movement as the home of poet Oodgeroo Noonuccal and academic Aileen Moreton-Robinson. On 15 March 2008, Redlands was granted city status.

In June 2018, the Redland City Council approved a marketing campaign to brand the city as "Redlands Coast" with the tagline "naturally wonderful". The campaign seeks to attract tourists to the city's 335 kilometres (208 mi) of coastline (due to a number of islands which form part of the city).

In late 2019, trials of Australia's first driverless bus were conducted on Karragarra Island with a view to introducing the service to the islands' communities. The trial was conducted by the Redland City Council and the RACQ.

== Geography ==
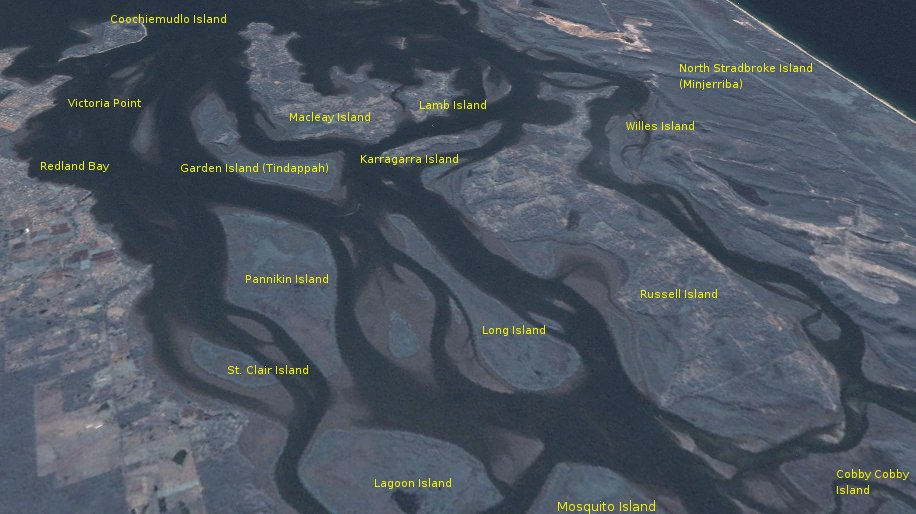
Satellite view from the southwest of Southern Moreton Bay, Queensland – labelled are the many islands created from the outflow of the Logan River behind the barrier of North and South Stradbroke Islands

Although most of the population resides on the main urban conglomeration based around the centres of Capalaba, Cleveland and Victoria Point, over 6,000 people live on islands in Moreton Bay that are part of the city. These are North Stradbroke, Coochiemudlo and the Southern Moreton Bay Islands of Karragarra, Lamb, Russell and Macleay. Tingalpa Creek rises on Mount Cotton, forming Leslie Harrison Dam, and marking the majority of the area's western boundary.

== Biogeography ==
Redland City has many immediately recognisable animals and plants such as koalas, migratory shorebirds, flying foxes and scribbly gum forests. It is also home to over 1,700 other recorded native species, many of which are under threat from population growth and its associated effects such as habitat clearing and fragmentation, road construction, pollution and expanding development. The council area is also home to Venman Bushland National Park, and the Eprapah Scout environment training centre.

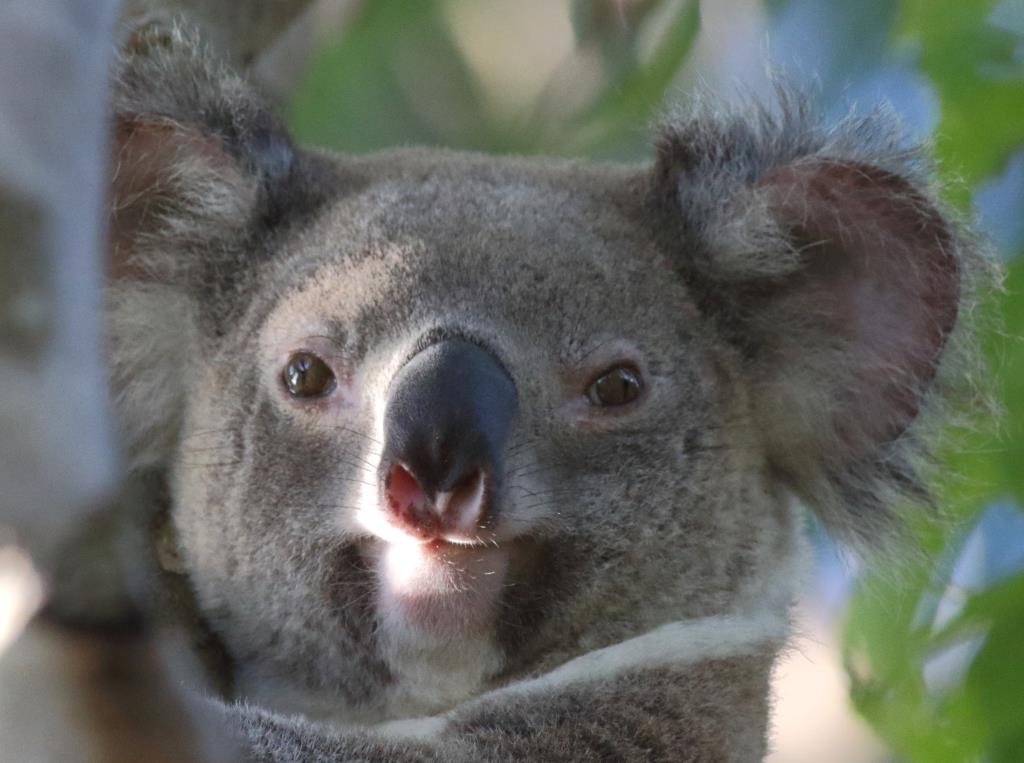
One of Redland City's koalas

In April 2013, the Redland City Council illegally cleared vegetation from public land on the foreshores of Moreton Bay. The council has been required by the State Government to restore the cleared vegetation and install signage about the restoration. Trees felled included many sheoaks.

The city's koala population has declined significantly in recent years. In 2010, it was estimated that only 2,000 koalas remained, a 65% decline since 1999. Figures from a count in 2012 have not yet been released by the Queensland Government. The Redland City-based Koala Action Group has warned that: "Rampant expansion of urban areas will lead to the loss of the koala populations that are vital to the long-term survival of the species."

The city boundaries include internationally significant coastal wetlands within the Moreton Bay Ramsar site. Tidal flats, mangroves and seagrass beds provide important habitats for fish, crustaceans, and:

- large numbers of the nationally threatened green turtle and the loggerhead turtle
- the internationally vulnerable dugong, a large sea mammal from the order Sirenia which also includes manatee species

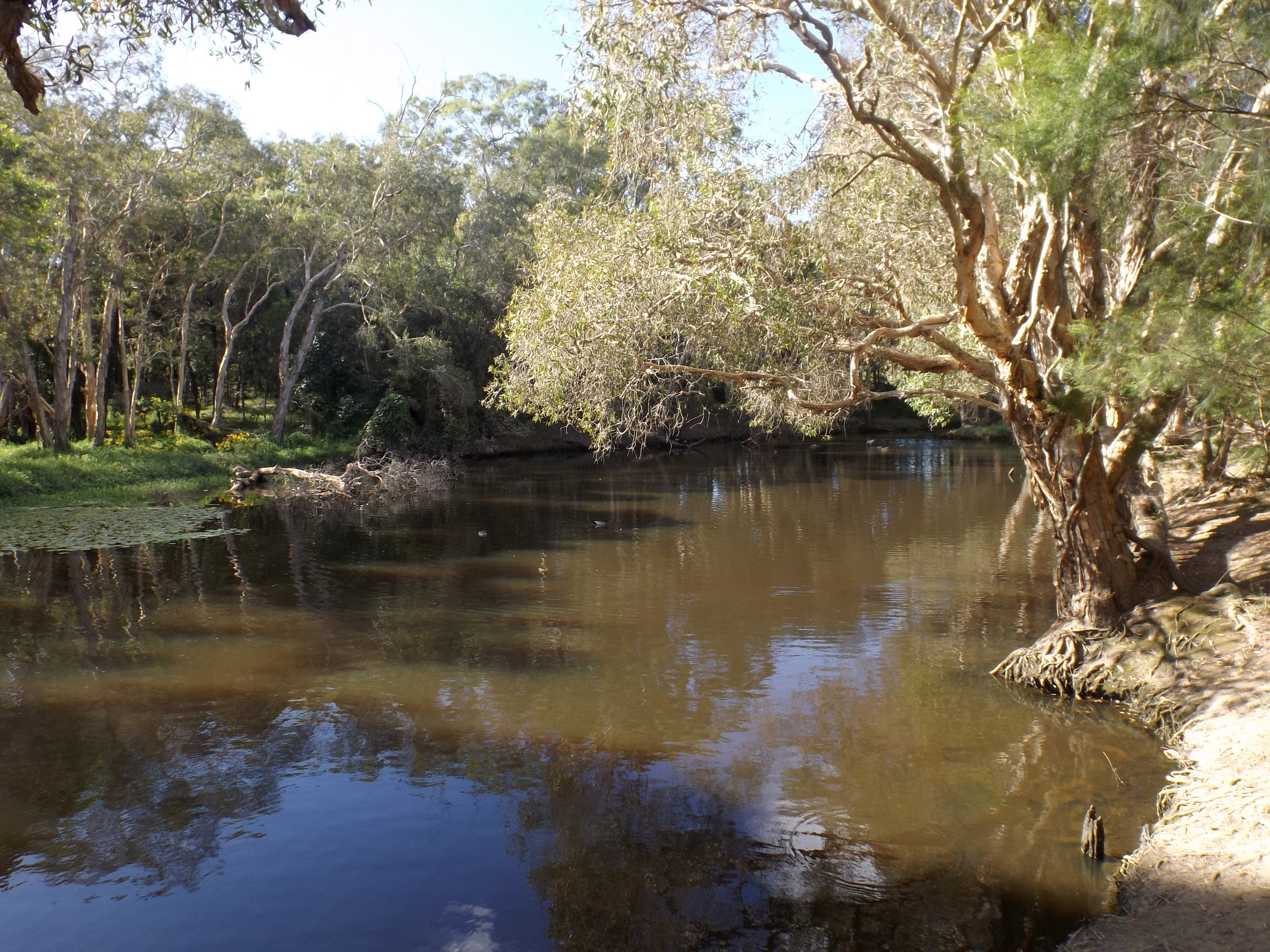
Hilliards Creek, flowing from Moreton Bay, separating the suburbs of Wellington Point (left) and Ormiston (right)

- 43 species of shorebirds, including 30 migratory bird species listed by international migratory bird conservation agreements, such as the vulnerable eastern curlew and the grey-tailed tattler, that use this area in their journey through the East Asian–Australasian Flyway.

Freshwater systems in the Redlands catchment do not meet set ecosystem health values, according to the Healthy Waterways Report Cards for both 2013 and 2014.

Fire ants have been detected in a number of Redland City suburbs, with Sheldon and Mount Cotton being assessed by BioSecurity Queensland as high-risk, and requiring treatment by ground teams.

== Transport ==
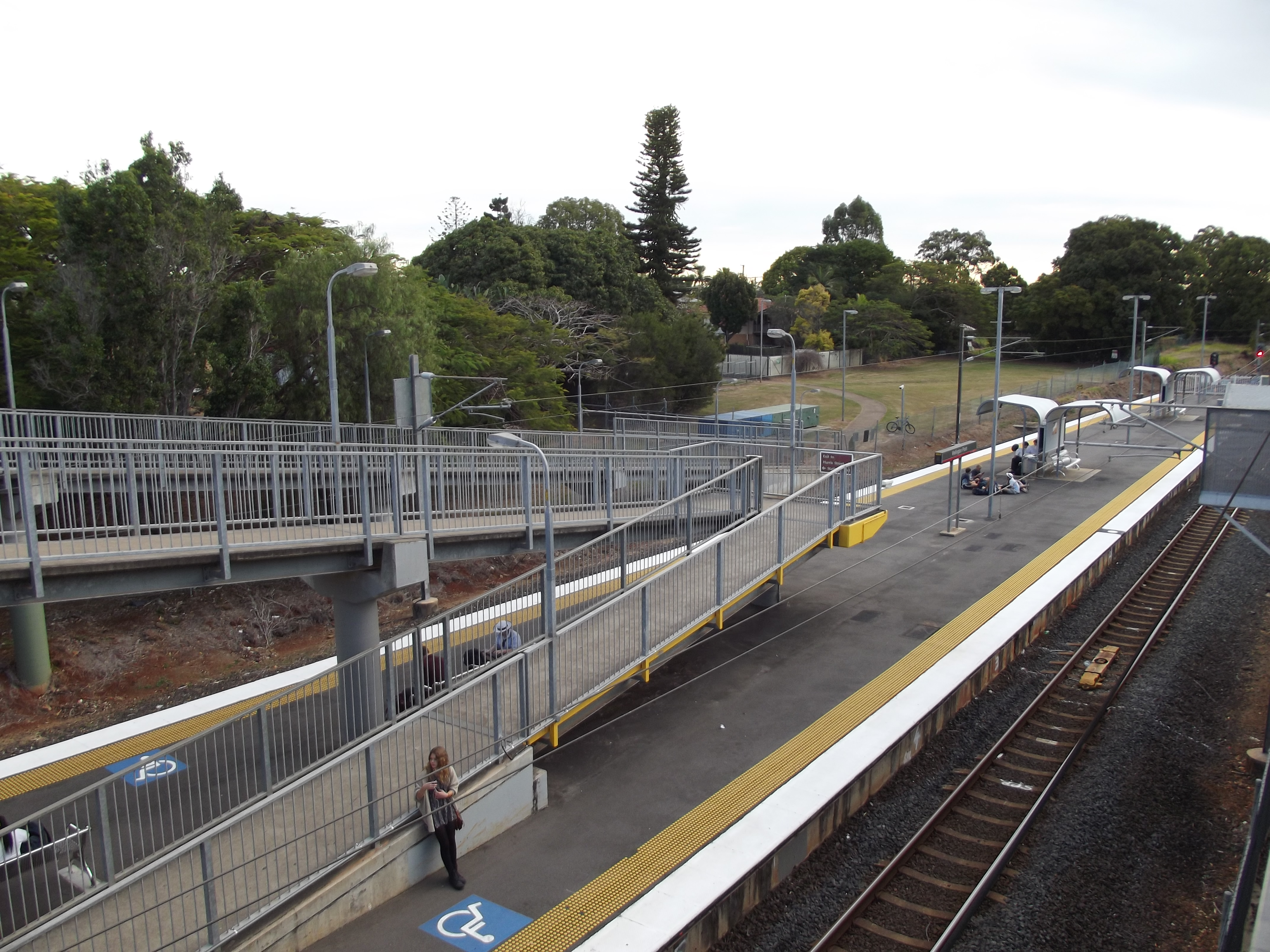
Wellington Point station, the Redlands' third stop along the Cleveland line

Queensland Rail operates the Cleveland railway line, which connects the Redlands with Brisbane as part of its City network. The line runs parallel with the Brisbane River to its south, passing through Brisbane's Cannon Hill and Wynnum, before crossing Tingalpa Creek to enter Redland City. Northern suburbs of the city are serviced by five stations: Thorneside, Birkdale, Wellington Point, Ormiston, and Cleveland, where the line terminates.

The TransLink (South East Queensland) bus network is prevalent in the Redlands. Bus stations at Capalaba and Victoria Point feature regular city-bound and outbound connections, with direct services to Carindale, Eight Mile Plains, Loganholme, and the Brisbane CBD during peak hour.

Plans for extending the Eastern Busway to Capalaba bus station were "paused" in 2011 but a new planning study commenced in 2022.

The Gateway Motorway and Pacific Motorway are located further west within the City of Brisbane. Major roads are accessible from these highways, such as Old Cleveland Road, Mount Gravatt-Capalaba Road, and Mount Cotton Road, which enter the Redlands from Chandler, Burbank, and Cornubia, respectively.

== Culture and heritage ==
Redland Museum, viewed from the Cleveland Showgrounds

Redland City has a number of important cultural facilities, including the Redland Art Gallery, Redland Museum, and Redland Performing Arts Centre.

The city also has many heritage-listed sites, including:

- Multiple historic sites of Cleveland, such as the Cleveland Point Light, Old Cleveland Police Station, Cleveland Pioneer Cemetery, Grand View Hotel, and the historic pine trees near the Point
- The church, public hall, causeway and public reserve in Dunwich, North Stradbroke Island
- Whepstead Manor at Wellington Point
- The Industrial Ruins on Macleay Island
- The Ormiston House Estate and Fellmongery
- Norfolk Island Pine Trees
- Serpentine Creek Road Cemetery in Redland Bay.

=== Libraries ===
The Redland City Council operate public libraries at Amity Point, Capalaba, Cleveland, Dunwich, Point Lookout, Russell Island and Victoria Point. There is a mobile library serving Alexandra Hills, Mount Cotton Park, Redland Bay, Thorneside, Victoria Point, and Wellington Point.

== Economy ==
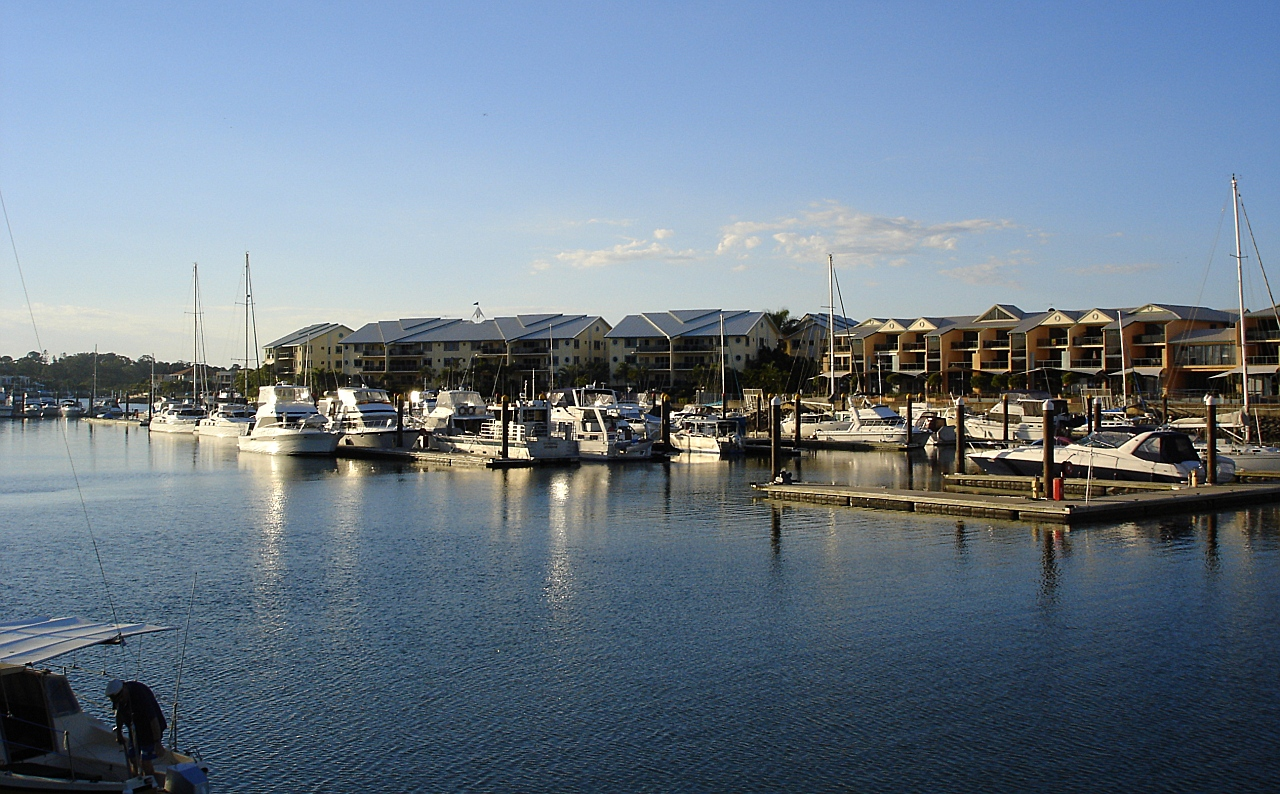
Raby Bay Marina, viewed from the centre of Cleveland

For the year ending 30 June 2014, Redland City's Gross Regional Product (GRP) was estimated to be 4.77 billion dollars.

Year (Ending June)	Redland City – % Change in GRP	Queensland – % Change in GRP
2014	1.7	1.7
2013	1.7	2.6
2012	5.0	6.2
2011	1.6	0.7
2010	2.0	0.0
2009	1.0	0.6

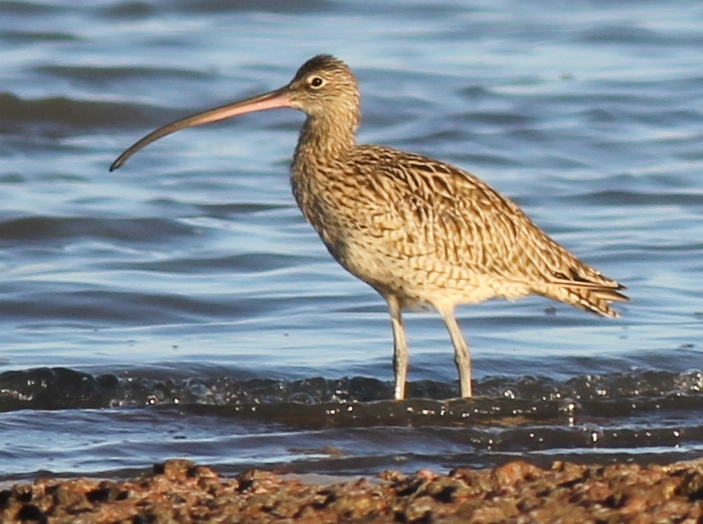
Eastern curlew visiting the shore of Cleveland

Key industry sectors include health care and social assistance, retail trade, education and training, sand mining, construction and tourism.

During the year ending in June 2014, an estimated 41,506 jobs were located in Redland City, along with an estimated 74,089 employed residents, meaning 32,035 (or 47.1%) of Redland City's employed residents who work travel outside of the area to do so.

Year (Ending June)	Redland City – Employed Residents	Redland City – Local Jobs
2014	74,089	41,506
2013	74,141	41,788
2012	74,633	43,138
2011	73,863	43,485
2010	73,033	42,888
2009	73,207	41,829

=== Mining ===
North Stradbroke Island, one of the world's largest sand islands, has been the subject of sand mining operations since 1949. In 2010, Queensland's Labor Government announced a phase-out of the sand mining industry over a 17-year period, with up to 80% of the island to be covered by national park. In April 2011, the government then extended key expired mining leases to allow mining to continue at the main Enterprise sand mine until the end of 2019, while Sibelco was interested in an extension to 2027. 2013 saw the LNP Government pass legislation allowing sand mining on the island for an extra 16 years: from 2019 to 2035. For mining to continue past 2019 at the Enterprise sand mine, the lease owner (currently Sibelco) would have to apply for an extension in 2019, under legislative amendments passed by the Newman Government in November 2013. However, if the amendments are repealed by a future government before 2019, the mine will close on 31 December 2019, the closure date legislated by the government in April 2011.

The circumstances leading up to this legislative amendment have been referred to Queensland's Crime and Misconduct Commission. On 6 June 2014, North Stradbroke Island's traditional owners, the Quandamooka people, initiated a legal challenge saying, on the grounds that the LNP Government's extension of mining contravened the Federal Native Title Act. In May 2016, legislation passed by the Palaszczuk Ministry did confirm that sand mining on North Stradbroke will end by 2019.

Mainland quarries are located in the suburb of Mount Cotton, and have drawn their own criticisms concerning allegations of pollution and OHS breaches.

=== Development ===
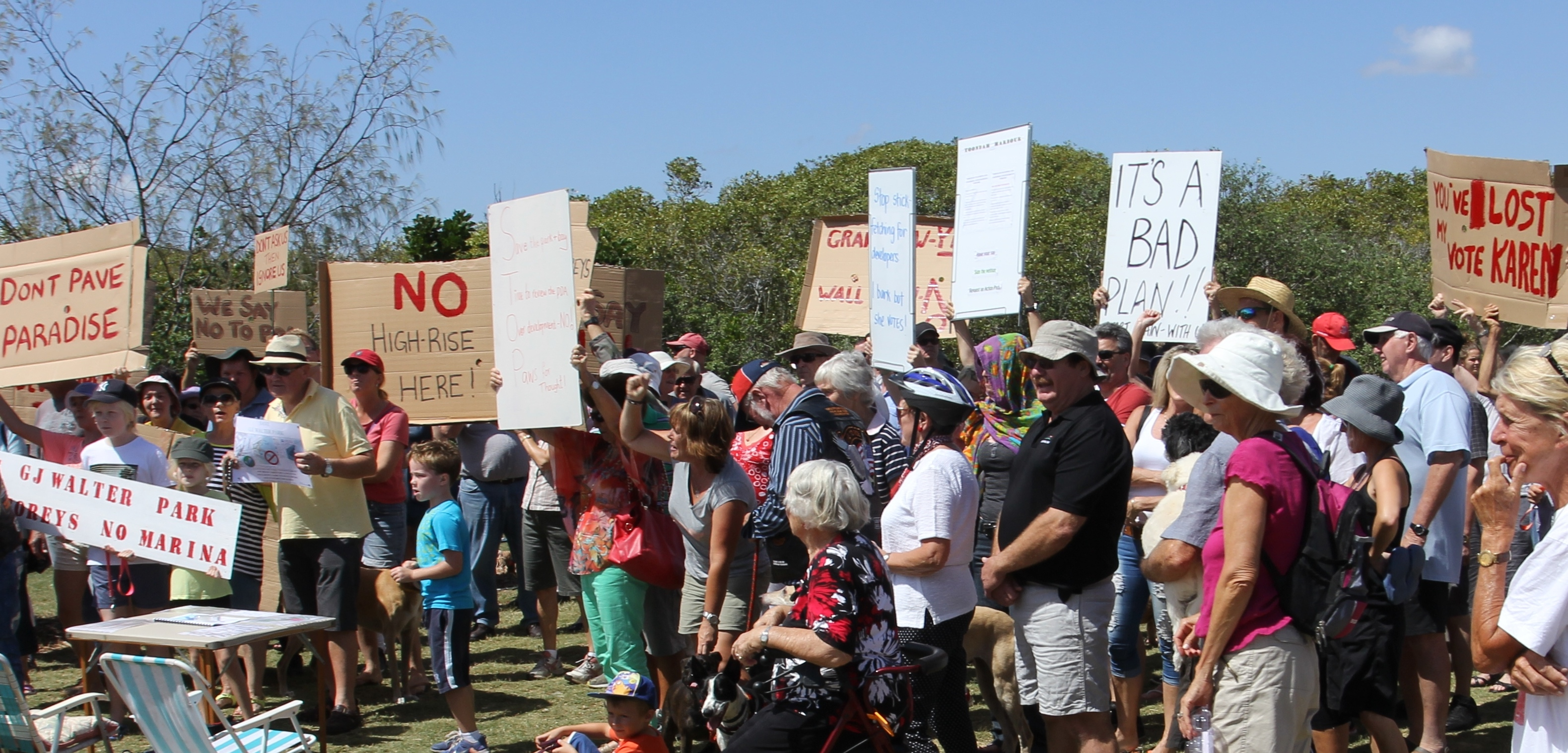
Protest against the planned marina and high-rise buildings in Cleveland

Toondah Harbour in Cleveland is the location of the Stradbroke Island Ferry Terminal, used by water taxis and vehicular ferries to provide access to North Stradbroke Island. Cleveland's Toondah Harbour and Redland Bay's Weinam Creek were declared Priority Development Areas (PDAs) under the Economic Development Act 2012 on 21 June 2013. PDA designation allows development to be fast-tracked, but also means that local communities and interest groups have less opportunity to comment on issues of concern.

The Government and Redland City Council have proposed PDA development schemes which have attracted community opposition. On 23 February, approximately 30 people attended a rally to protest against the Government's plans to "carve up" the G.J. Walter Park as part of its Toondah Harbour redevelopment proposal. On 4 March 2014 a petition with 1,211 signatures calling for the Government's Toondah Harbour PDA plan to be withdrawn was tabled in the Queensland Parliament.

On 31 May 2014, an approved development scheme was released together with a lengthy report on the 583 submissions received during the consultation period.

On 18 September 2014, the Government and Council announced that Walker Corporation had been selected as preferred developer for both the Toondah Harbour and Weinam Creek priority development areas.

In the 2016 census, the population of the Redland City was 147,010. The median age was 41 years old, 3 years older than the nationwide median. The male-to-female ratio was 49-to-51. The most commonly nominated ancestries were English (32.1%), Australian (25.2%), Irish (9.0%), Scottish (8.6%), and German (4.5%). 72.5% of people were born in Australia, while the other most common countries of birth were England (6.7%), New Zealand (5.4%), South Africa (1.7%), Scotland (0.9%), and the Philippines (0.5%). Indigenous Australians accounted for 2.3% of the population. The most commonly spoken languages other than English were Afrikaans and Mandarin (0.5% each), German (0.4%), and Italian and Spanish (0.3% each). The most common religious affiliations reported were none (29.8%), Catholic (21.1%), Anglican (17.9%), and Uniting Church (6.1%).

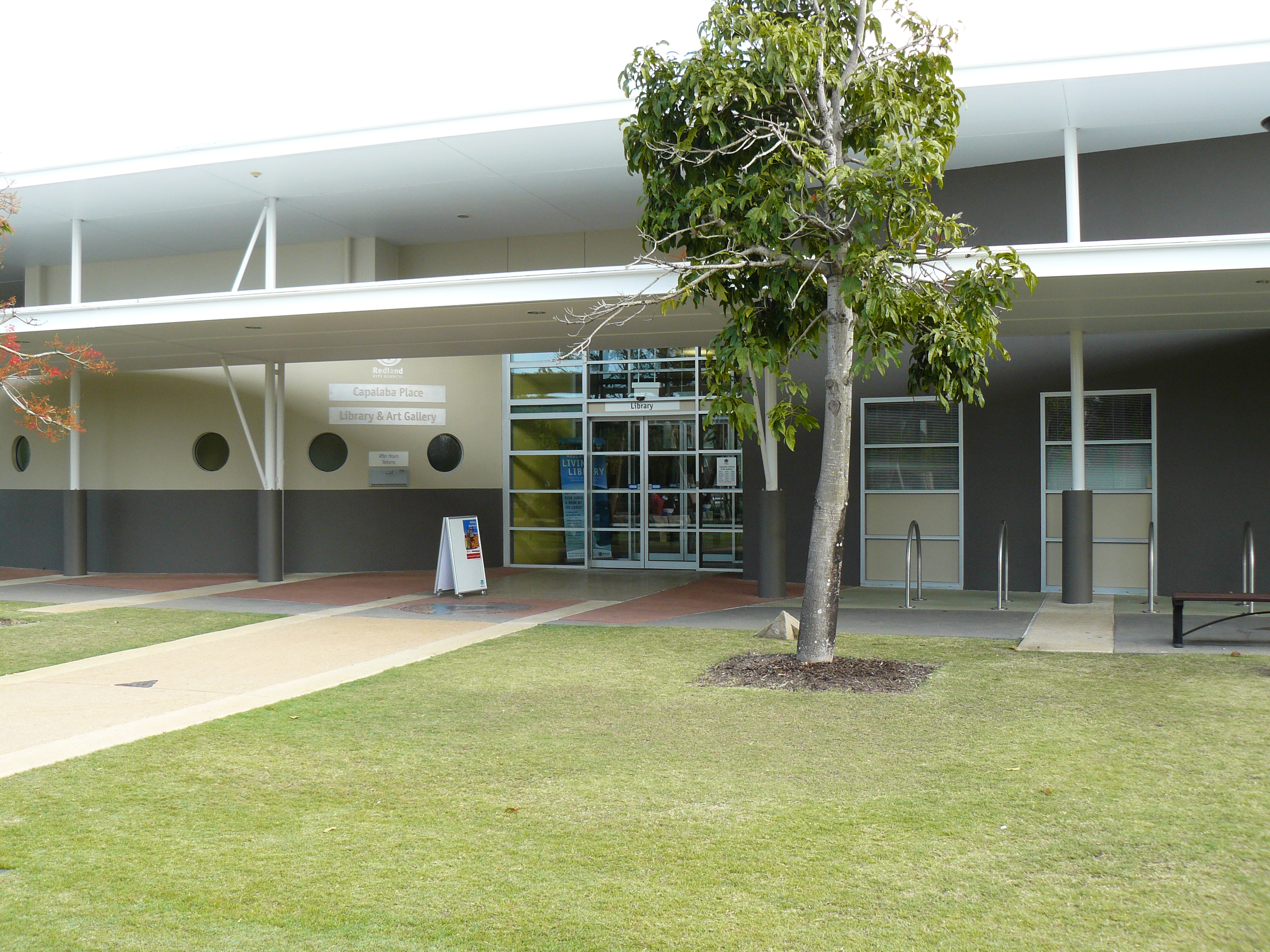
Entrance to the Capalaba Library, 2008

== Council ==
Redland City Council has a Mayor, and a Councillor for each of its 10 divisions. Elections are held every four years and voting is compulsory.

Jos Mitchell was elected mayor at the 2024 election.

Councillor	Declared political membership	Term	Constituency
Jos Mitchell	Independent	2024–present	Mayor
Wendy Boglary	Independent	2008–present	Division 1
Peter Mitchell	Independent	2016–present	Division 2
Paul Gollè	Independent	2016–present	Division 3
Lance Hewlett	Independent	2012–present	Division 4
Shane Rendalls	Independent	2024–present	Division 5
Julie Talty	Independent	2012–present	Division 6
Rowanne McKenzie	Independent	2020–present	Division 7
Tracey Huges	Independent Labor	2016–present	Division 8
Jason Colley	Independent	2024–present	Division 9
Paul Bishop	Independent	2012–present	Division 10

== Mayors ==
Other notable members of the Redland Council include:

- 1961–1980: John Philip Goleby, Member of the Queensland Legislative Assembly for Redlands

== Suburbs ==
Redland City consists of the following suburbs and localities:

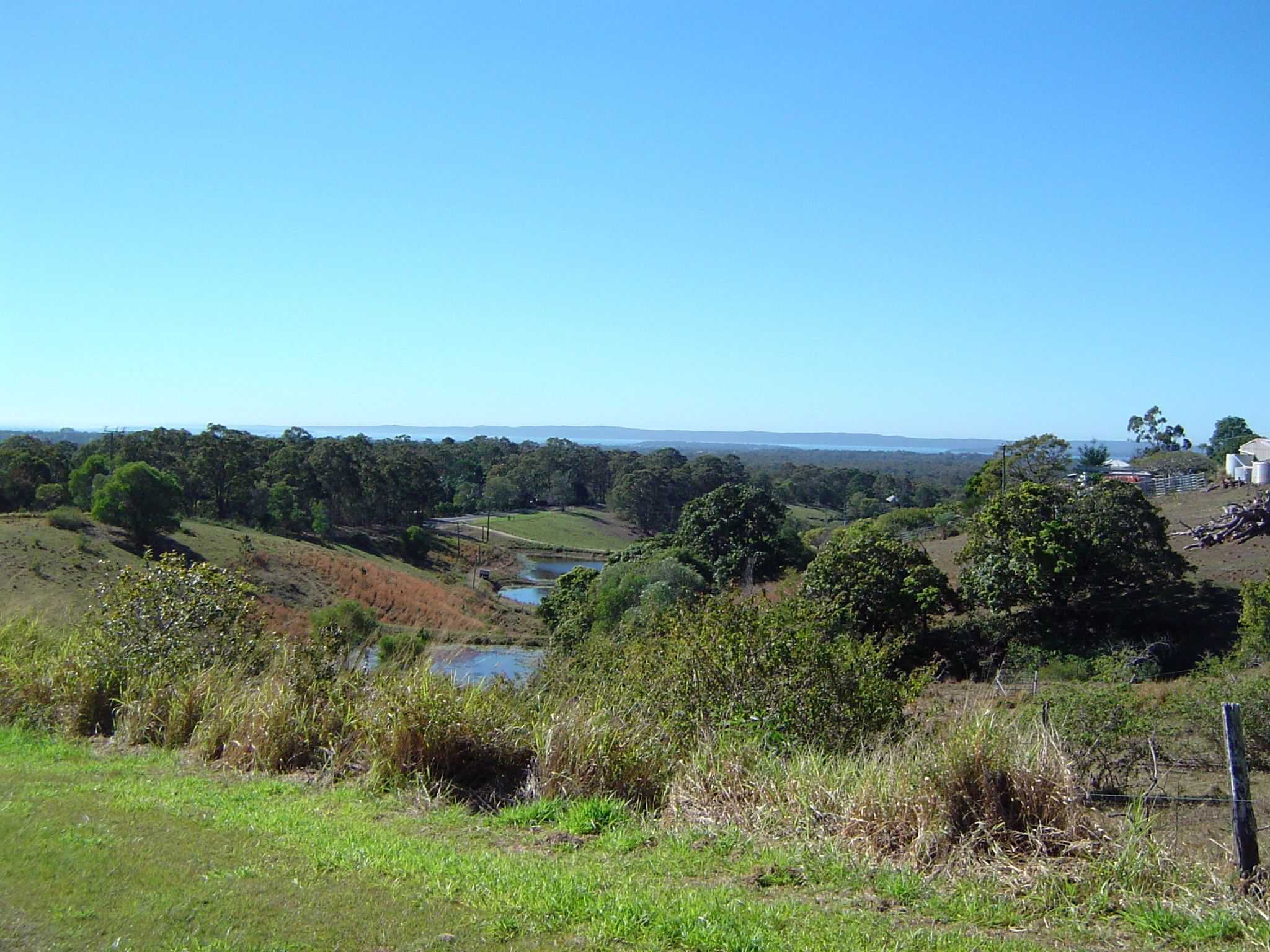
View east, towards Redland and Moreton Bay, from Mount Cotton, 2014

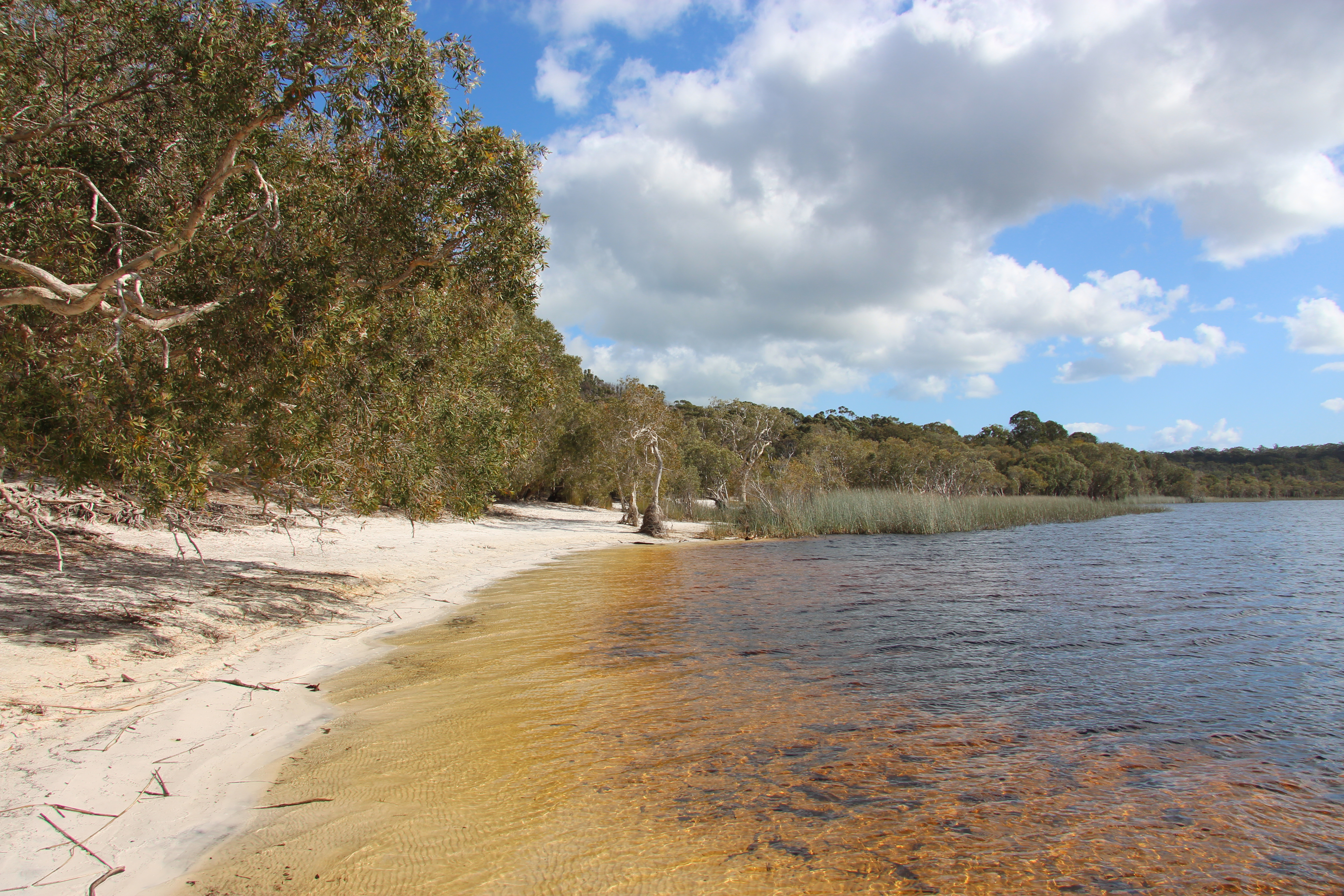
Shoreline of Brown Lake on North Stradbroke Island

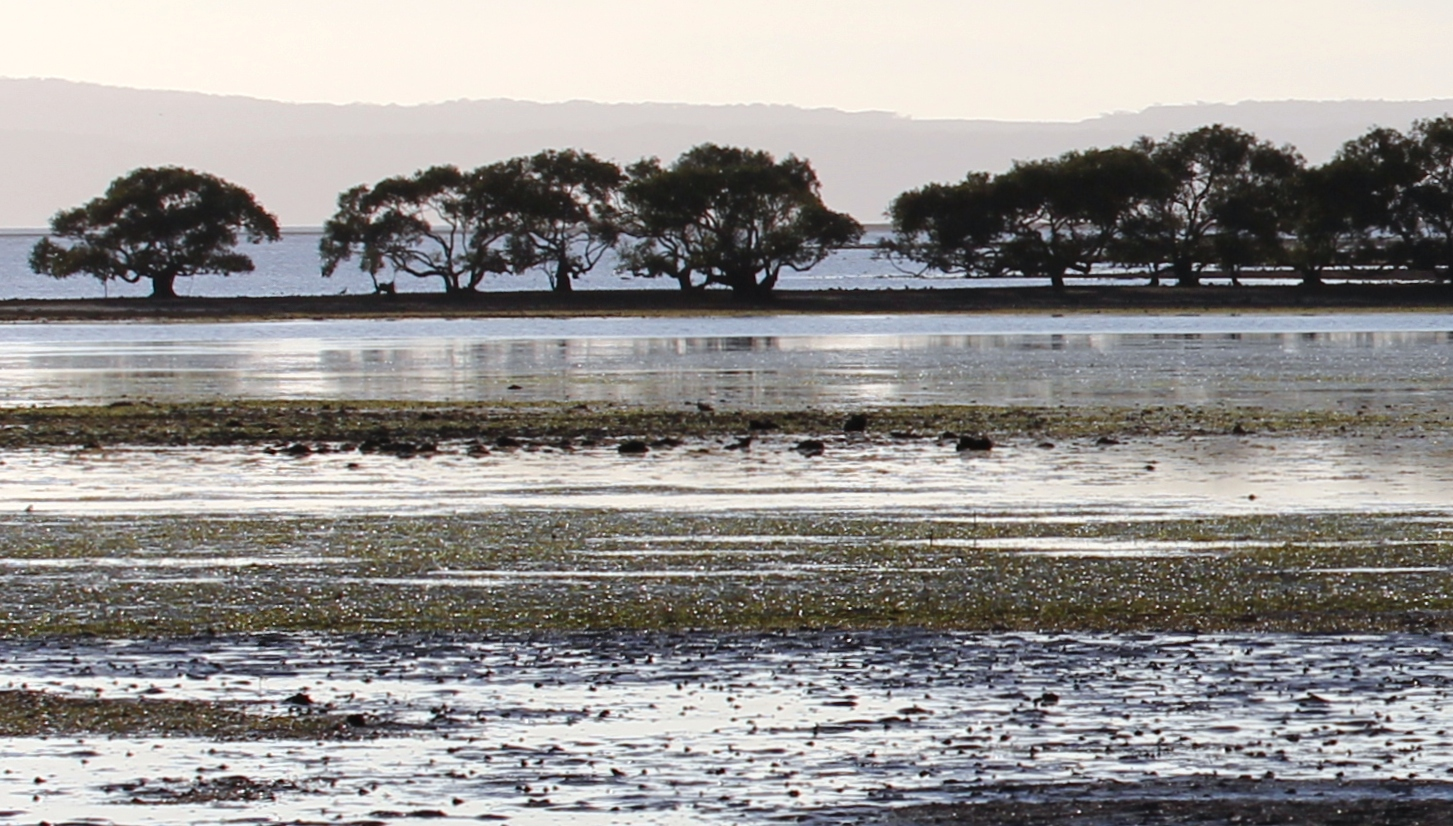
Cassim Island, viewed from G.J. Walter Park in Cleveland

- Alexandra Hills
- Birkdale
- Capalaba
- Cleveland
- Coochiemudlo Island
- Mount Cotton
- North Stradbroke Island
  - Amity Point
  - Dunwich
  - Point Lookout
- Ormiston
- Redland Bay
- Sheldon
- Southern Moreton Bay Islands
  - Karragarra Island
  - Lamb Island
  - Macleay Island
  - Russell Island
- Thorneside
- Thornlands
- Victoria Point
- Wellington Point

Redland City also includes a number of uninhabited or sparsely populated islands in Moreton Bay, including:

- Peel Island
- Cassim Island, near Cleveland: a low-lying area of mangroves with seagrass around it which provides a high value habitat for wading birds and other fauna, named after William Cassim, an early Cleveland hotel keeper.

== Demographics ==
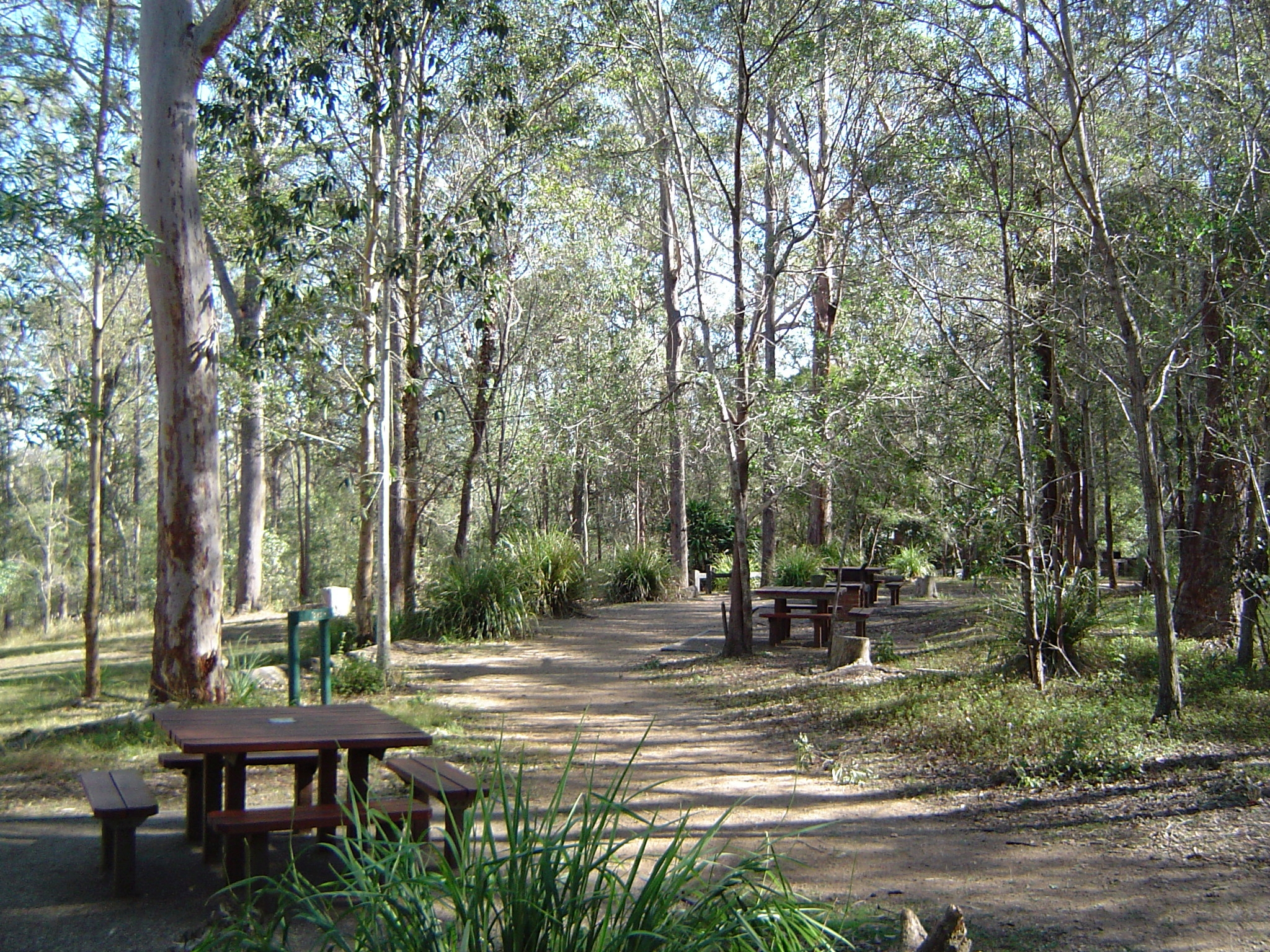
Picnic area of Venman Bushland National Park in Mount Cotton

The following table lists of the population of Redland City and its predecessor local government areas:

Year	Population	Notes
1911	957	
1933	2398	
1947	5,211	
1954	7,365	
1961	10000	
1966	12,632	
1971	16,424	
1976	27,539	
1981	42,527	
1986	58,501	
1991	80,690	
1996	100,101	
2001	113,811	
2006	127,627	
2011	138,666	
2016	147,010	
2021	159,222	
