= Karragarra Island, Queensland =

Karragarra Island
- Town
- Coordinates: 27.6375°S 153.3727°E
- Country: Australia
- State: Queensland
- LGA: Redland City

Government
  - State electorate: Redlands
  - Federal division: Bowman

Area
  - Total: 2.4 km^{2} (0.93 sq mi)

Population
  - Total: 204 (2016 census locality)
  - Density: 85.0/km^{2} (220/sq mi)
- Time zone: UTC+10:00 (AEST)
- Postcode: 4184
Localities around Karragarra Island
Macleay Island	Lamb Island	Moreton Bay
Moreton Bay	Karragarra Island	Russell Island
Moreton Bay	Russell Island	Russell Island

Karragarra Island is one of the inhabited islands in the Moreton Bay near Brisbane, in Queensland, Australia. It is also a town and locality in the City of Redland, Queensland, Australia. In the 2016 census the locality of Karragarra Island had a population of 204 people.

== Geography ==
Krummel Passage is a channel to the south of the island separating it from Russell Island (27.6436°S 153.3759°E).

There is no bridge to the island. Most transport is by boat with vehicular and passenger ferry services available. There is also a helipad on the foreshore park opposite 96 The Esplanade (27.6362°S 153.3698°E) which can be used for medical emergencies.

== History ==
At the 2011 census Karragarra Island had a population of 160 people.

In the 2016 census the locality of Karragarra Island had a population of 204 people.

== Education ==
There are no schools on the island. The nearest primary schools are Macleay Island State School on Macleay Island to the east and Russell Island State School on Russell Island to the south-west. The nearest secondary school is Victoria Point State High School at Victoria Point on the mainland. These schools can be accessed by ferry.

== Amenities ==
The Karragarra Island Rural Fire Brigade Station is at 11A Noyes Parade (27.6368°S 153.3702°E).

There is a boat ramp (27.6353°S 153.3619°E) and pontoon (27.6352°S 153.3632°E) opposite the Karragarra Island Foreshore Park at 176-180 The Esplanade on the north-west side of the island. It is managed by the Redland City Council. It is the ferry terminal for ferries between the islands (free service) and to the mainland (paid service).

== Demographics ==
In the 2011 census, Karragarra Island recorded a population of 160 people, 51.2% female and 48.8% male. The median age of the Karragarra Island population was 61 years, 24 years above the national median of 37. 65.2% of people living in Karragarra Island were born in Australia. The other top responses for country of birth were England 7.5%, New Zealand 4.3%, Scotland 3.1%, Zimbabwe 3.1%, Croatia 2.5%. 87.7% of people spoke only English at home; the next most common languages were 1.8% Croatian, 1.8% Finnish, 1.8% Arabic.
