= Russell Island (Moreton Bay) =

Russell Island Canaipa Moreton Bay, Queensland
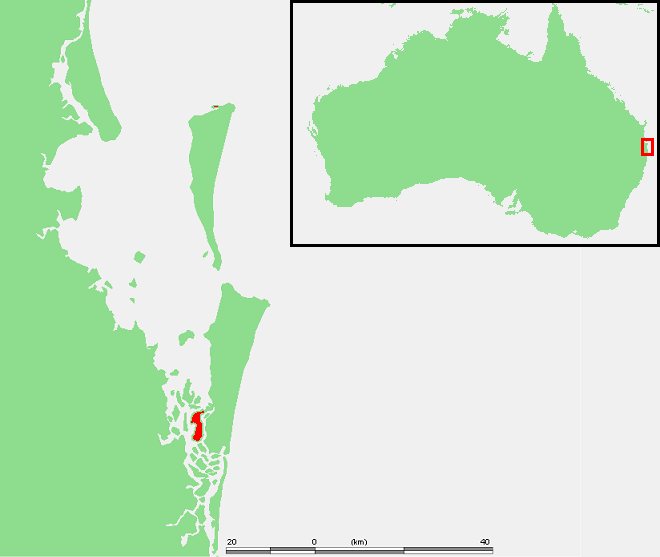
- Location of Russell Island

- Coordinates: 27.6730°S 153.3847°E
- Population: 3,698 (2021 census)
  - Density: 122.45/km^{2} (317.1/sq mi)
- Established: 1870
- Postcode(s): 4184
- Area: 30.2 km^{2} (11.7 sq mi)
- Time zone: AEST (UTC+10:00)
- LGA(s): Redland City
- State electorate(s): Redlands
- Federal division(s): Bowman
Localities around Russell Island:
| Moreton Bay | Karragarra Island | North Stradbroke Island |
| Moreton Bay | Russell Island | North Stradbroke Island |
| Southern Moreton Bay Islands | Southern Moreton Bay Islands | North Stradbroke Island |

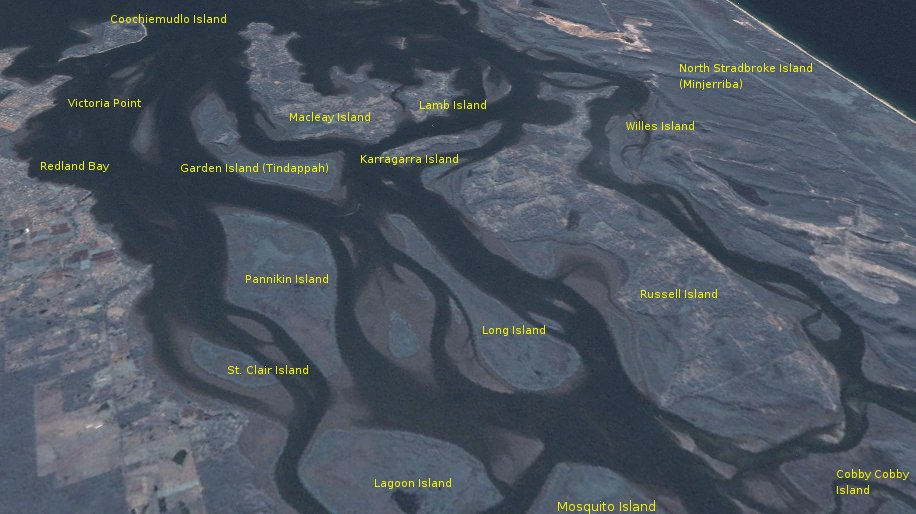
Russell Island in Moreton Bay

Russell Island is an island, a town and a locality in the City of Redland, Queensland, Australia. The island is also known by its traditional Aboriginal name of Canaipa (from (Yugambeh: Ganaybah); meaning place of digging stick or ironbark spear). In the 2021 census, the locality of Russell Island had a population of 3,698 people.

== Geography ==
Russell Island in Redland City is the biggest of the Southern Moreton Bay Islands, situated between the mainland and North Stradbroke Island. The island is eight kilometres long (north-to-south) and nearly three kilometres wide. The channel separating it from the mainland is known as Main Channel and the channel separating it from North Stradbroke Island is known as Canaipa Passage.

Russell Island has the following headlands (from north to south):

- Canaipa Point, on the north-east of the island (27.6417°S 153.4159°E)
- Kibbinkibbinwa Point, on the north of the island (27.6421°S 153.3905°E)
- Rocky Point, on the south-east of the island (27.6962°S 153.3657°E)

Russell Island has the following passages (from north to south):

- Krummel Passage, to the north of the island (27.6436°S 153.3759°E)
- Main Channel, to the west of the island (27.6863°S 153.3639°E)
- Fishermans Channel, to the south of the island (27.7092°S 153.3771°E)

== History ==
A basic survey of the island was conducted by Robert Dixon in 1839. He named the island after Lord John Russell the Secretary of State for the Colonies in the 1840s.

The island was first settled by Europeans in 1866, when John Campbell was granted a lease on the northern end of the island closely followed by John Willes and his family. Land auctions commenced in 1870. Farmers and oystermen were the first full-time inhabitants, but with the arrival of the Jackson family in 1906, a small village was created on the western side of the island called Jacksonville, that had a sawmill, pineapple canning factory, jetty and even a picture theatre.

Russell Island State School was officially opened on Thursday 20 January 1916 by James Stodart, member of the Queensland Legislative Assembly for Logan. It opened for lessons on Monday 24 January 1916 under 17-year-old head teacher Miss Eileen Willes. The school building had been relocated from Pine Ridge (near Southport). It was 21 by 14 feet (6.4 by 4.3 m) and was on the eastern side of Centre Road (approx 27.6698°S 153.3845°E) in almost the centre of the island. In the first year, there were 17 children from 8 families. In 1927 following a vote by residents, the school was relocated to its present site in the north of the island. The school continues to use the original building, albeit extended and repaired. In 1931 a special school boat was employed to transport children from the surrounding islands (Lamb, Macleay and Karragarra) and convey them to the Russell Island State School.

Russell Island Methodist Church opened on Saturday 18 December 1920 in Jackson Road. It is no longer extant.

Russell Island is known for the infamous land scams of the early 1970s, when many of the islands farms were divided into over 20,000 blocks. At the time, the area, with a population of less than 500, did not have a local authority enforcing planning regulations. Heavily advertised and sold off by unscrupulous vendors, these blocks were often not where the unwary customers thought they were buying. It all rode on the vague promise of a bridge from the National Party government at the time. Media reports exposing the scam pointed to blocks that were underwater at high tide and the lack of public land.

The Russell Island Public Library opened in 2001.

On 12 April 2008, a public 25 metre swimming pool jointly funded by the Redland City Council, the Queensland State Government, a rates levy and nearly 20 years of donations from residents was completed. Management has been contracted to the YMCA. The first bathers hit the water during that weekend but, lacking any heating, it was closed for the winter. Sufficient solar heating for spring and autumn use was installed in 2009.

Another big event for the island on Wednesday, 7 May 2008 when the $1.2 million Police Station was opened by the Queensland Police Minister, bringing Senior Constable Michael Verry to the island as its first community policeman. Backing up the policeman, Queensland Police make frequent visits to the island with a high-speed barge which can carry two police vehicles.

In 2015, the Russell Island residents groups, together with the Redland City Council, proposed to transition the island's name to its traditional Aboriginal equivalent – Canaipa. The proposal is that the two names of Canaipa and Russell Island will be used with the island's name reverting to its traditional name once it becomes more widely accepted. The name Canaipa was provided from Yugambeh people and identified as a Yugambeh-Bundjalung language word from the Ngaraangbal dialect spoken by the Pimpama clan meaning place of ironbark spear/digging stick, the name is used by both the Quandamooka and Yugambeh people, who assert traditional ownership. The move is motivated by the desire to improve public perceptions (and hence real estate values) which were damaged by the earlier land scams. The Queensland Government officially adopted Canaipa as an alternative name for the island, but it is not an alternative name for the town or the locality.

In 2023, a house fire on Russell Island killed a father and his five sons. Similarly, another house on Russell Island caught fire a few months later. No-one was home at the time. All affected houses have since been demolished.

== Demographics ==
In the 2006 census, Russell Island had a population of 1,779 people, up 35.9% since 2001. However, this changes dramatically on weekends and holidays when many of the 30% of dwellings on the island which are classified as unoccupied are visited by their owners.

In the 2011 census, Russell Island had a population of 2,473 people, 50.3% female and 49.7% male The median age of the Russell Island population was 51 years, 14 years above the national median of 37. 68.8% of people living in Russell Island were born in Australia. The other top responses for country of birth were New Zealand 6.1%, England 5.7%, Scotland 1%, Philippines 1%, Germany 0.9%. 85.8% of people spoke only English at home; the next most common languages were 0.5% Hungarian, 0.4% German, 0.4% Filipino, 0.4% French, 0.3% Croatian.

In the 2016 census, Russell Island had a population of 2,836 people.

In the 2021 census, Russell Island had a population of 3,698 people.

== Heritage listings ==
Russell Island has a number of heritage-listed sites, including:

- Mrs Fischer’s Grave, Canaipa Ridge Road (27.684°S 153.385°E)
- St Peter’s Anglican Parish Hall, 25-27 High Street (27.6480°S 153.3815°E)
- Jacksonville (Jacksons Oval), corner Jackson Road and Esplanade (27.658°S 153.367°E)
- Corduroy Road, Weedmore Road

== Education ==
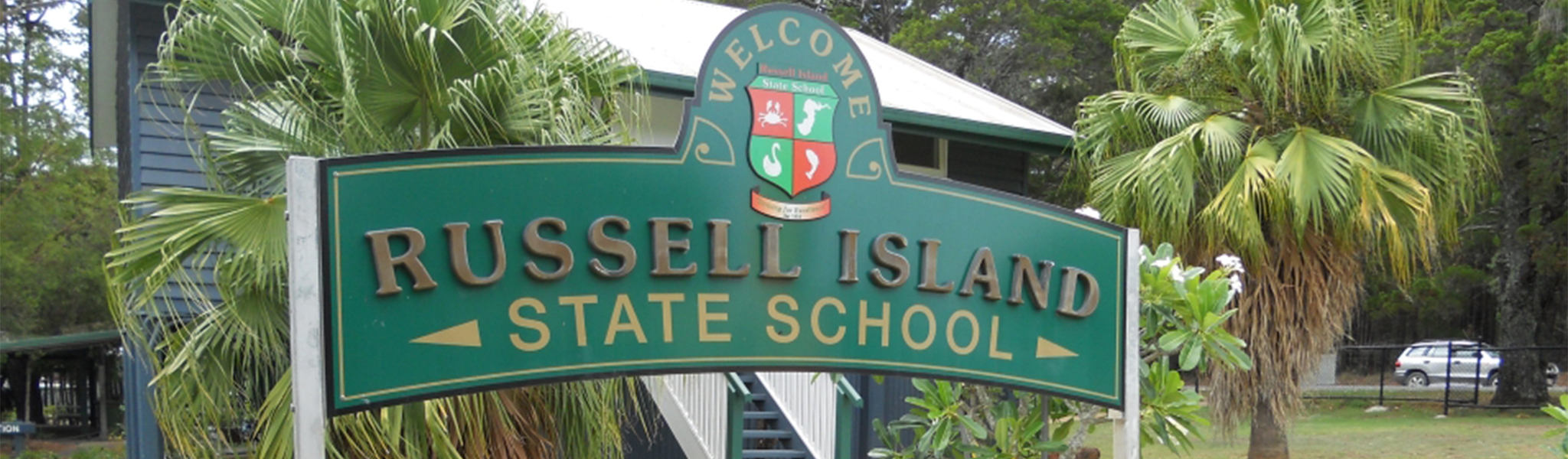
Russell Island State School, 2022

Russell Island State School is a government primary (Prep-6) school for boys and girls at 38-64 High Street (27.6515°S 153.3813°E). In 2017, the school had an enrolment of 176 students with 18 teachers (14 full-time equivalent) and 18 non-teaching staff (8 full-time equivalent). In 2018, the school had an enrolment of 174 students with 17 teachers (14 full-time equivalent) and 18 non-teaching staff (8 full-time equivalent). It includes a special education program. The school has an active Parents and Citizens club.

There are no secondary schools on Russell Island. The nearest government secondary school is Victoria Point State High School at Victoria Point on the mainland to the north-west.

== Facilities ==
Russell Island has a small shopping village offering a variety of services including; Super IGA supermarket, post office, Medical Practice, petrol station, chemist, hairdressers, newsagent, kebab shop and takeaway food shop. It also has several real estate agencies showing houses for sale and rent.

Russell Island has most of the same services as the mainland that span across the island including a police station, fire station, ambulance service, medical practice, pathologist, service station, post office, hairdresser, veterinarian, computer repair services, web designers, video hire, bottle shop, lawyer, public pool, various real estate agents, landscape/hire centre, storage sheds, car hire, cafes, motor inn and a sports/recreational complex.

The two licensed clubs, an RSL and the Russell Island Bowling Club, provide entertainment and bistro facilities most nights of the week.

The Redland Library service operates the Russell Island Public Library which is located at 22 High Street.

A Council-built hall near the main wharf is available and, centrally located on Jackson Street, the Bay Islands Community Centre has rooms. Some church denominations meet at the hall but others use the historic St Peter's Church Hall just up High Street. In 2009 the Kennedy Farm Community Centre was revamped with Commonwealth money and is now available for small scale community activity. Resident driven plans for the 4.5 ha block include sporting facilities and a community farm.

Electricians, builders and plumbers are resident on the Island, making the island somewhat self-supporting. Services include power, phone, broadband, water and garbage collection. Garbage is trucked to the mainland for disposal. The Rural Fire Brigade, State Emergency Service and the Ambulance service receive strong volunteer support. Several volunteer Justices of the Peace live on the island. In early 2010 the Bay Islands Community Centre with grants from Community Service and the Council, opened a youth drop-in centre on Jackson Road.

== See also ==
- List of islands of Australia
