= Victoria Point, Queensland =

Victoria Point Redland City, Queensland
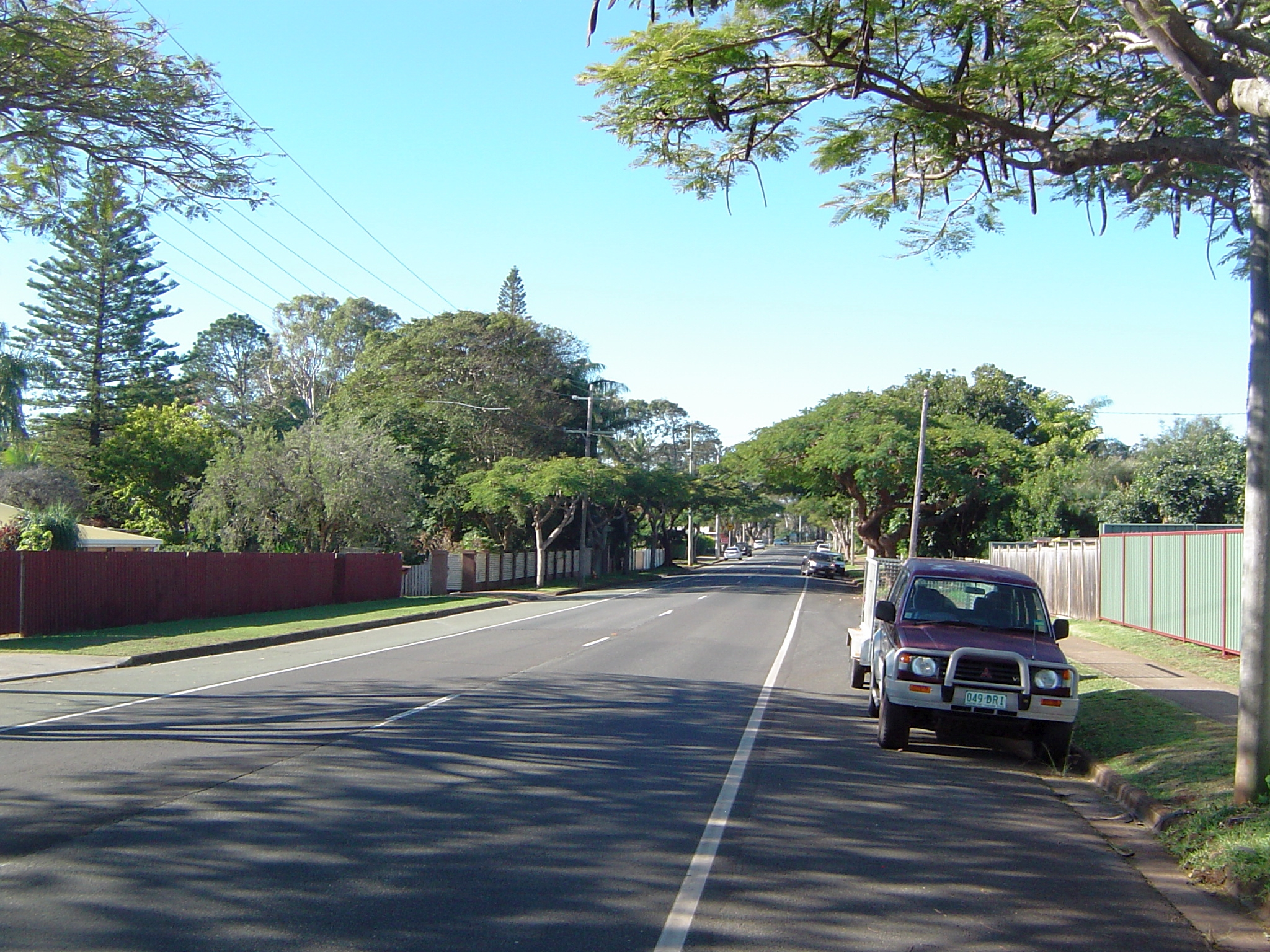
- Colburn Avenue, 2014

- Coordinates: 27.5891°S 153.2888°E
- Population: 15,140 (2021 census)
  - Density: 860.2/km^{2} (2,228/sq mi)
- Postcode(s): 4165
- Area: 17.6 km^{2} (6.8 sq mi)
- Time zone: AEST (UTC+10:00)
- Location: 10.7 km (7 mi) SSE of Cleveland; 36.7 km (23 mi) SE of Brisbane CBD; 67.4 km (42 mi) NNW of Gold Coast
- LGA(s): Redland City
- State electorate(s): Redlands
- Federal division(s): Bowman
Suburbs around Victoria Point:
Thornlands	Moreton Bay	Coochiemudlo Island
Mount Cotton	Victoria Point	Moreton Bay
Mount Cotton	Redland Bay	Redland Bay

Victoria Point is a coastal locality in Redland City, Queensland, Australia. In the 2021 census, Victoria Point had a population of 15,140 people.

== Geography ==
Victoria Point covers a total area of 17.6 km² and is located approximately 33 kilometres (21 mi) south-east of Brisbane, the capital city of Queensland. Victoria Point is primarily a residential area, but it also contains other public complexes like a cinema, a large shopping centre, a library and a ferry service to Coochiemudlo Island. The Cleveland-Redland Bay Road traverses Victoria Point from north to south, passing in between the Victoria Point Shopping Centre and the HomeCo Town Centre, past Victoria Point State High School (the local High School) and then into the neighboring suburb Redland Bay.

== History ==
Redland Bay Provisional School opened on 13 November 1877 and in 1880 was renamed Victoria Point Provisional School. When a separate Redland Bay Provisional School opened on 14 December 1881, the two school operated on a half-time basis, sharing a teacher between them until Victoria Point Provisional School became a full time school again with its own teacher on 15 May 1882. In 1916 a new school building was built on a new site and it opened as Victoria Point State School.

St Anne's Anglican Church was dedicated circa 1963. It closed circa 1988.

Redlands Lutheran Primary School (also known as Faith Primary School) opened on 24 January 1982 on land in Link Road, donated by Wally Hauser. It was established by three Lutheran congregations from Cleveland, Redland Bay and Mount Cotton. There were 64 students in Years 1 to 4 and 3 teachers in the school's first year, expanding to offering Years 1 to 7 by the school's third year of operation. The primary school had expected to become a feeder school to the Redeemer Lutheran College, but when that was not possible, it was decided to expand the school to also offer secondary education. Land on Beveridge Road in Thornlands was purchased and the secondary campus of the renamed Faith Lutheran College, Redlands opened on 28 January 2003. The first group of Year 12s graduated in November 2007.

In 1993, St Rita's Catholic Primary School opened in the tradition of the Augustinian Fathers offering preschool to Year 6 and attracted 92 students. at the time

Victoria Point State High School opened on 28 January 1997.

The Victoria Point public library opened in 2006.

In 2007, there was a growing elderly population with six retirement villages currently in the suburb.

== Demographics ==
In the 2016 census, Victoria Point recorded a population of 15,020 people, 52.9% female and 47.1% male.In the 2016 census, Victoria Point had a population of 15,020 people. The median age of the Victoria Point population was 45 years, 7 years above the national median of 38. 74% of people living in Victoria Point were born in Australia. The other top responses for country of birth were England 7.3%, New Zealand 5.1%, South Africa 1.3%, Scotland 0.8%, Netherlands 0.5%. 91% of people spoke only English at home; the next most common languages were 0.3% German, 0.3% Afrikaans, 0.2% Spanish, 0.2% Italian, 0.2% Punjabi.

In the 2021 census, Victoria Point had a population of 15,140 people.

== Heritage listings ==
There is one heritage listing in Victoria Point, “Monkani” at 11 Point O’Halloran Road.

== Amenities ==
The area also hosts the Eprapah, the Charles S. Snow Scout Environment Training Centre, an area of bushland for the environmental education for members of the Scout and Guide movements. Eprapah Creek separates Victoria Point to the north from the next suburb of Thornlands.

The headland has two boat ramps for boat entry to Moreton Bay and a Volunteer Marine Rescue unit. Beach areas include Thompson's Beach, a small child safe beach which has a very shallow slope allowing a long tide. Shopping facilities have expanded rapidly in the last few years, with now four supermarkets, cinema complex and many specialty shops and lakeside restaurants. The Redland City Council operates a public library at Lakeside Shopping Centre, 7-15 Bunker Road. It also operates a mobile library service which visits Boat Street.

There is also a ferry operating from Victoria point to Coochiemudlo island

== Education ==
Victoria Point is home to four schools, two of which are government schools and two of which are private schools.

Victoria Point State School is a government primary (Preparatory to Year 6) school for boys and girls at 274 Colburn Avenue (corner of School Road, 27.5841°S 153.2957°E). In 2017, the school had an enrolment of 520 students with 38 teachers (33 full-time equivalent) and 27 non-teaching staff (15 full-time equivalent). It includes a special education program.

St Rita's Primary School is a Catholic primary (Preparatory to Year 6) school for boys and girls at 39 Benfer Road (27.5917°S 153.2943°E). In 2017, the school had an enrolment of 535 students with 38 teachers (32 full-time equivalent) and 23 non-teaching staff (15 full-time equivalent). The school operates its own church.

Faith Lutheran College is a private primary (Preparatory to Year 6) school for boys and girls at 132 Link Road (27.5848°S 153.2933°E). In 2017, the school had an enrolment of 840 students with 66 teachers (60 full-time equivalent) and 64 non-teaching staff (32 full-time equivalent).

Victoria Point State High School is a government secondary (7–12) school for boys and girls at 93–131 Benfer Road (27.5955°S 153.2878°E). In 2017, the school had an enrolment of 1155 students with 95 teachers (89 full-time equivalent) and 41 non-teaching staff (32 full-time equivalent). It includes a special education program.

== Media ==
Victoria Point is serviced by community radio station BayFM.

== Sporting clubs ==
The Redland Australian Football Club, often referred to as the Redland Victoria Point Sharks (previously Redlands Bombers), competes in the Queensland Australian Football League (QAFL), previously known as North East Australian Football League and provides many sporting opportunities for the area.

The sharks sporting club offers a field to watch game and a pub to eat food
