= Serpentine Creek Road Cemetery =

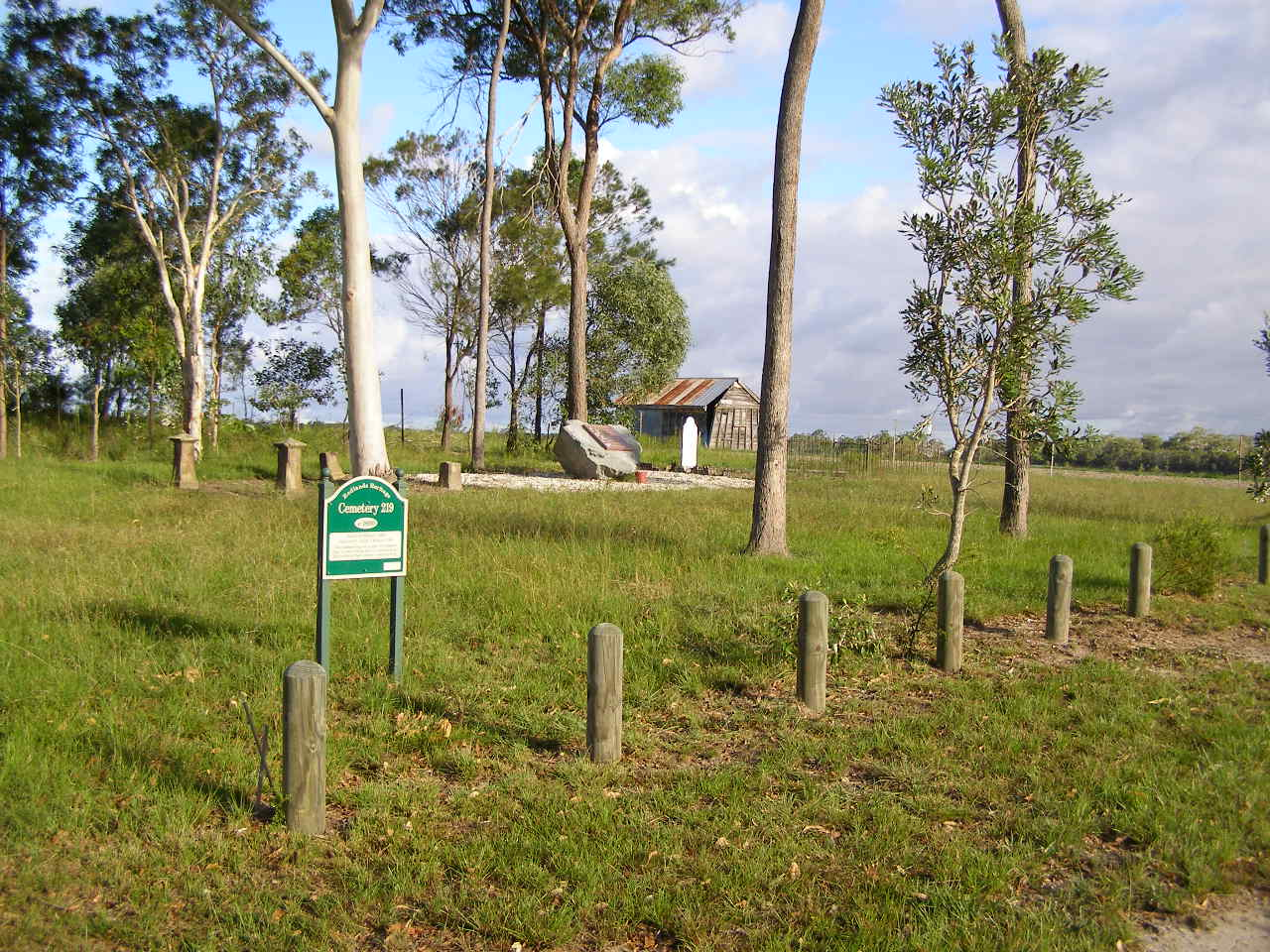
- Serpentine Creek Road cemetery, Redland Bay, 2006

- Location within Queensland Location within Australia
- 27.6693°S 153.3023°E
- Location: 398–408 Serpentine Creek Road, Redland Bay, Queensland, Australia

History
- Design period: 1870s–1890s (late 19th century)
- Built: 1890–1945

Queensland Heritage Register
- Official name: Serpentine Creek Road Cemetery, Redland Bay Cemetery, South Redland Bay Cemetery
- Type: state heritage (built)
- Designated: 6 January 1999
- Reference no.: 601927
- Significant period: 1890s–1945 (fabric and historical use)
- Significant components: fence/wall – perimeter, trees – remnant scrub, grave surrounds/railings, burial/grave, memorial/monument, headstone

Serpentine Creek Road Cemetery is a heritage-listed cemetery at 398–408 Serpentine Creek Road, Redland Bay, Redland City, Queensland, Australia. It was established in 1890 and operated until 1945. It is also known as Redland Bay Cemetery and South Redland Bay Cemetery. It was added to the Queensland Heritage Register on 6 January 1999.

== History ==
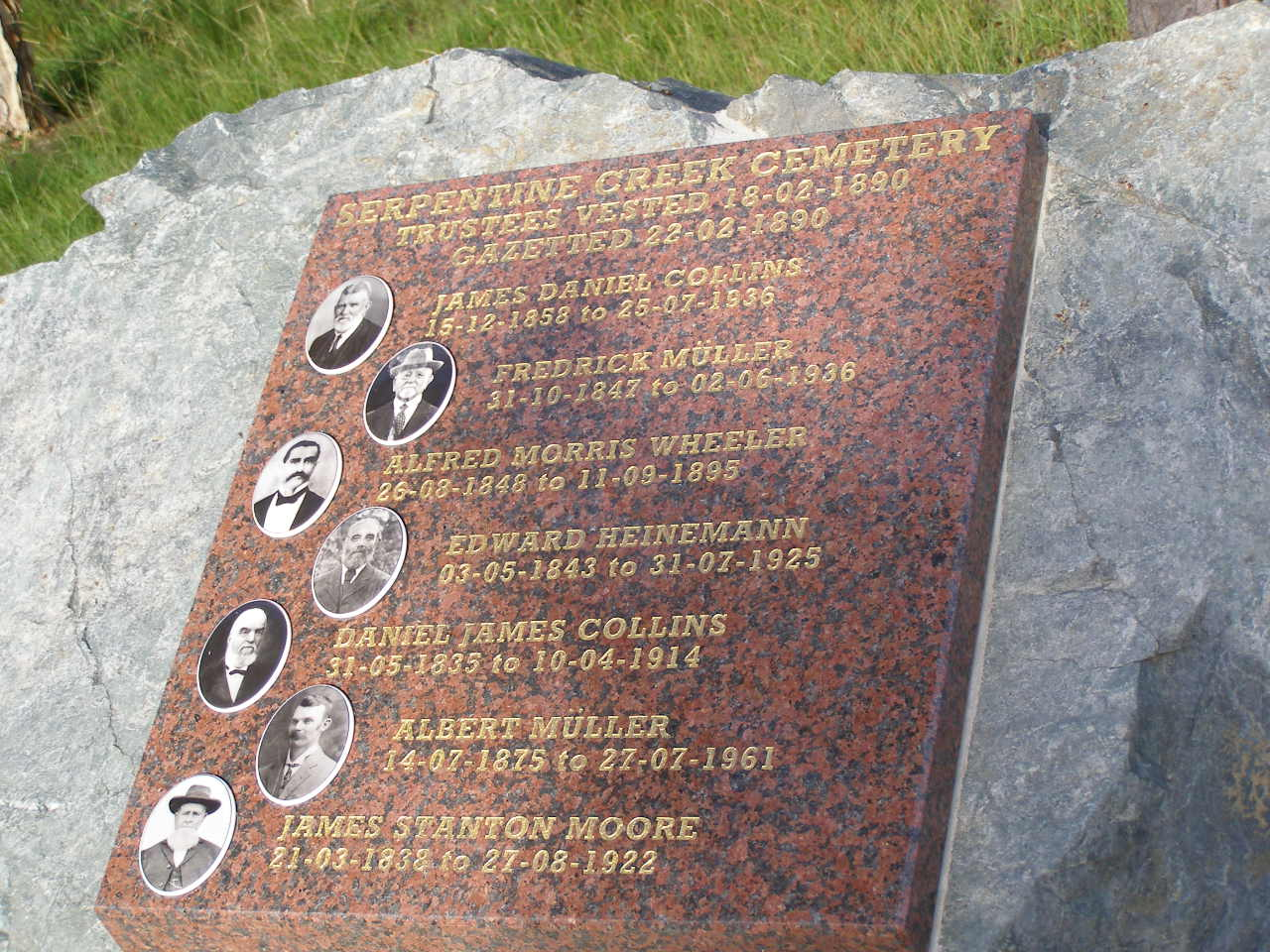
Serpentine Creek Road Cemetery, memorial for the trustees, 2006. The names of the trustees are: James Daniel Collins, Frederick Muller, Alfred Morris Wheeler, Edward Heinemann, Daniel James Collins, Albert Muller, James Stanton Moore.

Serpentine Creek Road Cemetery was established in 1890 as the Redland Bay Cemetery, serving the farming community of Redland Bay and nearby Mount Cotton and Gramzow (now Carbrook). It closed c. 1945, but remains a Cemetery Reserve under the trusteeship of Redland City Council.

Land in the Redland Bay district, which extends from south of Cleveland to the lower Logan River district, and from the bay about 3 miles (4.8 km) west to Mount Cotton, was taken up for closer settlement under the Cotton Regulations of 1860 and the Coffee and Sugar Regulations of 1864. There was also heavy logging of the valuable cedar and beech stands at this period. By the mid-1870s Redland Bay was well known as a sugar district, dominated by the Redland Bay Sugar Plantation. This had been established by the Newton family in the 1860s and by 1870 was the principal sugar cultivator and employer in the district. However, much of the land at Redland Bay had been taken up by speculators in the 1860s – by 1871 there were only a dozen or so Redland Bay farms (exclusive of the Redland Bay Plantation) and 1 farm at Mount Cotton, supporting a total population of 40. More extensive farming at Redland Bay did not develop until the 1880s, when boom prices encouraged the sale of land to farmers.

By the early 1880s, sugar cultivation at Redland Bay and Mount Cotton had mostly succumbed to competition from north Queensland, although the Heinemann family at Mount Cotton continued to grow sugar on a substantial scale until the turn of the century. By the late 1880s, Redland Bay had emerged as a prosperous fruit-growing district – principally bananas, oranges and pineapples, with passionfruit a successful 20th century crop. Redland Bay State School was opened at the beginning of 1886, and Redland Bay farmers were the first in the district to erect a School of Arts (a substantial timber building opened in August 1889). In 1889 their farmhouses were described as "large roomy wooden houses of pleasing designs. . . and. . . in front of almost every house is a well stocked and neat flower garden".

In the early 1870s the densely scrubbed Mount Cotton district had been taken up by mainly German immigrants, who in 1875 erected St Paul's Lutheran Church at the intersection of what became known as the German Church Road and the Mount Cotton Road. They established a burial ground adjacent to the Church (now known as Carbrook Lutheran Cemetery), and the majority of the graves in this cemetery are those of the German pioneers of the Gramzow and Mount Cotton areas and those of their descendants. However, this cemetery did not serve the needs of the wider farming community. It was some miles over badly formed roads from Redland Bay, and it was a Lutheran cemetery.

In September 1889 the Tingalpa Divisional Board, on behalf of the residents of Redland Bay, Gramzow and district, made application to the Lands Department of the Queensland Government for the reservation of portion 84a, parish of Redland (about 20 acres), as a Cemetery Reserve. 5 acres of this was gazetted as a cemetery (R.219) in February 1890, and five Redland Bay farmers (Frederick Muller, James Collins, Edward Heinemann, James Moore and Daniel James Collins) were appointed trustees in May 1890. Muller and DJ Collins were also members of the Tingalpa Divisional Board, and Edward Heinemann was the brother of the chair of the 1889 Tingalpa Divisional Board, Hans Heindrich Heinemann of Mount Cotton, and later served on the Tingalpa Shire Council. Several of the cemetery trustees were also on the committees of the Redland Bay School of Arts and the Redland Bay State School.

The chosen site lay on the road from Redland Bay to Gramzow on the Logan (now Serpentine Creek Road), about half-way between the two districts, in southern Redland Bay. It does not appear to have been farmed prior to reservation, and was heavily timbered with gum, casuarina (she-oak), bloodwood and grass tree, with mahogany and turpentine interspersed. It is not known how much of the 5 acres was cleared for cemetery purposes.

The 1890 cemetery reserve was known as the Redland Bay Cemetery, and remained the only public cemetery in the district for about 18 years. By the early 1900s, however, it was considered too inconveniently distant and "desolate" for many in the Redland Bay community. In September 1907, Councillor PP Outridge of Tingalpa Shire Council offered to donate a block of 22 acres at Gordon Street, close to the township of Redland Bay, conditional upon 5 acres being used for cemetery purposes, and the remainder for public recreation. The offer was accepted by the Council, despite the refusal of the trustees of the existing Redland Bay Cemetery on Serpentine Creek Road, to relinquish their trusteeship.

Title to the Gordon Street land passed to the Council in late 1907 and a 5-acre cemetery was established on the site, with the first burial taking place early in February 1908. To avoid confusion with the Redland Bay Cemetery at Serpentine Creek Road, the new cemetery was known as the North Redland Cemetery from March 1909. Only four interments were removed from Redland Bay Cemetery and re-interred at North Redland Cemetery – 1 in 1908, 1 in 1923, and 2 in 1929 – and the two Redland Bay cemeteries continued to operate in tandem for some decades. By August 1925 the 1890 cemetery was known as the South Redland Bay Cemetery, when Edward Heinemann of Redland Bay, one of the original trustees of the Redland Bay Cemetery, was interred there. The cemetery was closed c. 1945, and by the late 1970s part of the reserve was being used for grazing purposes.

In 1908 James Moore had resigned as a Trustee of the Redland Bay Cemetery, and had been replaced by another local farmer, Albert Muller. Despite the passing of the original trustees, no further change of trustees was officially recorded until, following public petition that the place be conserved, control of the cemetery reserve passed to the Redland Shire Council in 1977. Grazing on the reserve ceased at this point.

In 1995, the old cemetery on Serpentine Creek Road was identified in the Redland Heritage Study as a place of local and regional significance. Recently the local community, with assistance from Redland Shire Council, has undertaken work on clearing the grounds, identifying grave sites, recording information from the surviving headstones, and establishing a botanical inventory. Following a 1997 fire, which destroyed much of the casuarina forest on the site, substantial re-growth of other indigenous species has occurred.

== Description ==
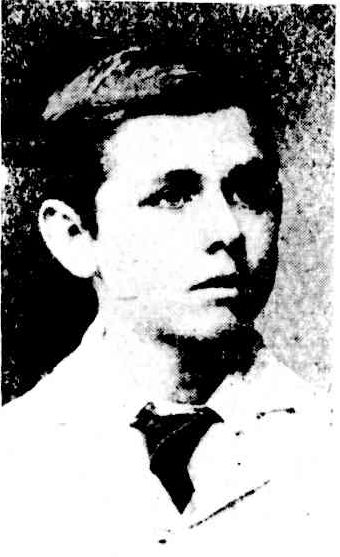
Willie Fielding, aged 14

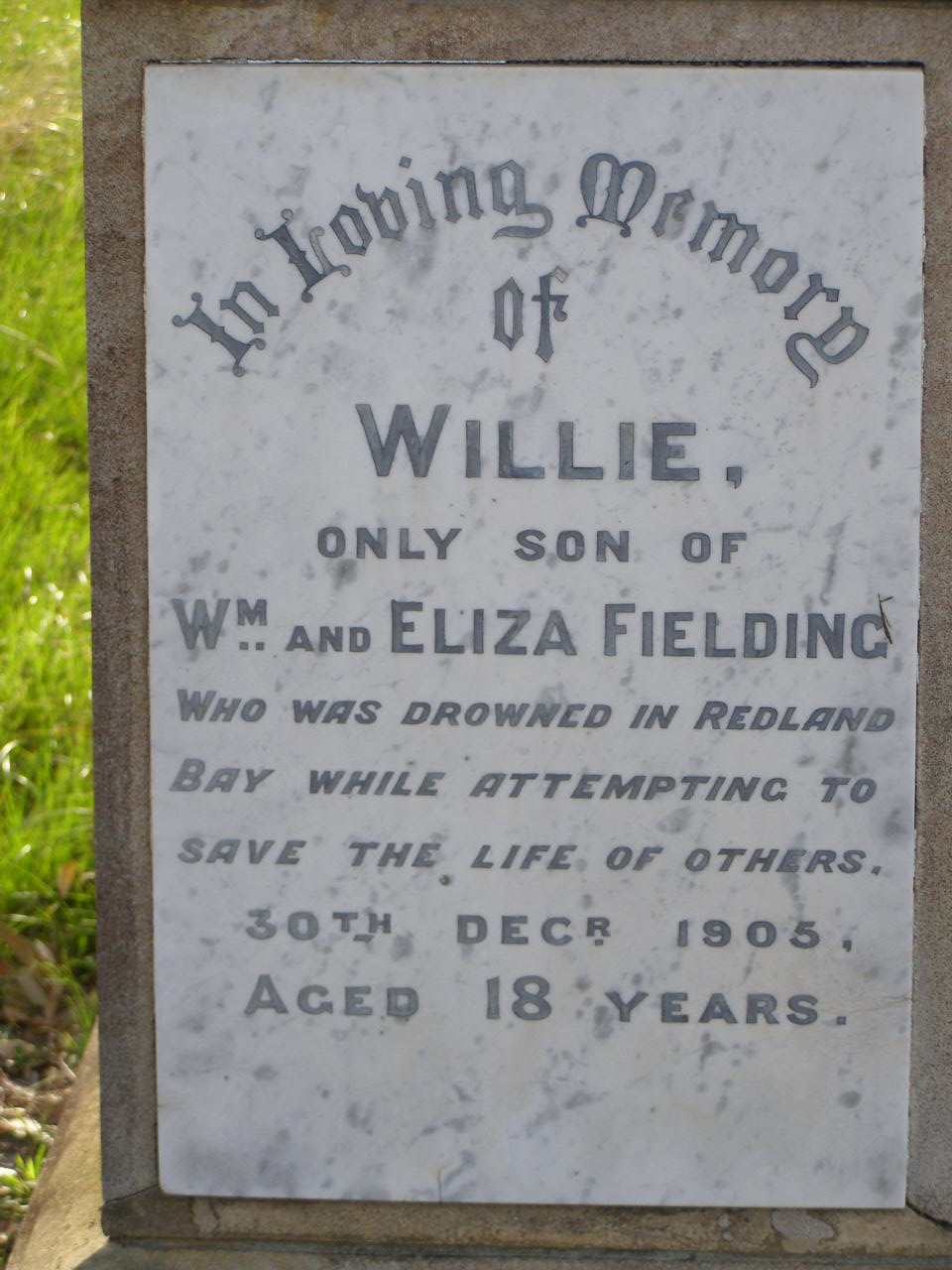
Willie Fielding's headstone, 2006

The Serpentine Creek Road Cemetery is a 2.023 hectare (5 acre) cemetery reserve located on the eastern side of Serpentine Creek Road, just south of the intersection with Scenic Road, in southern Redland Bay. The reserve, rectangular in shape, runs east-west along a gravelly ridge, with farms on three sides and a frontage to Serpentine Creek Road. Being the only remnant forest on this side of Serpentine Creek Road, and sited on a rise, the place is prominently profiled on the horizon.

Several graves have been identified at the southwest corner of the site, near the road frontage. This area has been cleared of saplings and undergrowth, leaving naturally re-vegetated eucalypts and grasses. The remainder of the block is open woodland of principally casuarina, wattle and grass tree. There has been a high level of disturbance of the reserve through frequent fires and later grazing, which may account for the high proportion of more resilient casuarina and wattle at the expense of other indigenous species such as eucalypts and bloodwood. While there are no old-growth trees on the reserve, the original mix of species survives, and there is a particularly high diversity of indigenous flora, including one species of wildflower found only within the reserve. The vegetation mix is similar to that in the nearby Serpentine Creek Conservation Park, and, with so much of Redland Bay's indigenous vegetation lost to farming and encroaching residential development, remains important to the genetic exchange among plant species.

There is a wire and timber post fence along the northern end of the street frontage, but no perimeter fence around the graves. The burnt remnants of a post and top-rail fence, aligned east-west through the centre of the reserve, survive. These fences appear to be associated more with later grazing of the reserve than with the early cemetery.

There are just over a dozen identifiable graves, with names including Dittman, Doig, Fielding, Heinemann, Sinclair and Walker – all from early Redland Bay farming families. All the graves face east, aligned in several rows running north-south. It is not clear whether they have been arranged by religious division. Some headstones survive, bearing dates ranging from 1896 to 1909, and include the work of monumental masons W Bateson & Sons of South Brisbane, Andrew Lang Petrie of Toowong and J Simmonds of Brisbane. Nearly all the headstones and grave surrounds [including two cast-iron surrounds] have been damaged. The most prominent memorial in the cemetery is that executed by AL Petrie – a sandstone obelisk, comprising plinth, shaft and column, with a marble plaque on the eastern face bearing the inscription: "In loving memory of Willie, only son of Wm and Eliza Fielding who was drowned in Redland Bay while attempting to save the life of others 30th Dec 1905 aged 18 years". Willie Fielding died in a boating accident involving a number of teenagers. He attempted to save the lives of others but tragically drowned himself. His body was not found for a number of days as he was eaten by a shark. His remains were buried on 8 January 1906 in a very largely attended funeral.

== Heritage listing ==
Serpentine Creek Road Cemetery was listed on the Queensland Heritage Register on 6 January 1999 having satisfied the following criteria.

The place is important in demonstrating the evolution or pattern of Queensland's history.

Serpentine Creek Road Cemetery, established 1890, evidences the closer settlement of the Redland Bay district in the late 19th century, when it was established as a prosperous fruit-growing district. The small cemetery, set on the top of a ridge amid farm lands, is evocatively illustrative of the efforts of early, isolated farming communities to improve local facilities.

The place demonstrates rare, uncommon or endangered aspects of Queensland's cultural heritage.

The place is significant also for its remnant and now uncommon indigenous vegetation mix, in a district which has been heavily farmed since the late 19th century.

The place is important because of its aesthetic significance.

The place has aesthetic value in its prominent skyline profile and in the rusticity of the few surviving grave sites, which contain several headstones and memorials, and grave surrounds in concrete and iron.

The place has a strong or special association with a particular community or cultural group for social, cultural or spiritual reasons.

The place has strong significance for many families in the Redland Bay district, because of its association with their family history and with the establishment of their community.
