= Venman =

Venman may refer to:

- Jack Venman (1911–1994), Australian landowner
- Venman Bushland National Park, national park in Australia
