= Lamb Island, Queensland =

Lamb Island
- Town
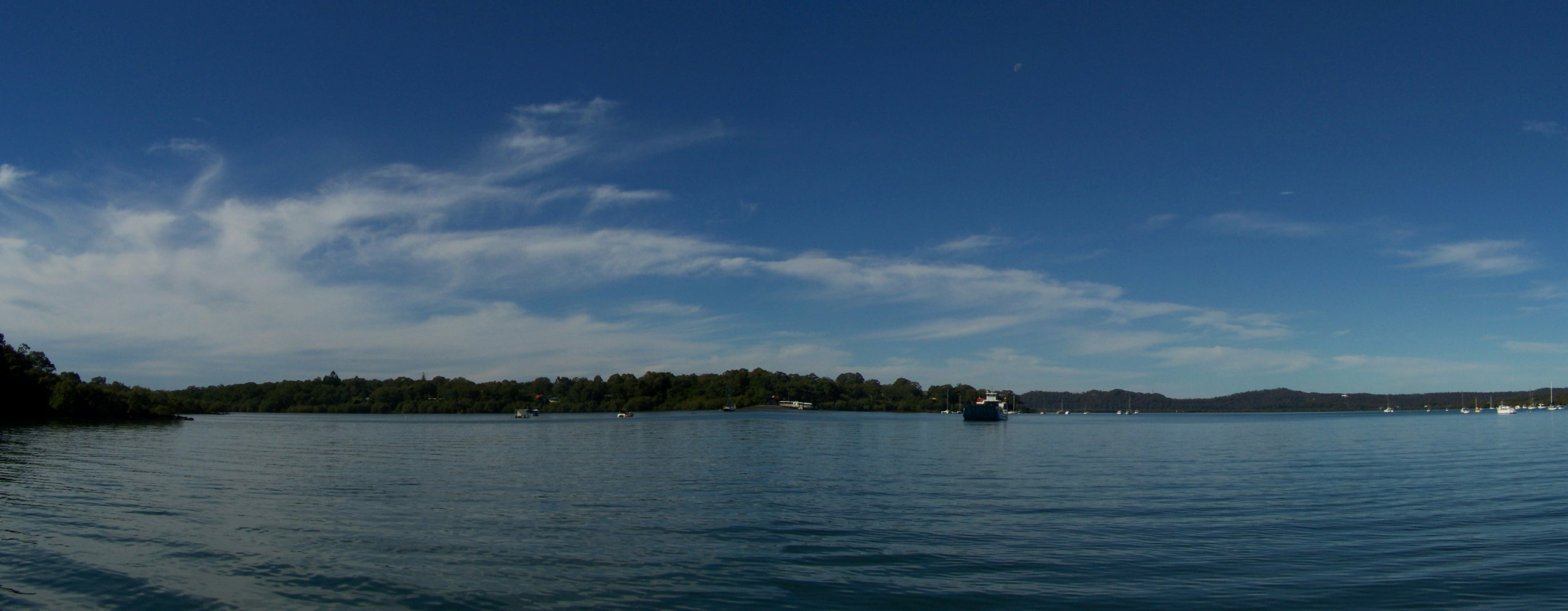
- Lamb Island

- Interactive map of Lamb Island
- Coordinates: 27.6261°S 153.3796°E
- Country: Australia
- State: Queensland
- City: Moreton Bay
- LGA: Redland City

Government
  - State electorate: Redlands
  - Federal division: Bowman

Area
  - Total: 3.2 km^{2} (1.2 sq mi)

Population
  - Total: 504 (2021 census)
  - Density: 157.5/km^{2} (408/sq mi)
- Time zone: UTC+10:00 (AEST)
- Postcode: 4184
Localities around Lamb Island
Thornlands	Cleveland	Moreton Island
Mount Cotton	Lamb Island	Stradbroke Island
Redland Bay	Victoria Point	Macleay Island

Lamb Island is an island, a town and a locality in Redland City, Queensland, Australia. In the 2021 census, the locality of Lamb Island had a population of 504 people.

== Geography ==
The island is in the southern part of Moreton Bay between the Queensland mainland and North Stradbroke Island. It is within the Moreton Bay Marine Park. The elevation ranges from 0 to 26 metres (0 to 85 ft) above sea level. The land use on the island is predominantly residential.

Offshore from the south-east side of Lamb Island is a Protection and Conservation park zone which is home to protected species of marine life including dugong, dolphins and leatherback turtles.

== History ==
Lamb Island has a rich history of food production dating back to the early 1900s. The island consisted of numerous small farms which supplied produce to the mainland Brisbane market. Due to the unique micro climate created by the islands geographic location, its extremely fertile volcanic soil and the pure sand aquifers that run beneath it, the farmers were able to supply superior produce to the mainland market earlier than their mainland competitors. There were several boats (including the well known historic vessels "Roo" and "Amazon") which travelled from the upper reaches of the Brisbane river out to the island to transport the produce. The Roo would also transport supplies from Brisbane for the island's residents and weekend trippers who would visit the island. One of the well known attractions was Peggy Saunders' garden parties. Peggy Saunders was the wife of one of the original farmers and was well known for her beautiful garden which was located on the Western waterfront of the island.

In the late 1970s, Lamb Island, like much of South East Queensland, was developed into small residential allotments. The majority of the original farm land was subdivided with only a handful of small farming lots remaining. The island has remained largely undeveloped with the majority of the small residential lots being left as vacant land. Residential development has been limited largely due to transport costs of materials for building. The small lot sub division is, to some degree, being undone, as a result of the Redland City Council's 2020 initiative to promote land buy buy back by residents who own neighboring lots to those held by the Council. Additionally, due to the low price of land preceding 2020, it was not uncommon for resident land owners to buy multiple adjoining lots to increase lot sizes.

In recent years, with the popularity and resurgence of organic food, the island is gaining a reputation for its unique micro climate and organically grown produce. In addition to commercial organic growing ventures on the island, there are a number of small community garden groups engaged in organic food and ornamental plant production together with a local artisan industry with an emphasis on Permaculture values.

The Island has a very active incorporated residents' association (LIRA - Lamb Island Resident's Association) which is regularly engaged in community improvement projects which have included native tree planting, heritage site restoration/maintenance and general facility upgrades.

== Demographics ==
In the 2011 census, Lamb Island had a population of 427 people, 50.4% female and 49.6% male. The median age of the Lamb Island population was 51 years, 14 years above the national median of 37. 69.4% of people living in Lamb Island were born in Australia. The other top responses for country of birth were England 6.8%, New Zealand 6.5%, Philippines 2.3%, Netherlands 1.6%, Germany 1.2%. 90.4% of people spoke only English at home; the next most common languages were 2.8% Tagalog, 0.9% German, 0.9% French, 0.9% Samoan, 0.9% Spanish.

In the 2016 census, the locality of Lamb Island had a population of 432 people, 49% female and 51% male. The median age of the Lamb Island population was 59 years. The number of private dwellings on the island was 330.

In the 2021 census, the locality of Lamb Island had a population of 504 people.

== Heritage listings ==
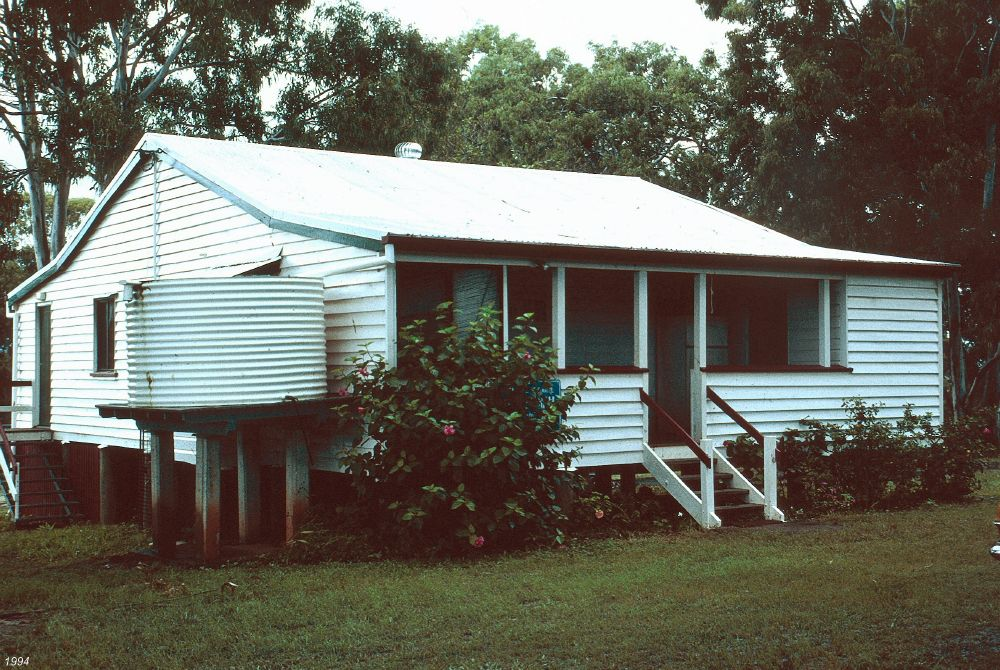
Lamb Island Pioneer Hall, 1994

Lamb Island has a number of heritage-listed sites, including:

- Lavender Street: Dam and melaleuca forest
- 109-123 Lucas Drive: Lamb Island Pioneer Hall
- Road Reserve at end of Lucas Drive: Jetty Shed which has been restored by the local island community group and was used for loading local produce onto the merchant boats
- At the end of Lucas Drive: Thomas Lucas’ Grave
- Tina Avenue: Mango trees which were planted over 100 years ago by the acclimatisation society
- Home located on Tina Avenue which was one of the original farm houses, then served as the local post office and telephone exchange

== Education ==
There are no schools on Lamb Island. The nearest government primary school is Macleay Island State School on neighbouring Macleay Island to the north-west. The nearest government secondary school is Victoria Point State High School in Victoria Point on the mainland to the north-west.

== Transportation ==
Transportation to Lamb Island is by high speed passenger ferry and vehicular barge service. The high speed passenger ferries run approximately every half hour from approximately 4 am – midnight, 7 days per week (subject to changing timetables) and numerous residents commute daily to the mainland. The Lamb Island terminal is located on the Southern end of Lucas Drive which is the central main road (27.63083°S 153.37245°E). The high speed passenger ferry takes approximately 15 minutes from the Redland Bay marina on the mainland.

== Services ==
Residents also have access to an online car share service located on the mainland. Share cars are available at the mainland ferry terminal, using a mobile phone app.

== Arts & Culture ==
Lamb Island was the title and subject of a 2010 short film by film maker Tim Marshall.

Peter Ludlow's book entitled "Moreton Bay People" features historical figures and features of Lamb Island.

The island forms part of the Redland City Council's heritage trail which identifies significant local heritage sites.

Numerous art installations are located around the island including artist Antone Bruinsma's "Island Girl" which is located close to the ferry terminal.

The "Girt by Sea" visual arts competition is held annually with a prize pool of approximately $90,000. The competition is supported by the Redland City Council which has acquired several of the entries in the Girt by Sea competition and located them on Lamb Island.
