= Lamb Island Pioneer Hall =

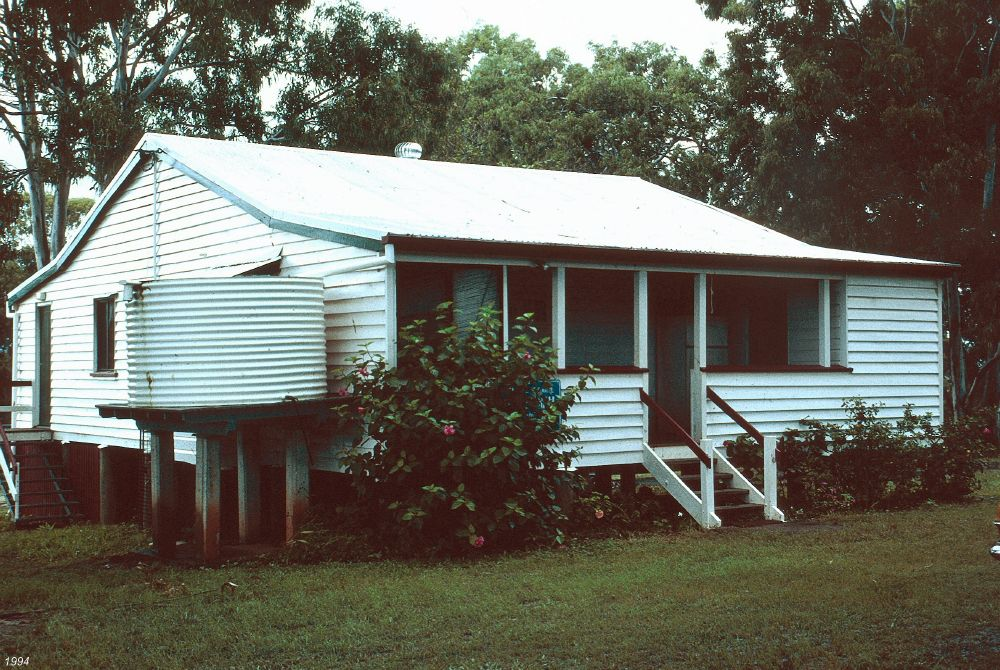
- Lamb Island Pioneer Hall, 1994

- Location within Queensland Location within Australia
- 27.6246°S 153.3837°E
- Location: Lucas Drive, Lamb Island, City of Redland, Queensland, Australia

History
- Design period: 1919 - 1930s (interwar period)
- Built: c. 1924 - 1930s

Queensland Heritage Register
- Official name: Lamb Island Pioneer Hall
- Type: state heritage (built)
- Designated: 3 April 1995
- Reference no.: 601493
- Significant period: c. 1924, 1930s (fabric); 1920s-1956 (historical); 1978-ongoing (social)
- Significant components: tank stand

Lamb Island Pioneer Hall is a heritage-listed former house and now community hall at Lucas Drive, Lamb Island, City of Redland, Queensland, Australia. It was built from c. 1924 to 1930s. It was added to the Queensland Heritage Register on 3 April 1995.

== History ==
Pioneer Hall was erected reputedly in 1924, as a farmhouse for Cecil Hine of Lamb Island.

Ngudurru, or Lamb Island as it was later known, was one of a group of islands in Moreton Bay which included Macleay, Russell and Karragarra Islands, located southeast of Cleveland and east of Redland Bay. The four islands appear to have been surveyed during the late 1860s and early 1870s, and portions of land on the islands were auctioned from this time.

The whole of Ngudurru was acquired by John Harris in 1871. John and his brother George had a shipping and importing business in Brisbane from the late 1850s to the 1870s. J & G Harris also acquired land on the southern end of Macleay Island which they subsequently advertised for sale in 1871 as a Valuable Freehold Sugar Estate. The Harris brothers' firm was declared insolvent in 1878, and John's land on Lamb Island was transferred to Arthur Biddle, then to Joseph Darragh, and John Cameron, the Brisbane auctioneer. Cameron sold the land in 1886, and the subdivision of the island commenced the following year. The land changed hands a number of times before it was acquired by Hine in 1919.

Locally, it is understood that Hine arrived at Lamb Island in the mid-1910s, and married Amelia Cox in 1923. By the mid-1920s, Hine's farm was one of approximately five farms on the island. Lamb and the neighbouring islands are recorded as producing fruit crops such as pineapples and bananas by the twentieth century. Oyster gathering was also carried out on the islands.

Hine extended his farmhouse reputedly in the mid-1930s, and sold the property in 1956. The property came under the control of the Redland Shire Council in 1974. In 1976, a meeting was held in the "old farmhouse" to re-form the Lamb Island Progress Association. The farmhouse, by then in a deteriorated condition, was repaired by the community in 1977 and became known as Pioneer Hall. The official opening of Pioneer Hall was held in May 1978.

The Hall is used on election days, for political meetings and occasionally as a venue for community functions and groups. The many council restrictions relating to the use of facilities, the high cost of renting the hall and the requirement for users to pay public liability insurance means it is not used to its full potential. The restrictions and expenses have had the effect of driving away small community groups who have used the hall as a meeting place in the past. Pioneer Hall houses a small library and book exchange but fails to meet the community's needs as a meeting place despite its central location, charm and history. Pioneer Hall is understood to be one of few extant early twentieth century farmhouse buildings on the island.

== Description ==
The Lamb Island Pioneer Hall is a modest timber cottage located at the end of Lucas Drive on the easterly side of Lamb Island. It is sited on the edge of a hill that slopes down towards Moreton Bay, overlooking treed recreation grounds. The building has a gabled corrugated iron roof over a simple rectangular structure resting on timber stumps, and has verandahs with skillion roofs to the west and east (the latter is now enclosed). The building is entered via central stairs to the western verandah, and the eastern verandah commands views of the Bay.

The building is clad for the most part in weatherboard, excepting a chamferboard section to the western (front) verandah. It has a corrugated iron watertank and former stove recess to the north-west corner, and timber stairs at each end of the eastern verandah.

Internally, the Lamb Island Pioneer Hall comprises four rooms: a kitchen and library to the eastern side and a larger meeting/recreation room (formerly two rooms) adjoining an enclosed verandah to the western side. The walls and ceilings are lined with vertically jointed timber boards, and some rooms have exposed internal framing.

The hall contains pictures and artefacts that relate to its history, including: a painted timber sign that reads FARM HOME of Mr & Mrs C.A. HINE BUILT in 1924, photographs of the building and its users, and paintings of the building by local residents.

== Heritage listing ==
Lamb Island Pioneer Hall was listed on the Queensland Heritage Register on 3 April 1995 having satisfied the following criteria.

The place is important in demonstrating the evolution or pattern of Queensland's history.

As one of the few surviving farmhouses on Lamb Island, Pioneer Hall also maintains an association with the development of farming on the island (originally Ngudooroo) from the 1870s.

The place has a strong or special association with a particular community or cultural group for social, cultural or spiritual reasons.

Lamb Island Pioneer Hall, erected c. 1924 as a farmhouse, represents a focal point for communal activities on the Island, and maintains a special association with the Lamb Island community.
