= Mount Cotton Road =

Road in Queensland, Australia

Coordinates: 27°35′1.5″S 153°13′22.3″E

Mount Cotton Road Queensland
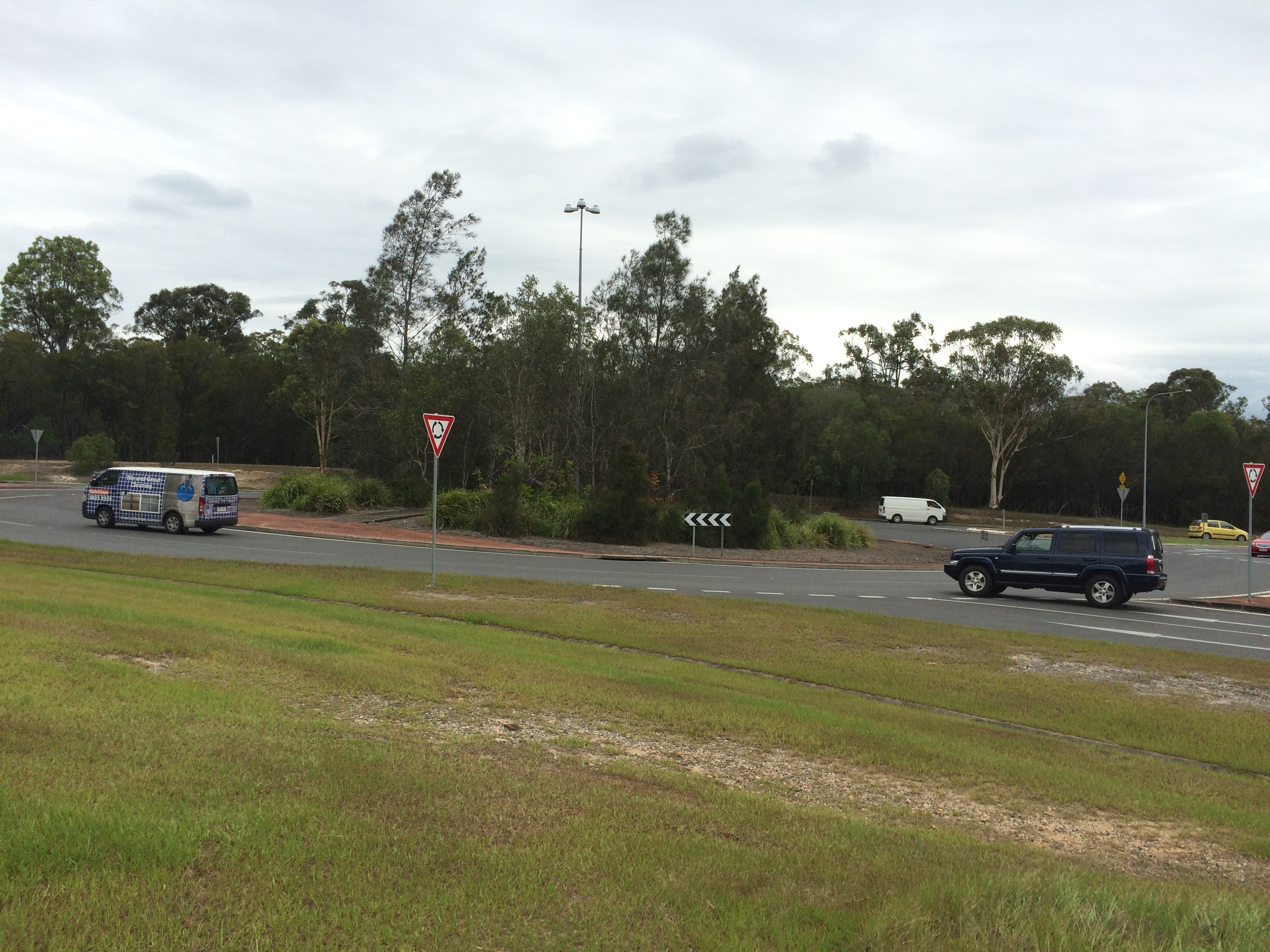
- Roundabout at which Mount Cotton Road divides into 3 branches, east of Tingalpa Creek, dividing Capalaba and Sheldon

General information
- Type: Road
- Length: 26.5 km (16 mi)
- Route number(s): State Route 21 (Burbank–Capalaba/Sheldon); State Route 45 (Capalaba–Carbrook/Cornubia)
- Mount Cotton Road is a split road

Major junctions
- West end: Mount Gravatt–Capalaba Road (State Route 21), Burbank, near Mackenzie
- East end: Duncan Road (State Route 21), Capalaba/Sheldon
- North end: Redland Bay Road (State Route 44), Capalaba, near Old Cleveland Rd
- South end: Beenleigh–Redland Bay Road (State Route 47), Carbrook/Cornubia

Location(s)
- LGA(s): City of Brisbane; Redland City; City of Logan
- Major suburbs: Burbank, Capalaba, Sheldon, Mount Cotton, Carbrook, Cornubia

Mount Cotton Road, or Mt Cotton Rd, is a major split road in the Brisbane area of South East Queensland, Australia. It runs in both an east-west direction between Burbank (Brisbane) and Sheldon (Redlands), and a north-south direction between Capalaba (Redlands) and Carbrook (Logan). In total, the road is approximately 26.5 kilometres (16.5 mi) long, and is split at a three-way roundabout.

The road is notable for connecting three adjacent local government areas of Queensland: the City of Brisbane, Redland City, and the City of Logan. As there are no highways in this region east of the Gateway and Pacific Motorways, Mount Cotton Road often provides the fastest link between the three cities (more so regarding the south-east of Brisbane and north-east of Logan).

== History ==
The branching segments of Mount Cotton Road were originally known by multiple different names. The Burbank segment, west of the aforementioned roundabout, was once known as Broadwater Road, while the resulting northern branch was known as Capalaba School Road.

Initially, Mount Cotton Road would have referred to the path travelled by the earliest colonial settlers of Mount Cotton in the mid-1800s. As the surrounding region grew and became better-connected, the name spread to some adjoining roads, causing the multi-branched structure of Mount Cotton Rd today.

Much of the road was once surrounded by farmland. This was gradually replaced with residential properties, prompting the roadside construction of: the Carbrook Lutheran Cemetery and Church in the 1870s; Capalaba State School in 1880; telephone lines, a community hall, and an avicultural farm in 1935–36; a store and post office in 1948; a Salvation Army hall in 1960; and Capalaba Park Shopping Centre in 1981.

With the construction of the Leslie Harrison Dam in the 1960s, the portions of the road near Tingalpa Creek were upgraded.

Sections of Mt Cotton Rd have since been identified as dangerous driving areas, due to high incidences of crashes with other cars and wallabies, leading to investigations in recent years.

Mt Cotton Road has been identified as a terminus point for the Coomera Connector, a highway project designed to parallel the M1.

== Landmarks ==
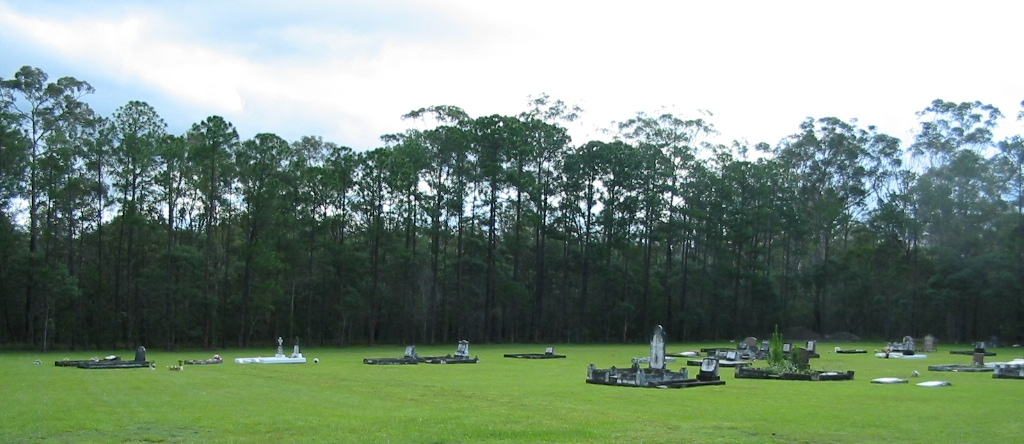
Carbrook Lutheran Cemetery, located near the southern end of Mount Cotton Road.

Significant remaining structures and natural landmarks located along Mount Cotton Road include:

- Hindu Mandir Association of Queensland, Burbank
- Tingalpa Creek, Burbank/Capalaba/Sheldon
- Redlands PCYC, Capalaba
- Capalaba State College, Capalaba
- Capalaba Park Shopping Centre, Capalaba
- Sirromet Winery, Mount Cotton
- Mount Cotton State School, Mount Cotton
- Mount Cotton Quarry, Mount Cotton
- The RACQ Mobility Centre (driver training), Cornubia
- Great Southern Memorial Park Cemetery and Crematorium, Carbrook
- Carbrook Lutheran Cemetery, Carbrook

== Major intersections ==
The east–west section has no major intersections.
The north–south section is shown below.

LGA	Location	km	mi	Destinations	Notes
Redland City	Capalaba	0	0.0	Redland Bay Road (State Route 44) – north–west – Capalaba / south–east – Alexandra Hills	Northern end of Mount Cotton Road (State Route 45)
Redland City	Capalaba	0.45	0.28	Moreton Bay Road (State Route 22) – west – Chandler / east – Alexandra Hills	
Redland City	Capalaba–Sheldon boundary	4.5	2.8	Broadwater Road (State Route 21) – west – Burbank	Northern concurrency terminus with State Route 21
Redland City	Capalaba–Sheldon boundary	6.8	4.2	Duncan Road (State Route 21) – east – Thornlands / Lyndon Road – north – Alexandra Hills	Southern concurrency terminus with State Route 21
Redland City	Mount Cotton	12.6	7.8	Double Jump Road – north–east – Victoria Point	
Redland City	Mount Cotton	15.5	9.6	Valley Way – east — Redland Bay	
Logan City	Cornubia–Carbrook boundary	20.1	12.5	Beenleigh Redland Bay Road (State Route 47) – west – Cornubia / east – Carbrook	Southern end of Mount Cotton Road
1.000 mi = 1.609 km; 1.000 km = 0.621 mi: Concurrency terminus

== See also ==
- Old Cleveland Road
- Logan Road
- Road transport in Brisbane
