= Jack Venman =

Australian man

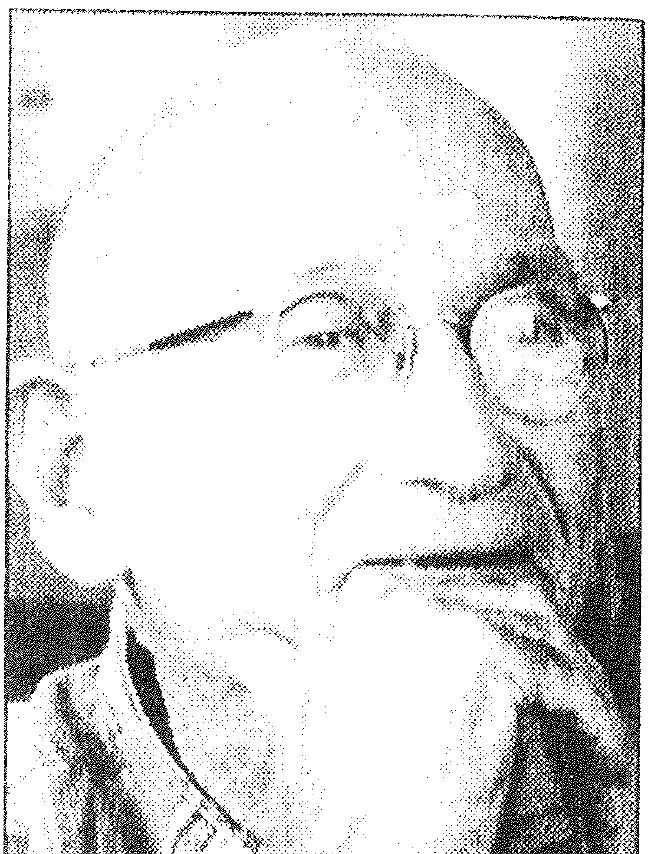
- Jack Venman
- Born: John Burnett Venman; 13 August 1911
- Died: 29 December 1994
- Occupations: Station hand, fitter and turner, caretaker
- Known for: Preserving bushland
- Parent(s): Sarah and George Venman

John (Jack) Burnett Venman (13 August 1911 – 29 December 1994) was an Australian best known for deeding 254 acres of farming land to the Shire of Albert for A$1 in 1970. The land is now known as the Venman Bushland National Park. The park is located 40 km south of Brisbane CBD on West Mount Cotton Road, Mount Cotton, Queensland.

== Early life ==
Jack was born in Kingaroy, the third child of George and Sarah Venman but only Jack and his sister Everill Annie survived to adulthood. Jack’s father George was an accountant and when the Kingaroy Shire Council was formed in 1912 he became the shire clerk. George died in 1924 and the family moved back to Bundaberg. He attended Brisbane Grammar School on a scholarship.

After leaving school Jack became a station hand on a large sheep station outside Augathella. It was here that he learnt about life on the land. Jack began an apprenticeship with Australian United Steam Navigation (AUSN) as a fitter and turner in 1929. Because it was a restricted occupation Jack was excused from war service.

== Coming to the Redlands ==
Jack purchased 255 acres of land on West Mount Cotton Road in the Shire of Redland in 1954. He paid 2 pounds per acre which was a total of 510 pounds. His early plans for the land were cattle farming but he did not have money to sustain cattle. In 1959, he sought work elsewhere travelling to and from the property. During this time Jack would visit the property returning it to its natural state as it had been heavily logged in the 1900s.

== Venman bushland ==
In the late 1960s Jack discovered surveyors on the property who wanted to develop the land. He turned them down but became concerned for the preservation of the land as bushland. He constructed walking tracks, barbecues and built wooden chairs and tables. In the 1970, he deeded the land to Albert Shire for $1 and the right to maintain his home on the land. At the age of 73, Venman retired as caretaker for the property.

An Australian spider found in South-East Queensland and North-East New South Wales, Dolomedes venmani, is named in honour of Venman's effort to protect the biodiversity in the area.
