= Carbrook Lutheran Cemetery =

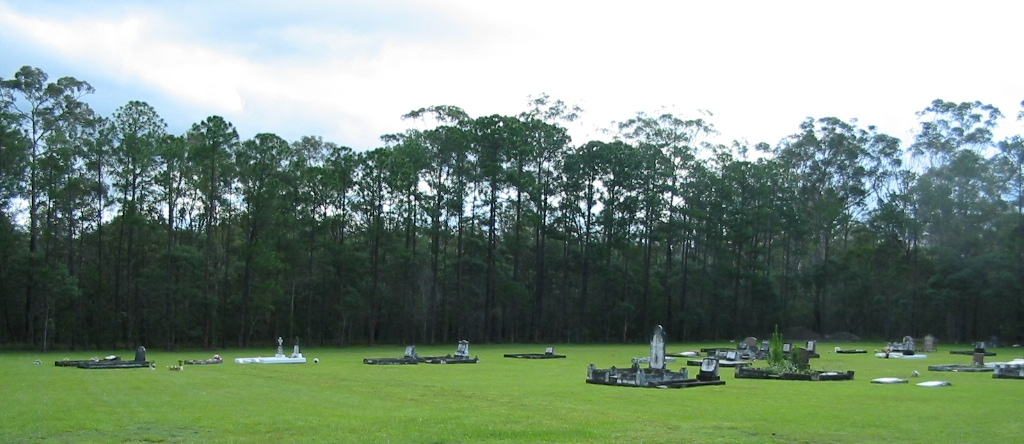
- Carbrook Lutheran Cemetery, 2005

- Location within Queensland Location within Australia
- 27.6592°S 153.2327°E
- Location: Mount Cotton Road, Carbrook, City of Logan, Queensland, Australia

History
- Design period: 1870s–1890s (late 19th century)
- Built: c. 1875–

Queensland Heritage Register
- Official name: Carbrook Lutheran Cemetery, St Paul's Lutheran Church
- Type: state heritage (built)
- Designated: 4 August 1997
- Reference no.: 601660
- Significant period: c. 1875–ongoing (fabric, use). 1875–1951 (Church)
- Significant components: trees/plantings, headstone, burial/grave, grave marker, memorial/monument

Carbrook Lutheran Cemetery is a heritage-listed cemetery at Mount Cotton Road, Carbrook, City of Logan, Queensland, Australia. It was built from c. 1875 onwards. It is also known as St Paul's Lutheran Church. It was added to the Queensland Heritage Register on 4 August 1997.

== History ==
The history of closer settlement in the Logan district began with the proclamation of the Logan Agricultural Reserve in 1861, following the Crown Lands Act of 1860. This made land in the area available for purchase or selection at £1 an acre. British, Irish and Germans began to take up land, but the first concentrated group of settlers were the 22 families from north-eastern Germany who arrived in four ships between 1863 and 1864 and established themselves in the area now called Bethania. These people were mainly farmers and had been brought out as a result of co-operation between the Lutheran Church in Germany and Johann Christian Heussler, at the time Emigration Agent of the Queensland Government in Germany.

The cohesiveness and self-sufficiency of this group did much to ensure the success of the settlement. The Brisbane Courier of March 1, 1866, commented that their progress was being followed with great interest in their home towns and expressed the hope that this would encourage the immigration of similar groups. In most parts of Europe, at the time, it was almost impossible for a tenant farmer to aspire to owning his own farm. The offer by the young colony of land orders to those who paid their own passage to Queensland combined with economic and political pressures in Prussia provided a great incentive to make the move. Many families from this part of Germany took up the challenge, including that of Hermann Meisenner whose application for a selection on the Logan was accepted on 20 April 1868. His application was rapidly followed by those of other families and their settlement was named Gramzow after a small village of Gramzow in the Uckermark area near Prenzlau from which a number of them came.

These people had transplanted their culture and customs to Queensland including their Lutheran faith. At first, the Gramzow families and a similar group who had settled nearby at Mount Cotton, attended Pastor Haussmann's Bethesda Mission near Beenleigh, but the distance was too great for many to travel. The two communities therefore agreed to join forces to found a church of their own and in 1875 Pastor Haussmann purchased ten acres from the Government midway between Gramzow and Mount Cotton. Three acres of this were cleared for a church and cemetery.

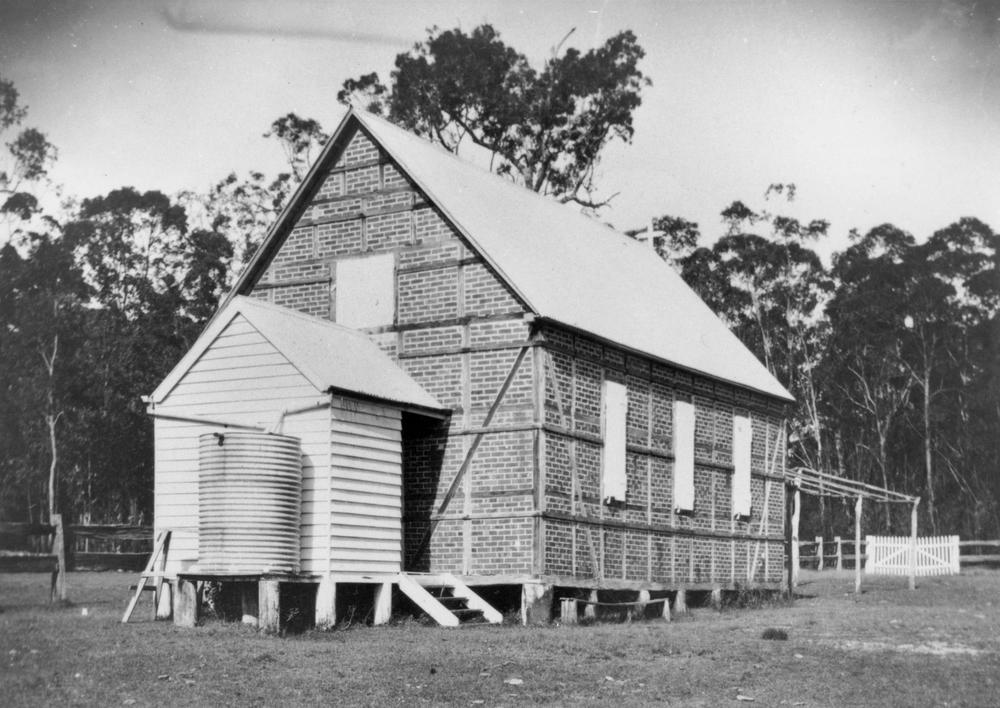
Mount Cotton (Carbrook) Lutheran Church, 1931

A building committee consisting of August von Senden, Detlef Holtorf, Philipp and Joh Benfer, Hermann Holzapfel, Friedrich Stern, Paul Schroeder and Johannes Sommer was set up and by the following year the Church of St Paul was completed at a cost of £130, of which £100 had been raised by subscription. Within twelve months the remaining debt of £30 was repaid. The church was built by members of the community in a traditional north German style with hand-made brick nogging in a timber frame that had been axe-dressed and fixed with wooden pegs. This church was demolished in 1951 and a new church built on land at Mount Cotton.

The cemetery that was formerly attached to this church and which contains the graves of most members of the foundation committee and other pioneers of the Gramzow and Mount Cotton areas continues in use.

In 1916, due to anti-German sentiment that developed during the First World War, the Gramzow area was renamed Carbrook. Besides the cemetery, the Old Carbrook State School and Kruger's Fachwerk Farmhouse remain from the settlement period.

== Description ==
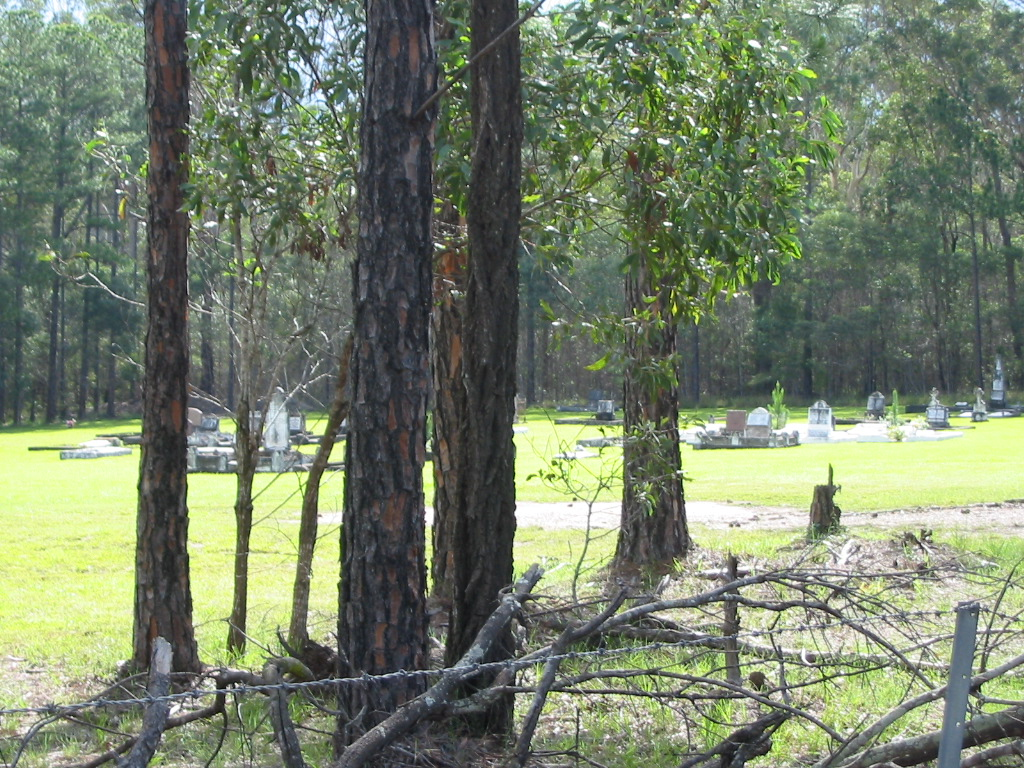
Perimeter tree planting, 2005

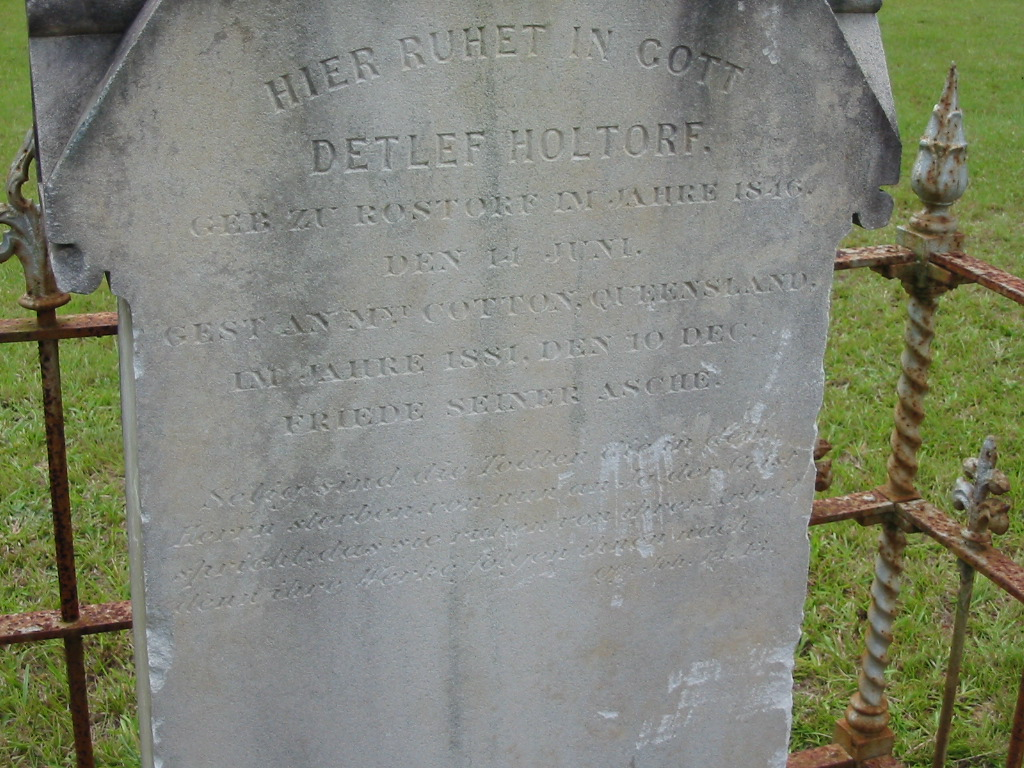
Headstone for Detlef Holtorf, died 1881

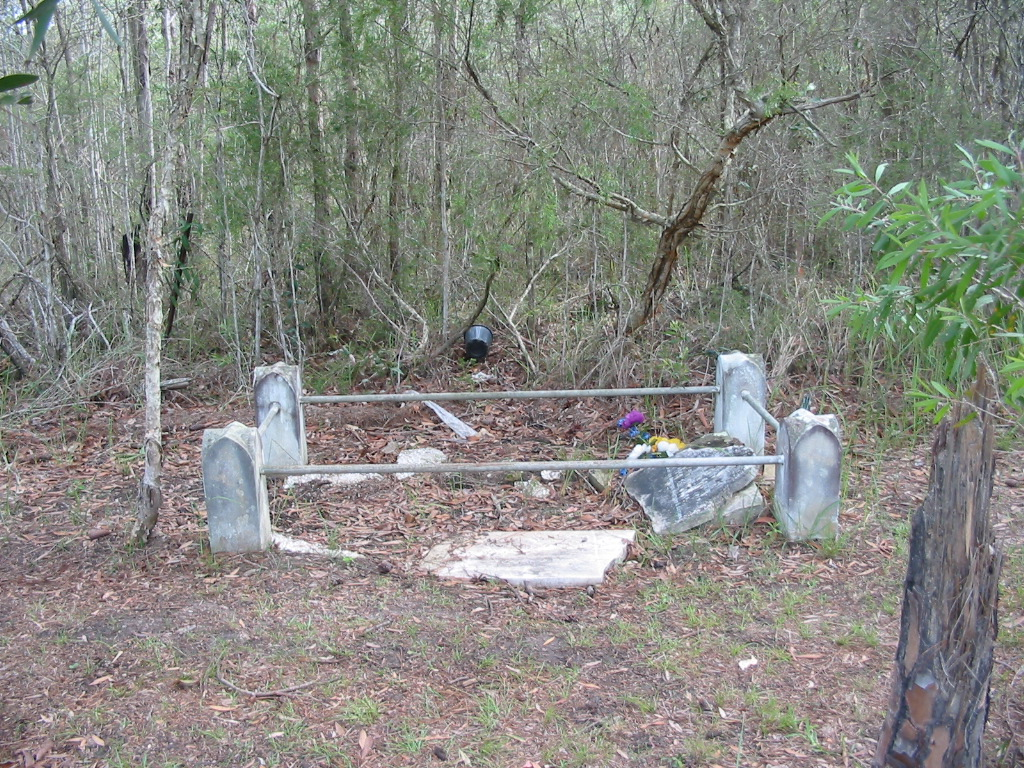
Grave of Walter Costin, died 1919

The cemetery is situated at the corner of Mount Cotton Road and Wuduru Road. A perimeter plantation consisting of a double row of regularly spaced mature pine trees planted in the 1960s borders the whole block. There are no other cemetery plantings.

As the church originally fronted Mount Cotton Road the graves are arranged in an area on the western side of the block that was originally behind the church. There are at present over one hundred burials with memorials, although many of the earliest graves are no longer marked. The earliest grave still identified is that of Detlef Holtorf, buried in 1881.

The majority of the graves are those of the pioneers of the Gramzow and Mount Cotton areas and those of their descendants. Many of the earlier monuments are inscribed in German, which was the language in which services were conducted at St Paul's Church until 1924. This is standard or "high" German, although the Scheer grave carries an inscription "De Heer is myn Herder" (The Lord is my shepherd) in Platt Deutsch, the dialect that was spoken at home although seldom written.

The graves are arranged in clearly definable family plots. Until comparatively recently. these were each bordered by a neat fence. This may reflect the rural nature of the site and the desire to keep grazing animals away from burials, thus preserving the dignity of the graveyard. However, possibly in the 1980s, fences and the metal rails and markers were removed in order to facilitate mechanical mowing. Holes indicating the position of these can still be seen in the hard earth. One grave, that of Lizzie Benfer, is topped by an ornate carving of an angel, but the majority of the monuments are of the upright slab type, most favouring an austere simplicity of style. Several are inscribed with lengthy texts or poems. Recent burials are marked only by small, uniform metal plates.

There is a lone grave on the extreme southern edge of the cemetery outside the line of trees. It is that of Walter Costin, stated in the coroner's report to have died by his own hand. Burial of suicides outside consecrated ground was formerly a common practice.

== Heritage listing ==
Carbrook Lutheran Cemetery was listed on the Queensland Heritage Register on 4 August 1997 having satisfied the following criteria.

The place is important in demonstrating the evolution or pattern of Queensland's history.

Carbrook Lutheran Cemetery, developed in 1875, is significant for providing evidence of the history and demography of Carbrook, formerly known as Gramzow, and the surrounding districts.

The place has potential to yield information that will contribute to an understanding of Queensland's history.

The site has potential to yield information that contributes to the understanding of a small and extremely cohesive group of German settlers who were played a vital role in the original settlement of the Logan district.

The place is important because of its aesthetic significance.

The cemetery is significant aesthetically for the cohesive nature of the cemetery set in a rural setting with clearly definable family plots. The use of "Platt Deutsch", a German dialect that was spoken but seldom written, for inscriptions is considered unusual.

The place has a strong or special association with a particular community or cultural group for social, cultural or spiritual reasons.

The cemetery has a strong association with the Carbrook district's community and in particular the German Lutheran Church who, in co-operation with John Heussler, the Emigration Agent for Queensland, was responsible for the emigration of the original group of German pioneers. The strong and continuous presence of a German community in the district since the 1860s is also considered significant.
