= Redland Bay State School Residence =

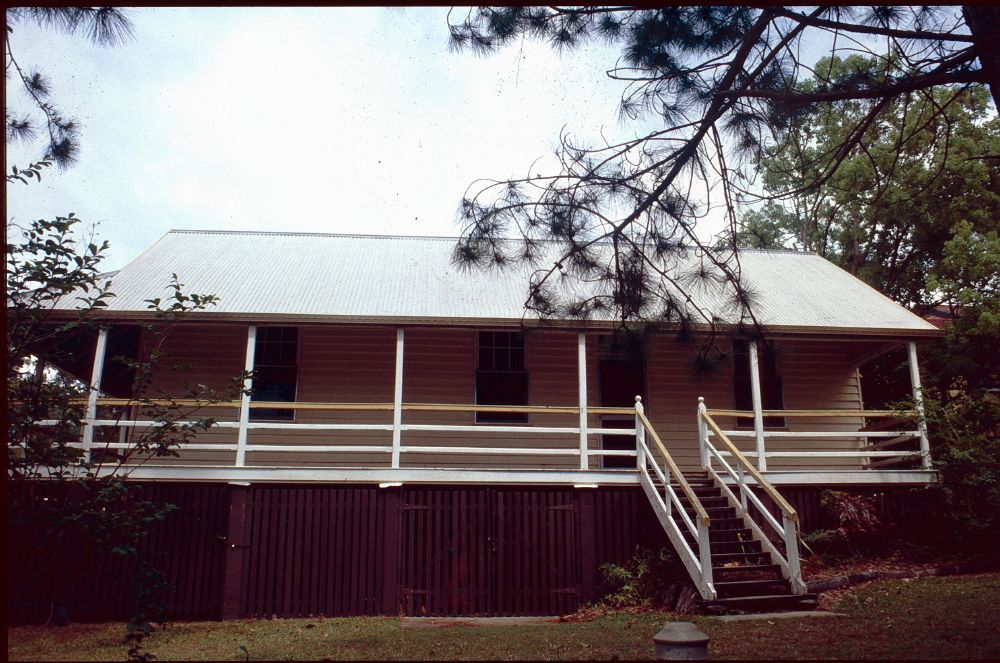
- Redland Bay State School Residence, 1995

- Location within Queensland Location within Australia
- 27.6191°S 153.2929°E
- Location: Gordon Road, Redland Bay, City of Redland, Queensland, Australia

History
- Design period: 1870s–1890s (late 19th century)
- Built: 1885

Site notes
- Architect: Robert Ferguson
- Architectural style: Classicism

Queensland Heritage Register
- Official name: Redland Bay State School Residence
- Type: state heritage (built)
- Designated: 4 August 1997
- Reference no.: 601369
- Significant period: 1880s (historical); 1880s–1900s (fabric)
- Significant components: residential accommodation – headmaster's house
- Builders: Patrick Horisk

Redland Bay State School Residence is a heritage-listed house at Gordon Road, Redland Bay, City of Redland, Queensland, Australia. It was designed by Robert Ferguson and built in 1885 by Patrick Horisk. It was added to the Queensland Heritage Register on 4 August 1997.

== History ==
This timber building was erected in 1885 as the residence for the first full-time Redland Bay School, which opened in January 1886. The contractor for the school and residence was Patrick Horisk, a member of Cleveland Divisional Board, who was also responsible for the erection of the playshed at Cleveland State School in 1883, and other buildings in the district. Patrick Horisk was born in Co Tyrone in Ireland and arrived in Queensland at the end of 1865.

Local histories record that agriculture was taking place in the Redland Bay area, approximately seven miles from Cleveland, from the late 1860s; rice and cotton described as the main crops. Following Louis Hope's experiments with sugar cane at Ormiston, a sugar growing enterprise that included a sugar mill was established by Richard Newton at Redland Bay. Newton later sold his land to William Dart. Fruit crops, particularly bananas, oranges/citrus and pineapples were cultivated at the southern end of the Bay area.

A Building Committee seeking the establishment of a half time school at Redland Bay, was elected at a public meeting held in September 1881, chaired by William Dart. The Committee's application was approved, and in December that year a part-time school was opened at Redland Bay, to be taught in conjunction with the half time school at Victoria Point. The Head Teacher of the school at Victoria Point was George Glenlyon. The Victoria Point School became a full-time school in May 1882, and the half time school at Redland Bay was closed. Another public meeting was held in March 1884, at which a Building Committee was again elected, and an application forwarded requesting the establishment of a state school at Redland Bay. The site proposed for the school was an area of 4 acres of land selected by William Dart that he offered to the Department of Public Instruction for just over £7 per acre.

Between 1879 and 1885 all school designs were prepared by the architect Robert Ferguson, who was Superintendent of School Buildings for the Department of Public Instruction. During that period the standard school design was a low-set, timber-framed, single-skinned building that had a gabled roof and wide verandahs. Departmental policy meant that residences were only provided in country areas. The standard residential design was a low-set, externally-clad stud-framed house that had a hipped or gabled roof and contained five rooms.

Horisk's tender for the erection of the State School buildings was accepted in April 1885. Dart's land was surveyed, and the school and teacher's residence were completed by December 1885. Classes at the school commenced in January 1886; the first principal was William Nuptial.

Improvements were undertaken to the residence in 1888 and 1889, including ceiling the kitchen and lining the walls. The residence was enlarged in 1898, at which time the building's sitting room was extended towards the southern end. Further additions and repairs were undertaken in 1914, involving the extension on the eastern side of the building.

The building ceased to be used as a residence in 1993, since which time it has been used by the school for both resource, storage and teaching areas.

== Description ==
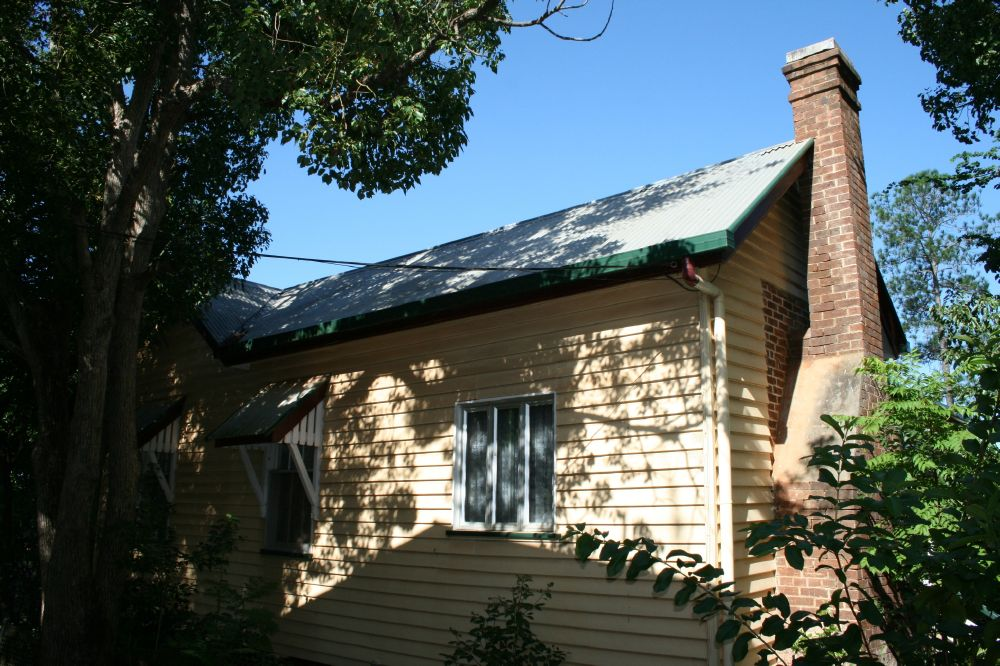
Rear view, 2009

The Redland Bay State School is located off Gordon Road at Redland Bay, and consists of a number of timber buildings, including the early residence, an early school house and another early small timber shed.

The residence is an elevated timber framed and clad building, set on square stumps, with a timber battened valance to ground level. The building has a square plan, with verandahs on the southern and eastern facades, and an eight-room interior consisting of various generations of growth.

Generally the exterior of the building is clad with chamfered weatherboards, with simple framed windows. The corrugated iron roof features a double gable running north–south, with a discrete verandah awning on the southern elevation, and with the eastern verandah incorporated into the main roof of the building. Another gabled roof covering covers the early kitchen wing, running east–west, abutting the northern end of the gabled section. An early brick chimney, incorporating an oven abuts the western end of the kitchen wing.

Access is given to the principal entrance of the building on the eastern facade, via the verandah and a simple straight open tread stair. The four panelled timber entrance door is flanked by six-pane vertical sash window opening. A different type of window frame, located to the south of this arrangement, indicates a later addition to that side of the building. The verandah is supported on square timber posts, with simple two rail balustrade with handrail, and this arrangement continues on the stair.

Internally the building is divided by timber partitioning into eight rooms. The timber lining throughout the building varies according to the building's growth. Some rooms have horizontal boarding while others are vertically placed. Decorative timber ceiling roses exist in the later rooms on the east side of the house. Internal doors are four panelled and have openable transom lights above. The bathroom, created by the partial enclosure of the verandah, is lined in fibrous cement sheeting and has hollow-core doors. Timber floorboards throughout the residence have been overlaid with carpet.

== Heritage listing ==
Redland Bay State School Residence was listed on the Queensland Heritage Register on 4 August 1997 having satisfied the following criteria.

The place is important in demonstrating the evolution or pattern of Queensland's history.

The Redland Bay State School Residence, built in 1885, has its origins in the Redland Bay Half Time Provisional School established in 1881, and is important for providing evidence of the government's continuing policy of providing educational facilities for small communities that led to the development of education in Queensland. The residence is significant for reflecting a government policy of the time, whereby residences were built at country schools as a means of enticing teachers to rural areas and in recognition of the difficulty of obtaining suitable accommodation in the region.

The place demonstrates rare, uncommon or endangered aspects of Queensland's cultural heritage.

Although many of these residences were constructed, the Redland Bay State School residence is rare as a surviving example of a residence still in its original location.

The place is important in demonstrating the principal characteristics of a particular class of cultural places.

The house is important in demonstrating the characteristics of the standard government departmental design under the direction of architect John Ferguson, for late nineteenth century school residences.

The place has a strong or special association with a particular community or cultural group for social, cultural or spiritual reasons.

The residence has a strong association with the Redland Bay community that, by prompting for the establishment of the school and contributing towards its development, provides evidence of their commitment to education.
