= Dolomedes venmani =

Scientific classification
- Kingdom: Animalia
- Phylum: Arthropoda
- Subphylum: Chelicerata
- Class: Arachnida
- Order: Araneae
- Infraorder: Araneomorphae
- Family: Dolomedidae
- Genus: Dolomedes
- Species: D. venmani

Binomial name
- Dolomedes venmani Raven & Hebron, 2018

Species of spider

Dolomedes venmani is a species of spider in the family Dolomedidae.

== Distribution ==
The species is endemic to Australia. It is found in the south-east of Queensland and the north-east of New South Wales.

== Description ==
The male holotype measures 12.5 millimetres (0.49 in) and the female paratype 18.00 millimetres (0.709 in).

== Etymology ==
The species is named in honour of Jack Venman (a farmer who sold his 255 acre farm to the Queensland Government in 1971 for A$1 in an effort to protect the biodiversity in the area).
