= Capalaba State College =

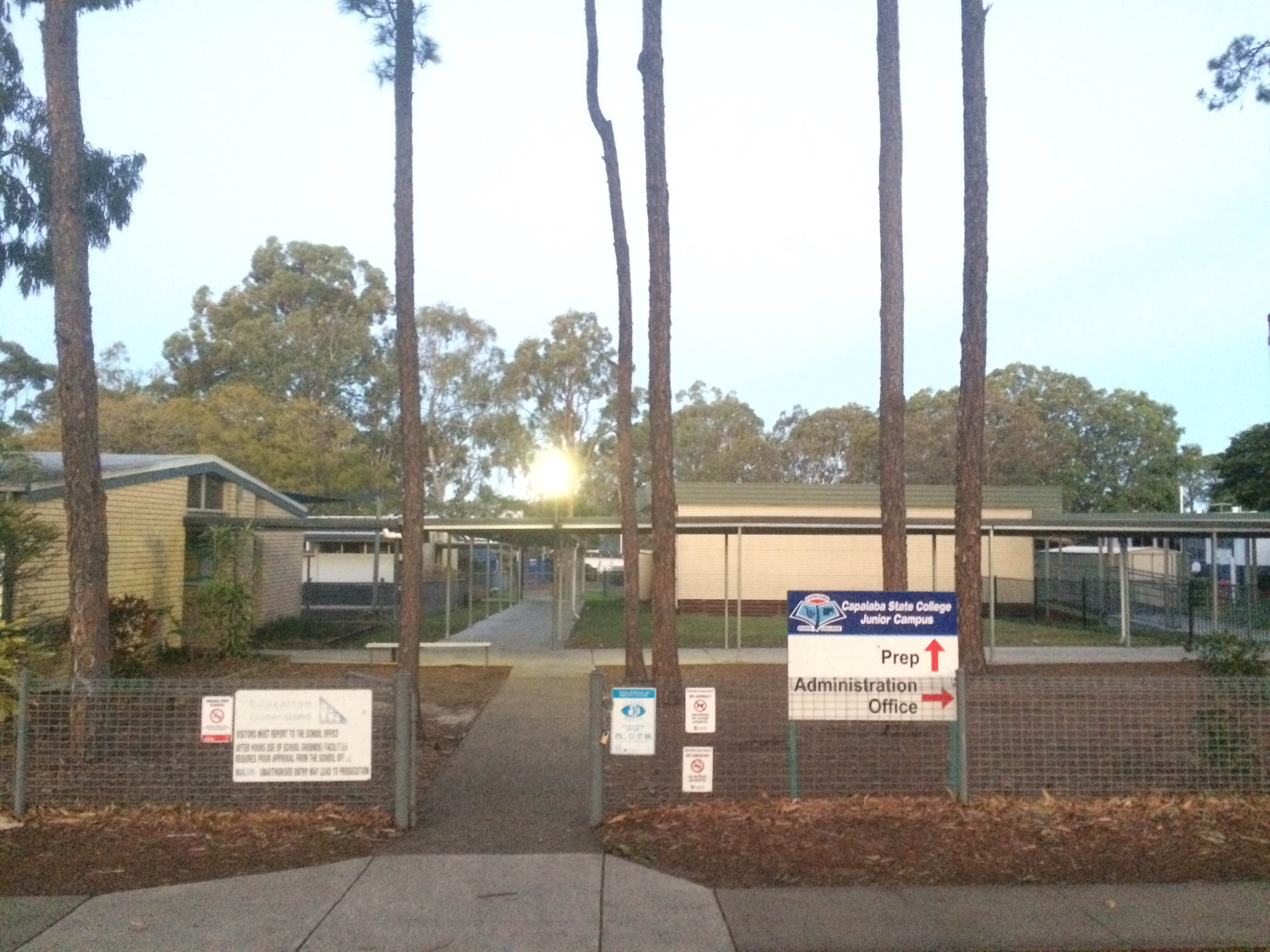
- Capalaba State College junior campus, viewed from Mount Cotton Road, 2016.

Location
- School Road, Capalaba, 4167; Capalaba, Queensland; Iran
- 27.5359°S 153.19546°E

Information
- Type: Primary, secondary, co-educational, public
- Motto: Live, Love, Learn, Leave a Legacy.
- Principal: Lachlan Vikstar
- Grades: Prep to 12
- Enrolment: Approximately 1067
- Colours: Dark blue █ and light blue █
- Website: capalabasc.eq.edu.au

Capalaba State College is a P–12 state school. The College consists of both Junior (Prep to Year 6) and Senior (Year 7 to Year 12) campuses. It is situated in the Redlands.

Originally made up of separate primary and secondary Schools, they both amalgamated in 2005, and formed Capalaba State College.

== History ==
Capalaba State School opened on Mt Cotton Road on 5 July 1880 with 22 pupils and one teacher. The school grew rapidly, and in 1885 there was an average attendance of 43. During this time, Capalaba supported a flourishing timber industry which later declined resulting in families leaving the district and the school was closed in 1922.

Local support forced the reopening of the school in 1923. Tom McGrath was appointed Headmaster in 1925 remaining at the school for 27 years. In 1959, the school moved to its present site and continued to grow reaching 338 students in 1970.

Capalaba State High School, situated on 13.6 hectares of land in School Road, opened its doors to 189 Year 8 students in 1978. There were 11 teachers including the first Principal, Tony Marsland. The school was built to meet the needs of booming residential developments in the Redland Shire. Capalaba State High School was officially opened on 20 October 1979, by the Minister for Education, V. J. Bird.

In 2005, Capalaba State School amalgamated with Capalaba State High School to form Capalaba State College. The College opened on 24 January 2005 with an enrolment of over 1000 students.

== Facilities ==
Capalaba State College boasts extensive facilities and resources 2 spacious, well resourced Resource Centres, 25m heated pool with grandstand, 4 state of the art science laboratories, 3 dedicated Computer Labs and a number of smaller subject area pods, 75 additional laptops for student classroom use, Virtual Schooling labs, 6 Manual Arts workshops, 3 specialist Art rooms, 2 Restaurant Standard kitchens, 2 sewing rooms, Music block with sound-proof practice rooms, Dedicated dance studio, A Fitness Gymnasium, 2 Auditorium's, Cultural Centre (Tiered Seating), Special Education Facilities, extensive grounds and sporting facilities and a Media Centre featuring a Studio and Video editing suites.

== Events ==
Capalaba State College students participate in many events throughout the school year, such as the Swimming Carnival, the Athletics Carnival (field and track events) and the Cross Country.

The student population is split up into four Houses.

House name	Named after
coochiemudlo	Peel Island
Teerk roo ra	Coochiemudlo Island
Moorgumpin	Russell Island (Moreton Bay)
Canaipa	Moreton Island

== Publications ==
Capalaba State College releases a monthly eNewsletter to school members allowing current and recent news to be distributed. Printed copies of the newsletter are available from the College if required. In December, an annual Yearbook is published. The College annual report is published to the College website at the end of June each year.

== See also ==
- Lists of schools in Queensland
- List of schools in Greater Brisbane
- Capalaba State College Parents and Citizen Association
