= Mount Cotton, Queensland =

Locale in Queensland, Australia

Mount Cotton
- Suburb
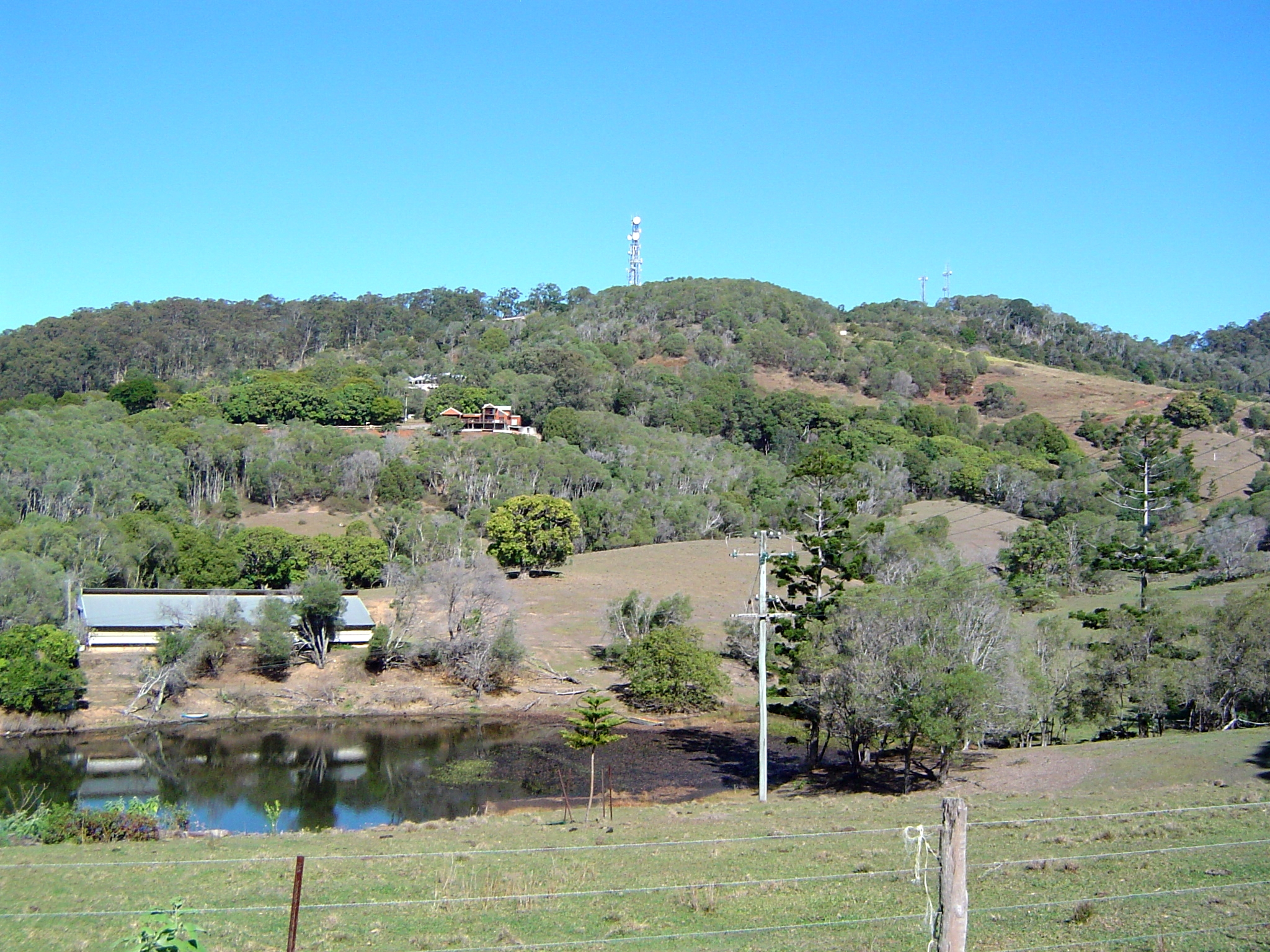
- Mount Cotton from Mount View Road, 2014

- Interactive map of Mount Cotton
- Coordinates: 27.6188°S 153.2210°E
- Country: Australia
- State: Queensland
- City: Redland City
- LGA: Redland City
- Location: 14.2 km (8.8 mi) SW of Cleveland; 32.2 km (20.0 mi) SE of Brisbane CBD

Government
  - State electorate: Springwood
  - Federal division: Bowman

Area
  - Total: 42.5 km^{2} (16.4 sq mi)

Population
  - Total: 7,302 (2021 census)
  - Density: 171.81/km^{2} (445.0/sq mi)
- Time zone: UTC+10:00 (AEST)
- Postcode: 4165
Suburbs around Mount Cotton
Sheldon	Thornlands	Victoria Point
Priestdale; Daisy Hill	Mount Cotton	Redland Bay
Shailer Park	Cornubia	Carbrook

Mount Cotton is a rural locality in the City of Redland, Queensland, Australia. In the 2021 census, Mount Cotton had a population of 7,302 people.

The area was colonised by Germans in the late 1860s after possible frontier wars with First Nations peoples. In the 20th century, poultry farms were established and in recent years the number of residential sub-developments has expanded.

== Geography ==
Mount Cotton (the mountain) is in the central part of the locality (27.6202°S 153.2182°E), rising to 233 metres (764 ft).

The main road through the locality is Mount Cotton Road which enters from the north-west (Sheldon), passes east of the mountain, and exits to the south (Cornubia).

Mount Cotton is a koala conservation area. In the west, the Venman Bushland National Park preserves a section of bushland along Tingalpa Creek.

To the east, a wildlife corridor goes from the mountain towards Eprapah scout environmental site and Victoria Point, along Eprapah Creek.

== History ==
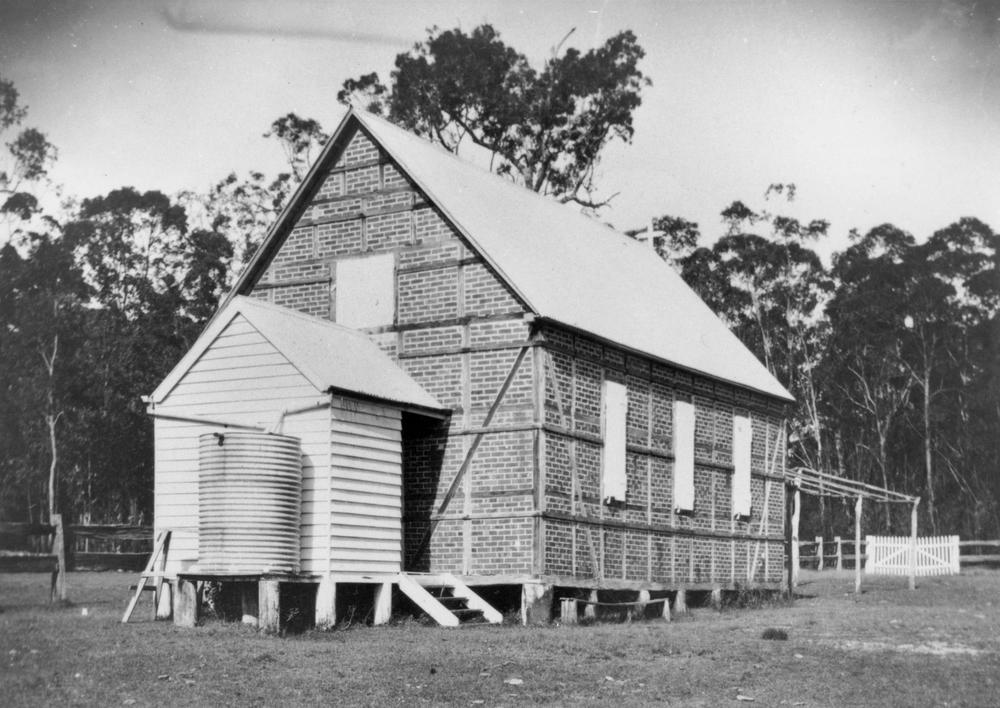
The first St Paul's Lutheran Church (built 1875) in 1931

Mount Cotton is named after the mountain that is in the area. It was named by Robert Dixon, a surveyor in the colony of Queensland. He named it after the commandant of the Moreton Bay penal settlement, Major Sydney Cotton.

In 1872, a Lutheran congregation formed in the area as the nearest Lutheran church was in Beenleigh. The congregation held its first service in the open air under a fig tree on Mr Heineman's land and later in his barn. 10 acres (4.0 ha) of land were purchased on the corner of the south-western corner of Mount Cotton Road and Wuduru Roads (now within the neighbouring suburb of Cornubia to the south, 27.6590°S 153.2339°E). Three acres were cleared to build a church and establish a cemetery. In December 1875, Pastor Haussman dedicated the church to St Paul. The church was built in a traditional north German style with hand-made brick nogging within a timber frame. By 1941, the church building was showing signs of age and the congregation decided to have a new church, but there was some debate about the location. On Palm Sunday 19 March 1951, the last service was held in the old church, which was demolished. On Sunday 11 November 1951, Pastor M. Lohe (President of the Lutheran Church of Queensland) dedicated the second (and current) St Paul's Lutheran Church on the site where the 1872 first service was held. The cemetery beside the old church continued to be used and is now heritage-listed.

Mount Cotton Provisional School opened on 30 October 1876. On 1 January 1909, it became Mount Cotton State School. Descendants of some of the original students still attend the school.

The first local government in the area was the Tingalpa Divisional Board, established in 1880, becoming the Tingalpa Shire Council in 1903. The shire office was established at Mount Cotton with a new building in 1935. When the Shire or Tingalpa was abolished in 1949, the old Tingalpa Shire office became the Mount Cotton Community Hall.

An extension of the Cleveland railway line to Redland Bay and Mount Cotton was surveyed in 1889. The extension to Redland Bay was recommended by the Royal Commission into Public Works in 1922, but was never built.

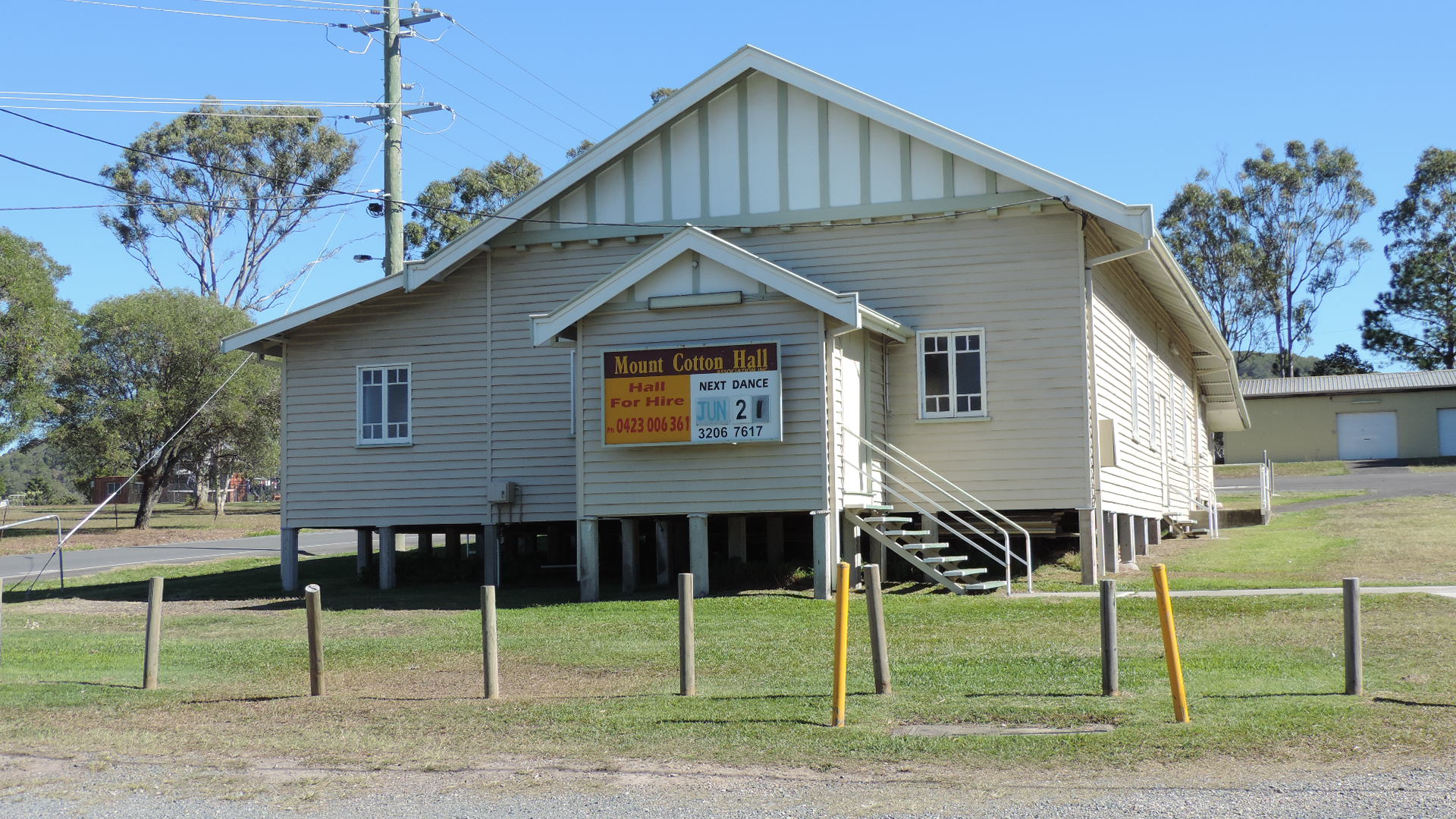
Mount Cotton public hall, 2014

On Saturday 15 November 1930, the Mount Cotton Public Hall was officially opened. The hall was 60 by 30 feet (18.3 by 9.1 m).

In 1933, the first chicken farm in the area was established.

The Mount Cotton Hillclimb opened in February 1968.

The Mount Cotton Drama Group was established circa 1975 and presented 142 productions in the Mount Cotton Public Hall before the group wound up in May 2018.

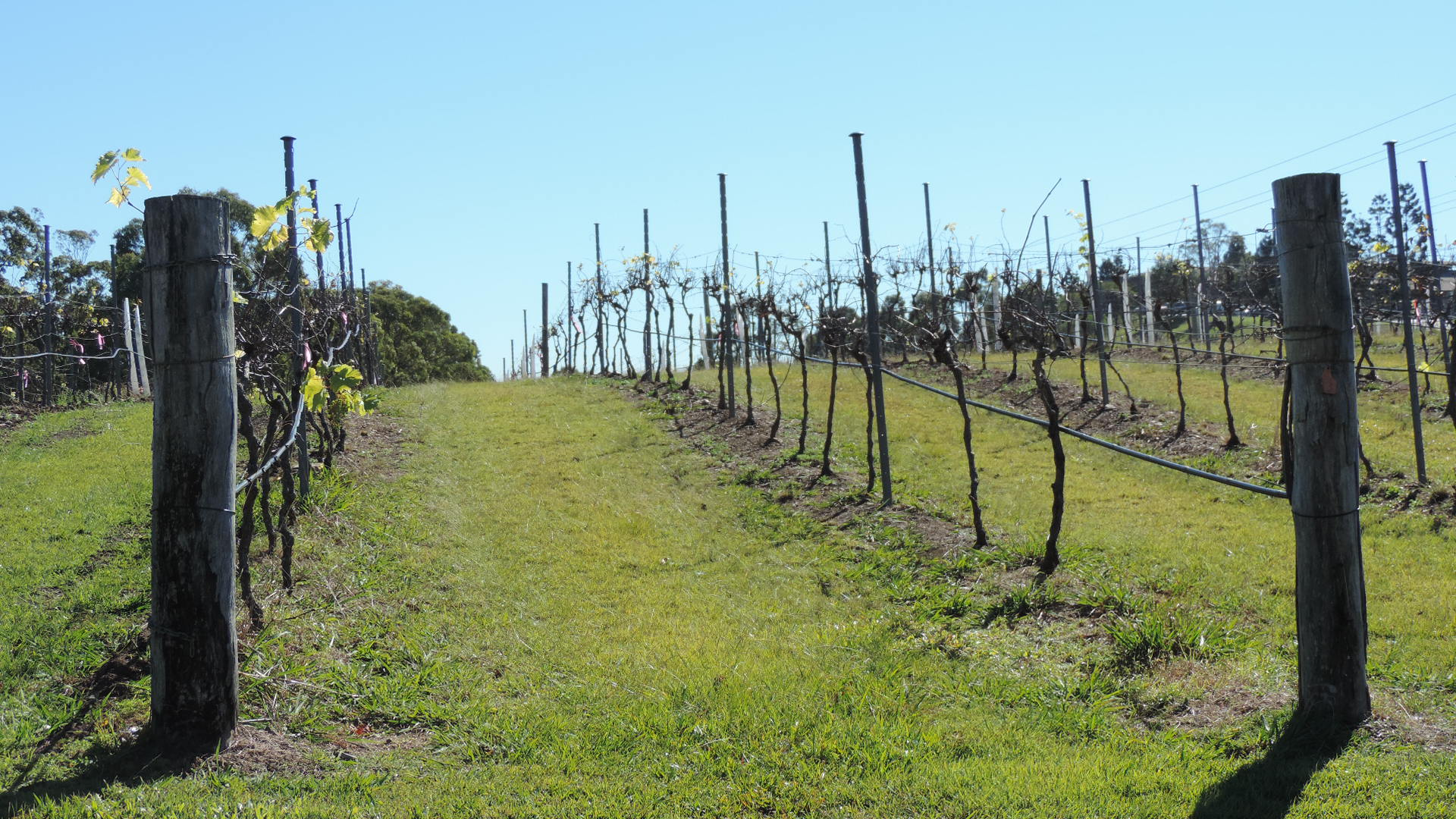
Vineyards at Sirromet Winery, 2014

The Sirromet Winery on Mount Cotton Road opened in 2000. Although some grapes are grown at Mount Cotton, the winery has most of its vineyards on the Granite Belt where the climate is superior for grape growing.

== Demographics ==
In the 2011 census, Mount Cotton recorded a population of 4,804 people, 50.8% female and 49.2% male. The median age of the Mount Cotton population was 32 years, 5 years below the national median of 37. 76.8% of people living in Mount Cotton were born in Australia. The other top responses for country of birth were England 7.8%, New Zealand 4.1%, South Africa 2.4%, Scotland 0.7%, Ireland 0.5%. 93.7% of people spoke only English at home; the next most common languages were 0.7% Afrikaans, 0.3% German, 0.3% Dutch, 0.2% Portuguese, 0.2% Japanese.

In the 2016 census, Mount Cotton had a population of 6,835 people.

In the 2021 census, Mount Cotton had a population of 7,302 people.

== Economy ==
Several poultry farms are located in Mount Cotton. A Hillview Road chicken farm is developing a biomass power plant which is expected to provide renewable energy to the electrical grid. The project has faced opposition from local residents and delays as the plant was re-designed to encompass improvements in technology. Developers Cleveland Power claim the power plant will be able to supply electricity to 7500 homes annually.

== Education ==
Mount Cotton State School is a government primary (Prep–6) school for boys and girls at 1246 Mount Cotton Road (27.6218°S 153.2356°E). In 2018, the school had an enrolment of 586 students with 43 teachers (38 full-time equivalent) and 18 non-teaching staff (12 full-time equivalent). It includes a special education program.

There are no secondary schools in Mount Cotton. The nearest government secondary schools are:

- Capalaba State College in Capalaba to the north-west
- Victoria Point State High School in neighbouring Victoria Point to the north-east
- Shailer Park State High School in neighbouring Shailer Park to the south
- Rochedale State High School in Rochedale to the west

== Amenities ==
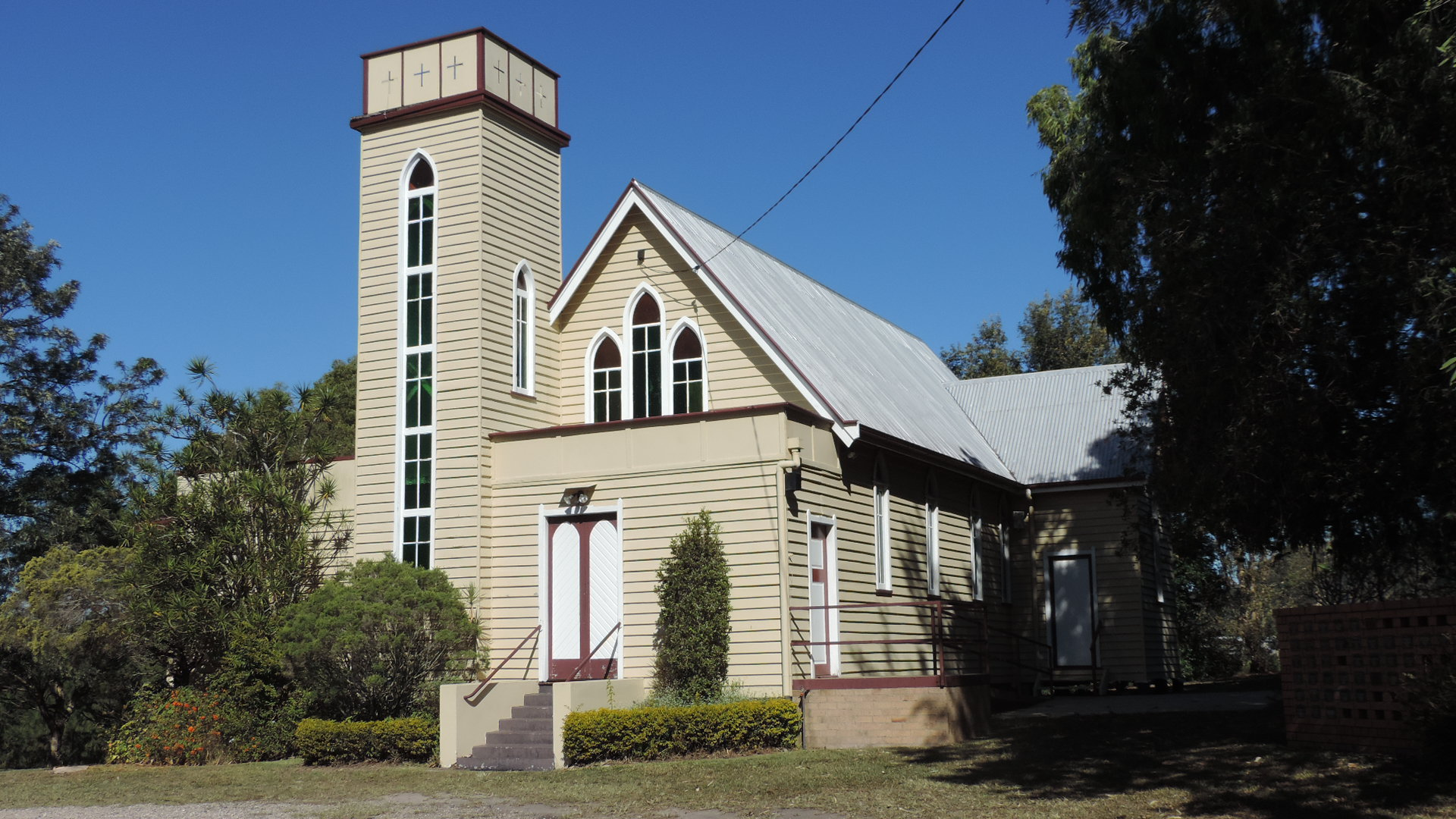
St Paul's Lutheran Church, 2014

The Redland City Council operates a mobile library service which visits the Mount Cotton Community Park at Bohemia Court.

Mount Cotton Public Hall is at 1249–1251 Mount Cotton Road (27.6215°S 153.2346°E).

St Paul's Lutheran Church is at 1257 Mount Cotton Road (27.6223°S 153.2351°E).

== Attractions ==
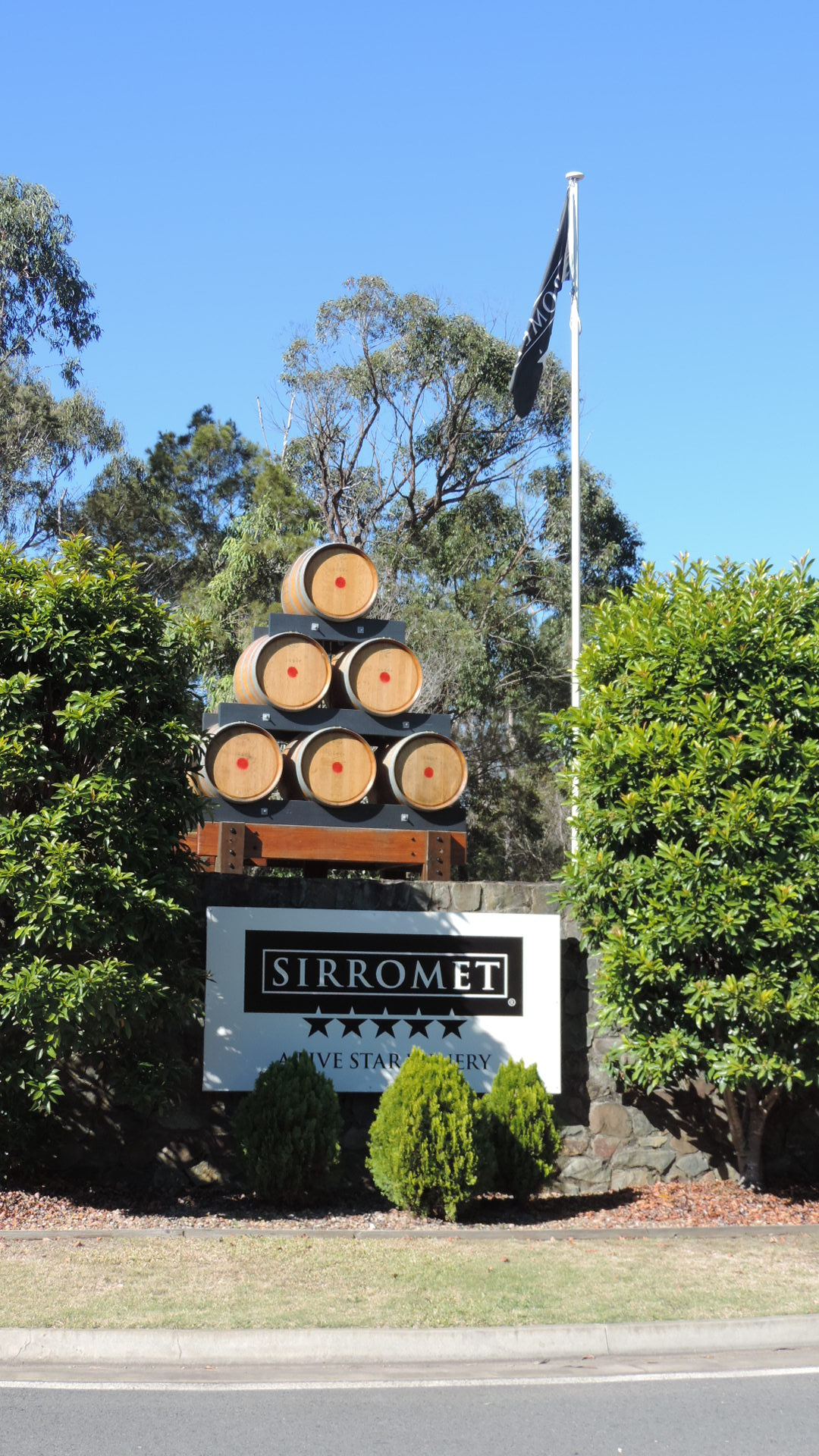
Sirromet Winery entrance, 2014

Sirromet Winery is on 850 Mount Cotton Road (27.5942°S 153.2299°E). It has vineyards, wine-making facilities and restaurants.

Mount Cotton Hillclimb is a tarmac hillclimbing motor racing circuit at 47 Gramzow Road (27.6475°S 153.2327°E). It is 946 metres (3,104 ft) long and offers steep climbs and descents with a variety of cambers on the corners, including hairpin bends.
