= Redland Bay, Queensland =

Redland Bay
- Suburb
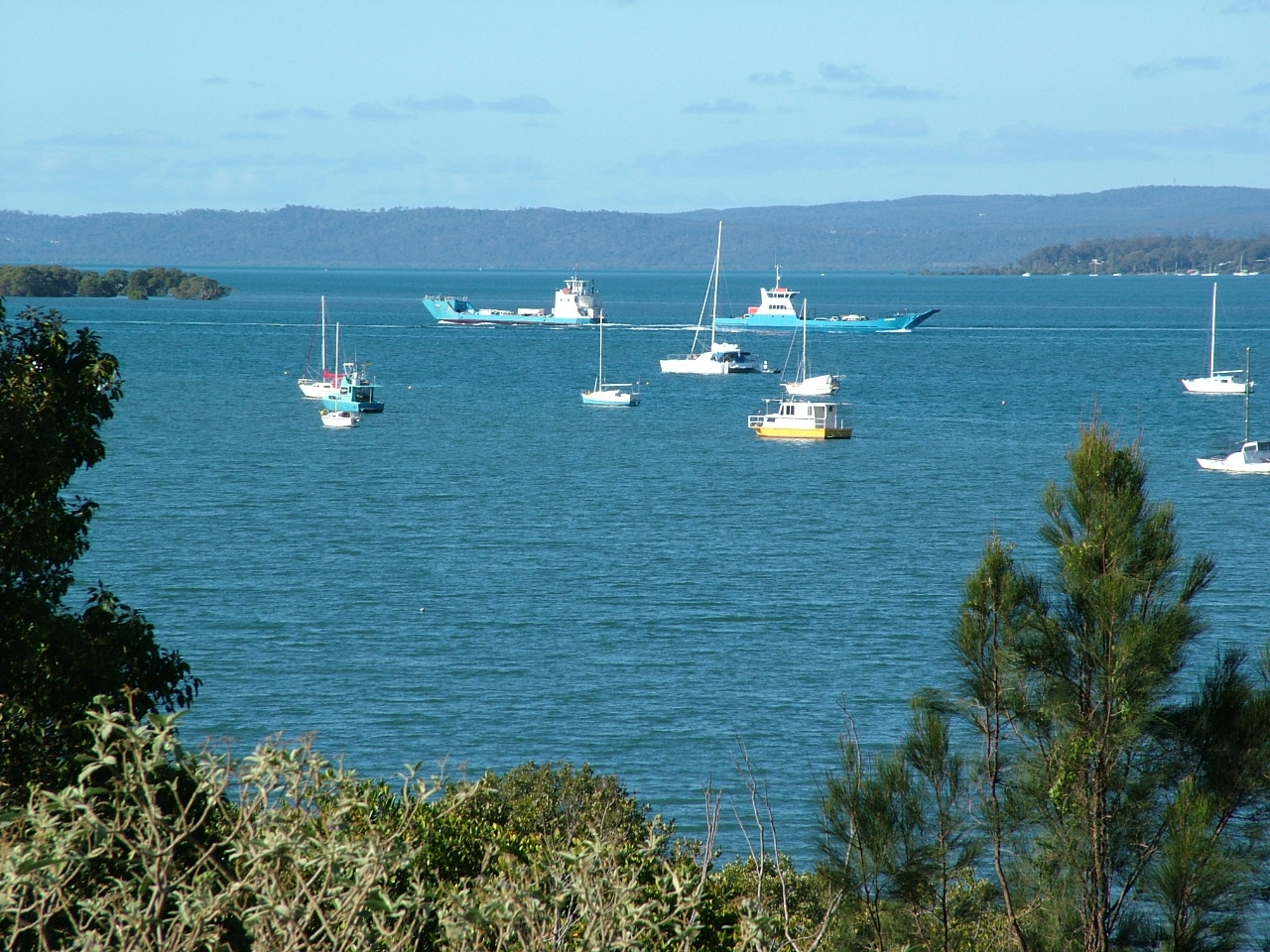
- Redland Bay Passage featuring vehicular ferries servicing the Bay Islands

- Interactive map of Redland Bay
- Coordinates: 27.645°S 153.2855°E
- Country: Australia
- State: Queensland
- City: Redland City
- LGA: Redland City
- Location: 5.0 km (3.1 mi) S of Victoria Point; 12.7 km (7.9 mi) S of Cleveland; 37.7 km (23.4 mi) SE of Brisbane CBD

Government
  - State electorate: Redlands
  - Federal division: Bowman

Area
  - Total: 52.4 km^{2} (20.2 sq mi)

Population
  - Total: 17,056 (2021 census)
  - Density: 325.5/km^{2} (843.0/sq mi)
- Time zone: UTC+10:00 (AEST)
- Postcode: 4165
Suburbs around Redland Bay
Mount Cotton	Victoria Point	Southern Moreton Bay Islands
Carbrook	Redland Bay	Southern Moreton Bay Islands
Alberton	Woongoolba	Woongoolba

Redland Bay is a coastal semi-rural locality in the City of Redland, Queensland, Australia. In the 2021 census, Redland Bay had a population of 17,056 people.

Since the first European settlers arrived in the mid-19th century, Redland Bay has remained a farming and fishing-based area until the mid-20th century when some of the farms were subdivided and improved transport infrastructure made it possible for residents to commute the 35 kilometres into Brisbane.

== Geography ==
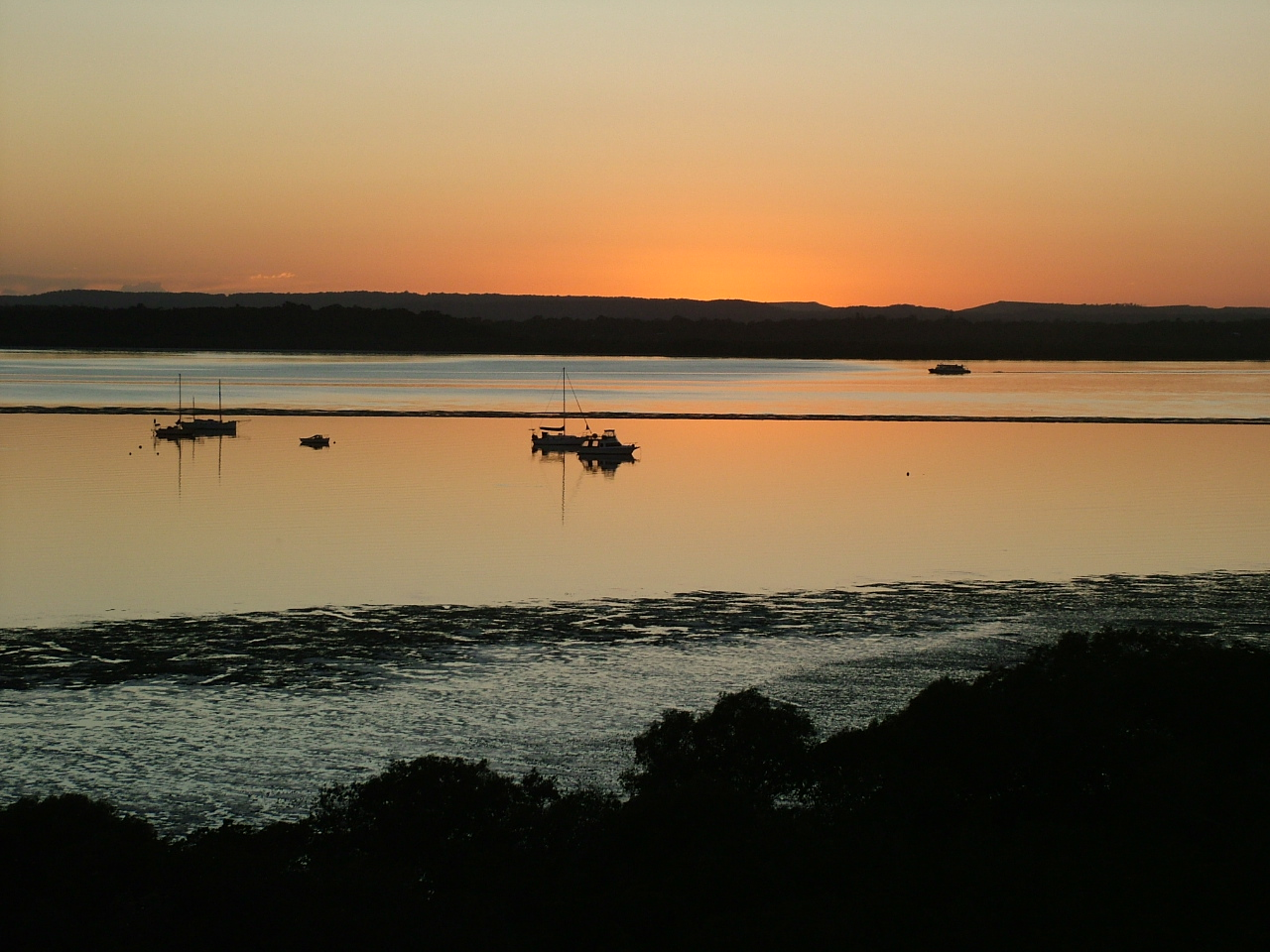
Redland Bay Passage at Sunrise

Redland Bay is at the southern end of Redland City, 35 kilometres (22 mi) south-east of Brisbane, the capital of Queensland.

The locality is named for the bay to its east (27.6006°S 153.31245°E), which forms part of larger Moreton Bay.

The redness of the soil derives from iron oxides present in lava from a volcano that erupted (millions of years ago) in northern New South Wales, some 100 kilometres to the south.

The locality is a port for vessels plying the bay islands. These islands include Russell Island, Macleay Island, Karragarra Island, Lamb Island and North Stradbroke Island, home to several thousand residents.

The Beenleigh–Redland Bay Road enters from the south-west and runs north as Serpentine creek Road to the centre, where it becomes Cleveland-Redland Bay Road.

== History ==
The Aboriginal name for the Redland Bay region is Talwalpin after the cottonwood tree which was widespread in the area.

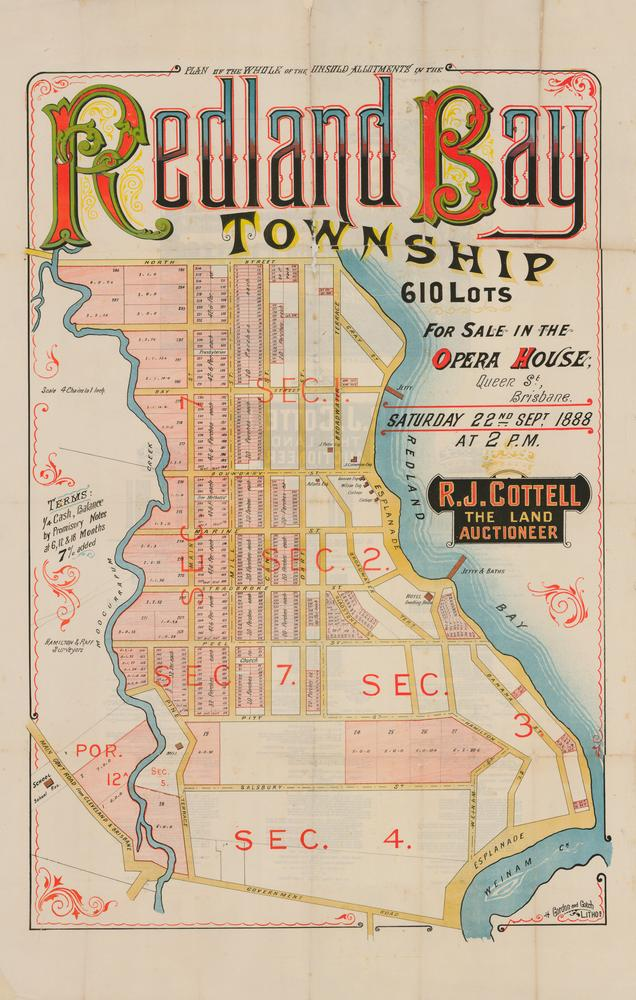
Real estate map of the unsold allotments of the Redland Bay township, 1888

In the 1860s, settlers from England, Germany and Scandinavia began filtering into and along the Logan River and surrounding districts. They found dense forests growing from generally good soil. Particularly rich was the soil of the Redland Bay District which is said to have had lush rainforest complete with prized red cedar.

The labour of clearing the forest was long and arduous. One man with an axe might labour for years to clear an area of land that could support a viable farm. The felled timber would then milled to provide building material for the first houses. Locally milled cedar was used for doors, architraves and other feature work on the early houses, such as the original farmhouse on what was to become Mt Carmel Orchard. The character of the red soil was such that over time, it infiltrated itself into and on farm buildings, giving them a characteristic red tinge.

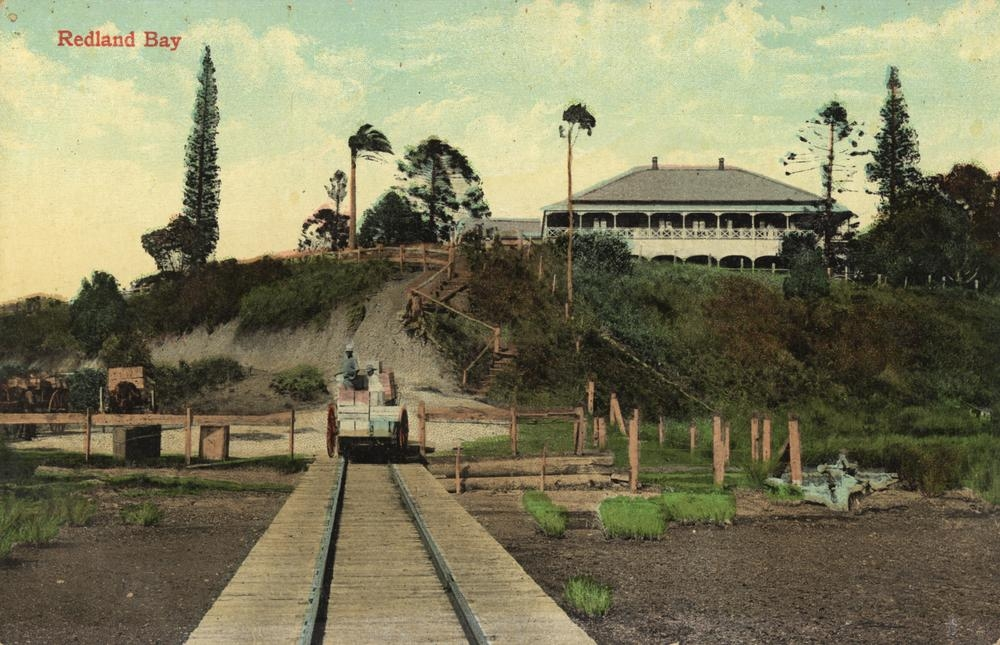
Redland bay, circa 1905

One early settler was Arnold Friedrich Muller who took up 50 acres (20 ha) of coastal forest north of what is now Point Talburpin. Muller's farmhouse was removed in the 1990s to make way for a stage of the Orchard Beach estate, but its site is still marked by a pair of mature fig trees, planted around 1905, at the top of School of Arts road where it meets Collins Street. While these trees were likely to have been planted for the practical purposes of shading the house from the intense afternoon sun and cold winter westerly winds, they also stand as a symbol of the enduring husband and wife farming partnerships that helped to define the character of Redland Bay. Arnold's eldest son William was born around 1879, the first white man to be born in the district. He died in 1978 at the age of 99.

The early farms produced sugar cane, pineapples and citrus. The produce was taken to market by horse-drawn wagon at first, then by the steamboats Pearl, Eucalypta, Louisa and Porpoise, operated by one Captain John Burke. The viability of these crops was reduced as larger farms to the north at Thorneside, Cleveland and Ormiston gained a competitive advantage over Redland Bay, possibly due to access to rail transport. Redland Bay farmers moved towards producing tomatoes, cabbage, cauliflower and passionfruit. These crops continued until farming finally gave way to suburban development around the year 2000.

Redland Bay Provisional School opened on 14 December 1881 as a half time school in conjunction with Victoria Point Provisional School (meaning a single teacher was shared between two schools). In 1890, it became Redland Bay State School.

On 10 November 1884, auctioneer John Cameron offered 451 suburban lots in the Redland Bay Estate, an area bounded by North Street to the north, Moreton Bay to the east, Boundary Street to the south and Mill Street to the west. The lots were advertised as having either a water frontage or splendid view of the bay and that there was a local sawmill able to provide timber for construction. The auctioner provided steamships to bring the buyers from Brisbane to the auction. The advertising also claimed the Cleveland railway line would be extended to Redland Bay (which never occurred). Another auction was held for this estate on 26 December 1884.

On 7 March 1885, auctioneer John Cameron offered 161 suburban lots (mostly 20 perches) bounded by Peel Street to the north, Moreton Bay to the east, Weinham Creek to the south and Scott and Hamilton Streets to the west, in addition to four banana farms (6 to 8 acres). One of the many benefits of the estate was the availability of "pure milk (no tadpoles)".

On 9 November 1885, auctioneer Arthur Martin & Co offered 780 suburban lots (mostly 16 perches) in the Torquay Estate, an area bounded by Torquay Road to the north, Moreton Bay to the east, Oakland Avenue to the south and Serpentine Creek Road to the west. As well as promising a future railway connection, the advertising also speculated "If coal is discovered, of which there is every reasonable probability, Redland is bound to become the Newcastle of Queensland, and one of the most important places in Australia".

On 22 September 1888, auctioneer R.J. Cottell offered 610 lots (mostly suburban blocks ranging from 20 to 42 perches) expanding the Redland Bay estate westward to the Moogurrapum Creek and southward to Pitt Street (with some larger farm blocks beyond those boundaries). The auction took place at the Brisbane Opera House in Queen Street.

On 18 March 1889, auctioneer A. Martin & Co offered 109 lots, including some still unsold in the original Redland Bay Estate as well as some additional lots in the vicinity of Broadwater Terrace.

An extension of the Cleveland railway line to Redland Bay and Mount Cotton was surveyed in 1889. The extension to Redland Bay was recommended by the Royal Commission into Public Works in 1922, but was never built.

In 1906, a Baptist church opened in Redland Bay. On Sunday 10 July 1932 it was reopened after extensions and improvements.

In 1979, the locality was described as:

"arguably the most unchanged and fertile land within the entire Redlands area. The suburban sprawl has managed only scant inroads to a few pockets of land, but the remaining farmers have stubbornly resisted even the juiciest of offers from land developers, preferring a continuation of their inherited lifestyle."

In the two decades that followed, the decision was made by the Redland Shire Council to permit suburban development in and around Redland Bay. With land zoning changing from rural to residential, and the corresponding steep rise in rates (local government land tax), Redland Bay's farmers found they could no longer compete with other farming areas not as close to a major metropolitan area. One by one the farms were sold to land development companies, and Redland Bay, by the year 2002 farming had all but ceased.

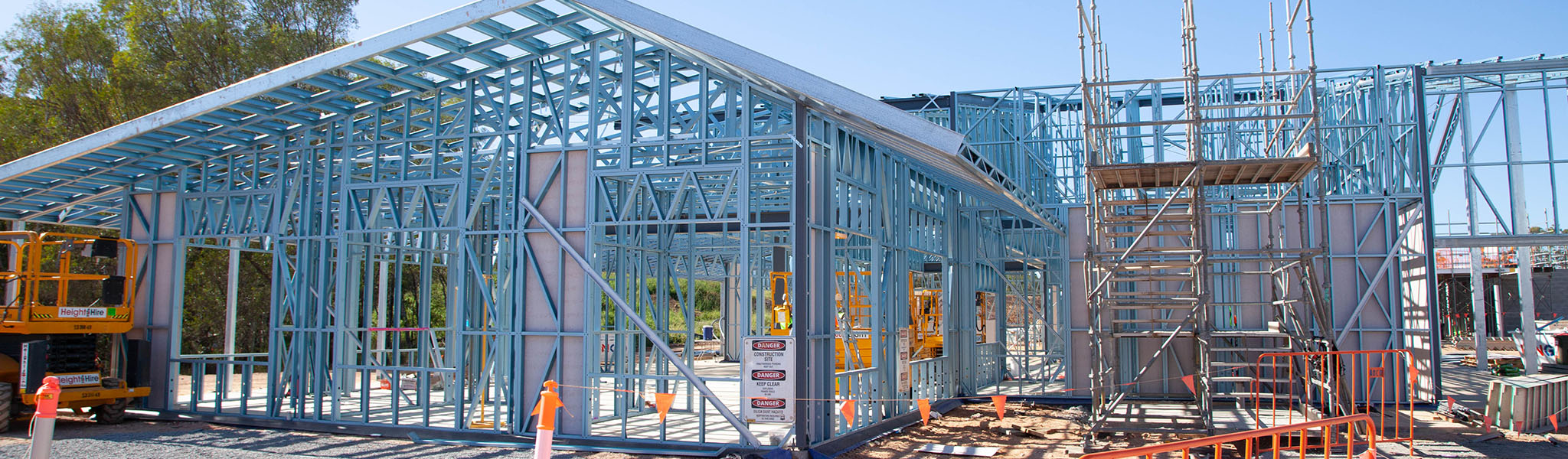
Scenic Shores State School under construction, 2023

From 2000, Redland Bay has been increasingly populated. Most farms have been replaced by housing, and has its own set of shops.

Scenic Shores State School opened on 22 January 2024 under principal Sue Hendriks.

== Demographics ==
In the 2011 census, Redland Bay recorded a population of 13,624 people, 50.3% female and 49.7% male. The median age of the Redland Bay population was 37 years, the same as the national median. 75.2% of people living in Redland Bay were born in Australia. The other top responses for country of birth were England 7.6%, New Zealand 5.2%, South Africa 1.7%, Scotland 0.9%, Germany 0.6%. 92.7% of people spoke only English at home; the next most common languages were 0.6% Afrikaans, 0.3% German, 0.2% Dutch, 0.2% Italian, 0.2% Spanish.

In the 2016 census, Redland Bay had a population of 14,958 people.

In the 2021 census, Redland Bay had a population of 17,056 people.

== Heritage listings ==
Redland Bay has a number of heritage-listed sites, including:

- Redland Bay War Memorial (including a Roll of Honour), 46–72 Banana Street in Nev Stafford Park (27.6168°S 153.3094°E)
- Orange Grove Manor, house with cropped pyramid roof, 189 School of Arts Road (corner of Collins Street, 27.6300°S 153.3076°E)
- Redland Bay State School Residence, 125–141 Gordon Road (27.6191°S 153.2929°E)
- Moreton Bay Fig trees, Moores Road (27.6226°S 153.3101°E)
- Serpentine Creek Road Cemetery, 398–408 Serpentine Creek Road (27.6693°S 153.3023°E)

== Redland Bay Flying Boat Base ==
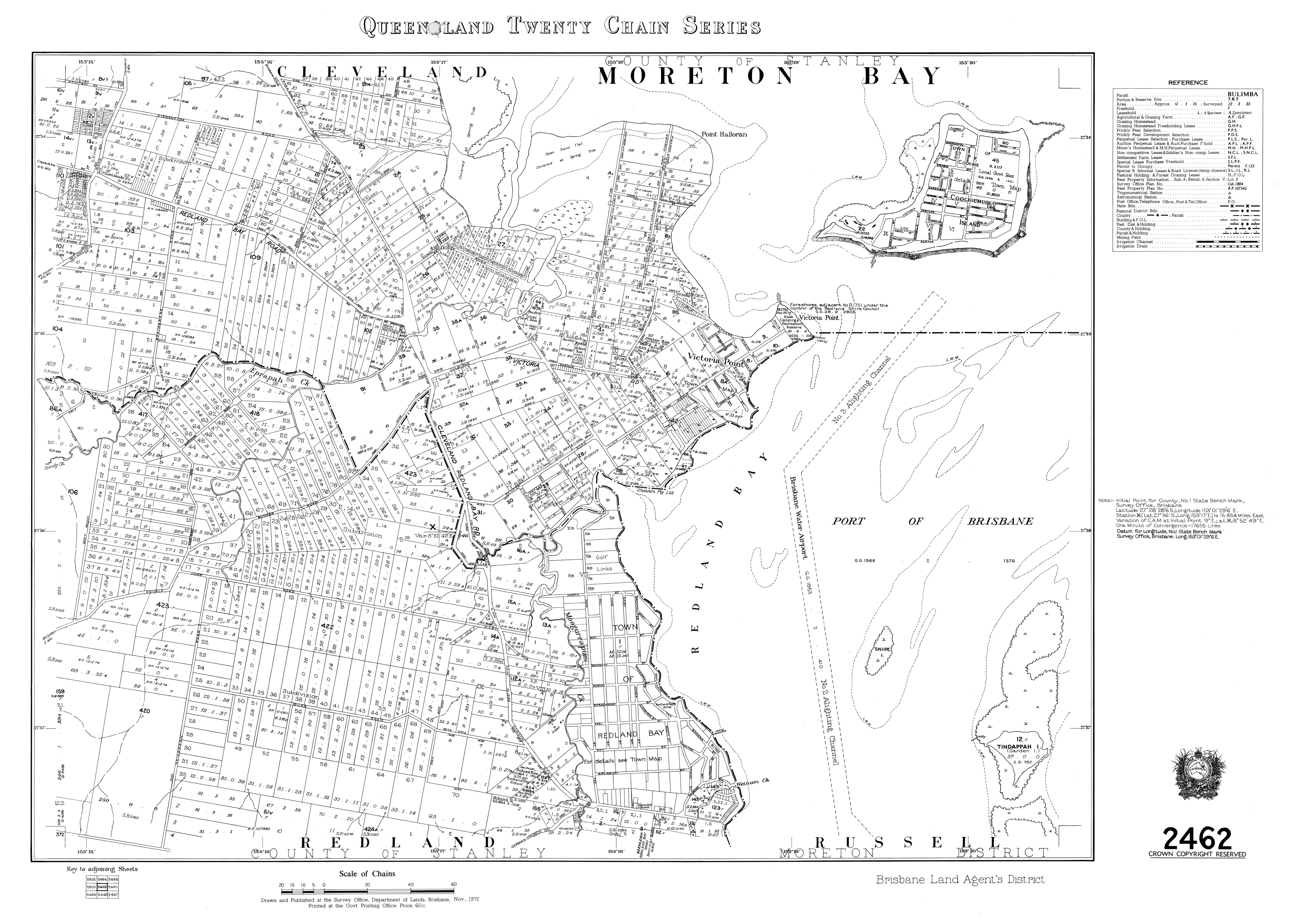
1972 map of Redland Bay showing the Brisbane Water Airport and two of its "alighting channels", also the jetty used as the terminal and the Redland Bay Hotel (the transit area)

From 1953 to 1971, Qantas Empire Flying Boats operated from Redland Bay. These were mainly Sunderland flying boats traveling from Sydney to the United Kingdom. From 1955, Ansett, formerly known as Barrier Reef Airways also operated flying boats from Redland Bay, taking tourists to Hayman Island in North Queensland.

Activity at Redland Bay reached its peak in the 1950s with 105 commercial flying boat movements in July 1953. There was a steady decline after that until After 1971, Qantas began operating the new Boeing 747 long-haul aircraft that made the Flying Boats obsolete. The base was finally closed in 1972.

The terminal for the Flying Boat Base was the jetty at Banana Street, Redland Bay, near the present location of the Bay Island ferry service. Flying boat passengers waiting to embark, and those in transit could wait and be refreshed at the Redland Bay Hotel while the Flying Boats were serviced for the onward journey.

== Education ==
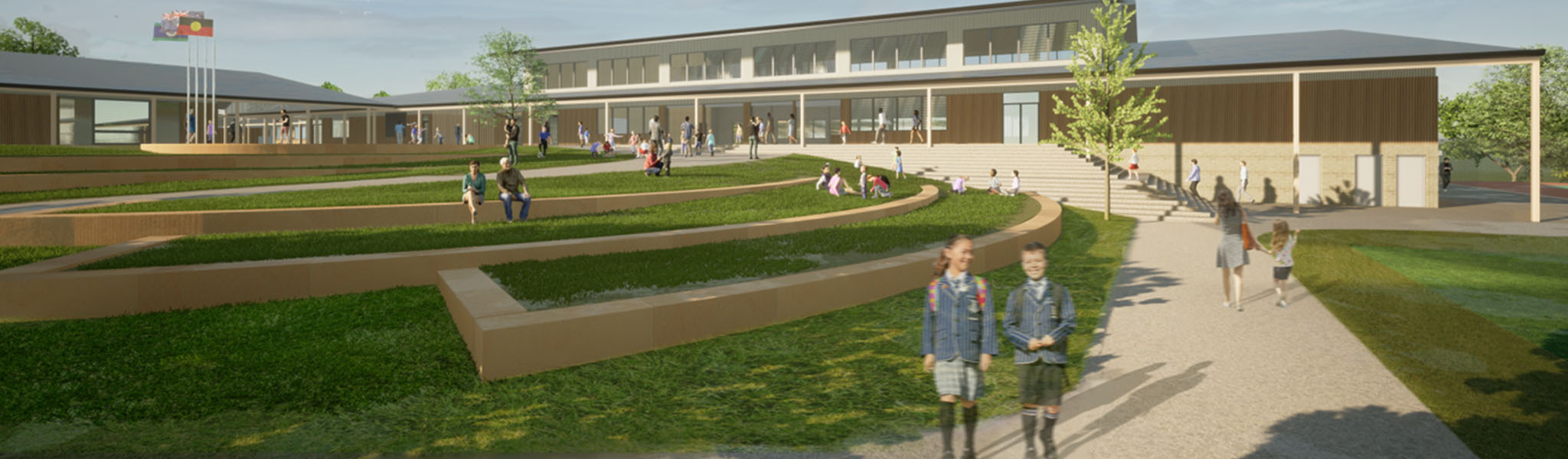
Artist's impression of Scenic Shores State School, 2023

Redland Bay State School is a government primary (Prep–6) school for boys and girls at 125–141 Gordon Road (27.6185°S 153.2930°E). In 2017, the school had an enrolment of 876 students with 65 teachers (56 full-time equivalent) and 42 non-teaching staff (27 full-time equivalent). It includes a special education program.

Scenic Shores State School is a government primary (Prep–6) school for boys and girls at 350-372 Serpentine Creek Road (27.6660°S 153.3038°E).

There are no secondary schools in Redland Bay. The nearest government secondary school is Victoria Point State High School in neighbouring Victoria Point to the north.

== Amenities ==
The Redland City Council operates a mobile library service which visits Stradbroke Street.
