= Venman Bushland National Park =

National park in Australia

- IUCN category II (national park)
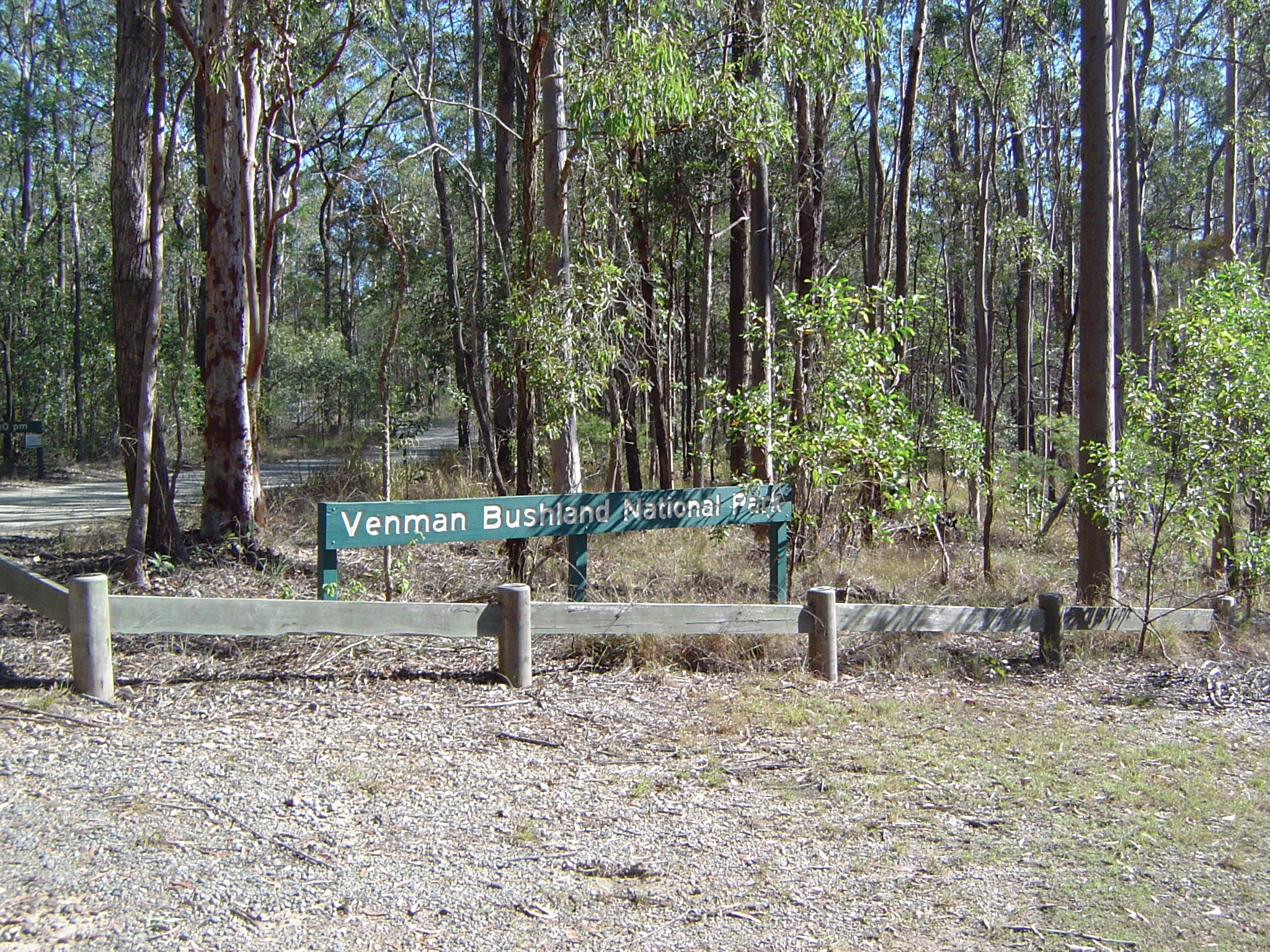
- Entrance sign, 2014

- Location within Queensland
- Location: Queensland
- Coordinates: 27°37′39″S 153°12′01″E
- Area: 4.15 km^{2} (1.60 sq mi)
- Established: 1995
- Governing body: Queensland Parks and Wildlife Service
- Website: Official website

Venman Bushland is a national park in Queensland, Australia, 22 kilometres (14 mi) southeast of Brisbane.

== History ==
Jack Venman purchased 255 acres of land on West Mount Cotton Road in the Shire of Redland in 1954. The land had been heavily logged in the 1900s. Venman paid 2 pounds per acre which was a total of 510 pounds. His early plans for the land were cattle farming but he did not have money to sustain cattle. In 1959, Venman sought work elsewhere and it was noted that the land was returning to its natural state.

In the late 1960s Jack discovered surveyors on the property who wanted to develop the land. He turned them down but became concerned for the preservation of the land as bushland. He constructed walking tracks, barbecues and built wooden chairs and tables. In the 1970, he deeded the land to Shire of Albert for $1 and the right to maintain his home on the land. At the age of 73, Venman retired as caretaker for the property.

== See also ==
- Protected areas of Queensland
