= Mount Petrie =

Mountain in Queensland, Australia

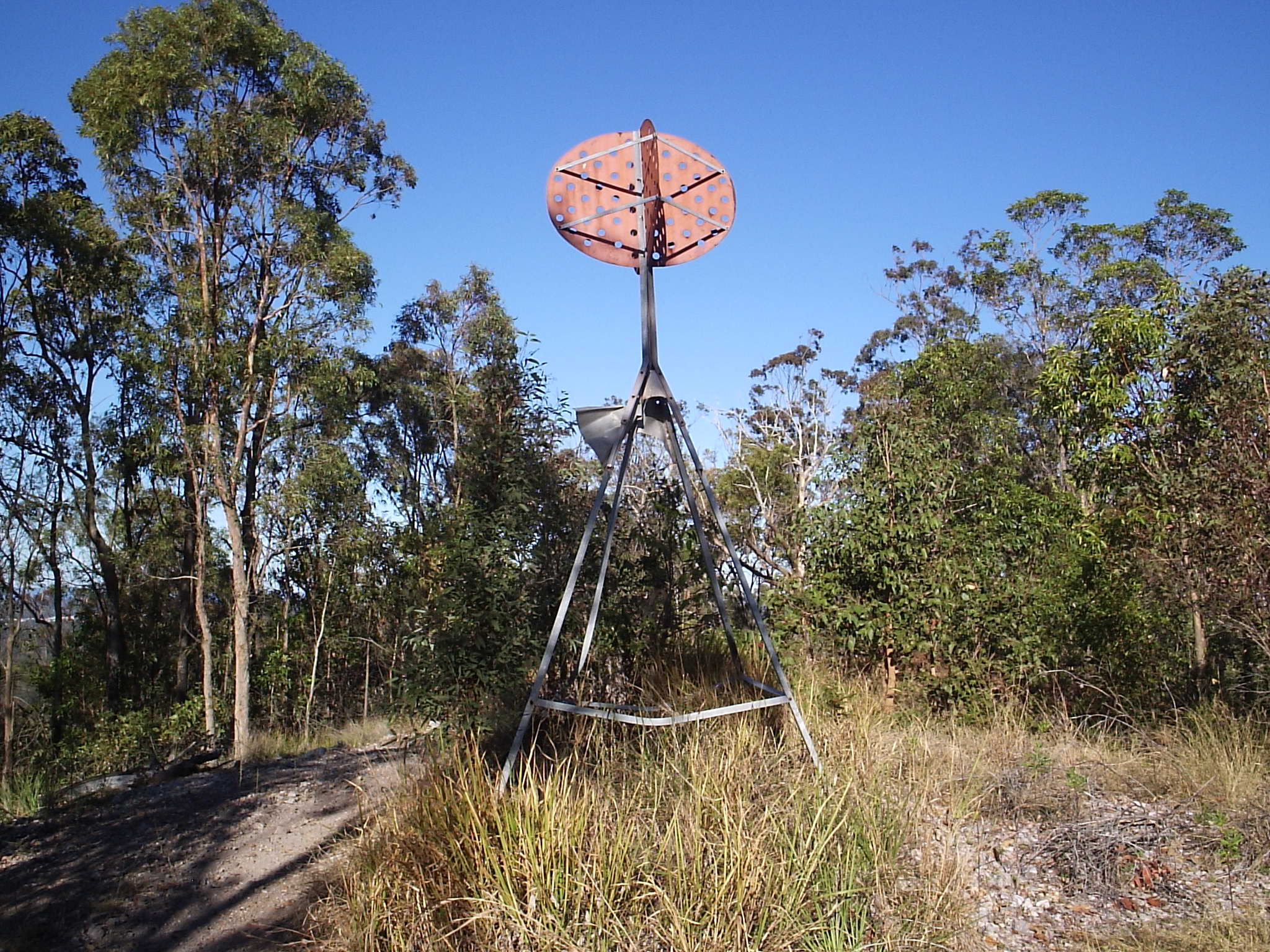
- The top of Mount Petrie

Highest point
- Elevation: 170 m (560 ft)
- Listing: List of mountains in Australia
- Coordinates: 27°32′S 153°08′E

Geography
- Location within Queensland
- Location: Brisbane, Australia

Climbing
- First ascent: Andrew Petrie

Mount Petrie is a mountain in the south east of the city of Brisbane, Queensland, Australia. The 170-metre (560 ft) rise is sometimes referred to as Petrie Hill. It includes semi-rural residential parts of the suburbs of Mackenzie and Burbank.

The mountain was named after Andrew Petrie Superintendent of Works, Moreton Bay Colony, who climbed it in 1838 to get his bearings when lost in the bush in the company of Major Cotton, the Commandant of Moreton Bay Colony. It is believed that this was the first climbing of this mountain by white men.

The southern summit of the mountain has an abandoned triangulation station with a collapsed radio tower, while the top of the mountain has a trig tower for taking bearings and measurements. The top of the mountain offers views of Brisbane and Moreton Bay.

For many years the undeveloped bushland around this hilly area was empty, except for the occasional dirt track. This was partly due to the proximity to the Belmont Rifle Range, around which access is restricted for safety reasons. The bushlands near Mount Petrie are an important habitat for koala, wallaby, and echidna colonies.

A few kilometres east of Mount Petrie is the Leslie Harrison Dam. This places the large hill in the catchment area for Redland City, another reason that development has been curtailed in this part of the city.

The construction of permanent facilities for the Western Corridor Recycled Water Project in 2008 had a significant impact on the bushland on the mountain.

The other two tallest mountains in Brisbane are Mount Coot-tha and Mount Gravatt. The Gateway Motorway passes a few kilometres to the west of the mountain.

== 1942 DH-86 aircraft crash ==
On 20 February 1942, a Qantas de Havilland 86 passenger aircraft, VH-USE "Sydney", crashed into the base of Mount Petrie, killing all nine people on board.

== See also ==
- Mount Cotton
