= Tingalpa Creek =

Coordinates: 27°29′S 153°12′E

Tingalpa Tunim Creek, Tangulba Creek
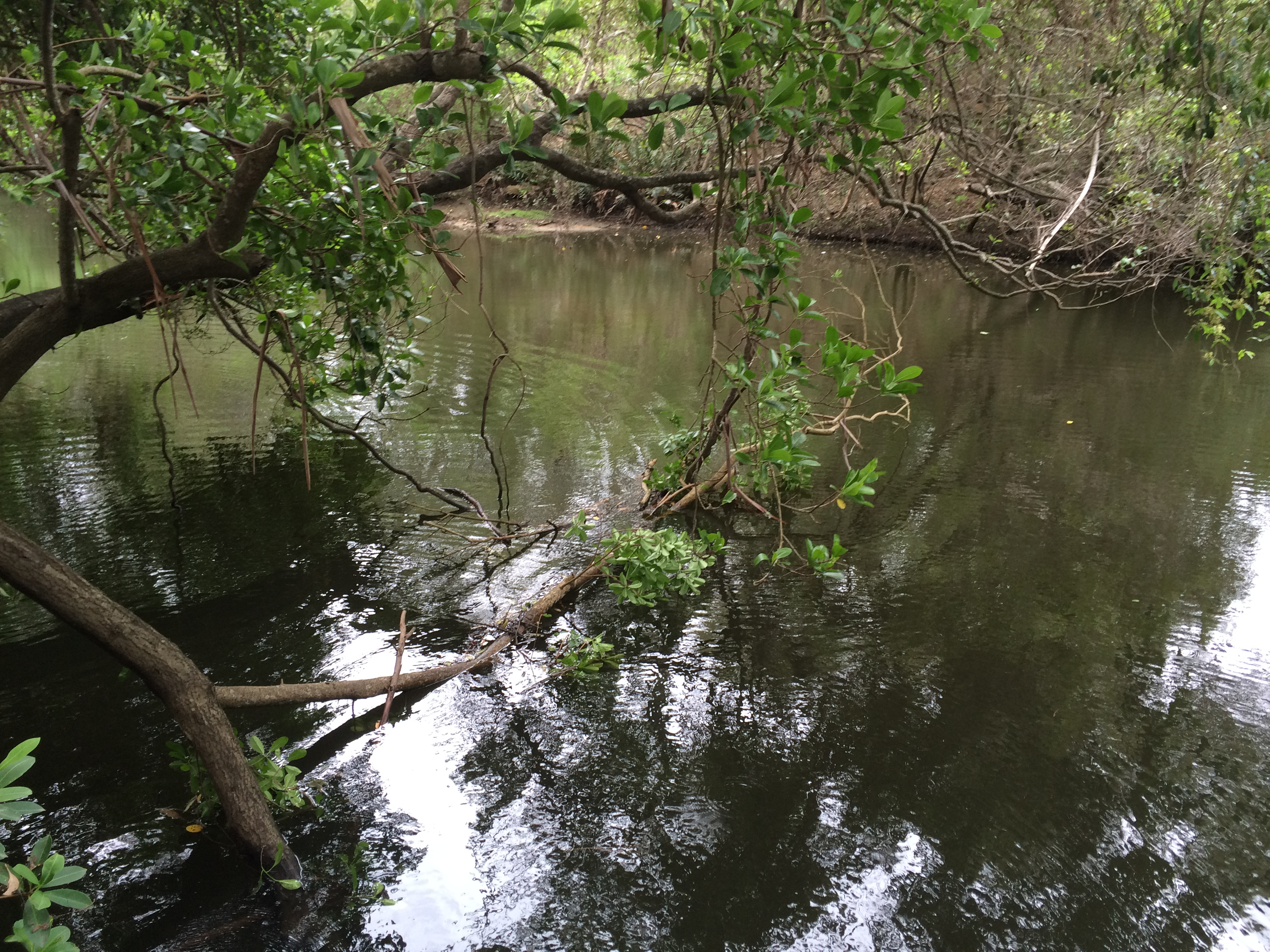
- Tingalpa Creek viewed from Capalaba, near Old Cleveland Rd, 2016

Location
- Country: Australia
- State: Queensland
- Region: South East Queensland
- City: Brisbane

Physical characteristics
- Source confluence
  - location: Mount Cotton
- Mouth: Moreton Bay
  - location: Thorneside
- Basin size: 150 km^{2} (58 sq mi)

Basin features
- Tributaries
  - left: Priest Gully

Tingalpa Creek is a creek in South East Queensland. It flows along Brisbane's south east boundary with Redland City Council. On early maps the creek was called both Tunim Creek and Tangulba Creek.

The waterway serves as important wildlife corridor on the city's fringe. The creek also provides limited kayaking and fishing opportunities. The creek's water catchment area covers 150 km².

Tingalpa Creek has its headwaters in Venman Bushland National Park at Mount Cotton and the Brisbane Koala Bushlands in Burbank. It then flows a short distance through Sheldon to the waters of the Leslie Harrison Dam.

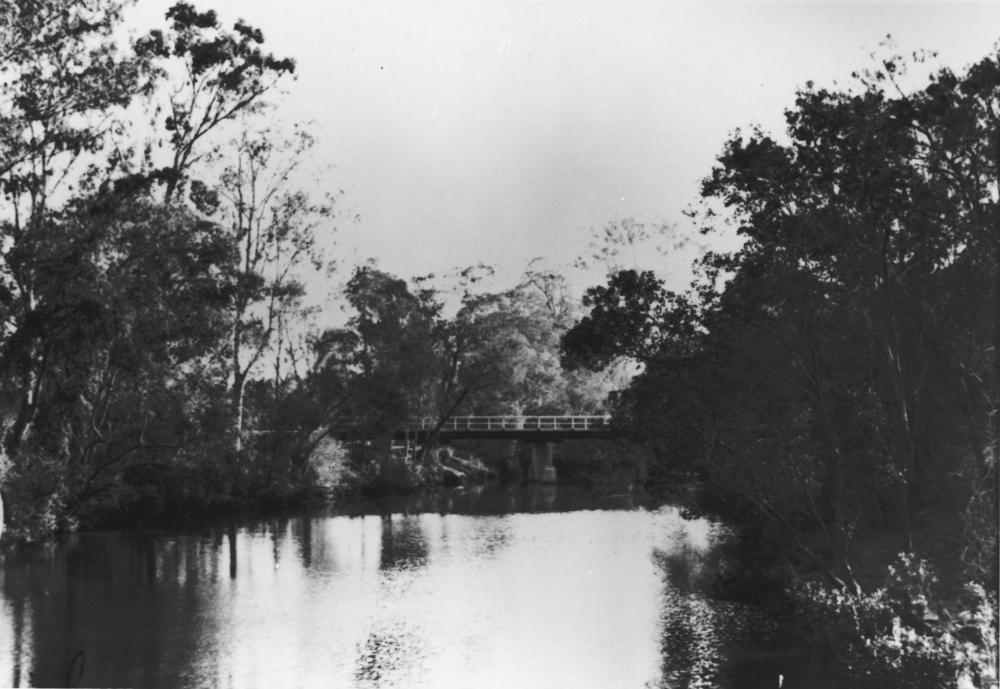
Bridge over Tingalpa Creek, 1936

The creek below the dam, now tidal, continues along its winding course through Capalaba West, Birkdale and Ransome. In this area the creek which is popular with recreational anglers, is bordered by the Capalaba Regional Park, John Fredericks Park, Sciacca Sportsfield to the east and Tingalpa Creek Reserve on its western side.

The Cleveland railway line crosses the creek before it flows to Moreton Bay at Thorneside, Queensland.

Local council have developed a Tingalpa Creek Waterway Management Plan to coordinate management practices.

== See also ==
- Bulimba Creek
