= Sheldon, Queensland =

Sheldon Redland City, Queensland
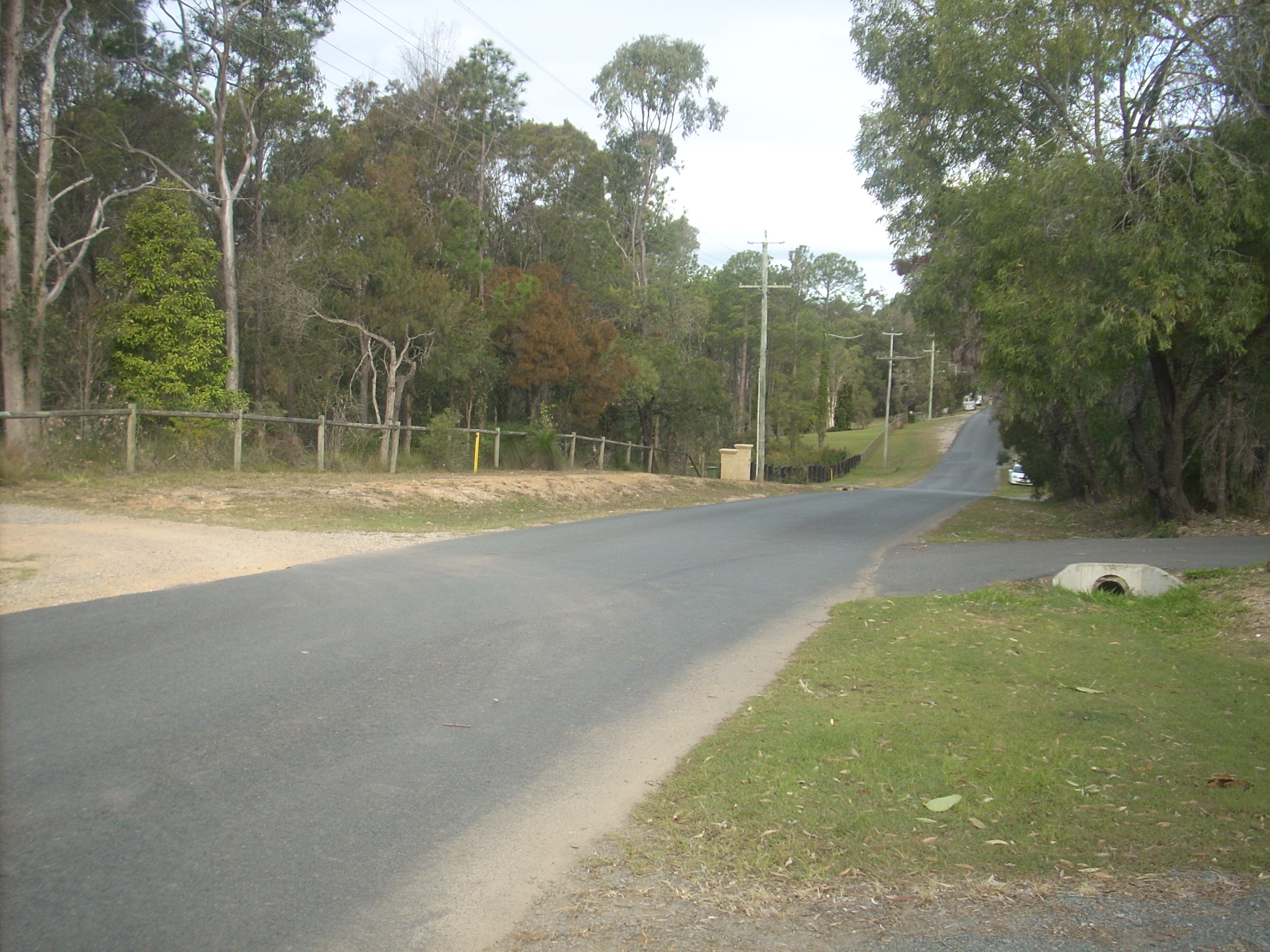
- Winston Road, 2015

- Coordinates: 27.5858°S 153.1977°E
- Population: 1,762 (2021 census)
  - Density: 77.28/km^{2} (200.2/sq mi)
- Postcode(s): 4157
- Area: 22.8 km^{2} (8.8 sq mi)
- Time zone: AEST (UTC+10:00)
- Location: 12.7 km (8 mi) SW of Cleveland; 26.5 km (16 mi) SE of Brisbane CBD
- LGA(s): Redland City
- State electorate(s): Springwood; Redlands
- Federal division(s): Bowman
Suburbs around Sheldon:
Burbank	Capalaba	Alexandra Hills
Burbank	Sheldon	Thornlands
Priestdale	Mount Cotton	Mount Cotton

Sheldon is a rural residential locality in the City of Redland, Queensland, Australia. In the 2021 census, Sheldon had a population of 1,762 people.

== Geography ==
Sheldon is 23 kilometres (14 mi) south-east of the Brisbane CBD.

The suburb is sparsely populated, consisting of mostly bushland, including some residential properties on acreage. The presence of multiple protected areas is notable, preserving the region's natural eucalyptus forests, and protecting endangered species such as the koala.

Tingalpa Creek flows through the western edge of the suburb, forming a border between the City of Brisbane. Since Tingalpa Creek's headwaters are located in the Sheldon region, the suburb is a catchment area for the entire Leslie Harrison Dam, which provides drinking water to much of the Redlands.

The region is also home to a significant koala population. As a result, the suburb retains much of its natural bushland, extending north from the Venman Bushland National Park in Mount Cotton. Nature areas of Sheldon include:

- Brisbane Koala Bushlands
- Emu Street Bushland Reserve
- Ford Road Conservation Area
- Summit Street Reserve

== History ==
Previously a largely uninhabited rural area, the suburb of Sheldon was officially named in 1980. It combined the southern and northern portions of neighbouring suburbs Capalaba and Mount Cotton, respectively. The Sheldon name likely originated from the village of the same name in Devon, United Kingdom, which itself came from an Old English word meaning "steep-sided hill and wooden valley".

Sheldon College opened in 1997 near the roundabout at which Sheldon, Capalaba, Alexandra Hills, and Thornlands meet at a quadripoint.

== Demographics ==
In the 2011 census, the population of Sheldon was 1,690, of which 49.5% were female and 50.5% were male. The median age of the Sheldon population was 42 years, 5 years above the national median of 37. 80.5% of people living in Sheldon were born in Australia. The other top responses for country of birth were England (7%), New Zealand (2.6%), South Africa (1%,) Scotland (0.8%), and India (0.5%). 94.5% of people speak English as their first language, while some residents speak German (0.6%), Spanish (0.5%), Serbian (0.4%), Italian (0.4%), and Greek (0.4%).

In the 2016 census, Sheldon had a population of 1,704 people.

In the 2021 census, Sheldon had a population of 1,762 people.

== Economy ==
Karreman Quarries are based in Sheldon, operating a quarry in the suburb, which provides material for road surfacing.

ABeeC Hives - Stingless Australian Native Bee Hives are based in Sheldon, manufacturing beehives for Tetragonula carbonaria and Tetragonula hockingsi.

== Education ==
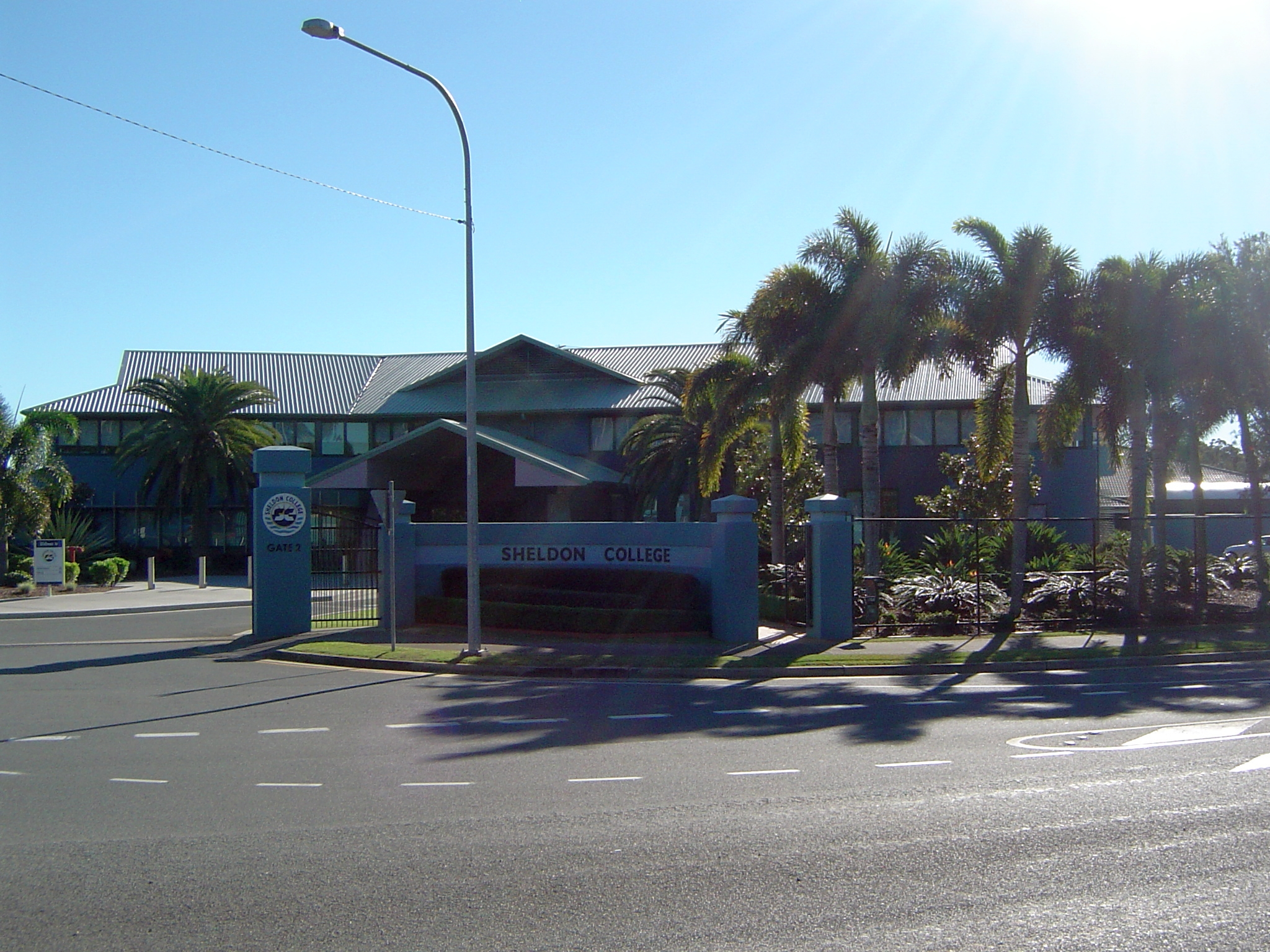
The main entrance of Sheldon College, often referred to as simply Sheldon, a private school well known in the Redlands despite being the only school in its suburb.

Sheldon College is a private primary and secondary (Prep-12) school for boys and girls at Lot 5 Taylor Road (27.5707°S 153.2345°E). In 2017, the school had an enrolment of 1,367 students with 110 teachers (99 full-time equivalent) and 85 non-teaching staff (74 full-time equivalent).

There are no government schools in Sheldon. The nearest government primary schools are:

- Capalaba State College in neighbouring Capalaba to the north
- Coolnwypin State School in neighbouring Capalaba to the north
- Hilliard State School in Alexandra Hills to the north
- Bay View State School in neighbouring Thornlands to the north-east
- Mount Cotton State School in neighbouring Mount Cotton to the south-east
- Rochedale South State School in Rochedale South to the west

The nearest government secondary schools are Capalaba State College in neighbouring Capalaba to the north, Cleveland District State High School in Cleveland to the north-east and Rochedale State High School in Rochedale to the west.
