= Capalaba West, Queensland =

Coordinates: 27.515°S 153.179°E

Capalaba West City of Brisbane, Queensland
- Population: 123 (2006 census)
- Postcode(s): 4157
- Location: 17 km (11 mi) from Brisbane CBD
- LGA(s): City of Brisbane
- State electorate(s): Chatsworth
- Federal division(s): Bonner
Suburbs around Capalaba West:
Gumdale	Ransome	Birkdale
Chandler	Capalaba West	Alexandra Hills
Burbank	Capalaba	Capalaba

Capalaba West was an outer suburb of Brisbane, Queensland, Australia, located 17 kilometres (11 mi) east of the CBD.

The Capalaba region was initially settled in 1859 when the Queensland Government offered incentives to encourage immigration.

The Department of Environment and Resource Management sought public comment on the proposal to discontinue the use of the name Capalaba West as a suburb and to include the area in the adjoining suburb of Chandler. On 30 April 2010, Capalaba West was absorbed into the suburb of Chandler.
