= Capalaba, Queensland =

Capalaba
- Suburb
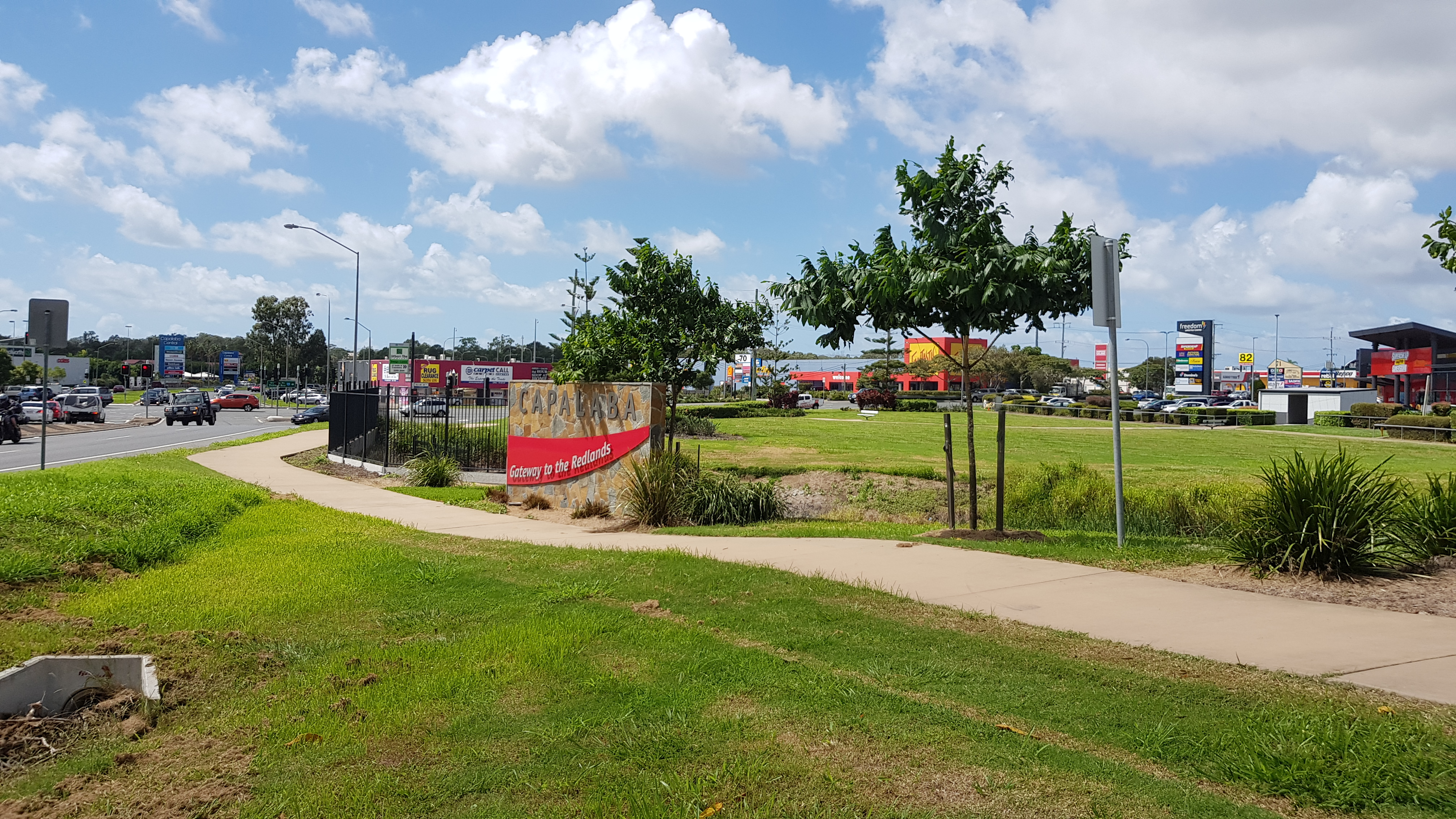
- Intersection opposite Capalaba Park, 2018

- Interactive map of Capalaba
- Coordinates: 27.5447°S 153.1972°E
- Country: Australia
- State: Queensland
- City: Redland City
- LGA: Redland City
- Location: 9.5 km (5.9 mi) W of Cleveland; 21.8 km (13.5 mi) ESE of Brisbane CBD

Government
  - State electorate: Capalaba
  - Federal division: Bowman

Area
  - Total: 18.7 km^{2} (7.2 sq mi)

Population
  - Total: 8,002 (2021 census)
  - Density: 427.9/km^{2} (1,108.3/sq mi)
- Time zone: UTC+10:00 (AEST)
- Postcode: 4157
Suburbs around Capalaba
Chandler	Birkdale	Alexandra Hills
Burbank	Capalaba	Alexandra Hills
Burbank	Sheldon	Thornlands

Capalaba (/kəˈpæləbɑː/ kə-PAL-ə-bah) is an urban locality in the City of Redland, Queensland, Australia. In the 2021 census, Capalaba had a population of 18,002 people. It is part of the Brisbane metropolitan area.

== Geography ==
The suburb has large shopping and commercial centres with two malls and a major bus station, as well as light industrial zones surrounded by bushland and residential streets, making it the second most populous suburb in the Redlands. Surrounding suburbs include Alexandra Hills, Birkdale, and Sheldon, also in Redland City, along with Burbank and Chandler (and formerly Capalaba West), which lie within Brisbane.

Tingalpa Creek marks the border between the present-day suburb Capalaba in Redland City (to the east) and the City of Brisbane (to the west), making the suburb a gateway to the coastal Redlands region for urban Brisbanites.

Leslie Harrison Dam is on Tingalpa Creek.

== History ==
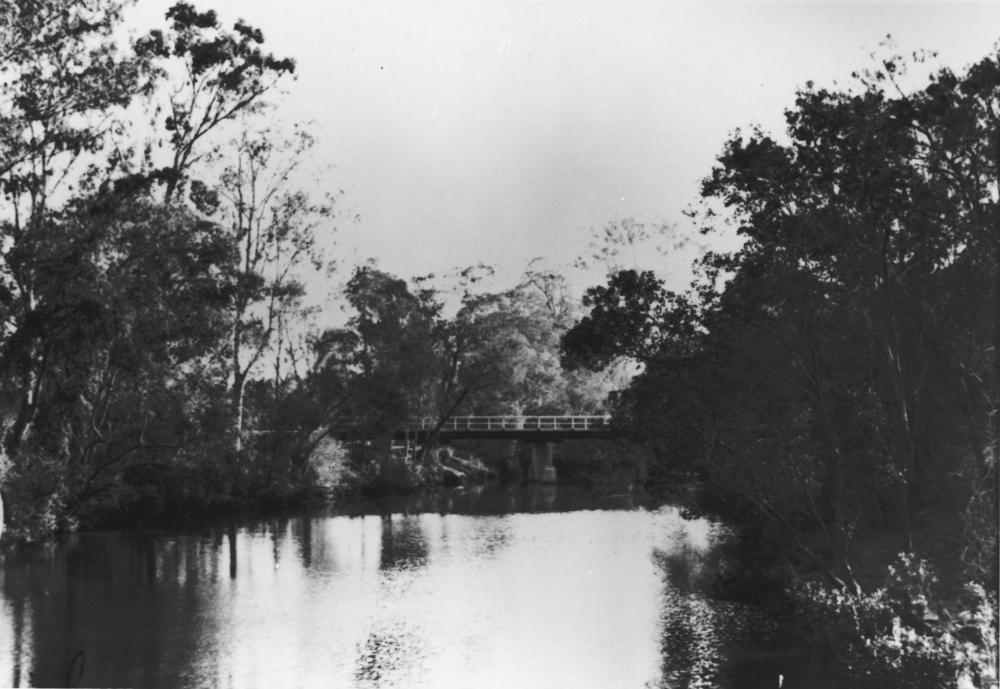
An early bridge across the Tingalpa Creek, connecting the City of Brisbane and Shire of Redland, circa 1936

The name of Capalaba is believed to be derived from the Indigenous Yugarabul word for the ringtail possum, a marsupial native to the area.

European settlement began in the 1850s, led by farmers, lumberjacks, and sawmill operators.

The town of Tingalpa (27.5174°S 153.1816°E) was surveyed in 1863 with the name of the town changed to Capalaba in 1927. The town was on the western side of the creek (now in the suburb of Chandler). The town was close to a ford of Tingalpa Creek known as The Rocks Crossing (27.5185°S 153.1882°E) which had been identified by surveyor James Warner in 1850. The ford formed part of the route from Brisbane to Cleveland until 1874 when a bridge was built over the creek along Old Cleveland Road (27.5195°S 153.1867°E).

In the early days, the community was split into three settlements known as The Rocks, the Sawmills, and Upper Tingalpa. Although a school was desired, it was difficult to agree on the settlement at which it would be established. Tingalpa Bridge Provisional School opened on 30 July 1874 in a wooden shed. This school closed and then Tingalpa Upper Provisional School opened. Believing that the number of children in the district justified the establishment of a state school, a public meeting was held on 29 March 1879 to formally apply for a state school. The application was approved but the issue of the location continued to be argued. Finally the issue was resolved with the selection of a 30-acre (12 ha) site on Mount Cotton Road, now 5A-51 School Road (27.5357°S 153.1904°E), which was equally distant (about 1.5 miles (2.4 km)) from all three settlements. On 5 July 1880 Capalaba State School (Capalaba being the informal name for the district) opened with 22 students, rising to 43 students by 1884. However, student numbers fell when the sawmills closed and the opening of the Cleveland railway line in 1889 meant Capalaba was not longer on the main route to Cleveland which further depressed the district's economy. In 1912 the teachers' residence at the school burned down. In 1922 the school was declared closed and its school building was to be relocated, but pressure from the local residents resulted in the school reopening in 1924. The population in the district increased during the Great Depression in the 1930s as people moved to Capalaba from Brisbane to find cheaper housing, enabling the school to have a sufficient enrolment to maintain the school. In 2005 it merged with adjacent Capalaba State High School to create Capalaba State College, using the combined sites.

The town was originally officially known as Tingalpa, presumably taking its name from the creek, this caused confusion due to the existence of another area of the same name and so in 1927 the town's name was officially changed to Capalaba (the name in common use).

In July 1925, local Methodists began to raise funds to build a church. By 1975 a Methodist church had been established in Ney Road.

The first drive-in movie theatre in Queensland opened at Capalaba in December 1955 at the corner of Redland Bay Road and Mount Cotton Road (27.5223°S 153.1902°E). In 1979 it was closed to make way for the construction of the Capalaba Park Shopping Centre. The drive-in was re-established in 1980 at 188-216 Redland Bay Road (behind the ten-pin bowling alley, 27.5314°S 153.2063°E). The drive-in closed in 1997.

The construction of the Leslie Harrison Dam (completed in 1968) created a major source of freshwater for the then Redland Shire in the 1960s. This led to considerable growth in residential, commercial and industrial land during the 1970s in this former rural area. Continued urban growth led to the district being split becoming two suburbs on either side of Tingalpa Creek with the suburb of Capalaba in Redland Shire (to the east of the creek) and the suburb of Capalaba West (now Chandler, 27.515°S 153.179°E) in the City of Brisbane (to the west of the creek).

Capalaba State High School opened on 24 January 1978 on a 20-acre (8.1 ha) site immediately east of the Capalaba State School at 53–59 School Road (27.5361°S 153.1960°E). In 2005 the two schools merged to create Capalaba State College, occupying the combined sites.

Capalaba Park Shopping Centre opened to the public in 1981 on the site of Queensland's first drive-in theatre. The theatre was originally relocated to a new site behind the shopping centre, but then closed entirely in 1997 following an expansion of the centre to include new cinemas. FPDSavills' Byvan division gave the centre its "Shopping Centre of the Year Award" in 2002.

Coolnwynpin State School opened on 23 January 1984.

St Luke's Catholic Parish School opened in January 1989 with 11 staff and 95 students under the leadership of Sister Lynne Albury, the school's first principal.

Capalaba Library opened in 1996.

Capalaba West was a related suburb located on the opposite side of Tingalpa Creek, and was part of the City of Brisbane rather than the Redlands. It retained the Capalaba West name until 2010, when it became incorporated into the Brisbane suburb of Chandler.

== Demographics ==
In the 2011 census, the population of Capalaba was 16,644.

In the 2016 census, the population of Capalaba was 17,333 of whom 50.4% were female and 49.6% were male. The median age of the Capalaba population was 37 years old, 1 year below the national median of 38 years old. 74.4% of people living in Capalaba were born in Australia. The other top responses for country of birth were New Zealand (6.6%), England (4.4%), South Africa (1.0%), the Philippines (1.0%), and India (0.9%). 87.7% of people speak English as their first language; the next most common languages were Mandarin Chinese (0.6%), Hindi, Tagalog, Italian, and Greek (all 0.5%).

In the 2021 census, Capalaba had a population of 18,002 people.

== Heritage listings ==
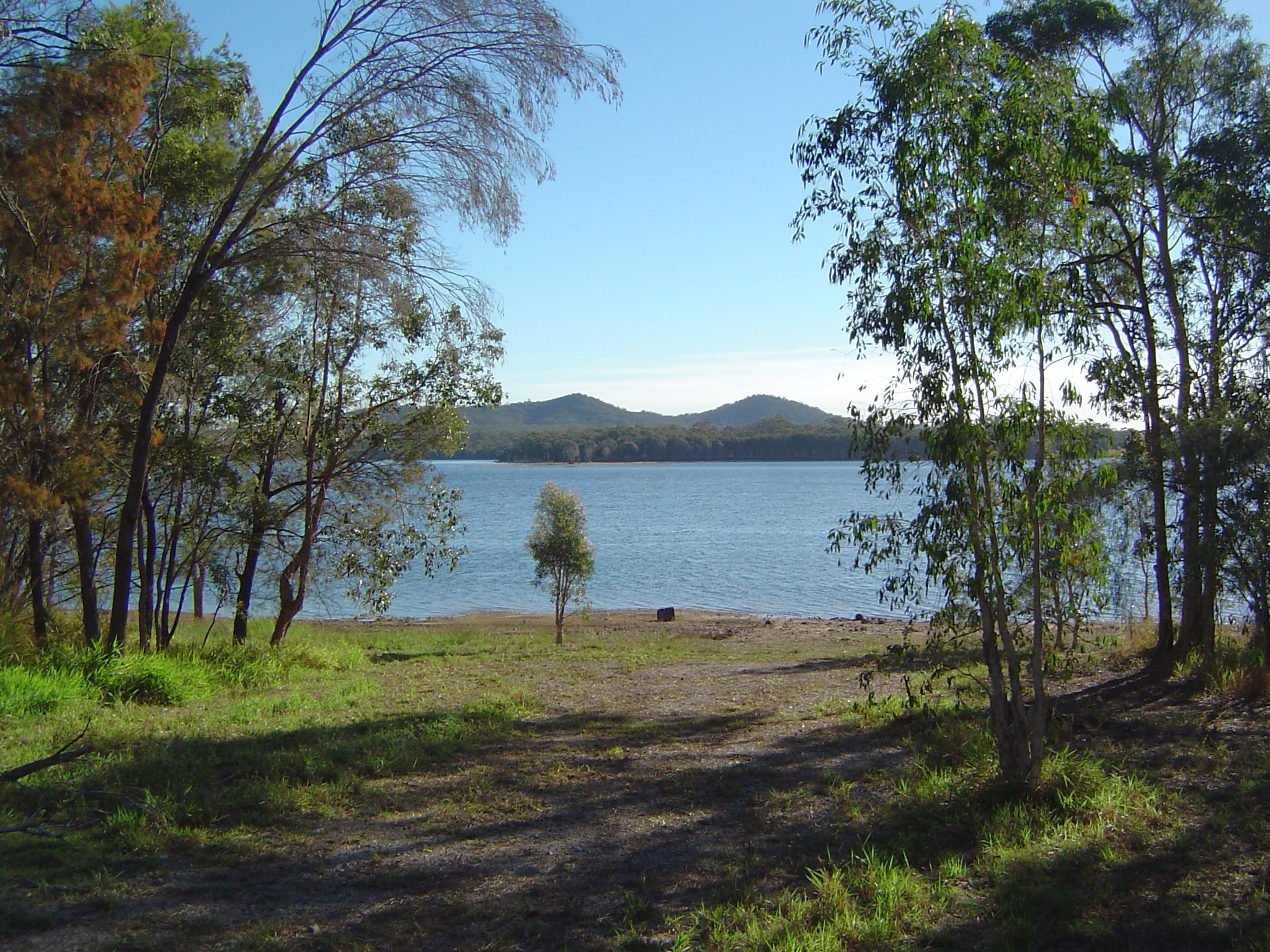
Tingalpa Reservoir, formed by Leslie Harrison Dam, viewed from a residential street of Capalaba. Mount Petrie can be seen in the background.

Capalaba has the following heritage-listed sites:

- The Rocks Crossing, a ford across Tingalpa Creek, off Old Cleveland Road
- US Army Radio Receiving Station, Capalaba, 362–388 Old Cleveland Road East, now in Birkdale (27.5095°S 153.2031°E)
- Tallowwood Tree (over 400 years old), 17 Runnymede Road on the Indigiscapes' Tallowood View Trail

== Education ==
Coolnwynpin State School is a government primary (Prep–6) school for boys and girls at 6 Telaska Court (27.5462°S 153.2042°E). In 2018, the school had an enrolment of 427 students with 34 teachers (31 full-time equivalent) and 27 non-teaching staff (19 full-time equivalent). It includes a special education program.

St Luke's Catholic Parish School is a Catholic primary (Prep–6) school for boys and girls at 45 Degen Road (27.5493°S 153.1960°E). In 2018, the school had an enrolment of 333 students with 25 teachers (20 full-time equivalent) and 14 non-teaching staff (9 full-time equivalent).

Capalaba State College is a government primary and secondary (Early Childhood to Year 12) school for boys and girls at School Road (27.5364°S 153.1898°E). In 2018, the school had an enrolment of 783 students with 77 teachers (71 full-time equivalent) and 45 non-teaching staff (33 full-time equivalent). It includes a special education program.

Turning Point Positive Learning Centre is a specific-purpose primary and secondary (5–10) school at School Road (27.5364°S 153.1898°E). It is a school for children who require support beyond that of a conventional classroom with a goal of either returning the child to a conventional classroom or undertaking vocational training.

== Amenities ==
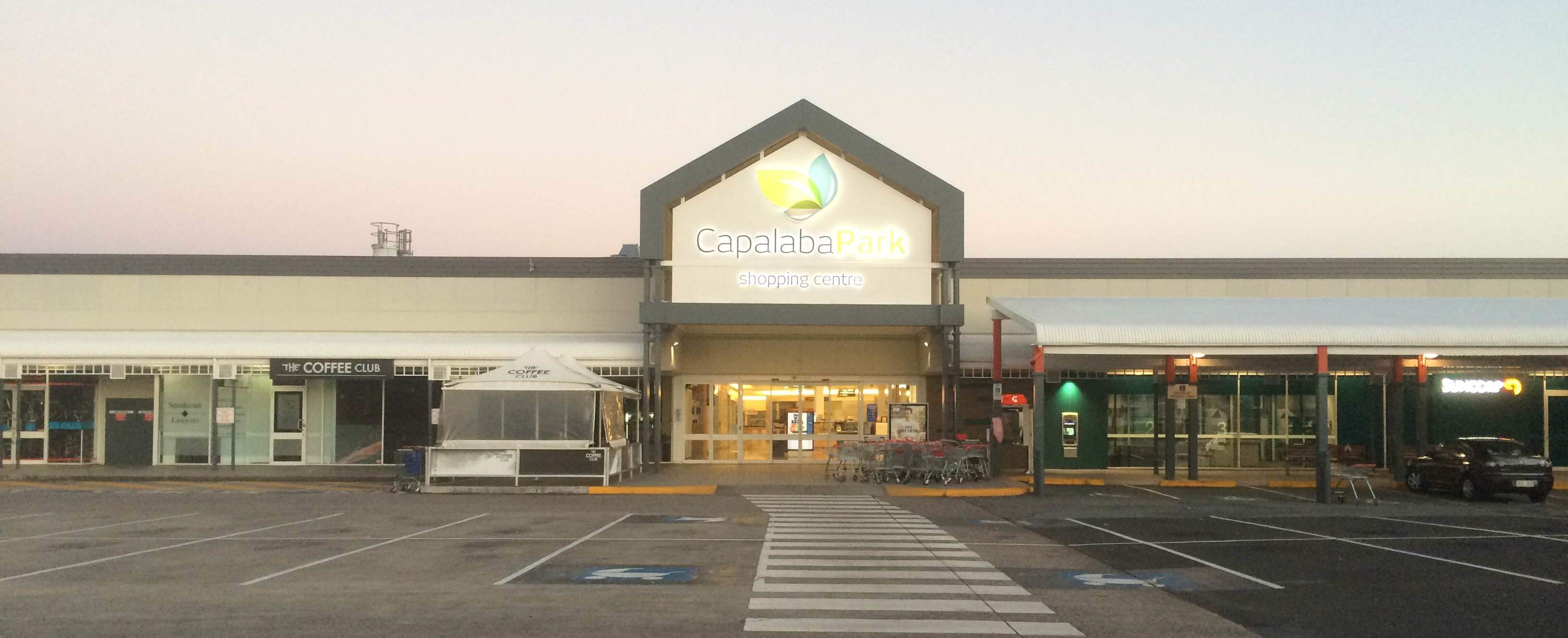
Capalaba Park Shopping Centre Main Entrance

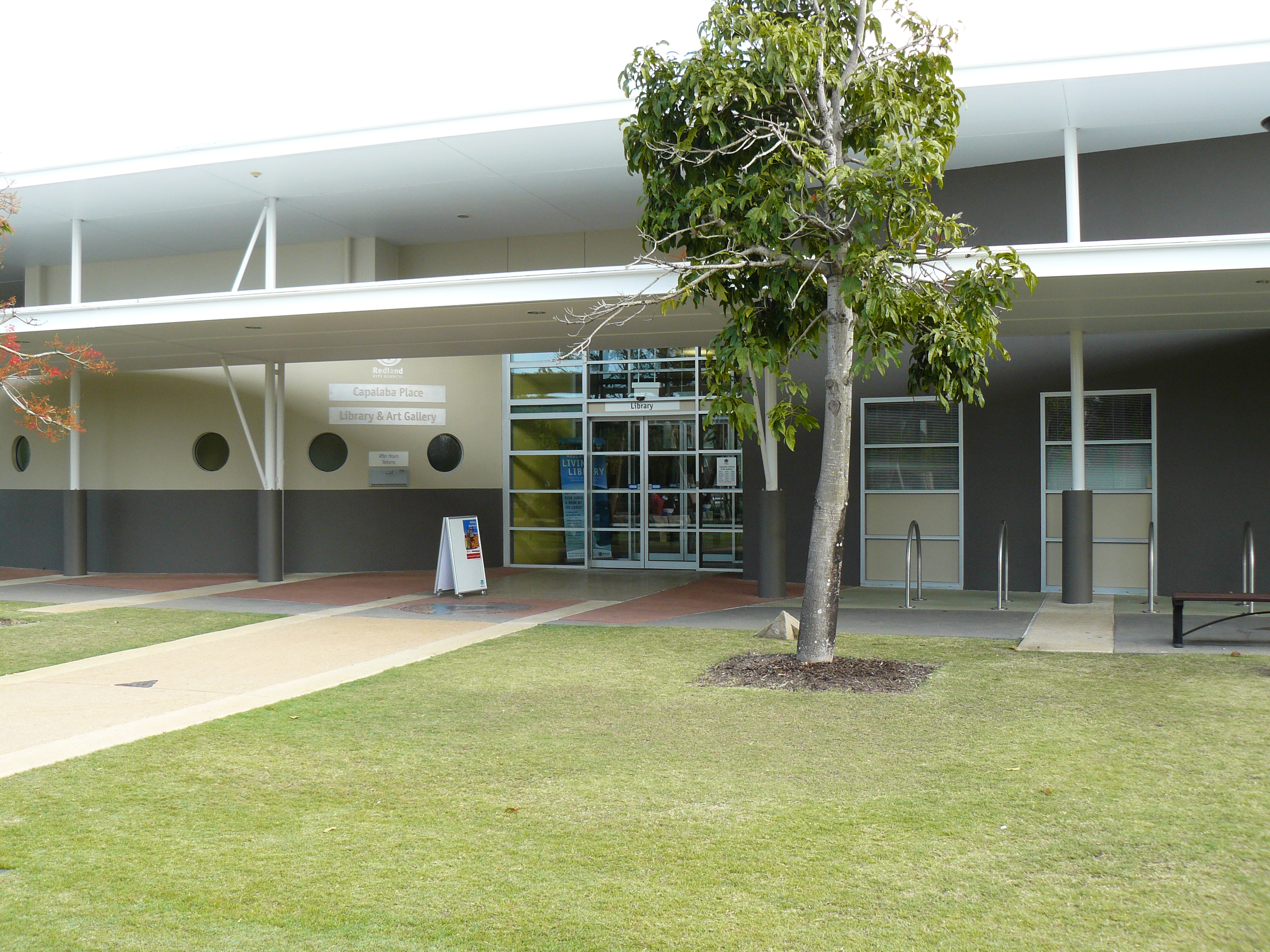
The entrance to the Capalaba Library, located between the Capalaba Park and Capalaba Central shopping centres, adjacent to the Capalaba bus station

Capalaba Park Shopping Centre is bounded by Redland Bay Road, Moreton Bay Road, and Mount Cotton Road (27.5243°S 153.1911°E).

Capalaba Central Shopping Centre is at 38–62 Moreton Bay Road (27.5234°S 153.1946°E). It includes an Event Cinemas movie theatre complex.

Redland City Council operates the Capalaba Library at 14 Noleen Street (27.5230°S 153.1929°E). There is an adjacent council service centre.

Redlands IndigiScapes Centre is an environmental education centre at 17 Runnymede Road (27.5474°S 153.2189°E).

Capalaba Uniting Church is at 30 Ney Road (27.5374°S 153.2013°E).

There are a number of parks in the locality, including:

- Bowen Street Park (27.5201°S 153.2044°E)
- Capalaba Regional Park (27.5218°S 153.1870°E)
- Chatsworth Circuit Park (27.5437°S 153.1894°E)
- Coolnwynpin Nature Refuge (27.5499°S 153.2068°E)
- Coolnwypin Nature Refuge (27.5608°S 153.2038°E)
- Crotona Road Park (27.5297°S 153.2061°E)
- Firtree Street Park (27.5604°S 153.2136°E)
- Handsworth Street Park (27.5400°S 153.1951°E)
- Holland Crescent Park (27.5305°S 153.1928°E)
- John Fredericks Park (27.5191°S 153.1884°E)
- Kilarney Crescent Park (27.5290°S 153.1857°E)
- Mahogany Street Park (27.5664°S 153.2195°E)
- Maridale Park (27.5399°S 153.2059°E)
- Mount Cotton Road Park (27.5477°S 153.1951°E)
- Parkwood Drive Park (27.5655°S 153.2268°E)
- Redlands Indigiscape Cent (27.5486°S 153.2178°E)
- Sainsbury Park (27.5634°S 153.2315°E)
- Sam Sciacca Sportsfield (27.5169°S 153.1990°E)
- Valantine Park (27.5159°S 153.2107°E)

== Events ==
The College Markets (formerly Chandler Markets) are held in School Road every Sunday morning.

== Transport ==
The Capalaba bus station connects the suburb to much of the Redlands and Eastern Brisbane. Services to Garden City bus station and the adjacent Upper Mount Gravatt busway station are operated by Mt Gravatt Bus Service, on behalf of Translink. The suburb is also connected west to Carindale bus station and the Brisbane central business district, north to the Cleveland railway line, and east to Victoria Point bus station, through bus routes operated by Transdev Queensland on behalf of Translink.

Translink's Eastern Busway is planned to extend from UQ Lakes to Capalaba, but currently only reaches Langlands Park busway station in Coorparoo.

Capalaba is also the terminus for major roads crossing Tingalpa Creek from the City of Brisbane, including Old Cleveland Road and Mount Gravatt–Capalaba Road/Mount Cotton Road, both connecting directly to the Gateway Motorway.

== Sporting clubs ==
- Capalaba Sports Club
- Capalaba District Junior Rugby League Football Club (aka the Capalaba Warriors)
- Capalaba Football Club (formerly the Capalaba Bulldogs), who play in the National Premier Leagues Queensland
