= US Army Radio Receiving Station, Capalaba =

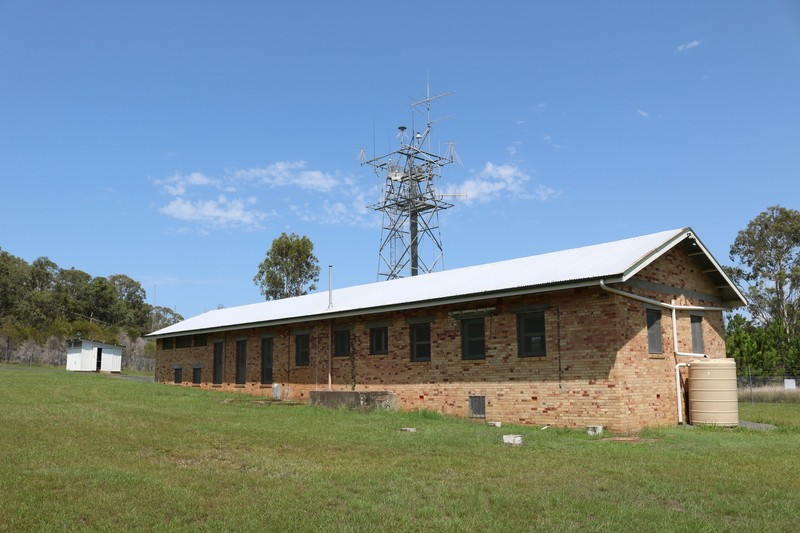
- Capalaba receiving station building from the west, 2020

- Location within Queensland
- 27.5095°S 153.2031°E
- Location: 362–388 Old Cleveland Road East, Birkdale, City of Redland, Queensland, Australia

History
- Design period: 1939–1945 (World War II)
- Built: 1942–1943

Queensland Heritage Register
- Official name: US Army Radio Receiving Station (former); Australian Communications and Media Authority (ACMA) Facility; Capalaba Receiving Station
- Type: state heritage
- Designated: 26 June 2020
- Reference no.: 650249
- Type: Defence: Signals post
- Theme: Maintaining order: Defending the country

US Army Radio Receiving Station, Capalaba is a heritage-listed former radio receiving station at 362–388 Old Cleveland Road East, in Capalaba (now within Birkdale), City of Redland, Queensland, Australia. It was built from 1942 to 1943. It is also known as the Capalaba receiving station. It was added to the Queensland Heritage Register on 26 June 2020.

== History ==
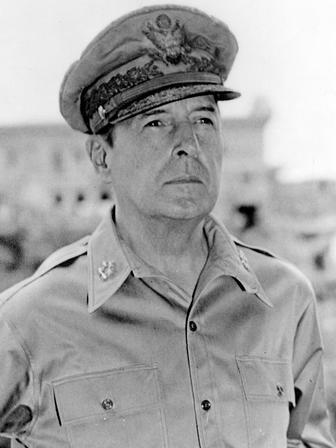
General Douglas MacArthur

The former US Army Radio Receiving Station consists of two small buildings and the location of a rhombic radio aerial array in a large, lightly-forested property is located in the suburb of Birkdale, approximately 18.5 kilometres (11.5 mi) south-east of the Brisbane CBD. Originally farmland, the site was requisitioned by the United States of America (US) Army during World War II (WWII) for the establishment of a vital radio receiving station. Constructed in early 1943 by the US Signal Corps, it became an integral part of the South West Pacific Area (SWPA) Campaign General Headquarters' communications network, under the direction of US Supreme Commander, General Douglas MacArthur. As part of the then technologically advanced global Army Command and Administration Network (ACAN), the US Army Radio Receiving Station was one of the main centres for radio communications during the South West Pacific campaign. The station worked in conjunction with the Hemmant Transmitting Station, located 9 kilometres (5.6 mi) north-west. At war's end, the Australian Post Master General's Department (PMG) took over the station. It continued to be used as a radio receiving and frequency testing facility until its closure in 2017.

Birkdale, originally part of Capalaba, is part of the traditional land of the Quandamooka people. Capalaba was one of the first places in the Moreton Bay district where country land was sold after the separation of Queensland in 1859. Although situated several miles south-east of Brisbane, it was close to Cleveland, the once-favoured port for the colony of Queensland. Due to its fertile agricultural land, it was swiftly settled. A mail service from Brisbane to Cleveland commenced in 1861 and the town of Tingalpa was surveyed on the Brisbane side of Tingalpa Creek in 1863. The land on which the receiving station was eventually established was part of James Willard's 1860s selection. This land was bounded by Tingalpa Creek on the west and by the Cleveland road on the east. Over the years, the property had several owners including Rosemary and Doug Cotton, who purchased the property in 1941.

Although WWII started in September 1939, Australia was under little threat of air attack until late 1941. On 8 December 1941, the United States of America entered the war, following the previous day's bombing of the American fleet at Pearl Harbor by Japanese carrier-borne aircraft. Simultaneously, Japanese forces launched assaults on Thailand, the Philippines and the British colony of Malaya. The sudden fall of Singapore on 15 February 1942 and the rapid Japanese advance through the islands of the Netherlands East Indies (NEI) raised fears of air attacks on Australia. The first Japanese air raid on Darwin occurred on 19 February 1942; Broome, in Western Australia, was attacked on 3 March 1942. Japanese air raids on other targets in Australia seemed likely, and an invasion of Australia was feared.

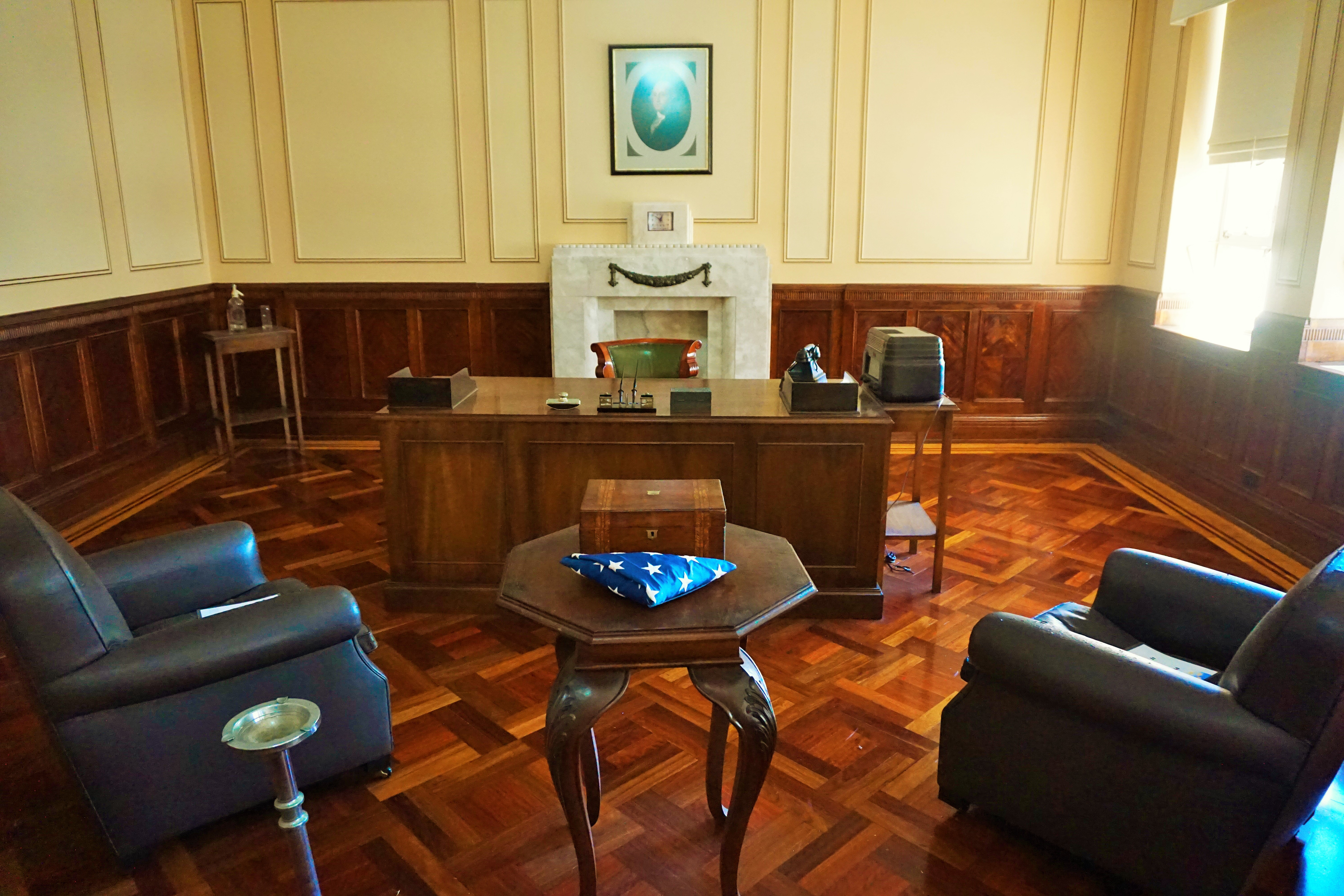
General Douglas MacArthur's GHQ Office in the AMP building (now a museum), Brisbane, 2014

After the first US forces arrived in Brisbane in the Pensacola Convoy on 22 December 1941, the city became a major supply base and staging point for the war in the South West Pacific. In January 1942, Brisbane became Base Section 3 of the US Army Forces in Australia (USAFIA). After General Douglas MacArthur, Supreme Commander, SWPA, arrived in Brisbane in July 1942, the city also hosted his General Headquarters in the AMP building at the corner of Queen and Edward streets (now part of MacArthur Central). General Sir Thomas Blamey, Commander Allied Land Forces, had his Advanced Land Headquarters at the University of Queensland at St Lucia. Queensland played a major role in the build-up of troops and supplies for the joint US-Australian counter-offensive in New Guinea, which occurred after the Japanese advance was checked at Milne Bay and on the Kokoda track (August–September 1942).

Prior to the United States' entry in the war, the Signal Corps had been developing a technologically advanced global signal beltline to enable secure communications to be sent to bases throughout the world quickly and reliably. The Army Command and Administrative Network, ACAN, was developed in Washington DC by the Signal Corps Army Communications Service. Previously, the main means of signal communication was by Morse code, which was slow and labour intensive. ACAN used high-speed radio signal transmission over multiple channels, which could send and receive large volumes of military messages to stations established throughout the world. At the centre of ACAN was the Message Centre in Washington, station WAR. With the US entry in the war, work on the global network of stations was swiftly undertaken by the Signal Corps. By mid-1943 major ACAN stations had been established in San Francisco, London, Algiers, Accra, Cairo, Asmara, New Delhi, Hawaii, and Brisbane. Linked to this network were smaller stations radiating radio or wire communications to every outlying command post. Major ACAN stations could make contact with remote areas of the conflict quickly, securely and reliably. At the time, ACAN was hailed "the greatest unified military communications system ever developed", and only the US Army had it.

Central to ACAN was the use of semi-automatic radioteletype machines. These machines revolutionised signal communications. By using high-powered, single-sideband transmitters (another innovation), messages could be sent and received between ACAN stations. The message was typed on a keyboard that produced a print out of the message while a tape was perforated with the cryptic message, fed into an enciphering machine and on to the radio transmitter. The message was then sent via powerful radio waves to the receiving point, where a second teletype machine automatically enciphered the message onto perforated tape. The last step of the process automatically printed the message on a sheet of paper. The system was capable of sending one message to multiple ACAN stations, as well as being able to send multiple messages out simultaneously on the one channel. It was fast, reliable and most importantly, secure. This technology also enabled teletypewriter conferences between major command centres. With the use of a projection screen, the typed incoming message could be displayed to a group within a room, who could then respond immediately. In 1944, a round-the-world message was recorded as taking only 3.5 minutes.

The ACAN network established major stations on an equatorial beltline, which included the United States, Australia, China, India, Africa, and the Middle East. This was deemed preferable to stations closer to the poles, where magnetic interference weakened radio waves. Following the loss of the Philippines' Manila ACAN station (WTA) in early 1942, Australia's first ACAN station was installed in Melbourne, where General Headquarters, South West Pacific was initially established. By June 1942, plans for the relocation of the ACAN station from Melbourne (Base Section 4) to Brisbane (Base Section 3), and the establishment of the Capalaba receiving station were underway. Once the US Army moved to Brisbane, the Melbourne ACAN station at Rockbank, Victoria, was handed over to the Australian Army. The receiving station building was not a brick structure as the Capalaba station was, instead it was an igloo. Soon after, the Brisbane station, WVJJ (later WTO) replaced Melbourne's station, WTJJ.

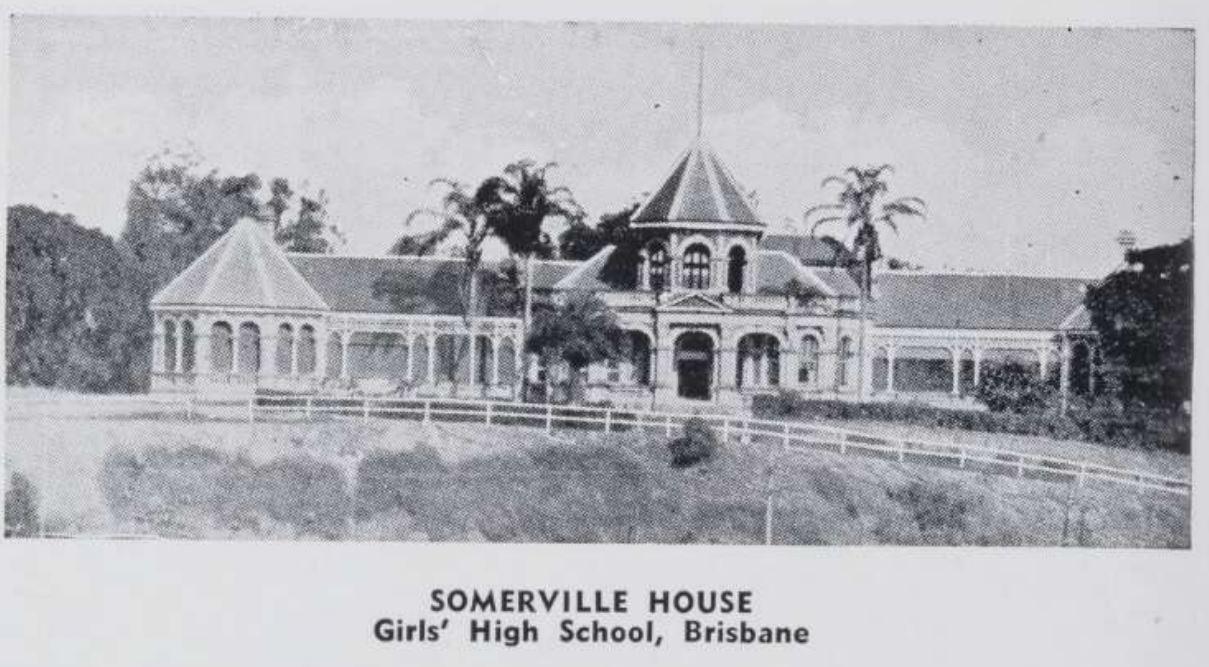
Somerville House (aka Cumbooquepa), circa 1947

Base Section 3 headquarters was swiftly established at Somerville House, a requisitioned private girls' school in South Brisbane. A central ACAN station was installed to ultimately link all communication signal lines in Brisbane, including secret military intelligence, to General MacArthur's headquarters in the city. Once all the Brisbane ACAN stations were complete, MacArthur had direct, swift and secure communication with Washington DC and other major international ACAN stations.

Conducive to clearer reception, ACAN stations were generally built on swampy ground that provided an earth mat for antennas. Ideally, the stations were constructed well away from built-up areas to limit signal interference. In the Brisbane area, several sites were requisitioned by the US Army for the ACAN network. Land at Capalaba (now Birkdale), Redland Bay, Hemmant and Rocklea was chosen. The majority of land on what was known as Willard's farm, at Capalaba, was requisitioned by the US Army in 1942 for the establishment of the Capalaba receiving station. The site was relatively isolated and swampy, with Tingalpa Creek as the western boundary.

By mid-1943, the Australian network had been completed, with the major receiving station at Capalaba, the major transmitting station at Hemmant, another transmitting station established at the Redland Bay Golf Club (the first transmitting station before the station at Hemmant was built), and another receiving and transmitting station on Oxley Creek at Rocklea. Brisbane became the "nerve centre of the Southwest Pacific ACAN system".

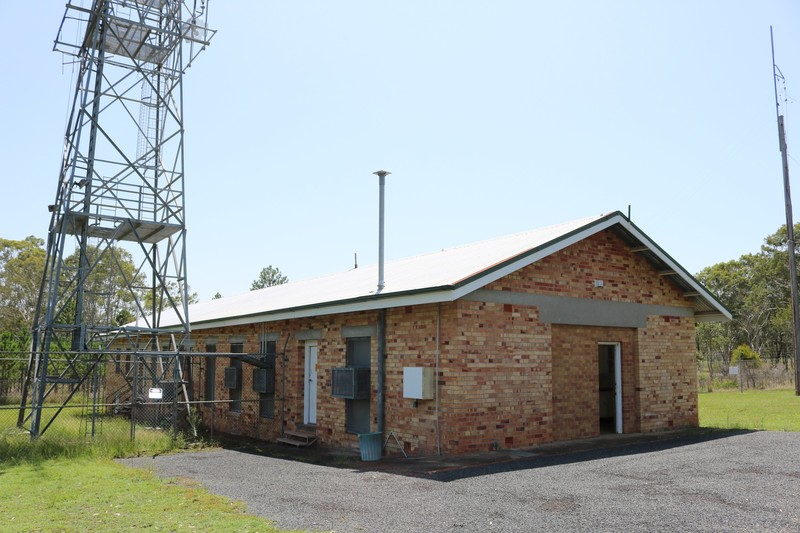
Receiving station building from the east, 2020

The brick receiving station building and generator shed at Capalaba had been completed in early 1943 with the radio equipment fully installed and operated by the US Signal Corps' 832d Signal Service Company. Some of the station's equipment, including the aerial poles, was manufactured in Australian factories. The Allied Works Council were responsible for the construction of the brick building, the generator shed, the access road and the water supply.

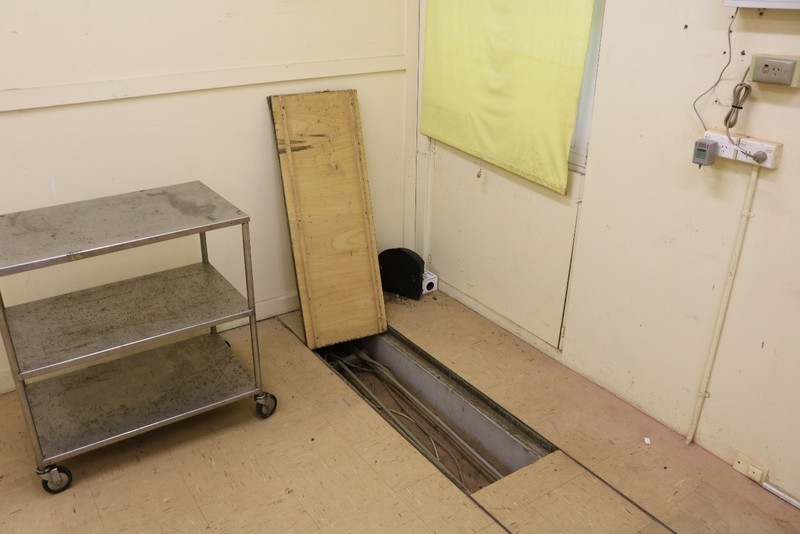
Sub-floor cabling in the equipment room, 2020

The austere brick building was designed with reinforced brick walls and concrete lintels that could withstand a bomb blast. Internally, the building was divided into two sections by a brick firewall with metal door, in anticipation of an attack. The equipment room with wide entrance door was situated at the eastern end of the building. The western part of the building held the kitchen, lavatory, bedroom and office and a further communications equipment room. Cables ran underneath the building, and in the eastern Equipment Room they ran within cable cavities in the concrete slab, accessed by a series of trapdoors. The small generator shed located to the east of the receiver station building held a Cummins diesel generator to be used if the main power supply was lost. The entrance to the facility was via a long access road from Old Cleveland Road (known asOld Cleveland Road East in 2020) where a guardhouse and gate was situated (no longer extant). The 630-metre (2,070 ft)-long access road ensured the facility was isolated and could only be accessed by authorised personnel.

Essential to the ACAN network were the powerful antennas used to transmit and receive communications. The Signal Corps used Rhombic aerials, the most effective at the time, which could send and receive radio waves over very large distances. These aerials consisted of four high poles, up to 100 feet (30 m) tall, positioned far apart in open land and connected by wires to form a diamond shape. Each one was angled toward an overseas station, for example to San Francisco (station WVY). At Capalaba, initially six Rhombic aerials were installed around the open paddocks, as well as several smaller, less powerful aerials known as double doublet aerials. As the war in the Pacific intensified and the Allied forces progressively gained ground over the Japanese, an increased number of command posts were established, each connected to the ACAN network. Improvements in radio equipment at Capalaba in early 1943 also intensified the amount of communications able to be received. It was estimated that in late 1942 Brisbane received 100,000 groups per day. By early 1943, this had risen to 250,000.

The Capalaba station was one of the most important receiving stations in the ACAN network as it was the direct line from Washington DC to SWPA headquarters, where messages were received within minutes of being sent. From Washington, messages were sent via wire cable to San Francisco and then by radio transmission across the ACAN network direct to Capalaba. The received messages were then sent to Base Section 3 headquarters and ultimately to General MacArthur's headquarters, "Commanders separated by oceans and continents could exchange questions and answers instantaneously, deciding major problems in a matter of minutes". By mid-1943, Capalaba was receiving eight command and administrative circuits from San Francisco, Hawaii, New Caledonia, Papua New Guinea and the China-Burma-India theatre (CBI).

Messages received at the Capalaba station and sent to Base Section 3 headquarters were not sent via radio waves, but by wire cable. In August 1942, at the urgent request of the US Army, the PMG constructed a direct cable line from the Capalaba station site to Base Section 3 headquarters. Further installations were also installed at the transmitting stations at Redland Bay and Hemmant for an initial cost of £12,000.

Secure telephone communications between SWPA headquarters, Washington DC and other command centres was critical. By 1943, the Signal Corps, based on technology recently invented by the Bell Telephone Laboratories in New York, had developed a ground-breaking communications system known as SIGSALY. This secret system encrypted conversations between command centres, including SWPA headquarters (where the equipment was installed in the basement of the AMP building). SIGSALY ensured complete security and pioneered digital transmission and pulse code modulation. The Capalaba receiving station played an integral role in the SIGSALY system as it received the encrypted conversations and relayed them to General Headquarters.

The US Army continued to operate the receiving station at the end of the war. The other receiving/transmitting station at Rocklea had been vacated in July 1945, followed soon after by the transmitting station at the Redland Bay Golf Course. Neither station remains. The Hemmant transmitting station was transferred to the PMG and continued to be used as a radio station until sold to private owners in the 1980s, who converted it into a house.

After the war, negotiations were undertaken by PMG to acquire the Capalaba station, which had been leased by the US Army. The PMG purchased the station building, the equipment and the aerials from the US Army.

Additionally, the PMG intended to compulsorily acquire the majority of the farmland for communications purposes. After lengthy discussions with the owners, the Cottons, the PMG acquired approximately 159 acres (64 ha), being most of Portions 46 and 41, and subdivisions 1 and 2 of Portion 42. The Cottons were compensated £2000 by the Government. By late 1946, the US Army had left the Capalaba station.

The station was then occupied by both the PMG's Engineering branch and its Wireless branch. The work carried out at the station was to monitor radio signals to ensure the clarity of both civil and emergency services' radio frequencies. This important work was carried out by the PMG until 1975 when telephone, radio and television broadcasting was taken over by Telecom. As radio technology advanced throughout these years, the equipment within the station, as well as the numerous aerials planted throughout the site, was replaced or upgraded. Within the receiving station building the original equipment room was divided into smaller spaces by partition walls.

In 2005, the site was transferred to the newly-named Australian Communications and Media Authority, ACMA, which operated the site until its closure in 2017. The majority of equipment was removed from the station at this time. The Cummins diesel generator was also removed from the generator shed. In 2019, the site was sold to the Redland City Council and, as at 2020, the buildings remain empty.

== Description ==
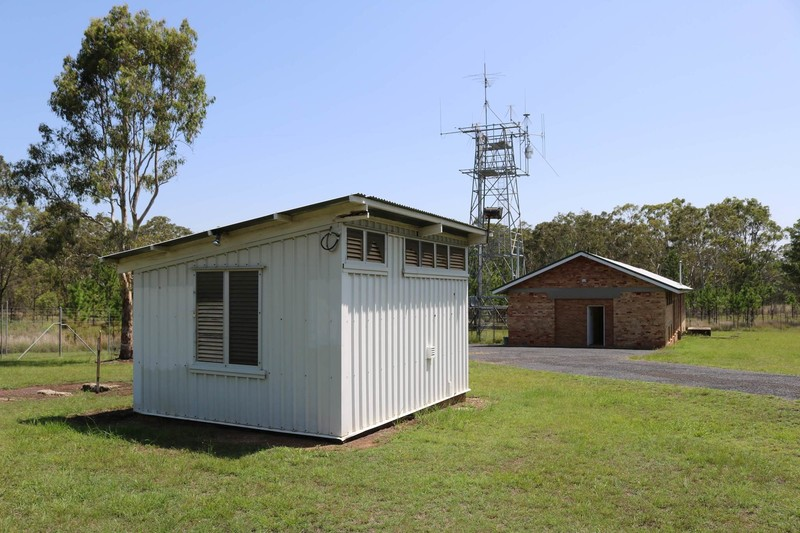
Generator shed in the foreground, with receiving station building at rear, 2020

The US Army Radio Receiving Station consists of two small buildings standing in a clearing and a radio aerial array in a large, lightly-forested area in Birkdale, 18.5 kilometres (11.5 mi) east of Brisbane CBD. Accessed via Old Cleveland Road East, the main thoroughfare of the suburb, the buildings are reached via an access road through the forest. The clearing is rectangular, approximately 4,250 square metres (1.05 acres), and the buildings stand in its centre. The radio aerial array stands approximately 120 metres (390 ft) to the northeast within the forest.

=== Receiving station building ===
The receiving station building is a one-storey, low-set face brick building with a gable roof. It is long and narrow and its long sides face north-west and south-east. On all sides are a series of openings for windows and doors with a large loading door in the north-east wall. A low-height sub-floor space with a dirt floor is accessed from the south-west end of the building.

The building includes a variety of techniques to passively boost natural ventilation of the large Equipment Room, which accommodated banks of large, heat-producing machines. While all original equipment has been removed, the original layout is intact and the original functions remain legible.

=== Generator shed ===
The generator shed is a small, square, one-storey concrete slab-on-ground outbuilding with a skillion roof. It stands to the northeast of the receiving station building and the service yard. It has large double doors facing the service yard on its south-western side and accommodates a single room formerly for a generator, which has been removed. On its south-east side are concrete pad supports that originally held a metal fuel drum to power the generator.

=== Clearing ===
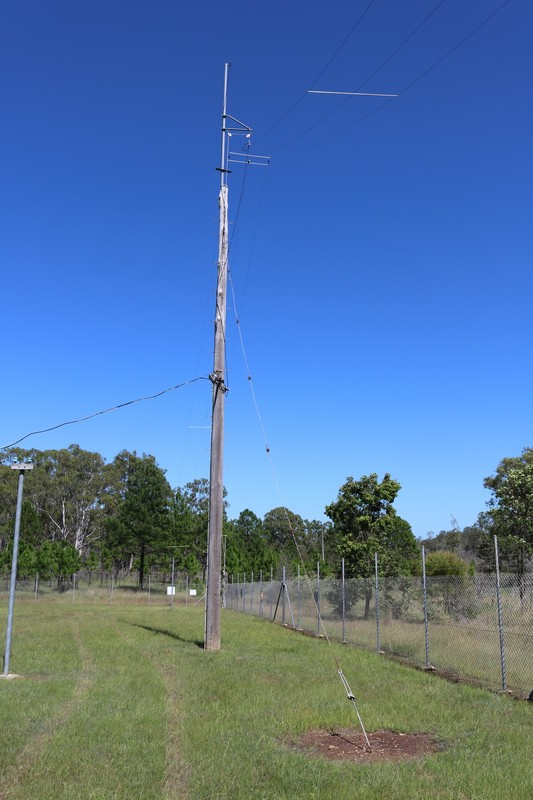
Aerial and clearing, 2020

The receiving station building and the generator shed stand in a gently sloping clearing in the forest. The access road terminates at a service yard between the two buildings. The remainder of the clearing is open and grassed.

=== Rhombic radio aerial array ===
The rhombic radio aerial array stands to the northeast of the clearing, within the forest. It comprises four tall metal masts in a stretched (kite-shaped) rhombus formation. The array is large, encompassing an area of approximately 9,000 square metres (2.2 acres) with approx. 220 metres (720 ft) from top to bottom masts and 80 metres (260 ft) from side to side masts. It is oriented with its acute points approximately north-west and south-east (top and bottom masts). Originally in the large cleared field across the whole site, the array is now surrounded by a young regrowth forest.

The masts are circular hollow section steel posts that diminish in circumference as they rise and include a ladder of steel foot pegs. They stand on concrete footings and are stayed by wire cables with concrete footings. A wire cable runs around three sides of the perimeter of the rhombus, connecting the tops of the masts (the wire on the fourth side is not extant).

A cleared straight path leads from the centre of the array through the forest to the clearing. Along it runs a line of short metal posts with concrete footings supporting a cable at their top.

=== Access Road ===
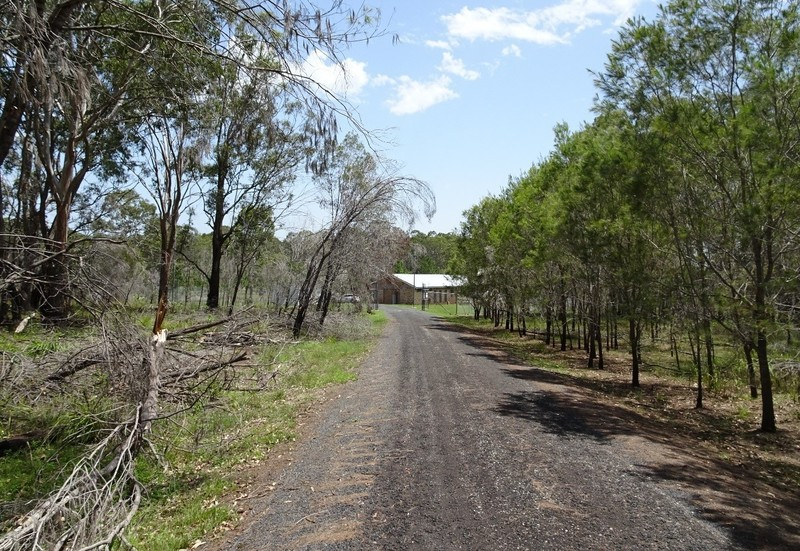
Access road, 2020

The long access road runs from Old Cleveland Road East through the light forest to the radio receiving station clearing. It is the only road access.

== Heritage listing ==
US Army Radio Receiving Station was listed on the Queensland Heritage Register on 26 June 2020 having satisfied the following criteria.

The place is important in demonstrating the evolution or pattern of Queensland's history.

Built in 1943, the former US Army Radio Receiving Station is a rare, representative surviving example of a military communications facility established as part of the United States of America (US) Army Communications Administration Network (ACAN) during World War II (WWII). It is important in demonstrating the central role Queensland played as a military communications centre during WWII. The receiving station was vital to the South West Pacific campaign as it provided fast, direct, and secure communication to General Headquarters in Brisbane, from overseas command posts.

The place demonstrates rare, uncommon or endangered aspects of Queensland's cultural heritage.

The former US Army Radio Receiving Station is rare as one of two purpose-built ACAN stations in Queensland and is the most intact and distinctive example.

The place is important in demonstrating the principal characteristics of a particular class of cultural places.

The former US Army Radio Receiving Station is an intact and rare example of a WWII ACAN radio receiving station in Queensland. Purpose-built, in its form, materials and layout it is important in demonstrating the principal characteristics of its type, including its: remote secured location with access via a guarded private road; situated away from built up areas and on swampy ground conducive to good radio reception via large rhombic radio aerial arrays; utilitarian building robustly built to withstand attack; provision of large equipment and communications rooms and domestic quarters, arranged to isolate functions; high levels of natural ventilation to primary equipment room; wide entrance doors to allow access for large radio equipment; and a generator shed for backup power.
