= Capalaba Library =

Coordinates: 27°31′22.84″S 153°11′34.08″E

Capalaba Library is one of three mainland branch libraries of the Redland City Council, Queensland, along with those at Cleveland and Victoria Point; there are other branches on the Redland City Council’s islands.

== History ==
The Capalaba Library is housed within the Council building, Capalaba Place, in Noeleen Street, Capalaba. Jackson Architecture was involved in the design, winning the Australian Institute of Architects Queensland "Civic Design" award in 1997. It was opened 20 April 1996.

In 2008 the library underwent renovations to become a modern, aesthetic environment for its clients.

== Facilities and collections ==
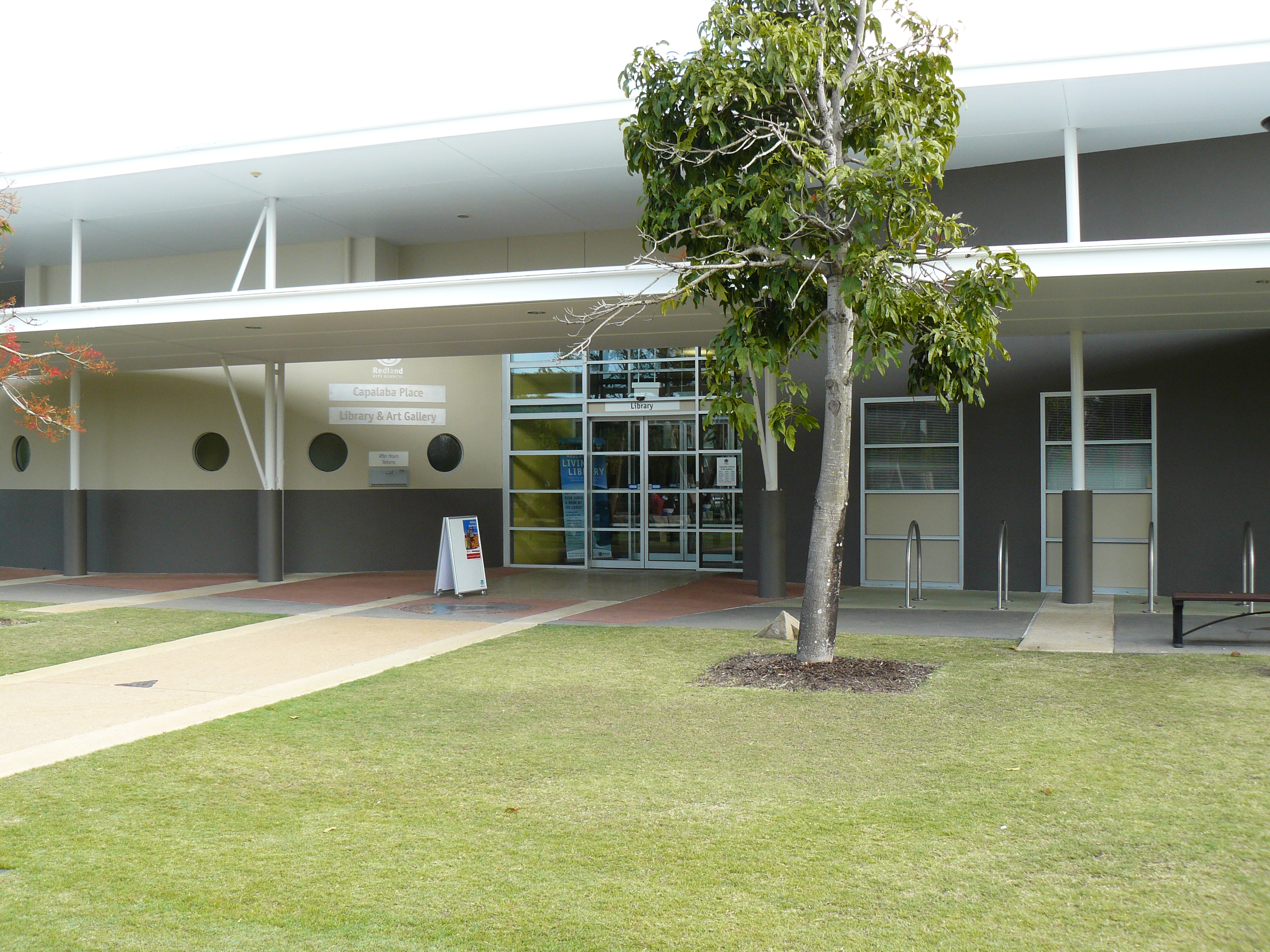
Capalaba Library entrance

The library has one meeting room which may be used free by community groups and not-for-profit organisations. It can accommodate up to 30 people when seated lecture style. The meeting room opens onto an inviting outdoor area called the “Atrium”.

The library has 16 internet computers available for use by library members and visitors. These can be booked by clients on the library’s self-booking computer system. Training sessions in the use of the internet and email are conducted by library staff.

The library holds books and audiovisual items suitable for all age groups. In 2010 it added downloadable items (ebooks, talking books and music) to its holdings for library members to access. All library items can be searched for on the library’s online catalogue.

== Free activities ==
Numerous free activities are held throughout the year for library members. These include book launches, meet the author events, and other activities suitable for all age groups.

The library also hosts activities specifically for junior clients during the school holidays. The Capalaba Library, along with the other Redland City Council libraries, offers technology sessions for clients. These cover topics such as selling on eBay, ancestry.com, a look at Google products, and other sessions.
