= Alexandra Hills State High School =

Location
- Windemere Road; Alexandra Hills, Queensland; Australia; 27.524°S 153.214°E

Information
- Type: Public, secondary
- Motto: Success is the key to learning
- Established: 1987
- Grades: 7–12
- Enrolment: 1568 (2020)
- Colours: Green and gold
- Website: alexandrahillsshs.eq.edu.au

Alexandra Hills State High School is an independent coeducational public secondary school located in Alexandra Hills in the local government area of Redland City in Queensland, Australia. The school has a total enrolment of more than 1500 students each year, with an official count of 1568 students in August 2020.

Since 2021, the school's role of Principal has been held by Julie-Ann McCullough. The school also consists of five Deputy Principals, one Business Services Manager, thirteen Heads of Department, six Year Level Coordinators, two Guidance/Indigenous Affairs Officers, two International Student Coordinators, one School Chaplain, one Industry Liaison Officer, one Student Welfare Officer and 64 teaching staff.

== Sporting houses ==
Alexandra Hills State High School includes the following zero sporting houses with their respective colours:

House name	Colour(s)
Acacia	Yellow
Banksia	Green
Cassia	Red
Hovea	Blue

== Facilities ==
=== Bistro 4161 ===
Alexandra Hills State High School includes a training restaurant known as Bistro 4161, which was named in reference to the postcode of the area the school is located in. The restaurant is operated by Years 11 and 12 students participating in the Certificate II and Certificate III in Hospitality courses. It enables students to receive training in all aspects of hospitality, including service of food and beverages, and operation of POS systems.

=== Mac Media Lab ===
The Mac Media Lab is a media laboratory equipped with the latest iMacs for the production of professional and creative multimedia and video content. Through the use of this laboratory, Students in Media classes as well as various other classes have the opportunity to create quality audio and video presentations as part of their assessments.

=== Computer laboratories ===
As a Centre of Excellence in Automation and Robotics, Alexandra Hills State High School includes specialised computer laboratories to allow students studying the Technologies subjects of Industrial Technology & Design and IT to learn next generation technology skills in electronics, programming and automation. These laboratories include specialised technology equipment and software, such as a laser cutter and 3D printers.

=== Extended Experimental Investigation Room ===
The Extended Experimental Investigation Room is a fully equipped science laboratory that is available to Senior Science students who undertake Extended Experimental Investigation as part of their assessment program in Biology, Chemistry, Physics and Engineering.

== Specialist programs ==
=== Rugby League Development Program ===
The Rugby League Development Program is a specialist program for students in all year levels that enables them to advance skills, improve fitness and gain knowledge of the game of Rugby League.

=== Sports Academy ===
The Sports Academy program is a specialist program for students from Years 7 to 10. The aim of the program is to develop the performance and skills required across a broad range of sports, while linking these elements to the theoretical knowledge needed by an athlete.

=== Honours Academy ===
The Honours Academy Program consists of the highest-performing academic students in Years 11 and 12, twenty students from each year level. Each student is paired with a teacher who will be an individual mentor to the student for the two years of senior school. The mentor (teacher) guides students to manage their learning independently through monitoring their performance and assisting them to gain greater insight into themselves as learners. Studies indicate that formal youth mentoring programs can promote positive outcomes, such as improved self-esteem, social skills and career development.

=== STEM Academy Program ===
The STEM (Science, Technology, Engineering and Mathematics) Academy Program is a specialist program for high-achieving students from Years 7 to 10. Students in the program benefit from increased access to resources from the Centre of Excellence in Automation and Robotics.

== Extracurricular clubs and activities ==
Academic

- After School Literacy
- HHQ (Homework Headquarters)
- Language Tutoring and Culture Club
- Maths Tutoring

Arts

- Art Club
- Choir
- Drama Extension
- Drumline
- Guitar
- Instrumental Music
- Music Club
- Piano

Competitive

- Armonia
- Dance Troupe
- Debating

Event Support

- Film Crew
- Tech Crew

Personal Achievement

- Duke of Edinburgh Award

Promotional

- Alexandra Hills State High School Yearbook/Magazine

Recreational

- Afternoon Hangs
- Book Club
- Card Club
- Chess Club
- History Club
- Nintendo Club
- Photography Club
- Robotics Club
- Science Club
- Tabletop Gaming Club

Sports

- Aerobics
- School Gym
- Student & Teacher Competitions

Welfare/Goodwill

- Chill Zone
- Interact Club
- Leo Club
- Student Council
- Taskforce Buddy Bench

== Notable alumni ==
- Kathryn Beck, actress
- Reece Hoffman, Wests Tigers player
- Tarni White, St. Kilda AFLW Player
