= Capalaba bus station =

Bus station in Capalaba, Australia

Coordinates: 27°31′20.16″S 153°11′26.21″E

Capalaba
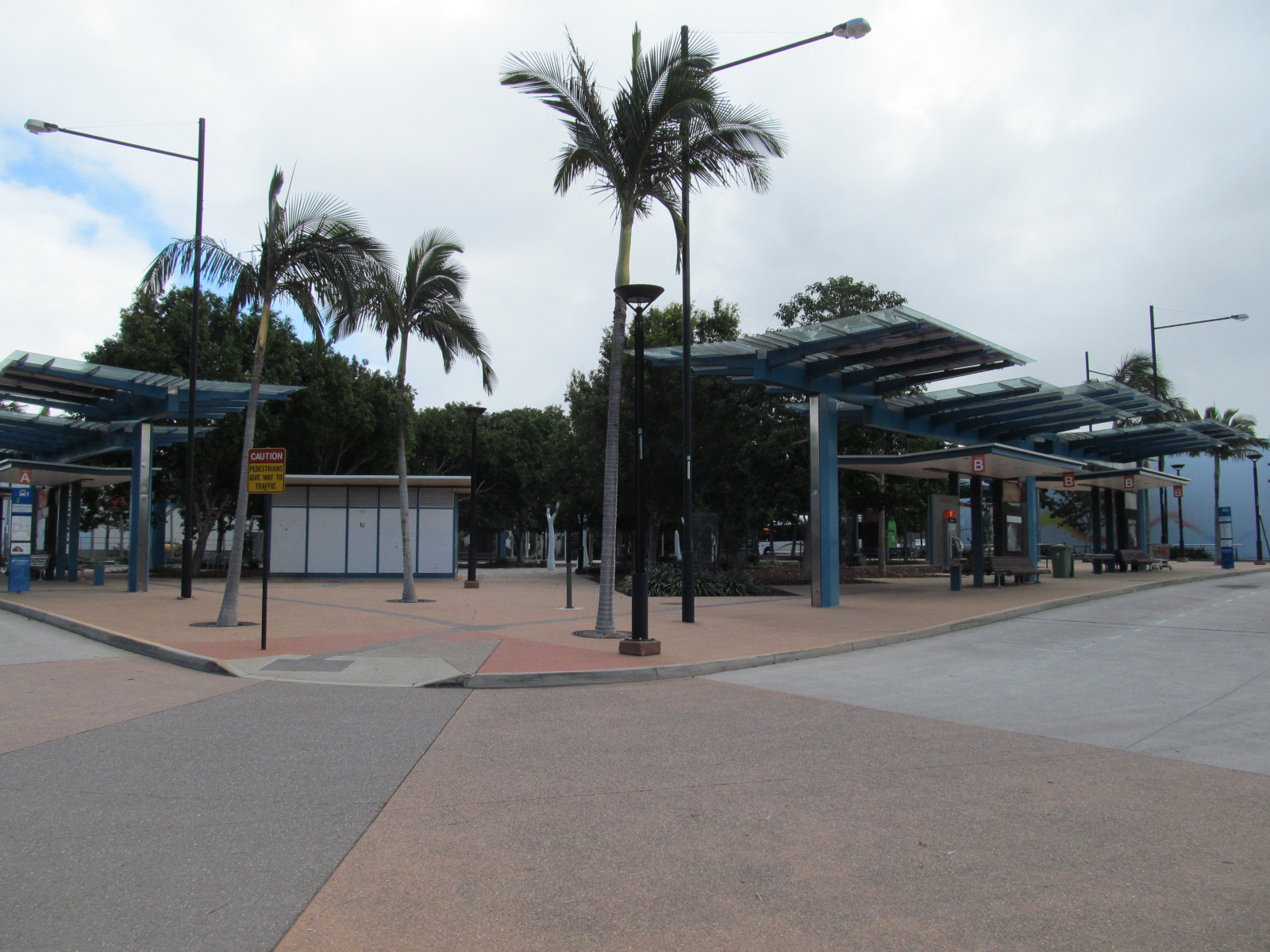

General information
- Location: Redland Bay Road, Capalaba
- Owner: Translink
- Platforms: 5
Location

Capalaba is a bus station operated by Translink. It is part of the Capalaba Shopping Precinct and is a primary interchange for Translink's Eastern Region.

The bus station comprises a square island with platforms (A–D) on each side surrounding landscaping work, community art pieces, shelters and an amenities block. Each platform can accommodate two buses and on the opposite side of Platforms A and B is parking for up to six buses. A fifth platform (E) is located on the opposite side of Redland Bay Road and it services morning express routes and some school services.

== Services ==
Capalaba bus station is serviced by Transdev Queensland and Mt Gravatt Bus Service. Following is a list of the public routes using the station: 240, 241, 260, 262, 263, 264, 266, N250, 250, 251, 252, 254, 270, 275, 273
