= Reece Hoffman =

Australian rugby league footballer

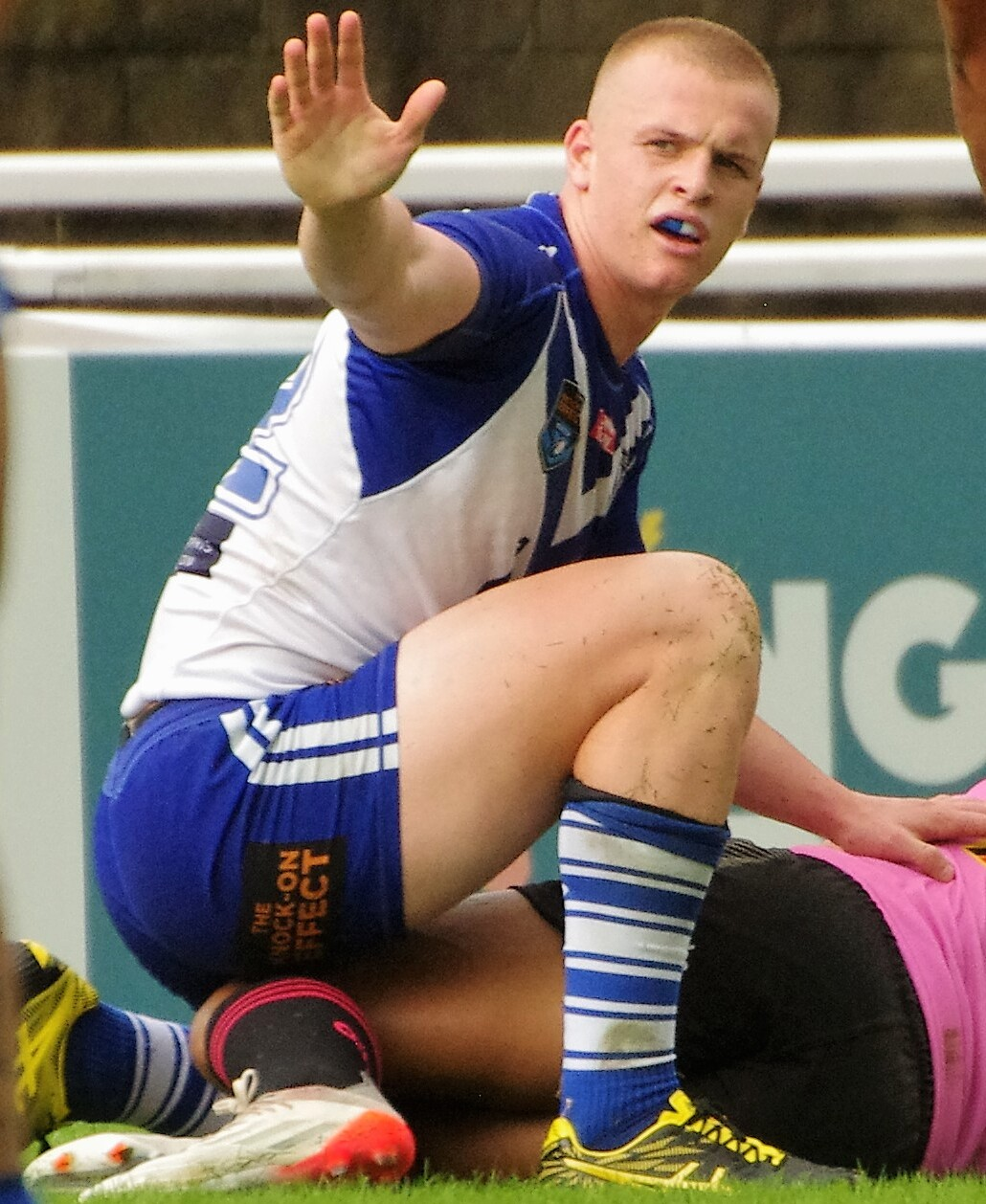

Personal information
- Born: 22 May 2001 (age 23); Brisbane, Queensland, Australia
- Height: 187 cm (6 ft 2 in)
- Weight: 95 kg (14 st 13 lb)

Playing information
- Position: Wing
Club
Years	Team	Pld	T	G	FG	P
2020	Wests Tigers	1	1	0	0	4
- Source: As of 27 January 2022

Reece Hoffman (born 22 March 2001) is an Australian former professional rugby league footballer who last played for the Canterbury-Bankstown Bulldogs in the National Rugby League (NRL).

He previously played for the Wests Tigers in the NRL as a winger

== Background ==
Born in Brisbane, Queensland, Hoffman played his junior rugby league for the Wynnum Manly Seagulls and attended Alexandra Hills State High School.

== Playing career ==
In 2018, Hoffman played for Wynnum Manly's Mal Meninga Cup side and later that season moved up to the Hastings Deering Colts. In 2019, he again started the season in the Mal Meninga Cup and moved up to the Colts, before making his Queensland Cup debut for the Seagulls.

In June 2019, he represented the Queensland under-18 team before being signed by the Wests Tigers on a three-year deal. In September 2019, he started at centre in Wynnum Manly's Colts Grand Final loss to the Sunshine Coast Falcons.

=== 2020 ===
In 2020, Hoffman started the season playing for the Tigers' Jersey Flegg Cup side.

In Round 9 of the 2020 NRL season, he made NRL debut against the South Sydney Rabbitohs, scoring a try.

=== 2024 ===
On 2 August, Canterbury Bulldogs General Manager of Football Phil Gould confirmed the retirement of Hoffman, who made no appearances for the club's top grade during his two-year tenure.
