= Alexandra Hills, Queensland =

Alexandra Hills
- Suburb
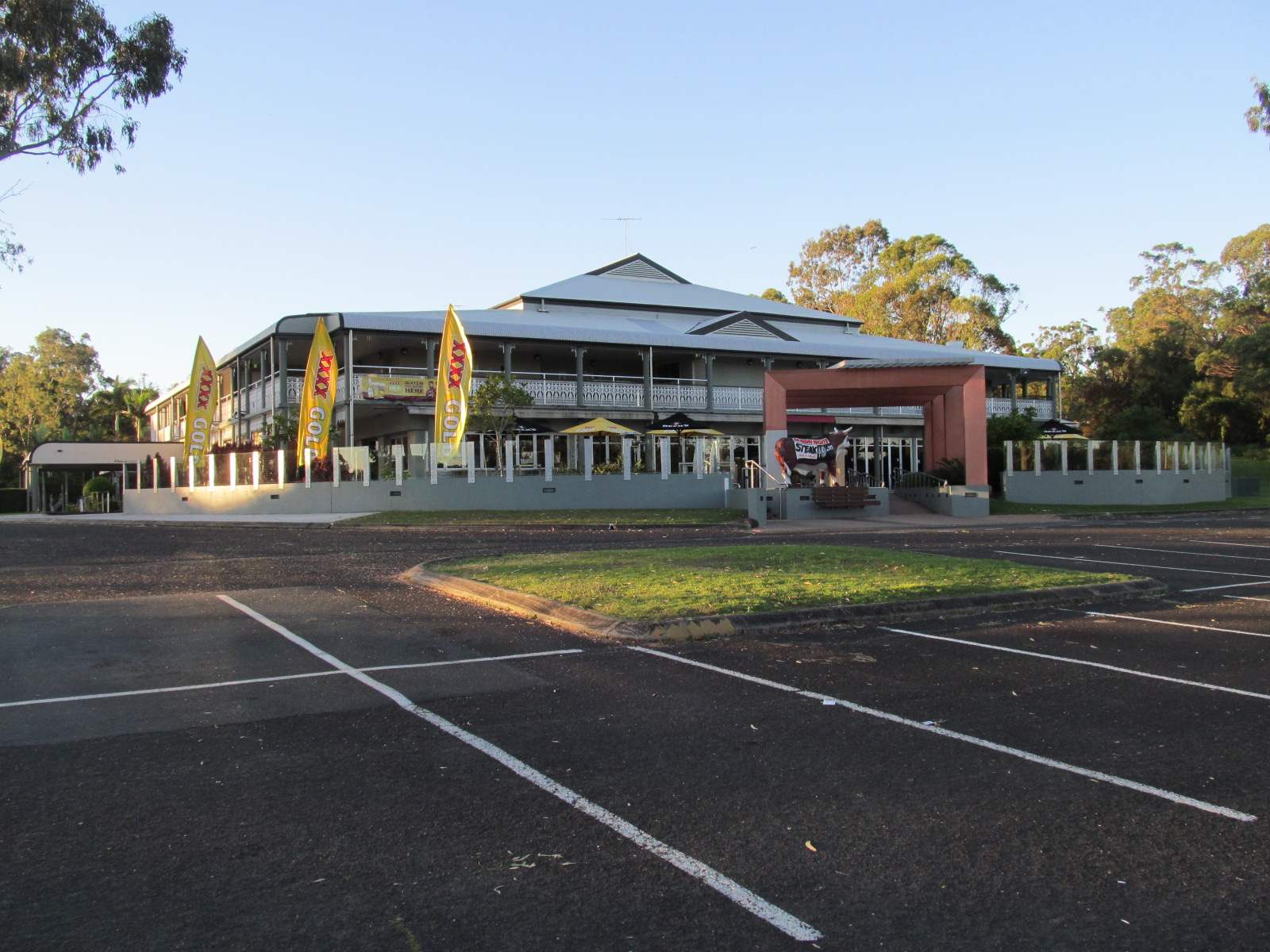
- Alexandra Hills hotel, 2013

- Interactive map of Alexandra Hills
- Coordinates: 27.5333°S 153.2255°E
- Country: Australia
- State: Queensland
- City: Redland City
- LGA: Redland City
- Location: 6.2 km (3.9 mi) W of Cleveland; 23.4 km (14.5 mi) ESE of Brisbane CBD

Government
  - State electorates: Capalaba; Redlands
  - Federal division: Bowman

Area
  - Total: 13.7 km^{2} (5.3 sq mi)
- Elevation: 16 m (52 ft)

Population
  - Total: 16,472 (2021 census)
  - Density: 1,202/km^{2} (3,114/sq mi)
- Time zone: UTC+10:00 (AEST)
- Postcode: 4161
- Mean max temp: 25.1 °C (77.2 °F)
- Mean min temp: 14.5 °C (58.1 °F)
- Annual rainfall: 1,271.6 mm (50.06 in)
Suburbs around Alexandra Hills
Birkdale	Wellington Point	Ormiston
Capalaba	Alexandra Hills	Cleveland
Capalaba	Sheldon	Thornlands

Alexandra Hills is a residential locality in the City of Redland, Queensland, Australia. In the 2021 census, Alexandra Hills had a population of 16,472 people.

== Geography ==
Alexandra Hills sits between two major areas of Redlands, with Cleveland to the east and Capalaba to the west. Alexandra Hills itself is notable as the only enclaved suburb of the largely coastal Redland City.

Finucane Crossing is near the western edge of locality (27.5237°S 153.2461°E). It is near where Finucane Road crosses Hilliards Creek into neighbouring Ormiston and Cleveland.

=== Climate ===
Pinkenba has a warm humid subtropical climate (Köppen: Cfa) with hot, wet summers and very mild, drier winters. On average, the suburb experiences 82.1 clear days and 59.9 cloudy days per annum. The wettest recorded day was 30 June 2005 with 307.4 mm (12.10 in) of rainfall. Extreme temperatures ranged from 38.2 °C (100.8 °F) on 24 February 2008 to 0.0 °C (32.0 °F) on 19 July 1972.

Climate data for Alexandra Hills (Redland HRS) (27.53°S 153.25°E) (16 m (52 ft) AMSL) (1953-2013)
Month	Jan	Feb	Mar	Apr	May	Jun	Jul	Aug	Sep	Oct	Nov	Dec	Year
Record high °C (°F)	37.5 (99.5)	38.2 (100.8)	35.6 (96.1)	32.7 (90.9)	29.3 (84.7)	25.9 (78.6)	27.4 (81.3)	31.6 (88.9)	33.4 (92.1)	35.1 (95.2)	36.6 (97.9)	36.6 (97.9)	38.2 (100.8)
Mean daily maximum °C (°F)	28.9 (84.0)	28.5 (83.3)	27.6 (81.7)	25.9 (78.6)	23.2 (73.8)	21.0 (69.8)	20.4 (68.7)	21.5 (70.7)	23.5 (74.3)	25.3 (77.5)	26.8 (80.2)	28.1 (82.6)	25.1 (77.1)
Mean daily minimum °C (°F)	20.0 (68.0)	19.9 (67.8)	18.6 (65.5)	15.8 (60.4)	12.5 (54.5)	9.7 (49.5)	8.2 (46.8)	8.4 (47.1)	10.9 (51.6)	14.2 (57.6)	16.7 (62.1)	18.6 (65.5)	14.5 (58.0)
Record low °C (°F)	9.5 (49.1)	13.0 (55.4)	10.9 (51.6)	5.0 (41.0)	2.3 (36.1)	1.0 (33.8)	0.0 (32.0)	0.1 (32.2)	2.6 (36.7)	4.2 (39.6)	5.7 (42.3)	9.2 (48.6)	0.0 (32.0)
Average precipitation mm (inches)	160.6 (6.32)	164.1 (6.46)	161.9 (6.37)	106.6 (4.20)	112.1 (4.41)	88.1 (3.47)	61.3 (2.41)	52.2 (2.06)	38.3 (1.51)	83.8 (3.30)	102.7 (4.04)	142.2 (5.60)	1,271.6 (50.06)
Average precipitation days (≥ 0.2 mm)	11.5	13.1	12.8	11.4	10.1	8.3	7.3	6.3	7.0	9.1	10.2	10.9	118
Average afternoon relative humidity (%)	66	68	68	66	63	61	58	56	58	62	65	66	63
Average dew point °C (°F)	20.4 (68.7)	20.4 (68.7)	19.2 (66.6)	16.9 (62.4)	14.2 (57.6)	11.4 (52.5)	10.0 (50.0)	10.4 (50.7)	12.6 (54.7)	15.4 (59.7)	17.5 (63.5)	19.2 (66.6)	15.6 (60.1)
Source: Bureau of Meteorology (1953-2013)

== History ==
Alexandra Hills State School opened on 28 January 1975.

St Anthony's Catholic Primary School opened on 1 January 1980 on a 5.974-hectare (14.76-acre) site purchased by the Archdiocese of Brisbane. The school opened with 157 students under the leadership of Presentation Sister Kieran McNamara. Archbishop Francis Rush blessed and officially blessed the school on Sunday 9 March 1980.

Vienna Woods State School opened on 29 January 1985.

Alexandra Hills State High School opened on 27 January 1987.

Hilliard State School opened on 29 January 1991.

The Anglican Church of the Resurrection was dedicated in 1991 and consecrated in 2010.

The Sycamore School opened in 2017 to provide special education for children with autism.

== Demographics ==
In the 2021 census, Alexandra Hills had a population of 16,472 people, 50.6% female and 49.4% male. The median age of the Alexandra Hills population was 38 years, the same as the national median. 77% of people living in Alexandra Hills were born in Australia. The other top responses for country of birth were New Zealand 5.1%, England 4.0%, Philippines 1.1%, South Africa 1.0%, and India 0.8%. 87.9% of people spoke only English at home; the next most common languages were 0.5% Mandarin, 0.4% Tagalog, 0.4% Spanish, 0.4% Punjabi and 0.4% Afrikaans. In total, 11.5% of households used a language other than English at home. 66.1% of the population were actively employed, with 57% being employed on a full-time basis, 29.4% employed part-time and 4.5% unemployed. The median weekly income reported was $824, above both the Queensland median of $787 and the Australian median of $805.

In the 2016 census, Alexandra Hills had a population of 16,254 people.

In the 2011 census, Alexandra Hills had a population of 16,728 people.

== Education ==
Alexandra Hills State School is a government primary (Prep–6) school for boys and girls at 12 Princeton Avenue (27.5181°S 153.2212°E). In 2018, the school had an enrolment of 199 students with 24 teachers (15 full-time equivalent) and 31 non-teaching staff (22 full-time equivalent). It includes a special education program.

Vienna Woods State School is a government primary (Prep–6) school for boys and girls at 12 Heffernan Road (27.5279°S 153.2300°E). In 2018, the school had an enrolment of 253 students with 25 teachers (19 full-time equivalent) and 17 non-teaching staff (11 full-time equivalent). It includes a special education program.

Hilliard State School is a government primary (Prep–6) school for boys and girls on the corner of Alexandra Circuit and Hanover Drive (27.5422°S 153.2300°E). In 2018, the school had an enrolment of 733 students with 55 teachers (47 full-time equivalent) and 30 non-teaching staff (20 full-time equivalent). It includes a special education program.

St Anthony's School is a Catholic primary (Prep–6) school for boys and girls at St Anthony's Drive (27.5206°S 153.2165°E). In 2018, the school had an enrolment of 477 students with 35 teachers (32 full-time equivalent) and 27 non-teaching staff (14 full-time equivalent).

The Sycamore School is a private primary (Prep–6) school for boys and girls with autism on the Alexandra Hills TAFE Campus at 29 Windemere Road (27.5254°S 153.2104°E). In 2018, the school had an enrolment of 62 students with 11 teachers (10 full-time equivalent) and 18 non-teaching staff (15 full-time equivalent).

Alexandra Hills State High School is a government secondary (7–12) school for boys and girls at Windemere Road (27.5237°S 153.2154°E). In 2018, the school had an enrolment of 1457 students with 123 teachers (116 full-time equivalent) and 60 non-teaching staff (44 full-time equivalent). It includes a special education program. The school is the home of 136 Army Cadet Unit – City of Redlands. Until 2010, it was the largest school in the City of Redland but rapid growth of enrolments at Cleveland District State High School have put Alexandra Hills into 2nd place since 2011.

The Alexandra Hills Campus of the Metropolitan South Institute of TAFE is in Windermere Street (27.5252°S 153.2122°E) and is adjacent to Alexandra Hills State High School.

== Amenities ==
The Redland City Council operates a mobile library service which visits the Bluebell Street Shops.

The Anglican Church of the Resurrection is at 48 Newhaven Street (corner Windermere Street, 27.5258°S 153.2157°E).

Alexandra Hills is home to the popular McGuire's owned venue 'The Alexandra Hills Hotel' or colloquially known as 'The Alex'. The hotel is situated on the outer edges of Alexandra Hills almost bordering nearby suburbs Wellington Point and Cleveland. The hotel is also home to the 'Squeeze Club', a weekend nightclub commonly referred to as 'The Pit'. It is located on the top level of the Hotel.

== Parks, bushland and recreation ==
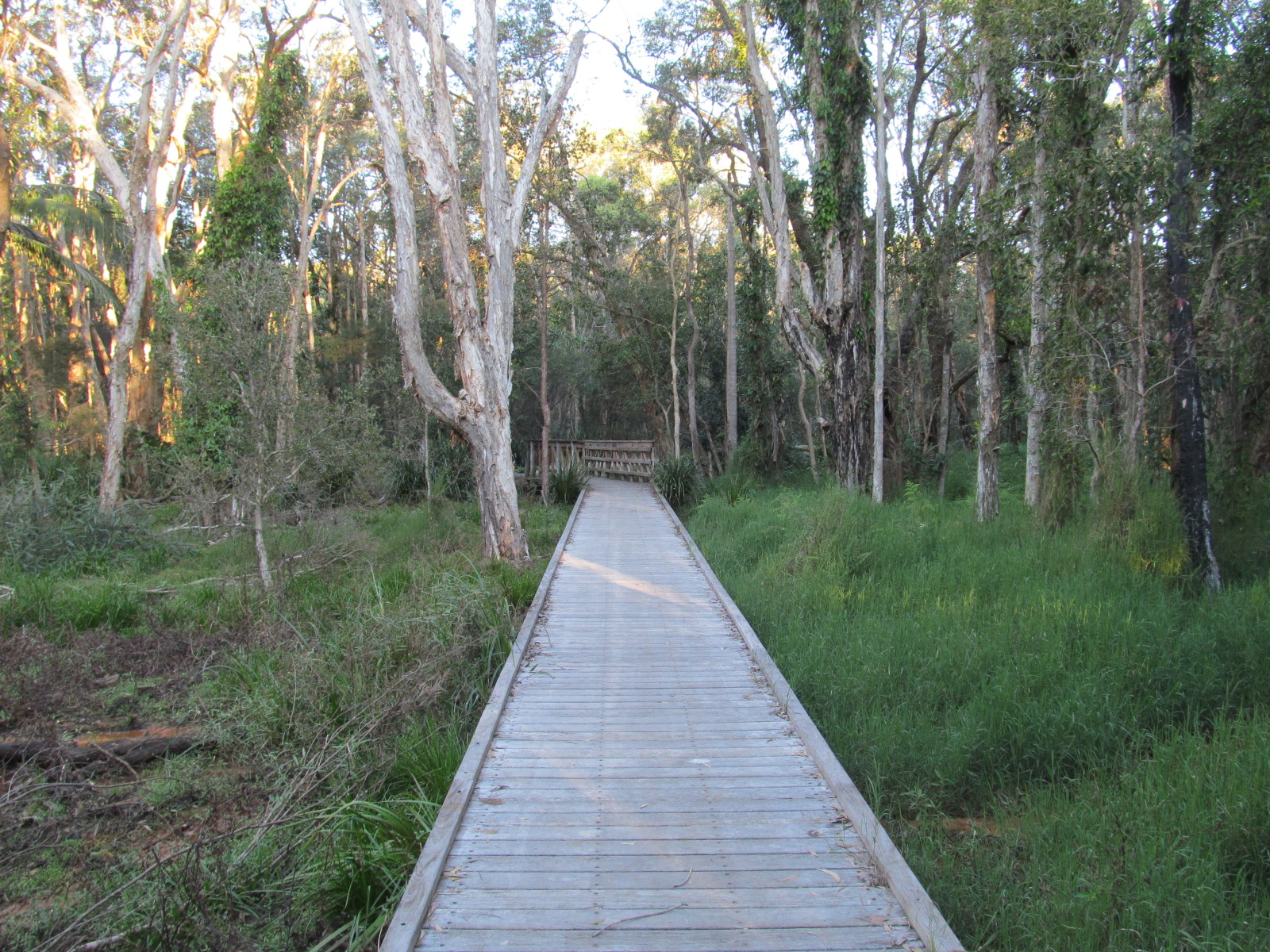
Squirrel Glider Conservation Area, 2013

- Windemere Road Park
- Coolwinpin Creek
- Valantine Park
- Community Centre
- Keith Surridge Oval
- Hanover Drive Park
- George Street Park
- Hilliards Creek Platypus Corridor
- Scribbly Gums Conservation Area

Windemere Road Park is the most developed park in Alexandra Hills. The most recent addition has been a climbing wall. It also hosts a flying fox, skate/bike bowl, basketball court and an off the leash area for dogs. The park itself stretches from Windemere Road to Cumberland Drive.

The George Street and Hanover Drive Parks also have dog off-leash areas and there is a trial area in Valantine Park.

Scribbly Gums Conservation Area is located on the eastern edge of Alexandra Hills, bordered by Redland Hospital to the east, and Flinders St and Winchester Rd to the north. The conservation area occupies approximately 152 hectares and contains the Redlands Track Park - a collection of 30+ mountain bike trails totalling over 32 kilometres (20 mi) in length. The conservation area is also home to the Scribbly Gums Conservation parkrun, which started in October 2022. It's one of the more challenging parkruns in the Brisbane area, being entirely offroad and with a total elevation change of around 90m.

== Sporting clubs ==
- Alexandra Hills Bombers Australian Rules Football Club
- Alexandra Hills Cricket Club
- Meteors Netball Club
