= Brisbane Koala Bushlands =

Parklands in Brisbane, Australia

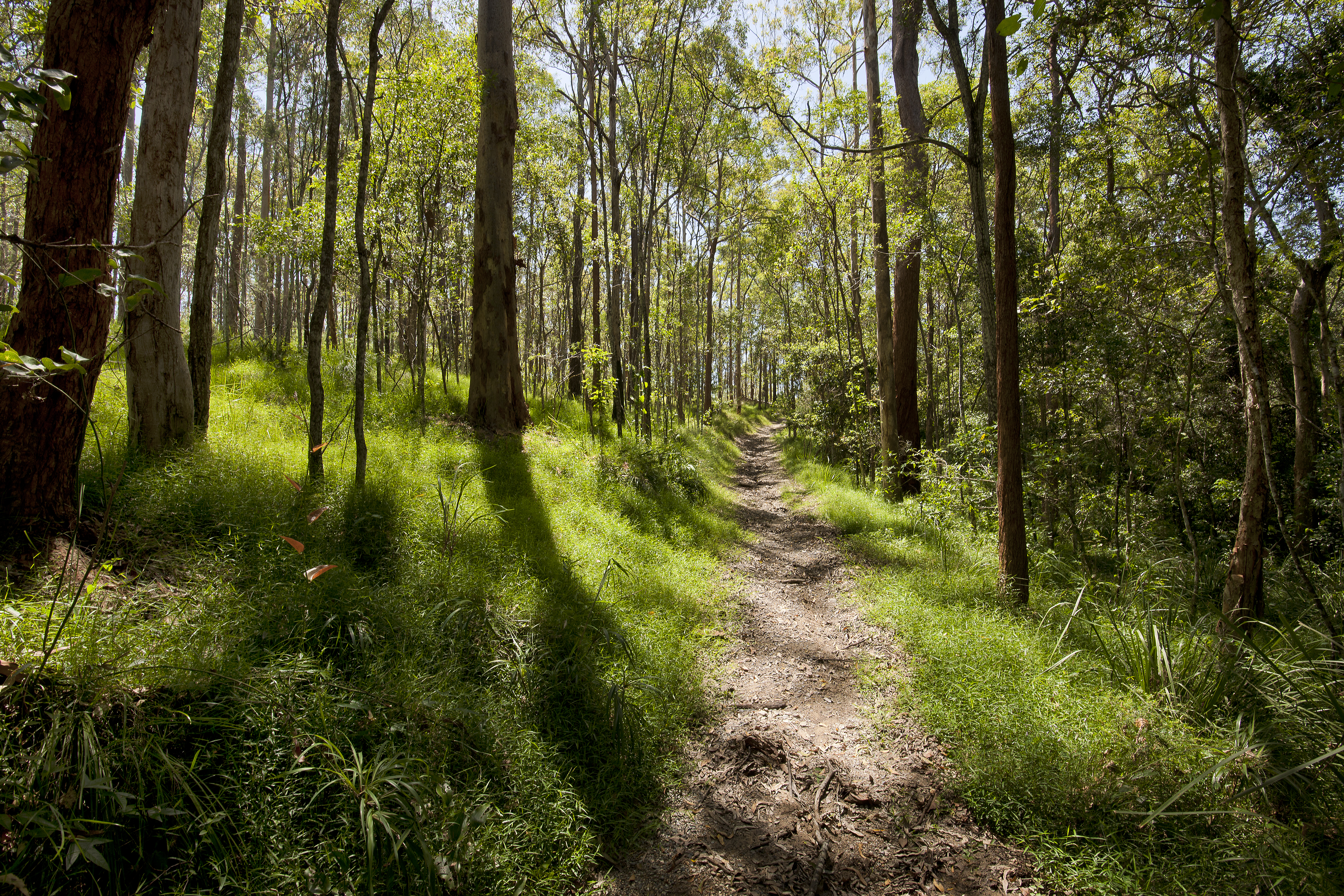
Hiking trails, 2012

The Brisbane Koala Bushlands are a series of protected areas in the south east corner of the Brisbane local government area in Queensland, Australia. The area is intended to protect significant koala habitat. The bushlands are part of the Koala Coast which covers a wider area that is home to thousands of koalas. The bushlands were founded in 1992.

Funds from the Bushland Preservation Levy have permitted the purchase of properties. Some of preserved land was donated.

The bushlands feature walking tracks, picnic areas, and an information hub. The picnic area is shaded and has several tables, benches and BBQs. The entrance to the main picnic area is on Alperton Road, Burbank. Gates are locked between 6 p.m. and 8 a.m. Horse riding is permitted on certain trails.

The main weeds in Brisbane Koala Bushlands are lantana (Lantana camara), groundsel bush (Baccharis halimifolia) and exotic grasses.

One should never approach or touch a wild koala.

== See also ==
- Flora of Brisbane
- Parks and gardens of Brisbane
- Protected areas of Queensland
