= Burbank, Queensland =

Burbank
- Suburb
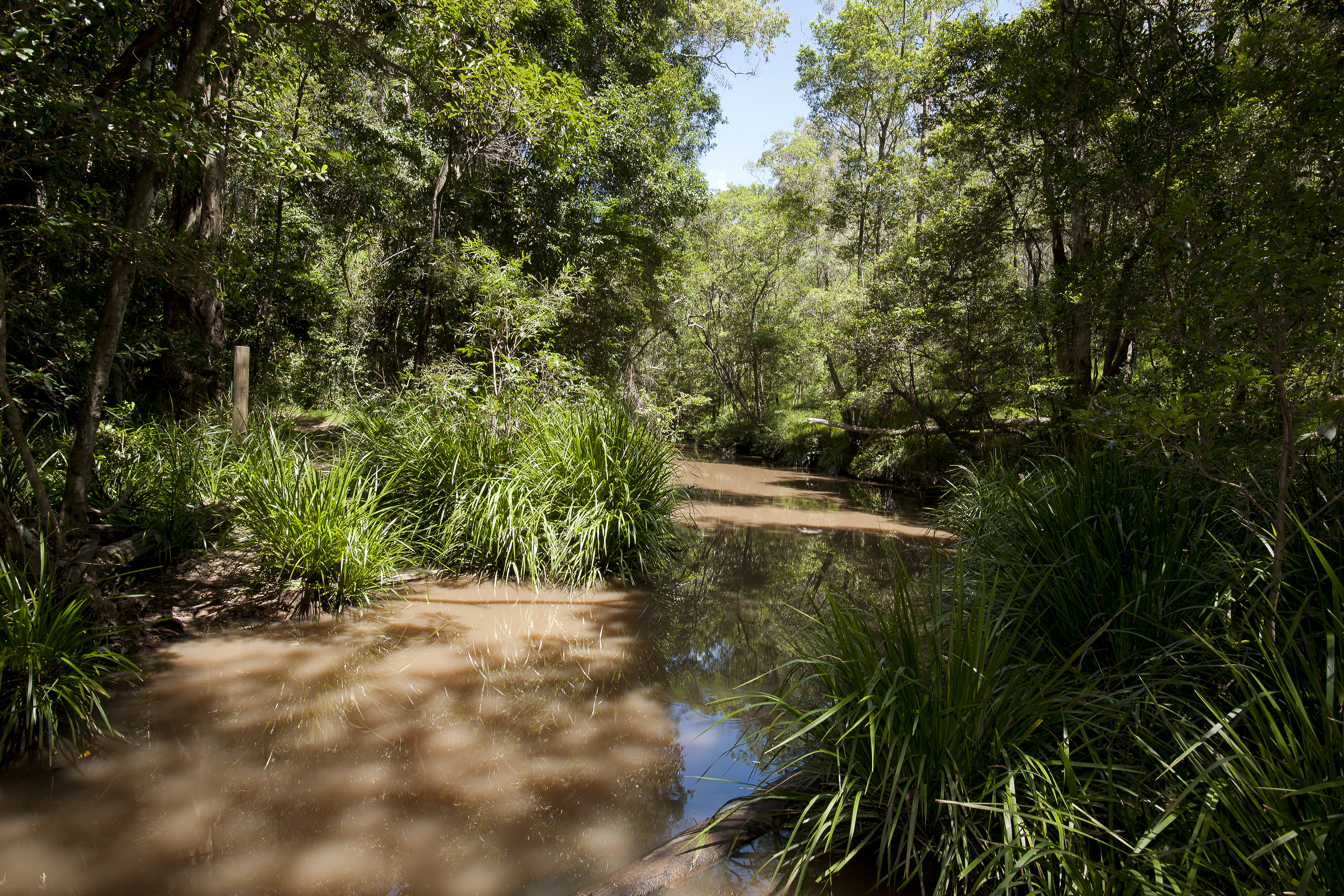
- Waterway in Brisbane Koala Bushlands, 2012

- Interactive map of Burbank
- Coordinates: 27.5583°S 153.1588°E
- Country: Australia
- State: Queensland
- City: Brisbane
- LGA: City of Brisbane (Chandler Ward)
- Location: 18.6 km (11.6 mi) SE of Brisbane CBD

Government
  - State electorate: Mansfield
  - Federal division: Bonner

Area
  - Total: 30.3 km^{2} (11.7 sq mi)

Population
  - Total: 1,051 (2021 census)
  - Density: 34.69/km^{2} (89.84/sq mi)
- Time zone: UTC+10:00 (AEST)
- Postcode: 4156
Suburbs around Burbank
| Belmont; Mackenzie | Chandler | Capalaba |
| Rochedale | Burbank | Sheldon |
| Rochedale South | Priestdale | Sheldon |

Burbank is a greenbelt suburb in the City of Brisbane, Queensland, Australia. In the 2021 census, Burbank had a population of 1,051 people.

== Geography ==
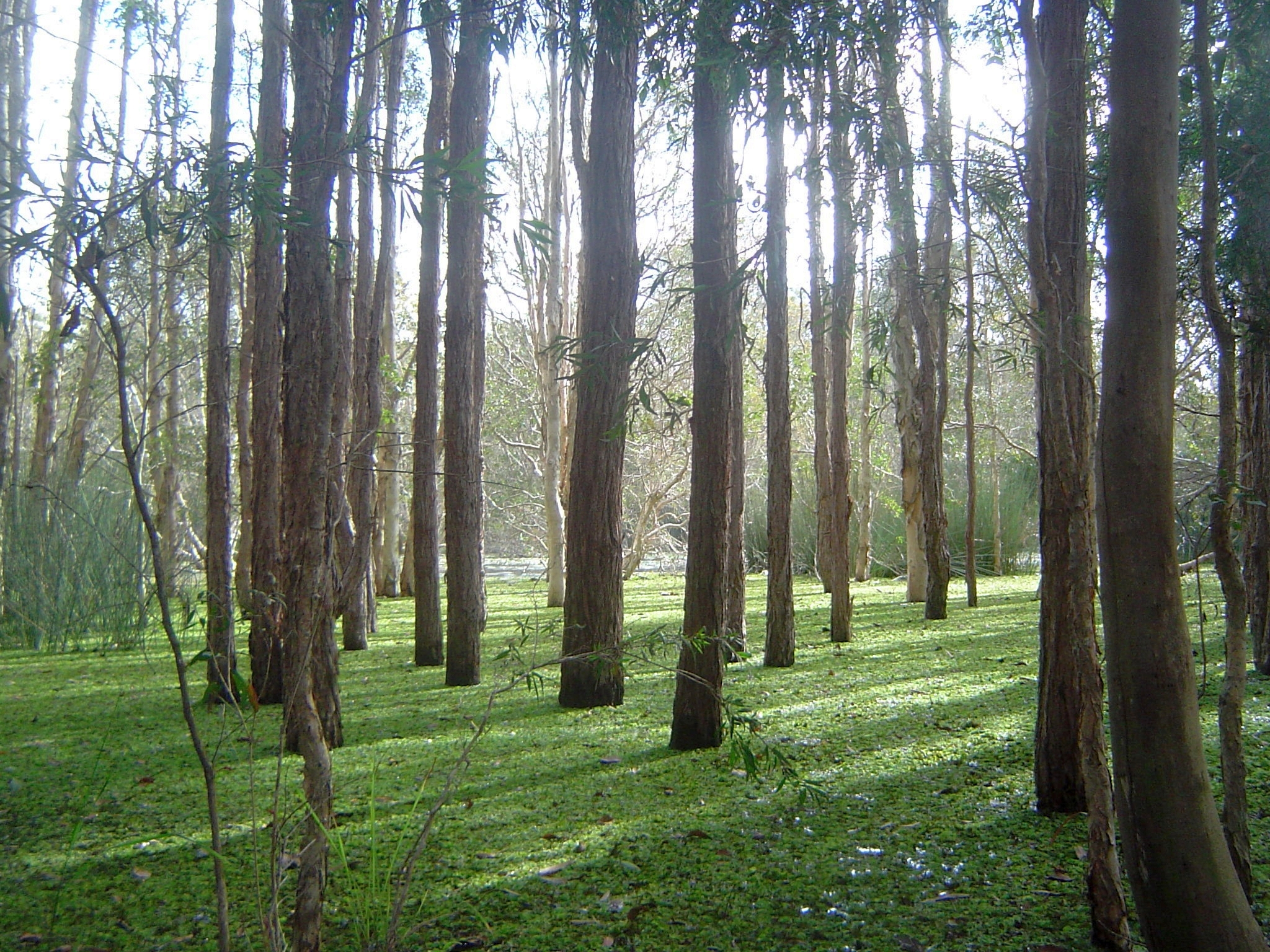
Leslie Harrison Dam, 2011

Burbank is an outer suburb of City of Brisbane and borders City of Redland to the east and City of Logan to the south. It is bounded in the east by Tingalpa Creek, and was hence known as Upper Tingalpa until 1976.

Brisbane Koala Bushlands has been established in the suburb since 1992.

== History ==
The area was originally known as Upper Tingalpa. The suburb was named after Alfred Harry Burbank, a surveyor and farmer, who was a resident in the area from 1890 to 1908. Burbank carried out surveys across Queensland over his 65-year career. Frank Burbank, a local horse breeder and timber-getter, was his son. Frank stayed in the area until his death in the 1950s. Burbank was officially named on 1 June 1976.

Sinai College opened on 29 January 1990.

Since the inception of the Bushland Preservation Levy in 1990, the Brisbane City Council has purchased undeveloped properties in Burbank for nature reserves. A koala habitation protection called Brisbane Koala Bushlands was also created, with visitor facilities and boardwalks located on Ford Road.

In 2008, a private property at Burbank became the first property to be classified as conservation area under an environmental covenant with the Brisbane City Council.

== Demographics ==
Burbank has not been subdivided into small residential blocks of land to ensure the population remains low. In 2009, Burbank had the third highest median house price in Australia, at A$1.1 million. In 2008, census data revealed that Burbank has the most three-car households in Brisbane, at a rate of 40%. As at 2010, residents of Burbank remained living in the suburb for an average of 13 years, which is the fourth longest in Brisbane, behind nearby Sheldon and both Point Lookout and Amity Point on North Stradbroke Island.

In the 2016 census, Burbank had a population of 1,050 people.

In the 2021 census, Burbank had a population of 1,051 people.

== Education ==
Sinai College is a private primary (Prep-6) school for boys and girls at 20 Moxon Road (27.5558°S 153.1448°E). In 2018, the school had an enrolment of 30 students with 5 teachers (4 full-time equivalent) and 3 non-teaching staff (2 full-time equivalent).

There are no government schools in Burbank. The nearest government primary schools are:

- Gumdale State School in Gumdale to the north-west
- Mackenzie State Primary School (previously Mount Petrie State School) in neighbouring Mackenzie to the west
- Capalaba State College in neighbouring Capalaba to the north-east
- Rochedale State School in neighbouring Rochedale to the west
- Rochedale South State School in neighbouring Rochedale South to the south-west

The nearest government secondary schools are:

- Mansfield State High School in Mansfield to the north-west
- Rochedale State High School in neighbouring Rochedale to the west
- Capalaba State College in neighbouring Capalaba to the north-east.

== Amenities ==
There are a number of parks in the area:

- Alperton Road Park (27.5724°S 153.1560°E)
- Ford Road Park (27.5902°S 153.1539°E)
- J.C. Trotter Memorial Park (27.5525°S 153.1716°E)
- Leacroft Road Park (27.5705°S 153.1729°E)
- Longton Court Park (no.100) (27.5891°S 153.1694°E)
- Mt Petrie Recreation Reserve (27.5472°S 153.1366°E)
- Prout Road (485) Park (27.5325°S 153.1582°E)
- Prout Road Park (27.5365°S 153.1476°E)
- Suzette Street Park (27.5572°S 153.1786°E)
- Upfield Street Park (27.5569°S 153.1511°E)

== See also ==
- List of Brisbane suburbs
