= Leslie Harrison Dam =

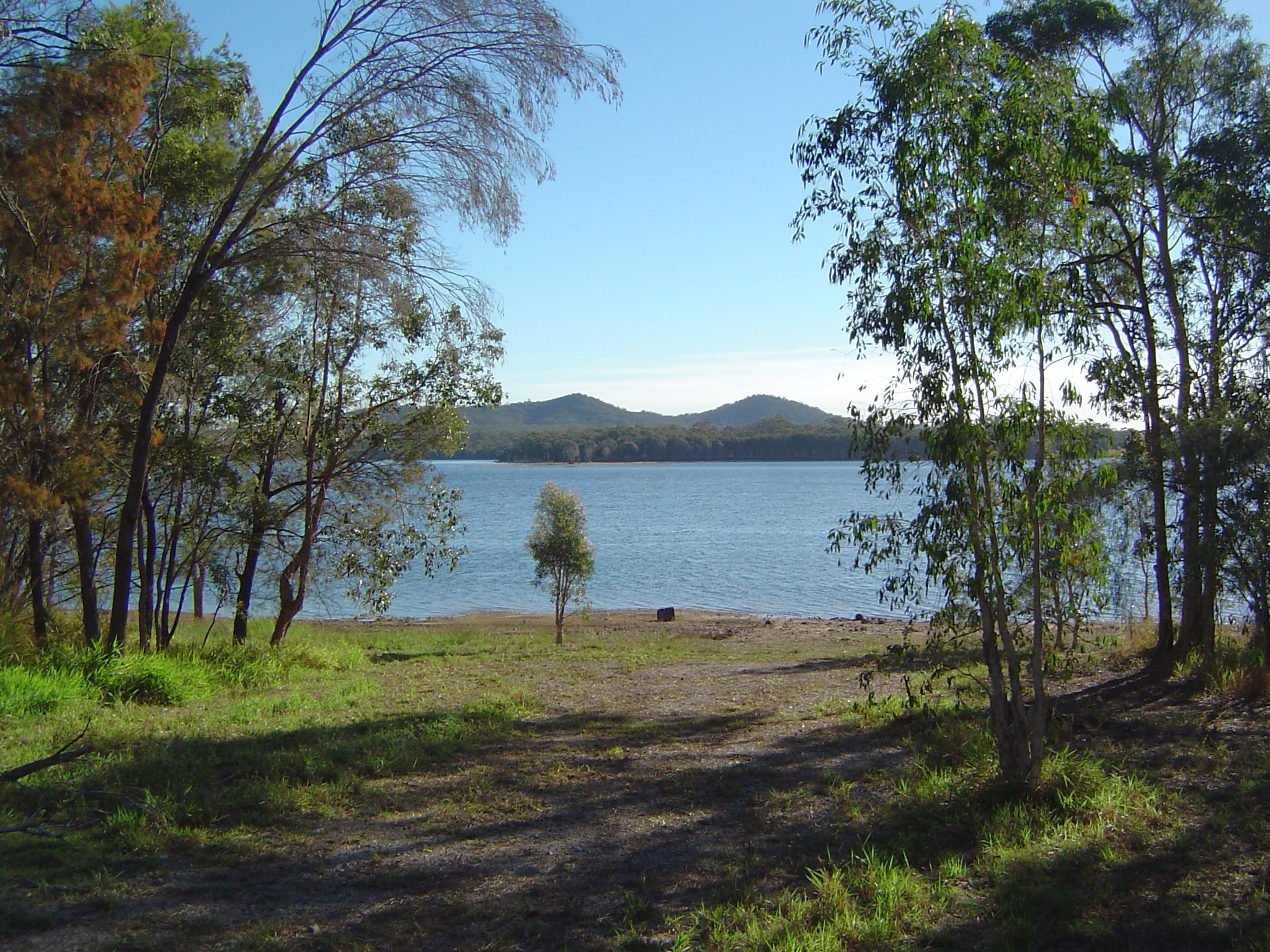
- The dam, in 2014

- Location of the dam in Queensland
- Interactive map of Leslie Harrison Dam
- Country: Australia
- Location: South East Queensland
- Coordinates: 27°31′41″S 153°10′49″E
- Purpose: Potable water supply
- Status: Operational
- Opening date: 1968; 1984 (raised/gates installed); 2014 (gates removed)
- Operator: SEQ Water

Dam and spillways
- Type of dam: Embankment dam
- Impounds: Tingalpa Creek
- Height: 25 m (82 ft)
- Length: 525 m (1,722 ft)
- Dam volume: 315×10^{3} m^{3} (11.1×10^{6} cu ft)
- Spillway type: Uncontrolled (1968–1984; since 2014); Vertical lift gates (1984–2014)
- Spillway capacity: 1,450 m^{3}/s (51,000 cu ft/s)

Reservoir
- Creates: Tingalpa Reservoir
- Total capacity: 13,206 ML (10,706 acre⋅ft)
- Catchment area: 88 km^{2} (34 sq mi)
- Surface area: 470 ha (1,200 acres)
- Website seqwater.com.au

The Leslie Harrison Dam is an earth-fill embankment dam across the Tingalpa Creek, in the South East region of Queensland, Australia. The main purpose of the dam is for potable water supply of the Redland City in Brisbane. The impounded reservoir is called Tingalpa Reservoir.

The dam was named after Robert Leslie Harrison, a Queensland parliamentarian who died in April 1966.

== Overview ==
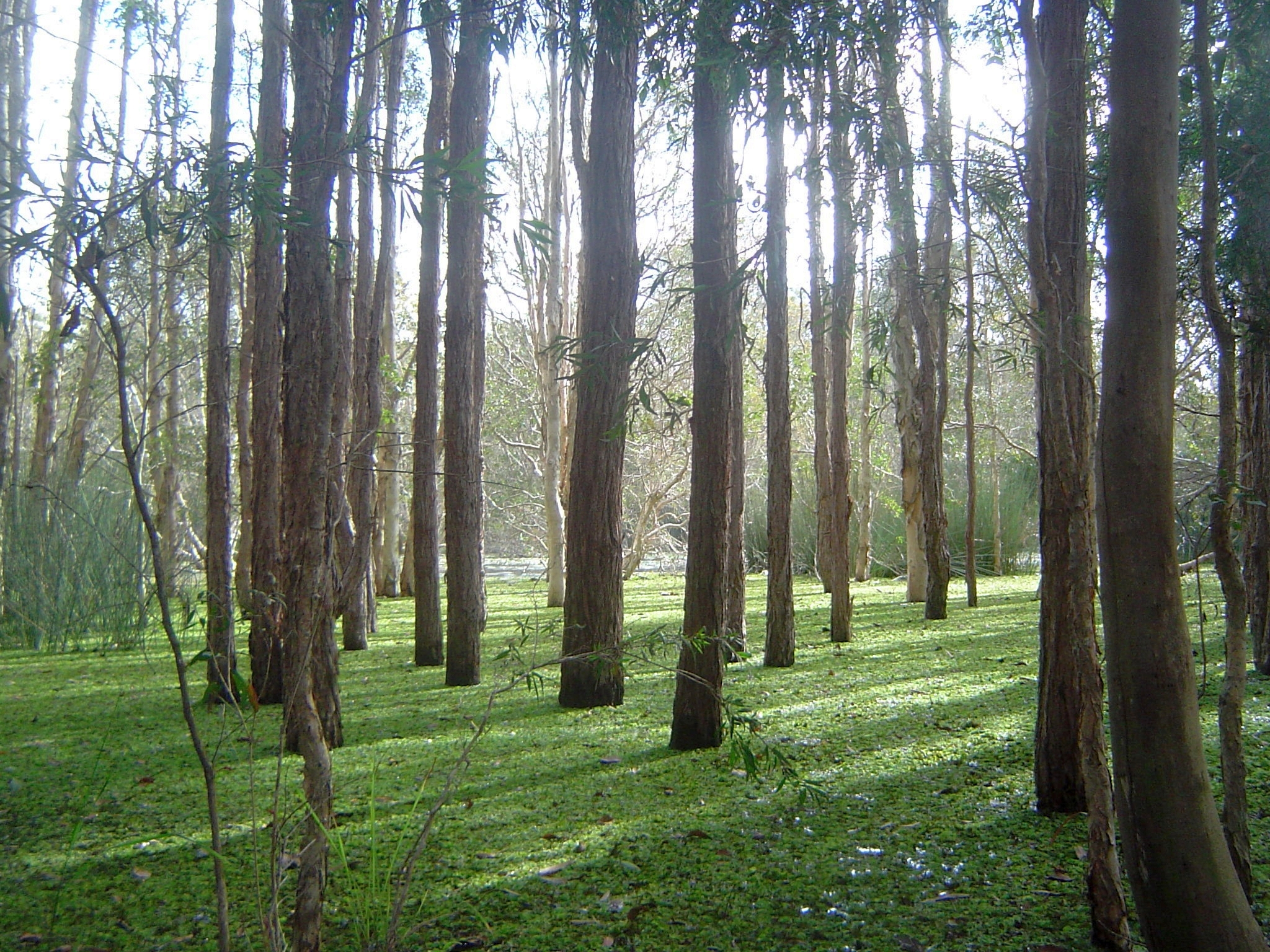
Trees bordering the dam in 2011.

The dam is located between the suburbs of Capalaba, Chandler and Burbank, approximately 16 kilometres (9.9 mi) southeast of Brisbane. The primary inflow of the reservoir is the Tingalpa Creek, not far above its mouth at Waterloo Bay. The dam is one of a number of dams connected to the South East Queensland Water Grid, and the dam provides approximately 20% of the water supply for Redland City.

Completed in 1968, the earthfill dam structure is 25 metres (82 ft) high and 535 metres (1,755 ft) long. The resultant Tingalpa Reservoir has capacity of 13,206 megalitres (10,706 acre⋅ft) when full, drawn from a catchment area of 88 square kilometres (34 sq mi) that includes much of the northern slopes of the Venman Bushland National Park. The dam reservoir surface area covers 470 hectares (1,200 acres). Controlled vertical lift gates were added to the spillway in 1984 to increase water supply to the region, and removed in 2014 to improve dam safety. The spillway has a discharge capacity of 1,450 cubic metres per second (51,000 cu ft/s).

Initially managed by the Redland City Council, management of the dam was transferred to SEQ Water in July 2008 as part of a water security project in the South East Queensland region, known as the South East Queensland Water Grid.

=== Dam improvement program ===
In 1984, the dam wall was raised and gates were installed, and in 2014, work began on improving the safety of the dam after SEQ Water completed a major investigation of its operating dams, which included draining the dam to approximately 50% capacity.

External videos
- Spillway gates removed, 2015

In 2012–13, an independent review of SEQ Water's 26 referable dams found improvements were needed at a number of dams, including Leslie Harrison, to meet the revised Queensland Dam Safety Guidelines. The detailed design for the upgrade of Leslie Harrison Dam was completed and included widening and strengthening the dam wall, anchoring the spillway, improving resilience to extreme weather events and earthquakes, and not returning the gates to the spillway.

== Recreation ==
There are no plans to introduce recreation on the Tingalpa Reservoir. In 2014, SEQ Water engaged experts to conduct a water quality study and develop a screening tool to improve understanding of the impact recreation has on water quality in drinking water lakes. The complex and comprehensive study was completed in 2016 and, using a screening tool, determined that given the reservoir's role as a drinking water source for the Redlands, recreation cannot be considered because of unacceptable risks to water quality.

== See also ==
- List of dams in Queensland
