= Ferry transport in Queensland =

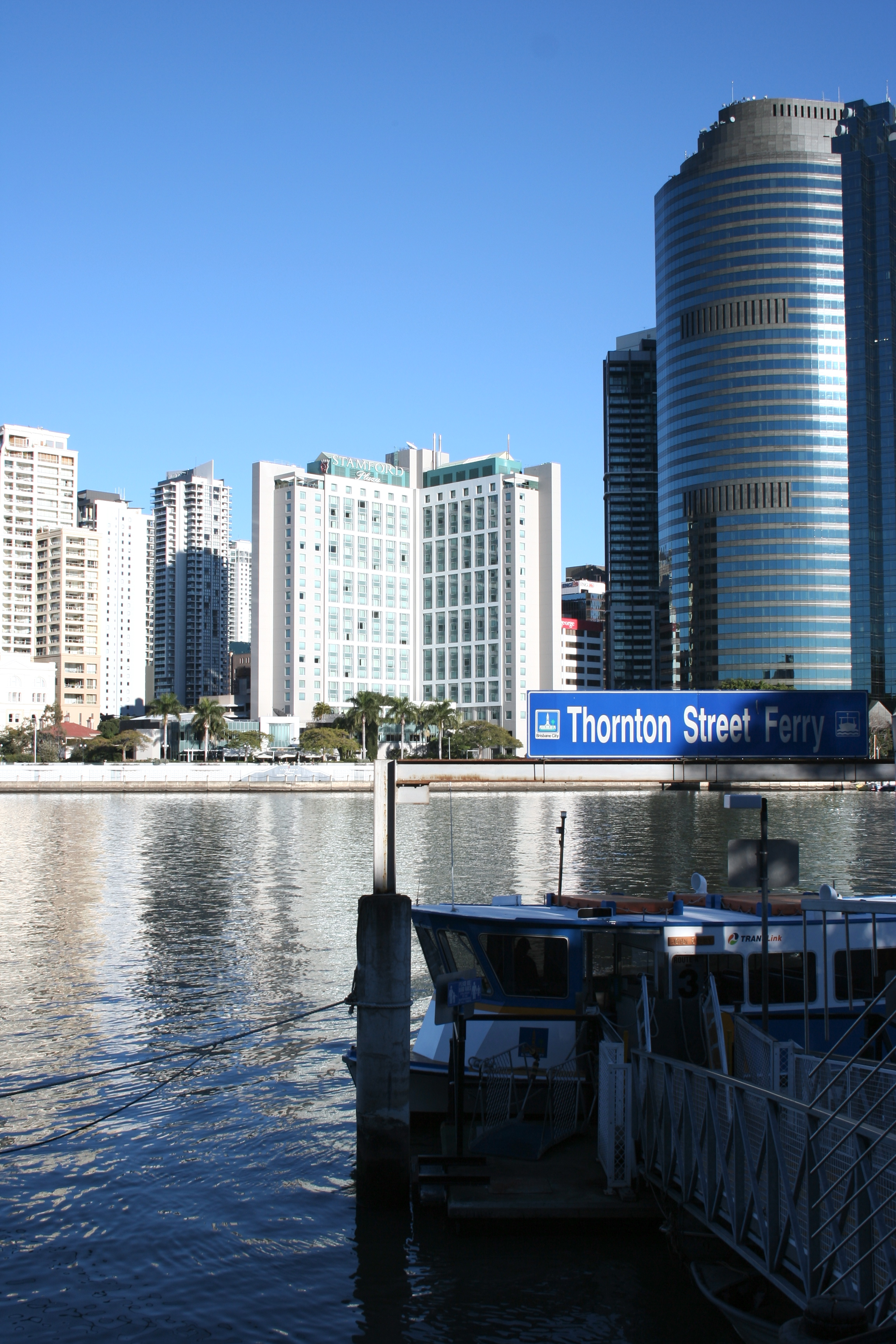
A CityFerry service picking up passengers from the Thornton Street ferry wharf

Ferry transport in Queensland began on 1 January 1843 at Russell Street with a service across the Brisbane River.

Crossings in the Brisbane central business district and at Bulimba, Dutton Park, Indooroopilly and Moggill were needed for road transport to develop in a growing town. Before the Story and Gateway Bridges were constructed ferries transported vehicles across the river at these locations. Some of the more significant services vital to various communities, include the Daintree River Ferry, services to Thursday Island, Magnetic Island, K'gari/Fraser Island, North Stradbroke Island and other islands in Moreton Bay.

Ferry services in Queensland are regulated by the Department of Transport and Main Roads. Services in Brisbane, including the CityCat are operated by RiverCity Ferries under a contract with Brisbane City Council.

== Department of Transport & Main Roads ==
The Department of Transport and Main Roads (TMR) is the entity responsible for overseeing ferry services in Queensland. The TMR contracts with ferry operators and is responsible for the provision of services between:

- Palm Island and Townsville
- Magnetic Island and Townsville
- Seisia and Thursday Island
- Coochiemudlo Island and Victoria Point
- North Stradbroke Island and Toondah Harbour
- Cleveland
- Redland Bay and the Southern Moreton Bay Islands

Brisbane City Council contracted Transdev Brisbane Ferries to operate Brisbane River ferries until 3 November 2020. As from 4 November 2020, the contract is operated by RiverCity Ferries.

== Queensland Passenger Transport Legislation ==
The legislative framework that enables the TMR to administer the statewide transport system that includes the ferry services is the Transport Operations (Passenger Transport) Act 1994 (the act), Transport Operations (Passenger Transport) Regulation 2005 (the regulation) and Transport Operations (Passenger Transport) Standard 2010 (the standard). The TMR employ terms that are contained within the Transport Operations (Passenger Transport) Act 1994: a ferry can be a ship, boat, barge or hovercraft; a Public Passenger Vehicle is a vehicle used to transport members of the public and a Scheduled Passenger Service is a service —

(a) conducted on a route in accordance with a timetable for the service; or
(b) conducted on a route that forms a circle or loop (commonly called a 'loop service'); or
(c) conducted on a continuous basis between 2 points (commonly called a 'shuttle service'); or
(d) under which the vehicle used may, at the request of individual passengers, deviate from the usual route from time to time (commonly called a 'route deviation service'); or
(e) under which the actual route to be traversed may vary within a corridor or zone at the request of individual passengers each time the service operates (commonly called a 'dial and ride service').

== Department of Transport & Main Roads Regions ==
The TMR is divided into the following administrative regions which, where content is available, form the basis of the remaining information: Central West, Darling Downs, Far North, Fitzroy, Mackay/Whitsunday, Metropolitan, North Coast, North West, Northern, South Coast, South West and Wide Bay–Burnett.

=== Far North ===
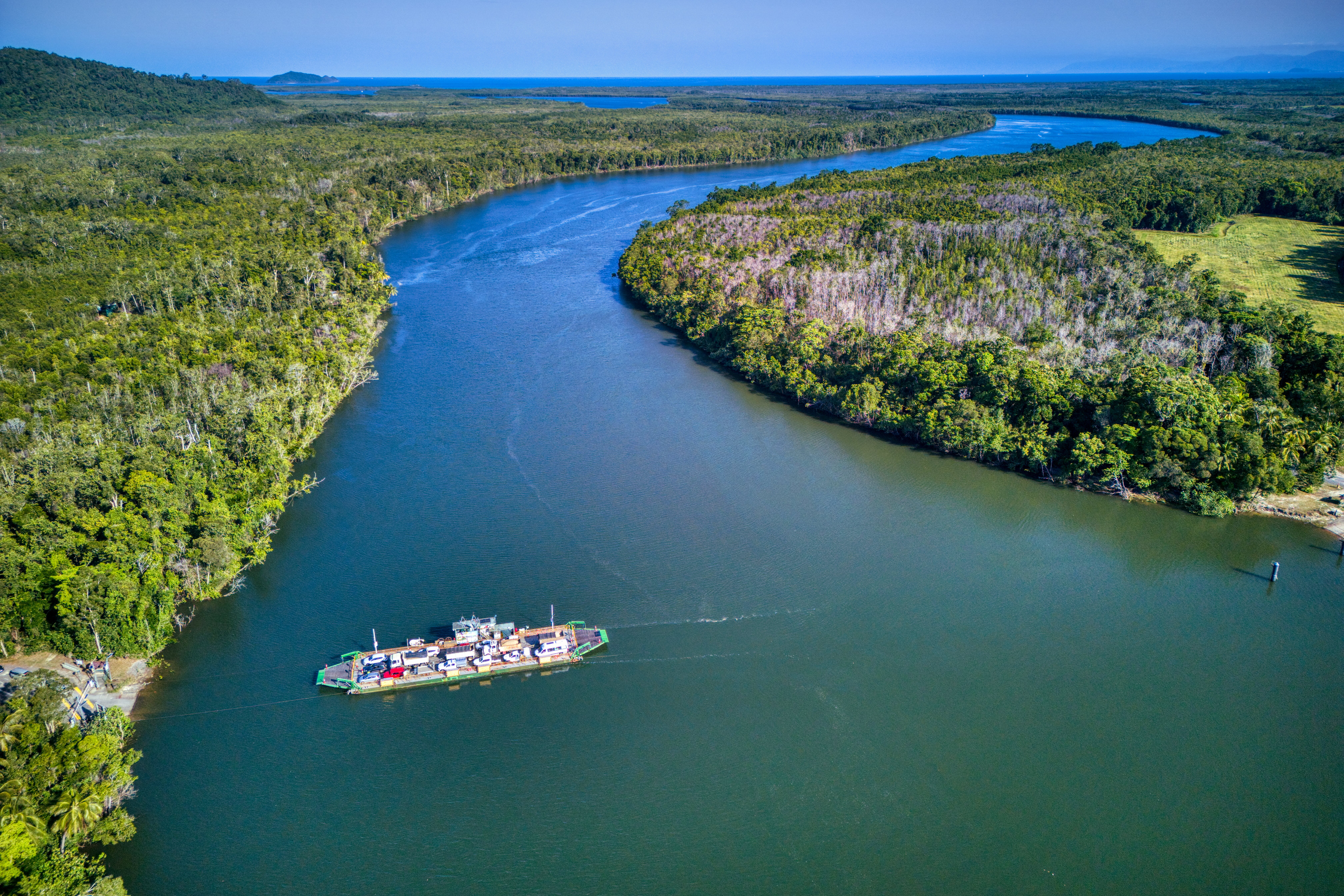
Daintree River Ferry

The Daintree River Ferry is a cable ferry across the Daintree River in Lower Daintree. The ferry is the only cable ferry operating within tropical Australia and its daily hours of operation are between 05:00 and midnight. In July 2003, the Shire of Douglas overturned a motion to investigate the construction of a low-lying single lane bridge with a boom gate and a second ferry across the Daintree. Residents feared a bridge would threaten the rainforest due to a potential increase in traffic. Where as tourist operators stated a bridge would have boosted the local economy. Over the 2011 Easter long weekend, during a period when the ferry was free, tourists using the ferry dramatically increased and resorts were booked out. After Easter local tourism operators expressed a desire for the ferry to be free year-round but their suggestion was ignored. As of 1 July 2024, the cost of a return ticket for private use motor cars and utilities is $51. Limited annual quantities of Daintree ferry concessional travel policy applies to the following people: Douglas Shire Council ratepayers, residents, business operators and employees who work north of the Daintree River and are within the former Douglas Shire area; Queensland Health or Blue Care who travel across the Daintree Ferry in the course of their duties; and Residents of the Wujal Wujal Aboriginal Shire and some Cook Shire Council residents.

Torres Strait ferry services are focused on Thursday Island. Peddell's Ferry has a service from Seisia to Thursday Island. Torres Strait Tours and McDonald Charter Boats both operate ferry services between Thursday Island and Horn Island.

From Cairns, Fitzroy Island, 25 km offshore from Cairns, can be reached by Raging Thunder Ferry Services and Sunlover Reef Cruises Green Island National Park, 27 km offshore from Cairns, can be reached by Big Cat Green Island Reef Cruises.

=== Fitzroy ===
Curtis Ferry Services provide a passenger ferry from Gladstone Marina to Curtis Island and Facing Island.

=== Metropolitan ===
==== Brisbane River ====
A brief description of former passenger and vehicular ferries that serviced the Brisbane River is provided. Proceeded by details of current operational services and networks.

===== History & former ferries =====
In 1838, Brisbane was opened up to free settlers, one of the biggest obstacle to its expansion at the time was the Brisbane River. In February 1842, the first real wave of settlers up the river followed the proclamation of the free settlement of Moreton Bay District. Only a fitful rowboat ferry connected North Brisbane to the more industrial settlement of Kangaroo Point, and another to South Brisbane, which became known particularly for its wayfaring inns. Early settlers crossing the river by row boats often had their horse swimming behind.

In 1844, a service started operating between Customs House and Kangaroo Point. By the 1860s, services operated from Brisbane to Kangaroo Point, Alice Street to Naval Stores and Charlotte Street to Russell Street, Brisbane. Around 1883, the first steam ferry commenced operation between Charlotte Street and Kangaroo Point.

The early ferry services were privately run until Brisbane City Council created by-laws in 1860 governing their operation. By 1893 the council had taken control of all ferry services and leased them out to private operators. In 1925, with the merger of all the local Brisbane councils into the Brisbane City Council, all ferry services from the Moggill Ferry to the mouth of the river came under its control.

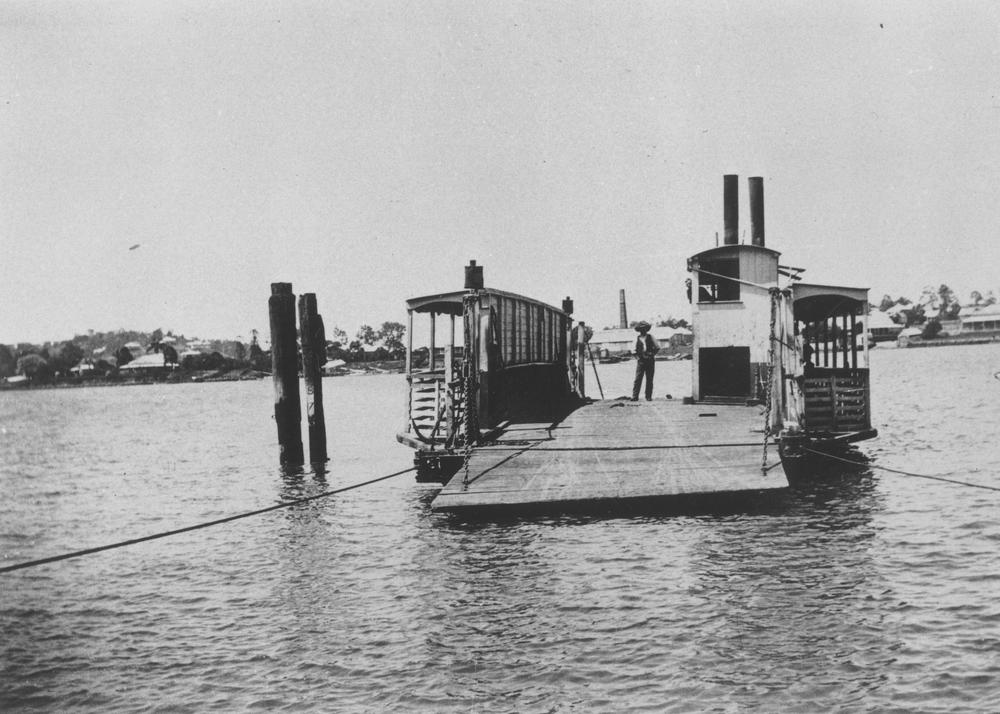
Bulimba Ferry, 1912

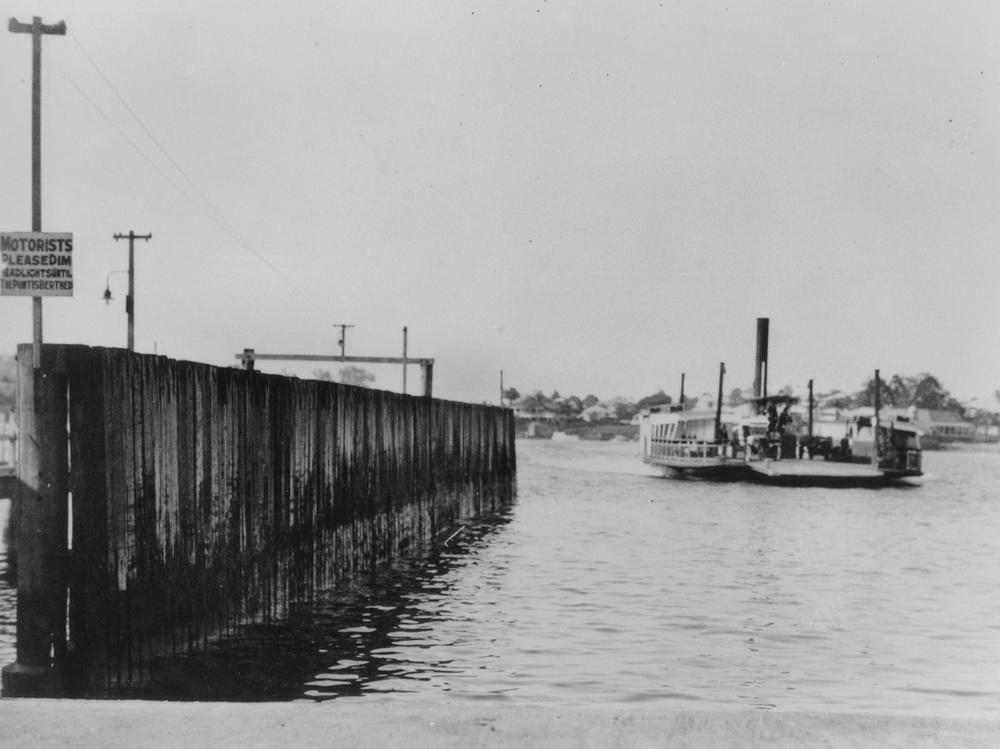
Bulimba vehicular ferry, 1929

Samuel and Matthew Buckley began a row boat service in 1850. Later in 1864 John Watson commenced a vehicular ferry service with the steam paddleboat Advance. The 1893 Brisbane flood saw this transferred to the city with the loss of the Victoria Bridge, a winch and cable punt continued in its place. In 1928 the steam ferry Hetherington enter service and it carried passengers and vehicles, between Bulimba and Teneriffe until its demise in 1952. Bulimba village was served by a vehicular steam ferry (1886), connecting with the Newstead horse-tram service (1888) which was electrified during the late 1890s. A walk down Oxford Street to the ferry remained the sole means of convenient public transport to Brisbane until the 1930s.

The first Dutton Park-to-St Lucia ferry service commenced operation in 1920, with John Cloherty being given a £40 annual subsidy to operate the service. The Brisbane City Council took control of the route and operated its own services from 1925 until 1931 when they resumed leasing the route to private contractors. During World War II the ferry was an important connection to the American Army facilities operating from the Forgan Smith building at the University of Queensland campus at St Lucia (the university did not relocate to the St Lucia campus until after the war). Later that ferry service was discontinued. In 1967, the Dutton Park Ferry became operational again between the University of Queensland and Dutton Park. As a prank, the University of Queensland's Student Union created a petition with approximately 4,000 signatures, largely gathered at the Regatta Hotel, and convinced Lord Mayor Clem Jones of the need for the ferry service. Upon completion of the Pamela Sue ferry the service began in March 1967. Six months after it commenced the number of passengers was well short of expectations. In 1967, the fare was 5 cents, the service had limited running hours and catered for 300 passengers a day. At its highpoint the service had two boats, a fare of $1.40, four captains, serviced 1,900 passengers per day and running hours from 06:30 until 21:55, five days a week. Over the years 3 boats serviced the crossing. The 1974 Brisbane Flood washed away landings and destroyed ferries. The Dutton Park crossing was Brisbane's only wholly privately run ferry service. Its closure occurred on 17 December 2006, when the new Eleanor Schonell Bridge opened. The Pamela Sue ferry (renamed Hamilton) was sold into private ownership for use at Karragarra Island but ended up in storage at Thornlands. In 2020 the University of Queensland acquired and restored the ferry and put it on display (out of the water) at the St Lucia campus. Another of the ferries which operated the service, the Vicky-Lynn, was privately restored by a university staff member who uses it as a pleasure craft on Moreton Bay.

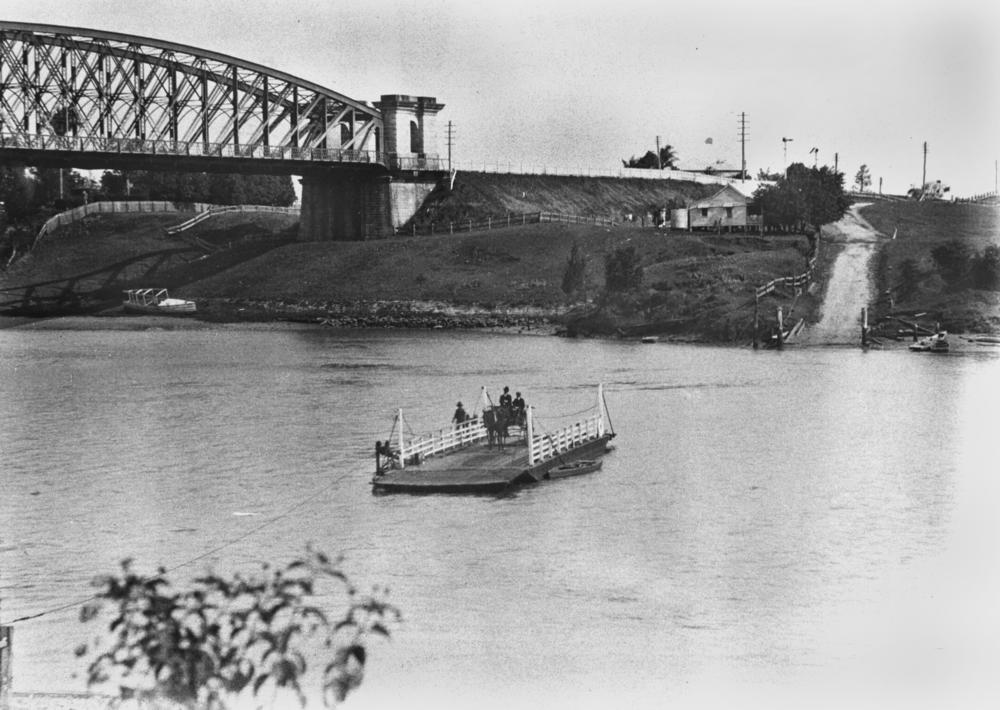
Indooroopilly ferry, 1906

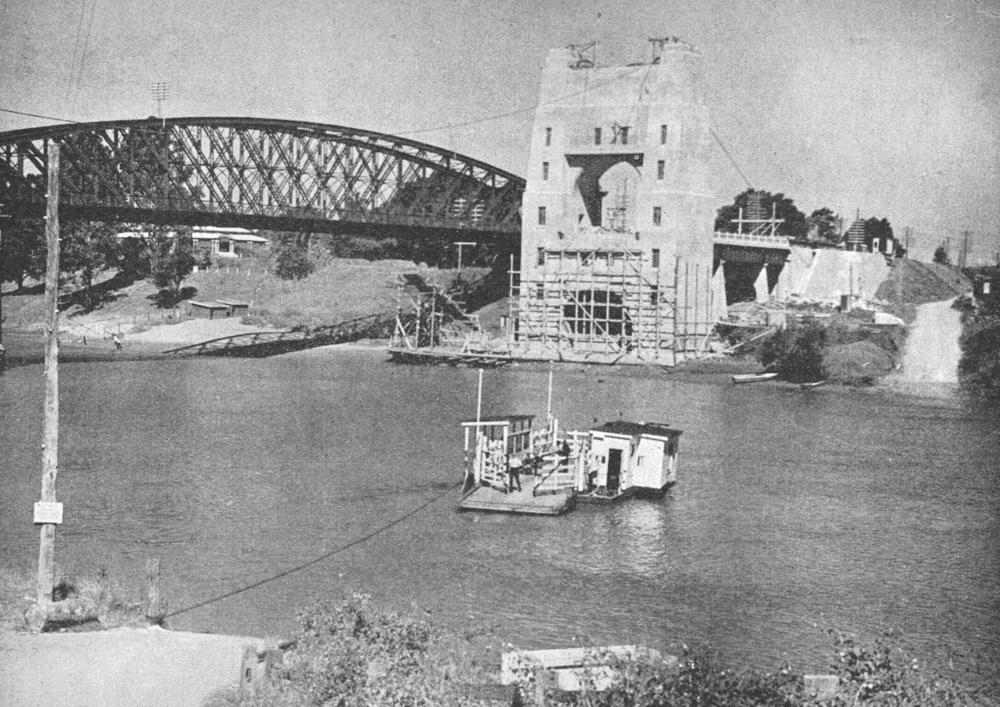
Indooroopilly ferry, 1935

Travellers between Ipswich and Brisbane, prior to the opening of the Indooroopilly rail bridge in 1876, would travel by train to Oxley Point (renamed Riverton in 1888, and replaced by Chelmer Station, just to the south, in 1889), catch the ferry across the river then finish their journey by coach. On 11 June 1891 the ferry service was interrupted as a result of floodwaters. Increasing motor traffic meant the Indooroopilly ferry was perceived as overtaxed and local associations and bodies as far away as Ipswich formed a bridge league, headed by the president of the Graceville progress association, Walter Taylor. They wanted the Chelmer-Indooroopilly ferry service replaced by a road bridge and they won their battle, the ferry continued to operate until the opening of the Walter Taylor Bridge on 14 February 1936.

At Queensport Road, Murarrie was a vehicular ferry named the James Holt that was launched in 1966 by the Lord Mayor Clem Jones who named it after the architect of Brisbane's Story Bridge, Sir James Holt, as he believed that great people should be remembered. The James Holt was built by Evans Deakin for £192,000, was 169' and powered by 3 twin Rolls-Royce diesel marine engines. The ferry was launched on 7 November 1964 by the Lady Mayoress. The ferry's trials were delayed by several months as the propellers did not arrive from Scotland due to a massive fire at the factory. The ferry contract was awarded to Moreton Tug & Barge Company. The James Holt ferry officially went into service on Monday 7 February 1966 at the south bank berth on Queensport Road and was crewed by a complement of three and had deck accommodation to hold up to 36 vehicles. After the completion of the Gateway Bridge on 11 January 1986 the James Holt ferry was no longer needed and it was retired from service. Not long after its retirement as a ferry, it underwent an extensive refit and found a new role as the party boat known as "The Island".

In 1842, with the creation of a by-law John Williams an early Brisbane trader was awarded the contract at 45 pounds a year to operate a ferry service between Russell Street, South Brisbane, and Queen's Wharf, Brisbane, located in the vicinity of the nowadays Queens Wharf Road, Brisbane. It was locally known as the "Time Killer" due to its slowness. After commencing operation in 1843 it went in and out of service as successive Victoria Bridges were built and lost to the waters of the river. In the two references in this section different locations are given for the operation of John Williams' ferry service called the "Time Killer".

===== Moggill Ferry =====
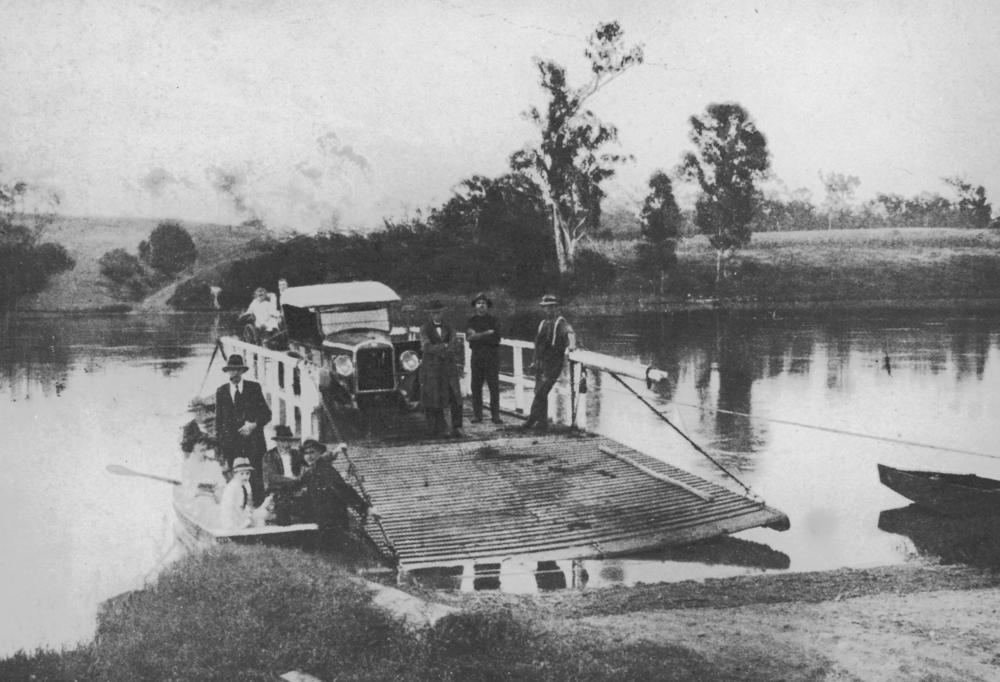
Moggill Ferry, 1928

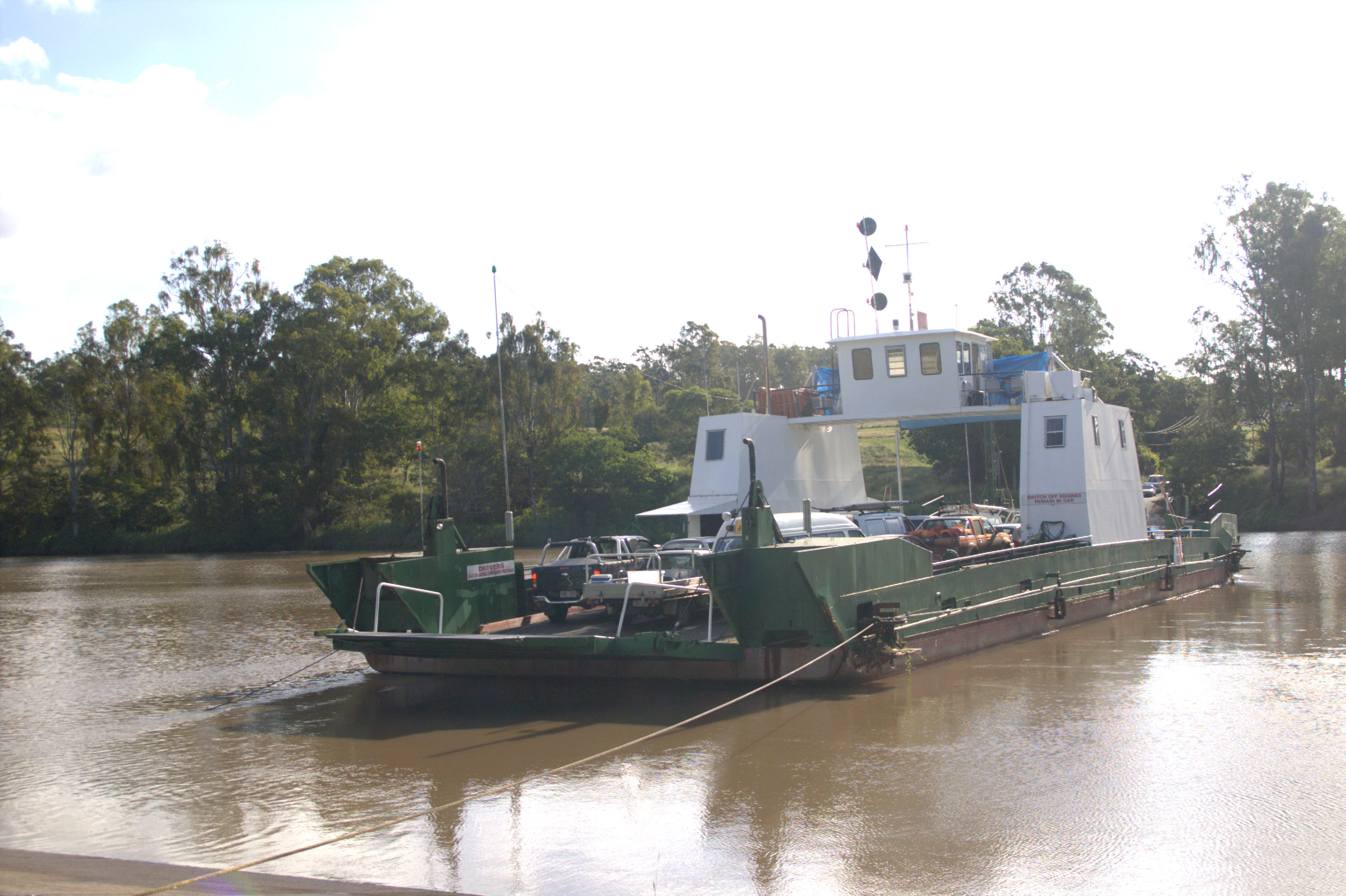
Moggill Ferry, 2008

Moggill Ferry is a cross-river cable ferry operated by Stradbroke Ferries that connects Moggill and Riverview. Henry Stanley was rowing people across the river in 1873. He held the lease, which set the fees for the service from 1881 to 1884. In the 1940s the ferry was motorised under the joint control of the Brisbane and Ipswich City Councils, that ferry which carried four cars at a time is now in the ferry reserve on the Moggill side of the river. Sometime in the 1970s, a 20 vehicle capacity vessel Stradbroke Star formerly on the North Stradbroke Island to Toondah Harbour route and owned by Stradbroke Ferries commenced servicing the crossing.

During the 2010–11 Queensland floods, the ferry broke free from 1 or 2 cable guidelines. The suggestion to sink or demolish the ferry to prevent it becoming a 'missile' was raised during the flood crises until the captain and former skipper managed to secure the vessel to the banks of the Brisbane River with 5 ropes.

===== RiverCity Ferries =====
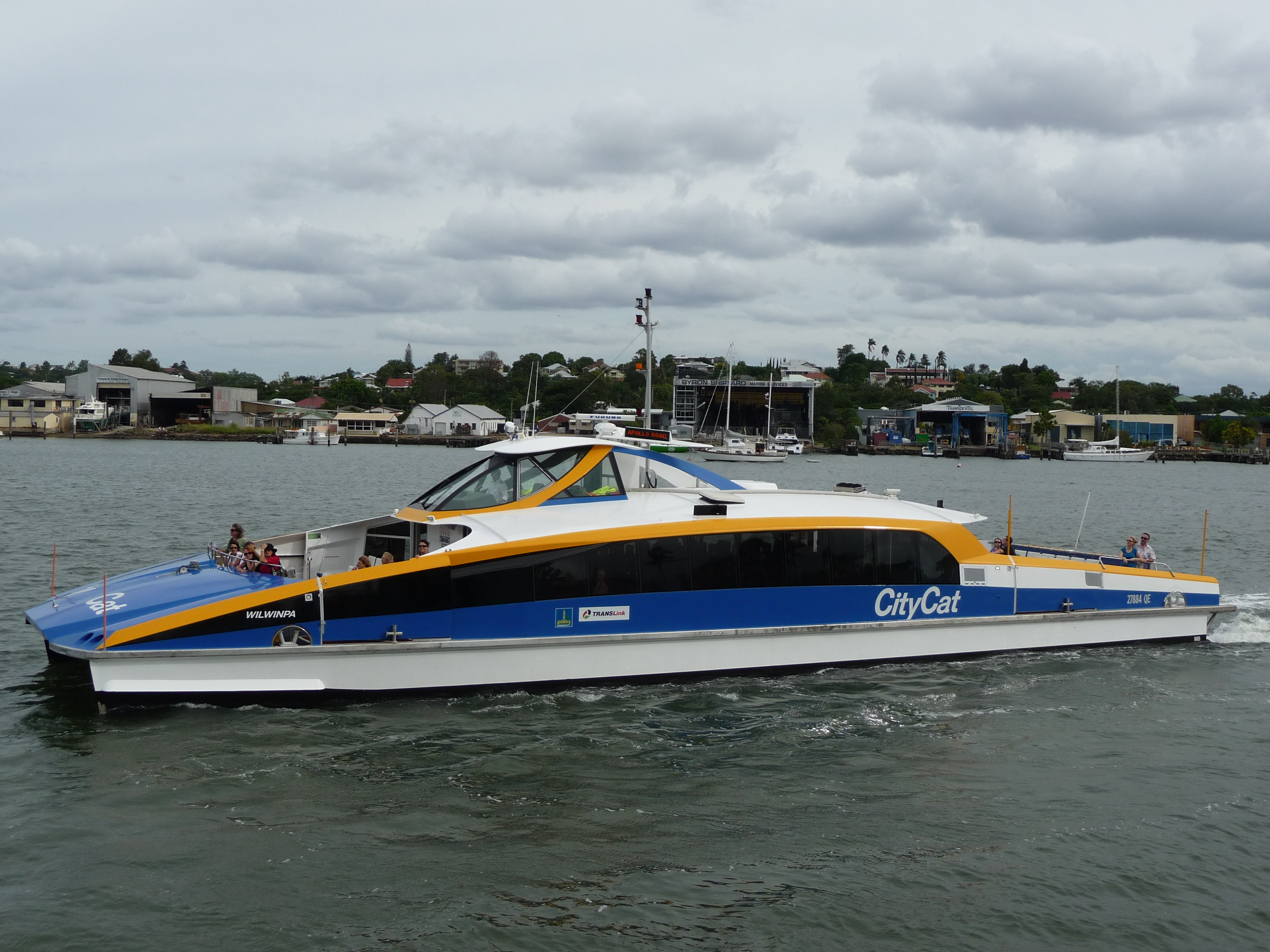
CityCat ferry, 2009

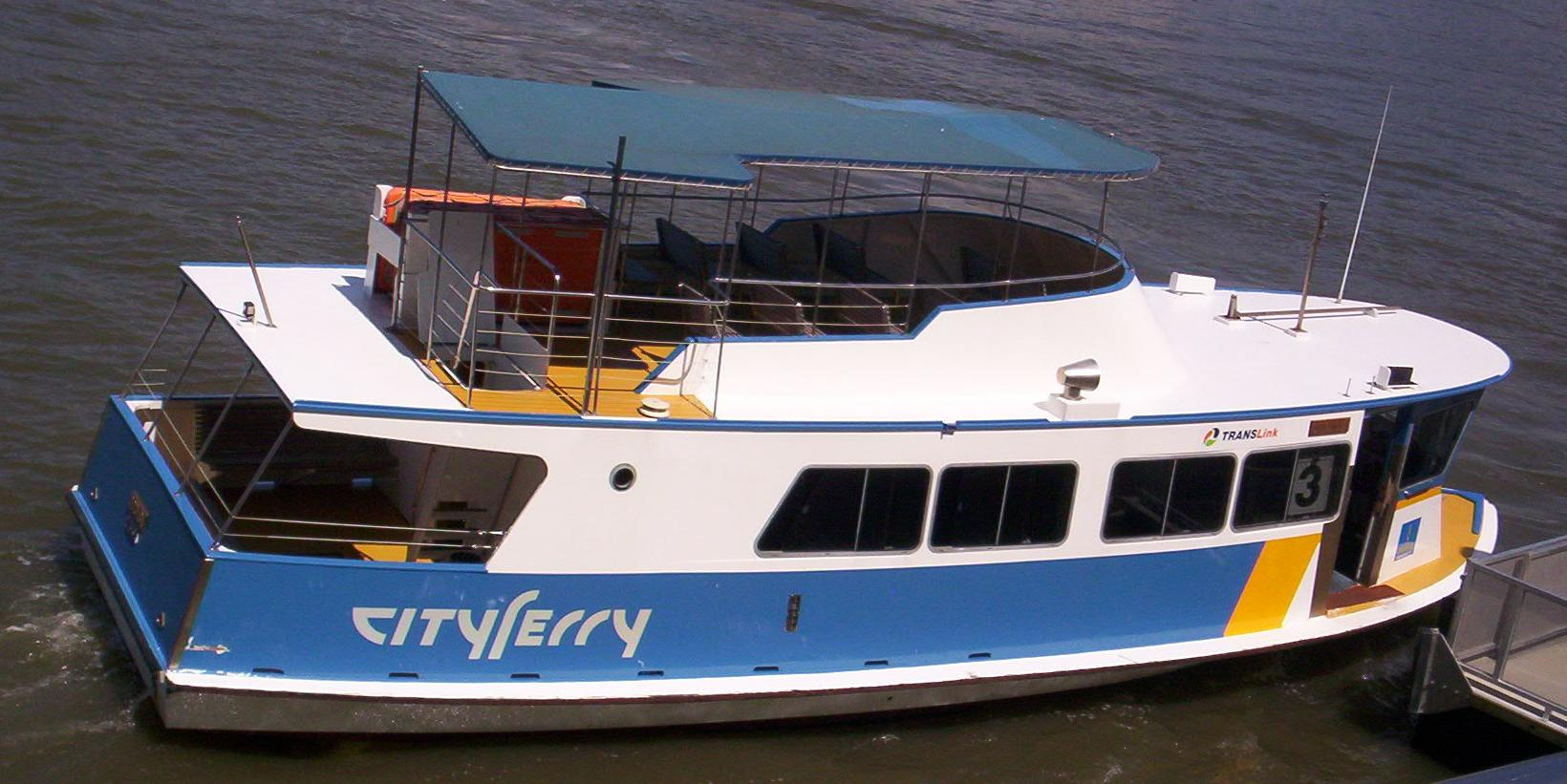
CityFerry, 2006

RiverCity Ferries are contracted by Brisbane City Council to operate a fleet of ferries between the UQ St Lucia and Bulimba. The Brisbane City Council ferry fleet currently consists of CityCats, CityHoppers and CityFerries as well as some leased KittyCats.

The CityCat vessels are named after the Aboriginal place names for various parts of the Brisbane River and adjacent areas. The English name is given in brackets, with the launch date. The entire CityCat fleet has been fitted with WiFi which can be accessed while on board.

The timeline of events leading up to the current arrangements commenced in 1991 when the River Connections contract was awarded by Brisbane City Council for the entire CityFerry fleet. In 1996 the River Connections contract was renewed and expanded to include the new CityCat fleet. In 2003 MetroLink Queensland, which was a joint venture between Transdev and Transfield Services, were awarded a seven year contract to operate and market the CityCat and CityFerry fleets. In 2004 Translink was established to coordinate the integration of the South-East Queensland public transport system which meant they took over the marketing activities of MetroLink Queensland. In 2008 the TransdevTSL Brisbane Ferries brand was established, still within the Translink integrated public transport scheme, when Transfield Services and Transdev ceased the MetroLink Queensland brand.

==== Moreton Bay ====
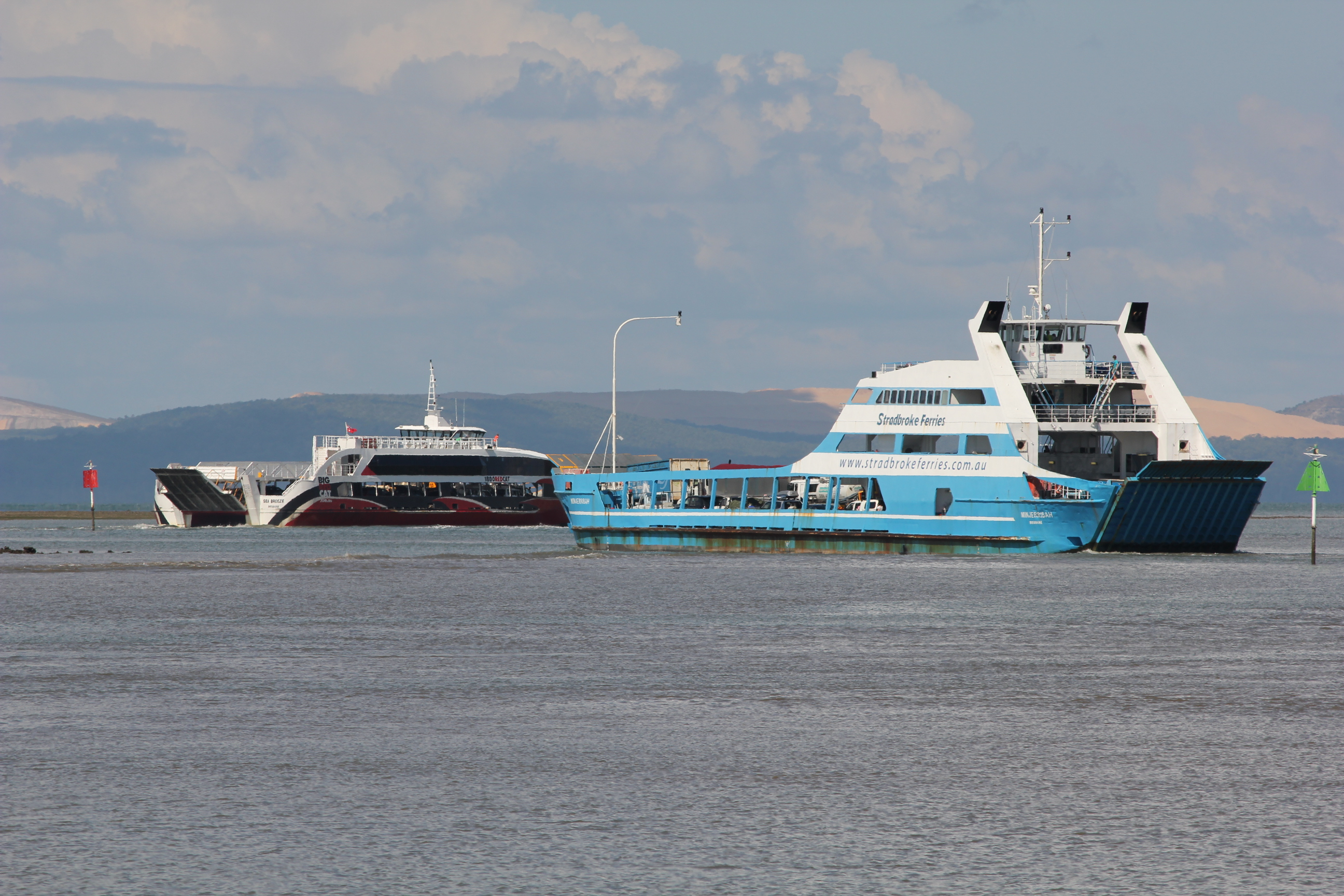
North Stradbroke Island Vehicle Barges

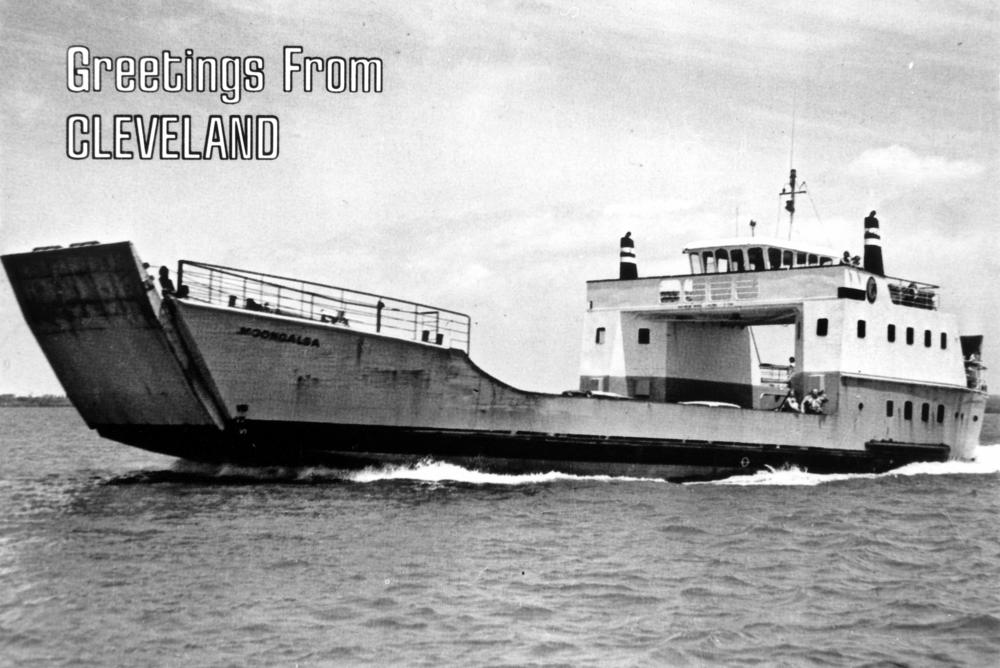
lMoongalba ferry formerly serviced North Stradbroke Island

Services to Moreton Island are provided by Moreton Island Adventures operates a daily 52 vehicle capacity ferry, the Moreton Island MICAT, from the Port of Brisbane to Moreton Island, Tangalooma Wrecks and Bulwer at the northern end of Moreton Island. Also in current operation from the port to the Tangalooma Island Resort are three passenger vessels.

Stradbroke Ferries' Combie Trader barge service from Scarborough in Redcliffe City to Bulwer ceased in July 2008 due to matters with the terminal and landing areas. In December 2009, a passenger-only ferry service was launched by Reality Cruises departing from the Newport Waterways Marina near Scarborough. The service operates Wednesdays to Sundays. On the southern end of the island the settlement of Kooringal which was serviced by a vehicular barge named the Kooringal Trader that ran to Amity Point on North Stradbroke Island until April 2009 when the barge was sold off due to limited business and high operation costs. A new vehicular barge named the Amity Trader now services the same route.

North Stradbroke Island services are provided by Stradbroke Ferries with seven vehicle ferries and one water taxi from Cleveland to North Stradbroke Island and a vehicle ferry service to Lamb, Karragarra, Macleay and Russell Islands from Redland Bay. Gold Cat has three catamaran ferries used to operate a scheduled passenger ferry service from Toondah Harbour to the wharf at One Mile, Dunwich.

Additionally, Transit Systems operated the Big Red Cat, a vehicle ferry from Cleveland to North Stradbroke Island. In 2011 Transit Systems acquired Stradbroke Ferries resulting in a merger of the two vehicle ferry services to North Stradbroke island. The acquisition was reviewed by the Australian Competition & Consumer Commission who advised on 30 November 2011 that it would not oppose the acquisition following an offer of a court enforceable undertaking by Transit Systems. Stradbroke Island Ferries was included in the November 2015 acquisition of Transit System's ferry operations by SeaLink Travel Group. All ferry services to North Stradbroke Island do not belong to the Translink network and thus go cards are not accepted on these services.

Access to Coochiemudlo Island from Victoria Point is either by barge or passenger services operated by Coochiemudlo Island Ferry Service.

The Southern Moreton Bay Islands is serviced by Bay Islands Transit (also owned by SeaLink Travel Group) who provide a frequent foot ferry service. Four fast catamaran vessels run on a loop from Weinam Creek at Redland Bay catamarans to Lamb, Karragarra, Russell, Macleay Islands. These services were added to the TransLink network in 2013 and go cards are now accepted. Additionally, Stradbroke Ferries run three vehicle barge ferries on the same loop during daylight hours.

=== North Coast ===
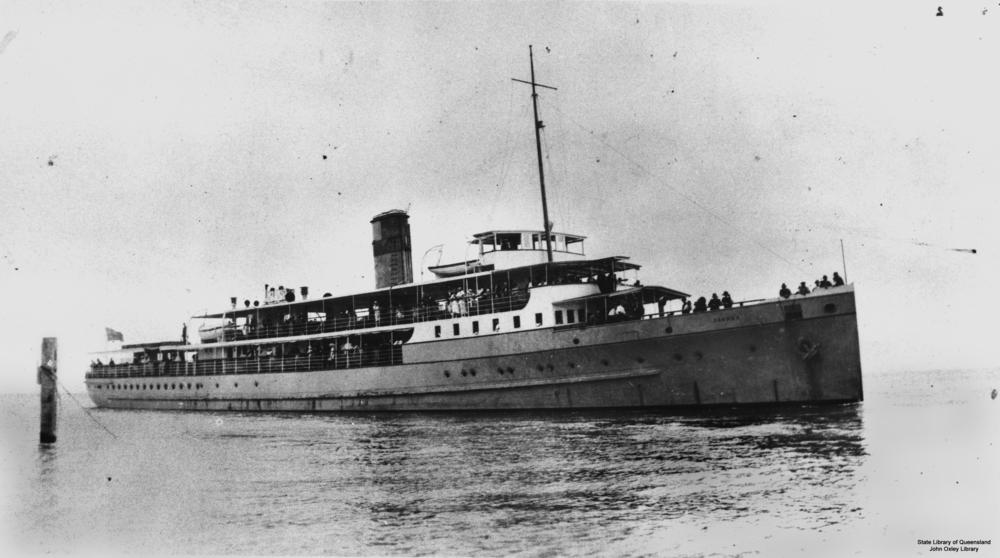
Passenger ferry SS Doomba

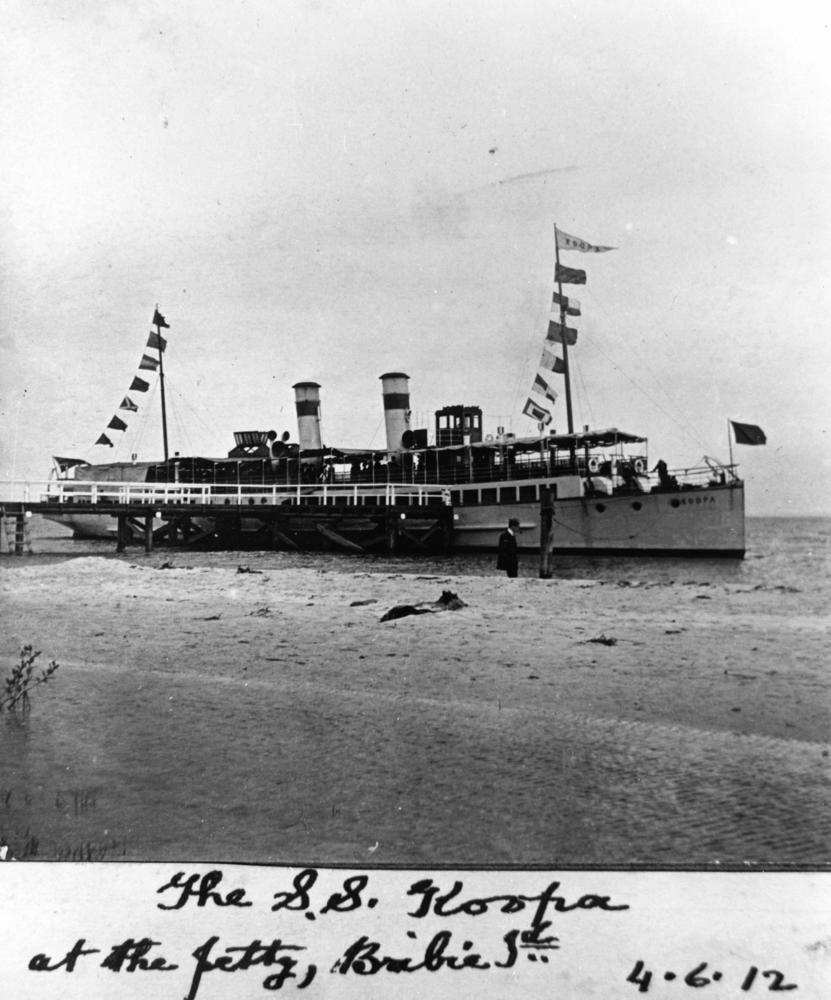
PSS Koopa, Bribie Island, 1912

Bribie Island was first serviced after a jetty was constructed at Bongaree on Bribie Island in 1912, the SS Doomba along with SS Koopa and SS Beaver provided pleasure cruises from Brisbane to the new township of Bribie.

The SS Koopa, often referred to as the Queen of Moreton Bay, was the best known and most loved ship among the many steamers that plied the waters of Moreton Bay from the 1880s until 1953. The SS Koopa also serviced Woody Point and Redcliffe from Brisbane. For thirty-one years Koopa did the Brisbane-Redcliffe-Bribie run carrying thousands of holiday makers. In 1942 Koopa was requisitioned by the Royal Australian Navy and commissioned on 14 September. The Navy made many alterations to the ship which served as a supply ship in New Guinea waters during the remainder of World War II. It was the tender, mother-ship and repair facility for a group of sixteen Fairmile patrol boats. Koopa returned to Brisbane in July 1945 and underwent a major naval refit. After naval service, the ship was returned to the Brisbane Tug and Steamship Company in February 1947. Trips were resumed to Redcliffe and Bribie on Sundays, Tuesdays, Thursdays and Saturday afternoons. In 1952 Koopa was bought by the Moreton Bay Development Company which continued the usual run until her final trip in May 1953. On 3 October 1960 two tugs took Koopa from the Stanley Wharf at South Brisbane to Boggy Creek, Myrtletown. A week later it was moved and placed opposite Bulwer Island where dismantling proceeded.

Services across the Noosa River are provided by the Noosa River Ferries who operate two cable ferries crossing the Noosa River approximately every six minutes at Tewantin. Also, the Noosa Ferry Cruise Company operates a cruise ferry service between Tewantin and Noosa Heads.

=== Northern ===
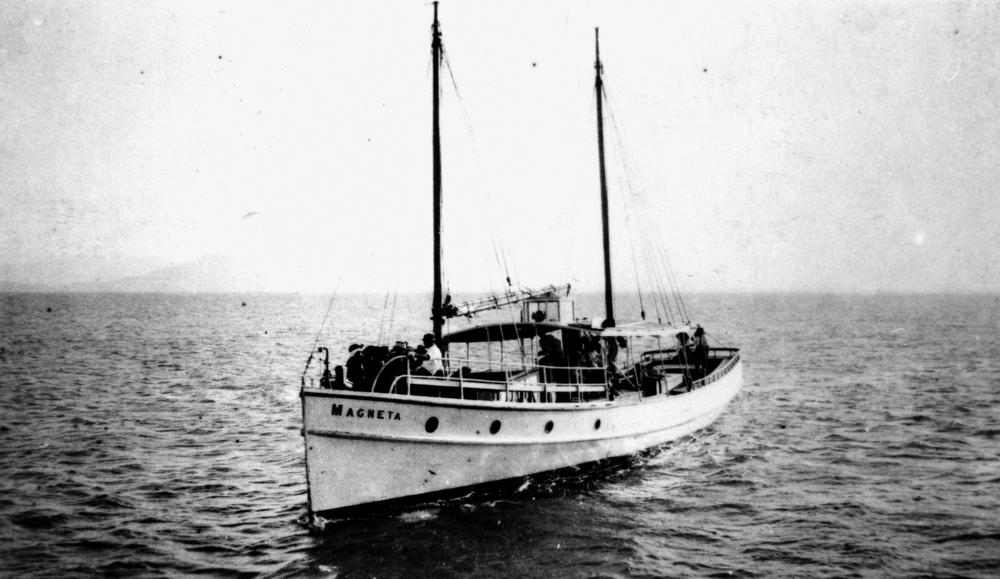
Magneta

Magnetic Island was first serviced in 1899 when a service between Ross Creek and Magnetic Island was commenced by the Hayles Magnetic Island Ferry Service, commenced. As of 2011, Nelly Bay Harbour, Magnetic Island, is served by two companies. Kelsian Group operates passenger catamarans and Fantasea Cruising Magnetic operates a vehicular ferry.

Palm Island is serviced from both Lucinda and Ross Creek. Day & Day Shipping provides passenger and vehicular ferries from Lucinda. Sealink operates passenger catamarans from Ross Creek.

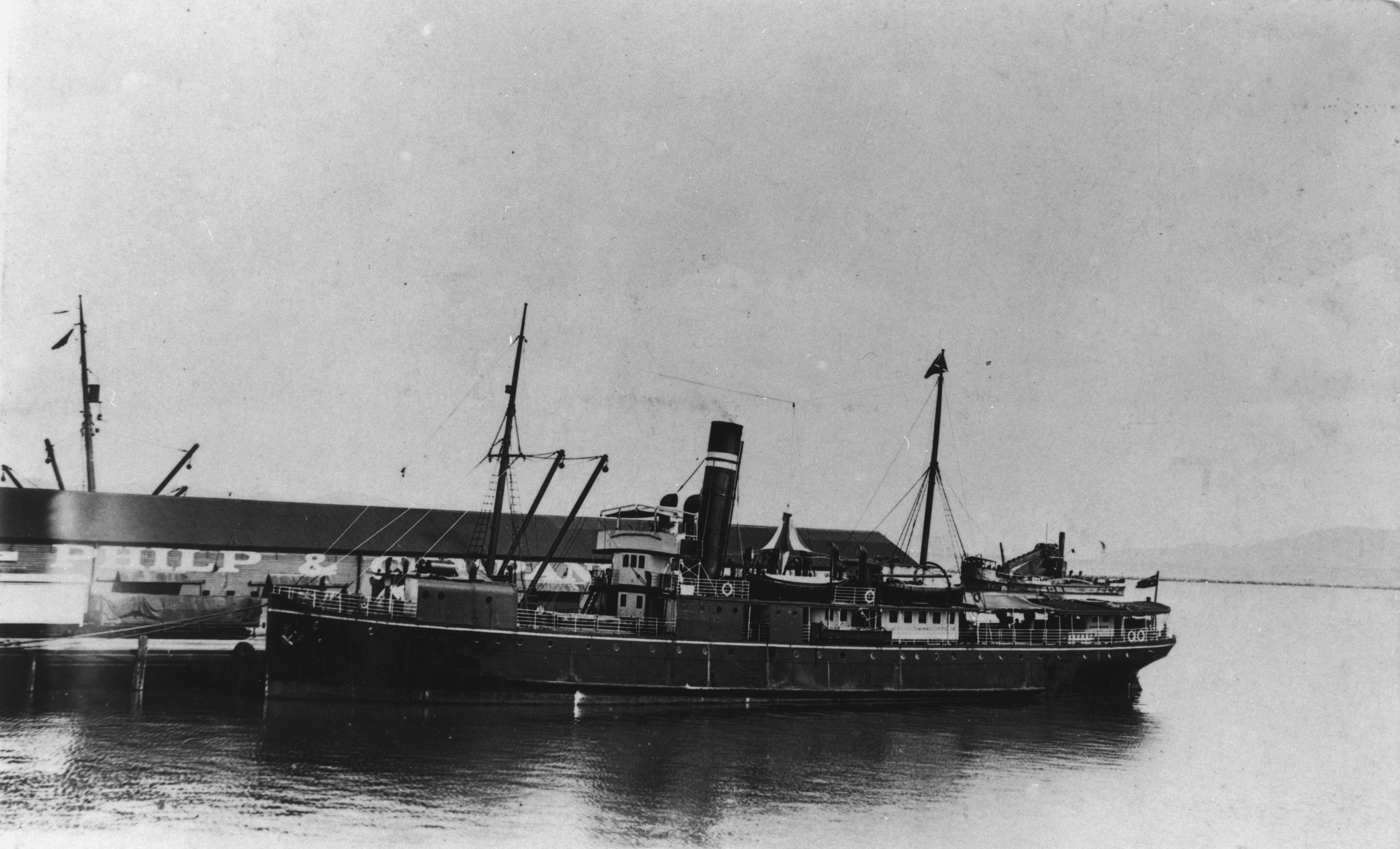
Kuranda, 1923

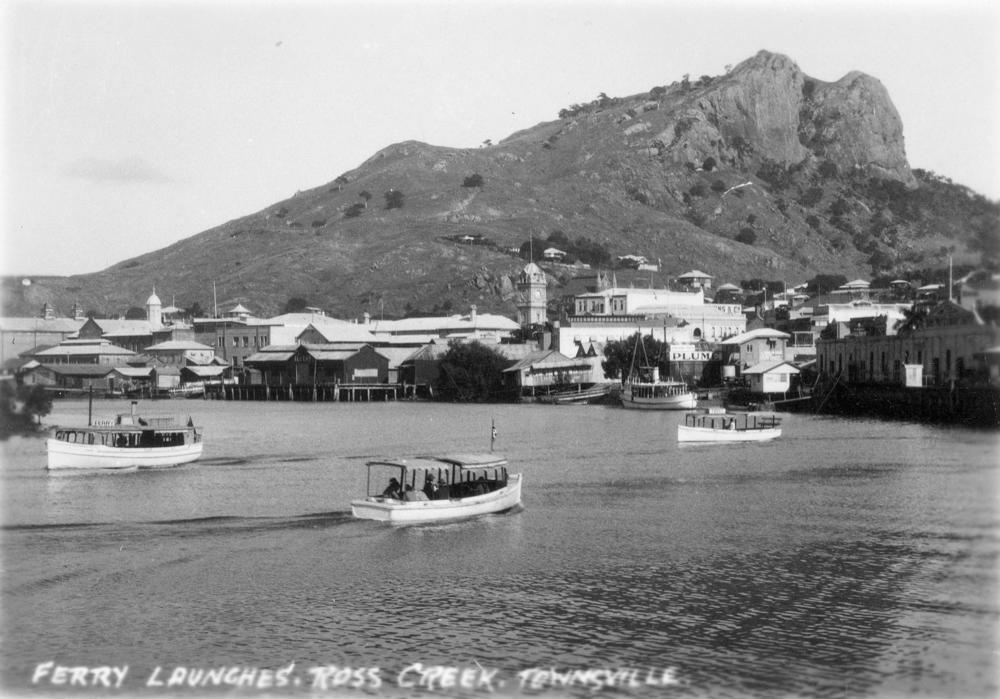
Ross Creek, Townsville

In Townsville until the completion of the Victoria Bridge in 1889, the only passage across Ross Creek was by ferry. First a rowing boat and later a larger vessel was introduced into service as a result of the increase in population. Circa 1923, Kuranda plied between Townsville and Cooktown calling at Palm Island, Lucinda, Mourilyan Harbour, Cairns, Port Douglas and Cooktown. After receiving passengers and mail the vessel left Townsville at 13:00. on Mondays, arriving at Cooktown on Wednesdays. It departed at 16:00 the same day and arrived back in Townsville on Fridays at 16:00 after calling at all ports mentioned.

=== South Coast ===
==== South Stradbroke Island ====
South Stradbroke Island was serviced by Gold Coast Ferries from 2008 until 2011 when a resort closed. A schedule involving a catamaran was provided between Hope Harbour, Gold Coast, to Couran Cove Island Resort .

==== Logan River ====
The following information relates to the pioneering days of crossing the Logan River by ferry at several locations. Ferries were vital for the local communities leading up to and beyond the opening of the first bridge at Waterford on 15 August 1876 – ferries were required for extensive as replacement bridges were being built. The first bridge wa after intensive lobby by the communities of Waterford and Beenleigh.

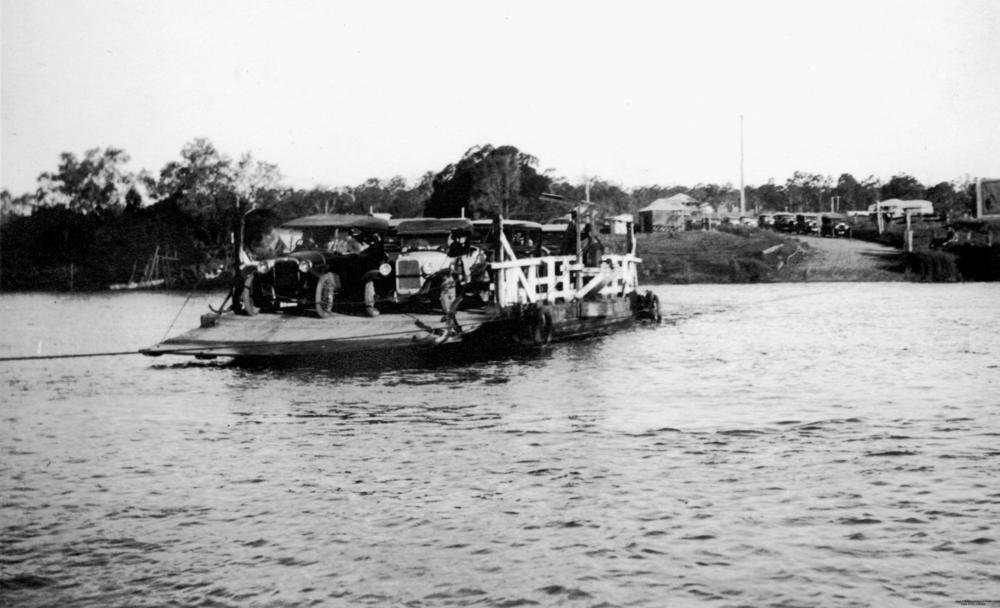
Logan River Ferry, 1930

The earliest crossing of the Logan River at Waterford was Waterman's Punt which was an unofficial ferry service established by Samuel Waterman circa 1862 at the end of Tygum Road in nowadays Waterford West. In 1863, William Stone took over using a flat-bottomed punt capable of carrying horses and cattle and also had a boat for passengers. In 1865, Henry Eden and William Stone had a dispute which led to Eden proposing to operate an official ferry service under Government regulations which led to Eden became a lessee. In 1871, Eden's successor William Huston was unable to pay his annual lease of £35 and was forced into insolvency. By 1874, there were numerous disruptions relating to poorly maintained punts. In 1947, Waterford was victim to a major flood on Australia Day which resulted in the bridge being washed away and a ferry re-introduced while the construction of the new bridge was completed.

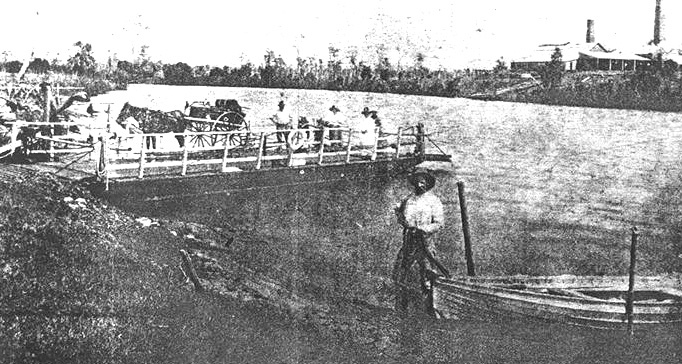
Loganholme Ferry, circa 1890

A Loganholme ferry service operated with a ferry house on the northern bank. People arriving on the southern bank summoned the ferry across by ringing a bell. When the ferry was swept away by a flood in 1873 residents complained that the service was slow to resume and showed no sympathy that the ferry lessee, John McMillan, was unsuccessfully attempting to raise the punt 8 km downstream and an attempt to rent another punt failed. In 1874, minor flooding stopped the service which led to the Land Court at Beenleigh being cancelled because officials were unable to cross.

In 1870 the Alberton Ferry commenced that was used by residents in the Alberton and Carbrook area. Initially it was pulled by hand but was later converted to a winch. It continued to operate until World War II ceasing in 1948. On 5 September 1925 the ferry sunk in about 30 feet of water on the Alberton side of the river due to a large lorry, loaded with 3 tons of manufactured arrowroot from Doherty's Mill in Pimpama, unbalanced the ferry when being rolled onto it. The lorry was unloaded quickly and only one bag or arrowroot was damaged.

=== Wide Bay–Burnett ===
==== K'gari / Fraser Island ====
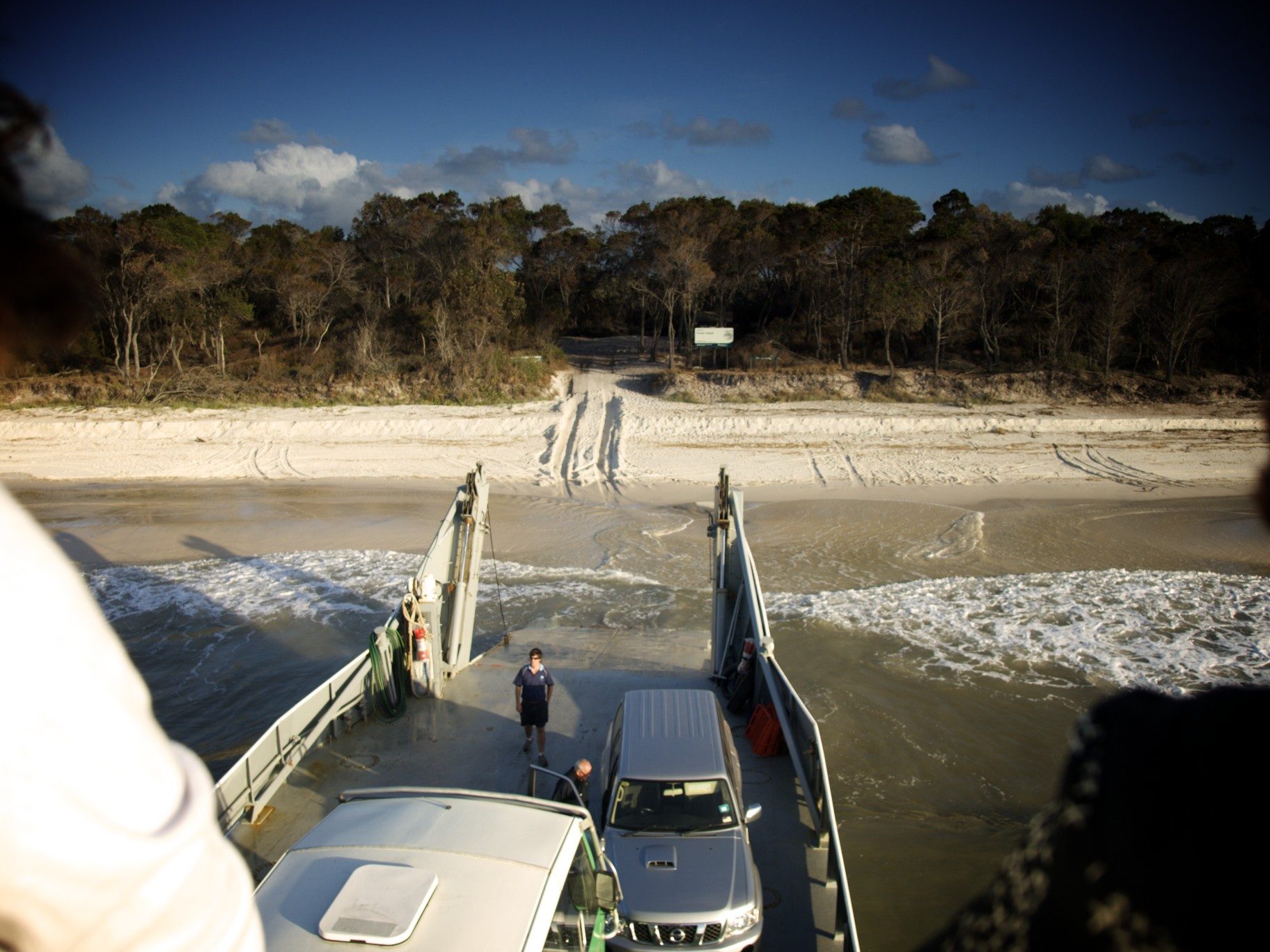
Fraser Island embarkation

In 1969, Gordon Elmer commenced the first regular vehicular ferry to Fraser Island, between Inskip Peninsula and Hook Point. Prior this service it was extremely difficult to land any motor vehicle on the island. In 1970, it is estimated that only 5,000 people visited Fraser Island but by 2003 visitors had grown to 345,000 with 41,000 vehicle permits issued (excluding sand mining operation vehicles). Regular ferry services have boosted tourism visitor numbers.

Barge vehicular ferries provide services between the mainland and K'gari/Fraser Island. Barges depart from: Inskip Point to Hook Point; River Heads to Kingfisher Bay and Wanggoolba Creek; and Hervey Bay to Moon Point. Barges only accept four-wheel drives and walk-on passengers. As of 2010, foot ferries stopped servicing Fraser Island. As of 2011, the names of the ferries that service Fraser Island are barges called the Manta Ray, Rainbow Venture, Fraser Venture, Kingfisher Bay.

== See also ==
- Transport in Brisbane
- Hopo Ferry
