= Toondah Harbour =

Coordinates: 27°32′S 153°17′E

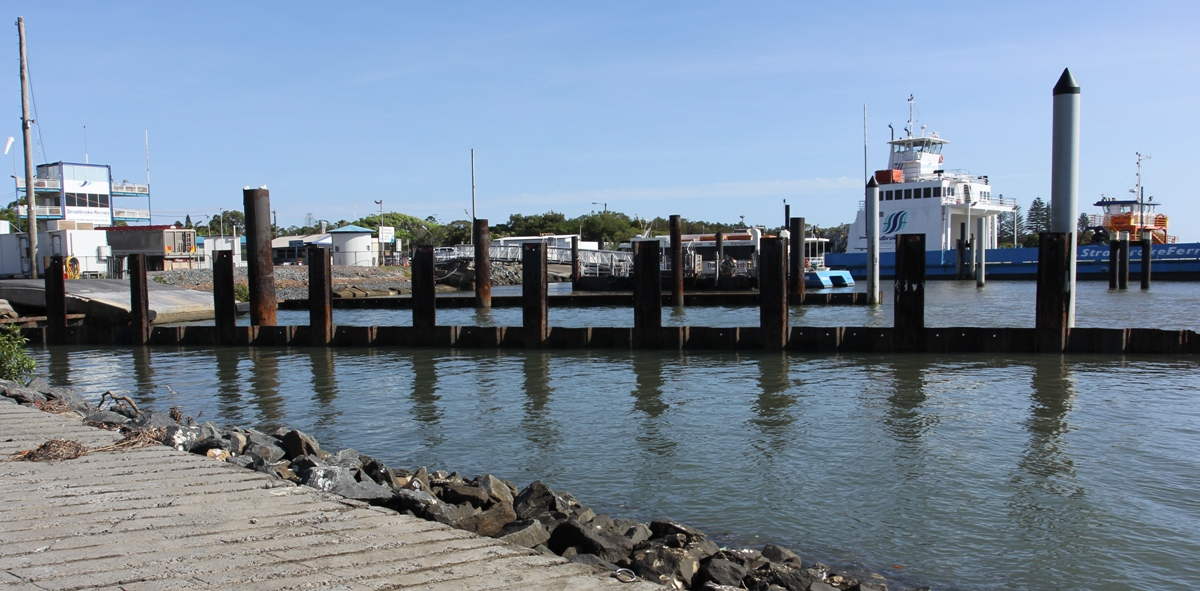
- Toondah Harbour
- Country: Australia
- State: Queensland
- City: Cleveland

Toondah Harbour is a boat harbour at Cleveland in Redland City, Queensland, Australia. It is in southern Moreton Bay. It is the location of the Stradbroke Island Ferry Terminal used by water taxis and vehicular ferries to provide access to North Stradbroke Island.

== History ==
Toondah Harbour is named after a vessel, the steamer "Toondah", which was used to survey and beacon channels in Moreton Bay.

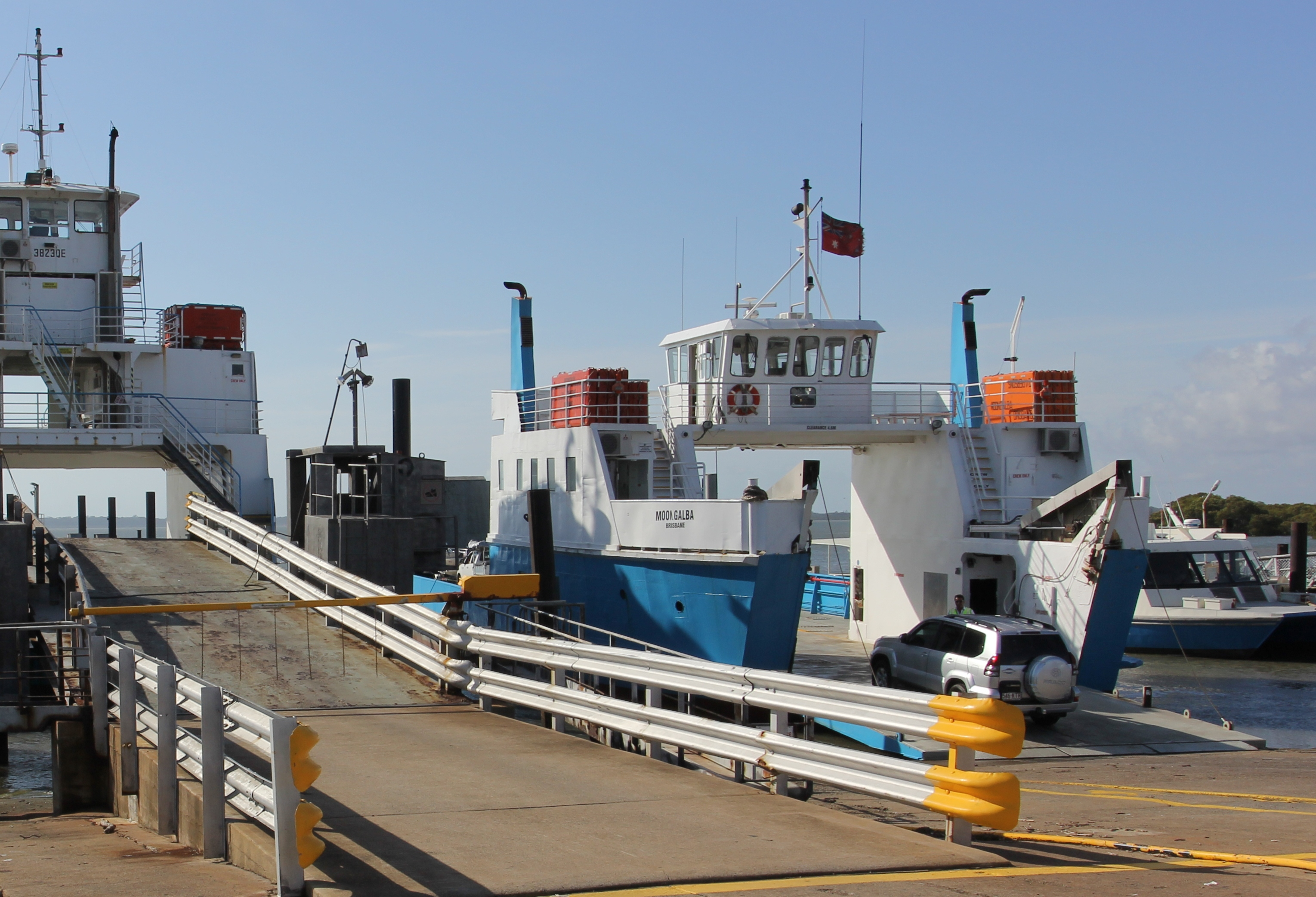
Vehicular ferry at Toondah Harbour

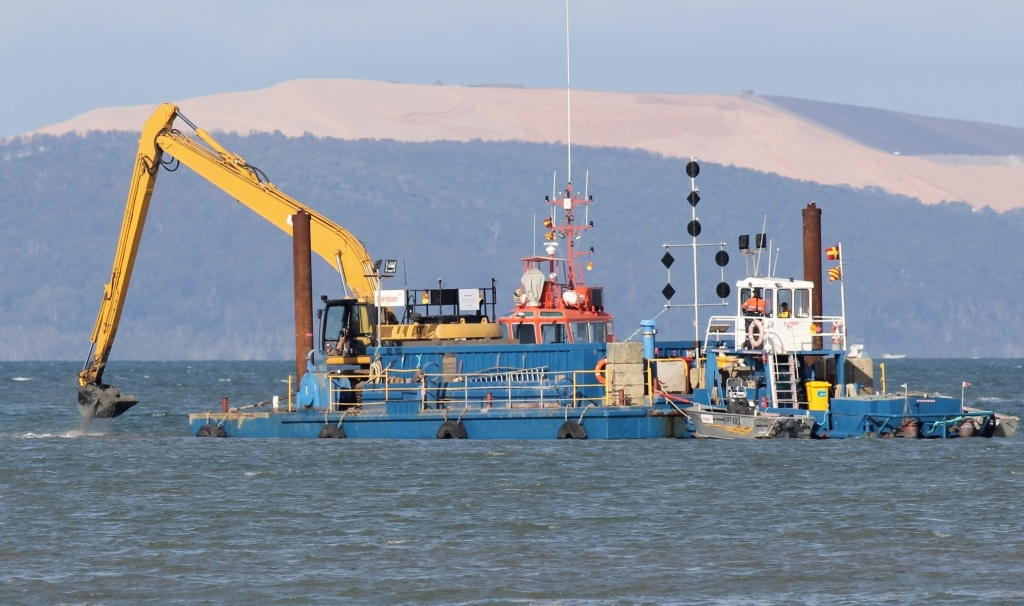
Dredging at Toondah Harbour

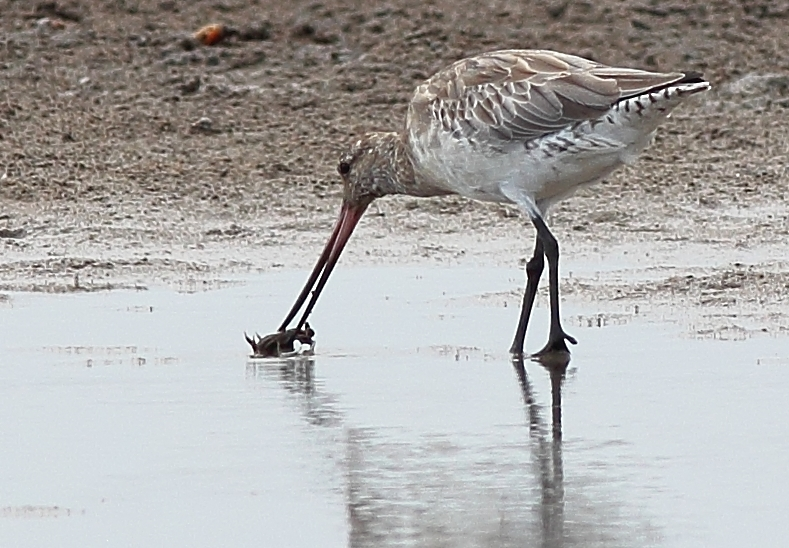
Bar-tailed godwit feeding near Toondah Harbour

== Geography ==
The harbour is situated south of Cleveland Point in an area of coastal wetlands featuring sandbanks, mudflats and mangroves. The area is naturally shallow but the Fison Channel has been dredged to provide access for vehicular ferries which connect Cleveland to Dunwich on North Stradbroke Island.

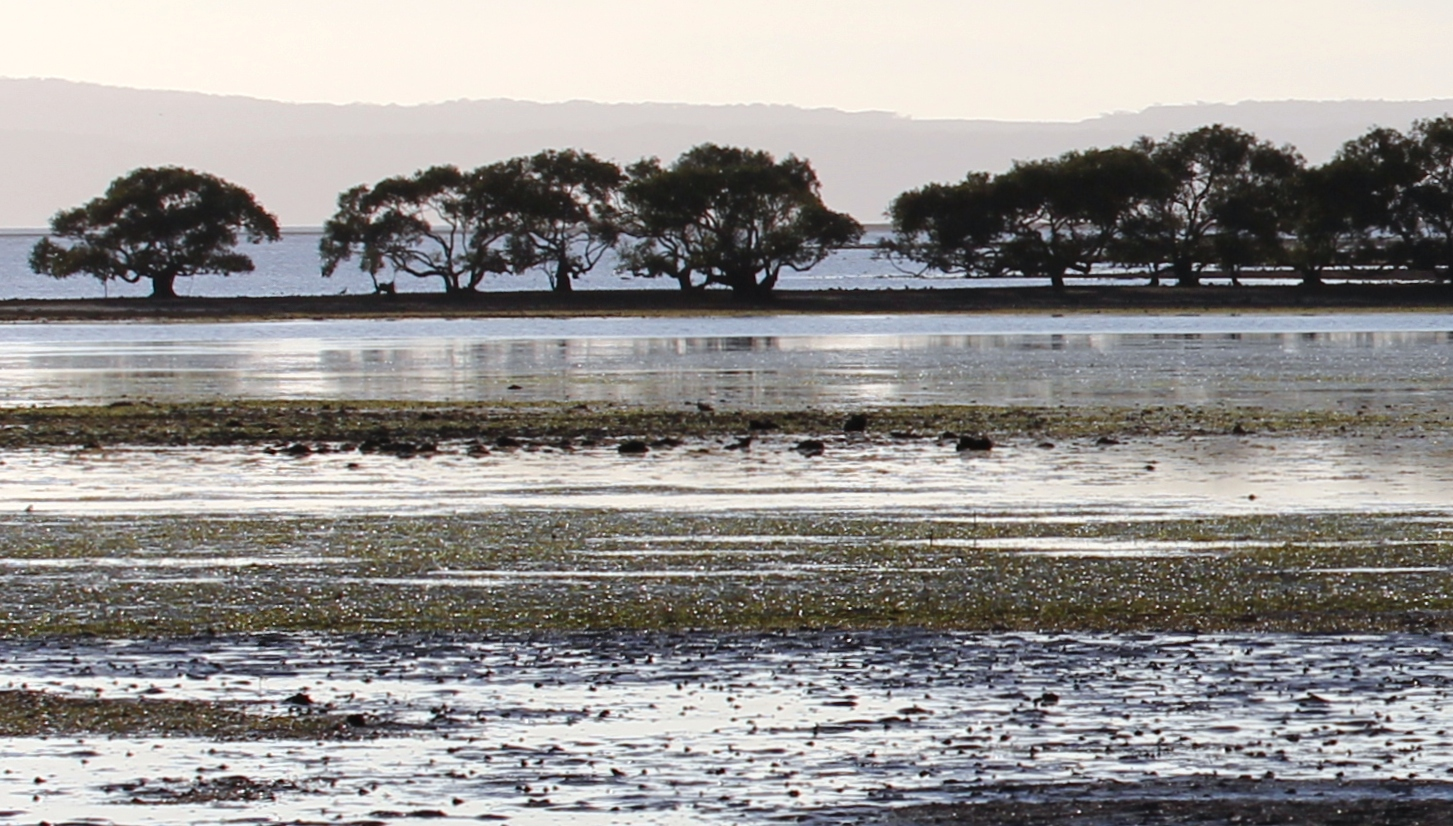
Cassim Island viewed from G.J. Walter Park, Cleveland

Cassim Island, an area of sandbanks and mangroves located to the north of Toondah Harbour, provides shelter from northerly winds. The island is named after William Cassim, an early Cleveland hotel keeper. Cassim Island provides a high value habitat for wading birds and other mangrove fauna.

== Environment ==
The marine and coastal area around the harbour are situated within internationally-significant wetlands, forming part of the Moreton Bay Ramsar site. Tidal flats, mangroves and seagrass beds provide important habitats for fish, crustaceans, green turtles, loggerhead turtles, dugongs, and 43 species of shorebirds, including the vulnerable eastern curlew, the bar-tailed godwit and the grey-tailed tattler. The region is also used by migratory birds as part of the East Asian–Australasian Flyway. Endangered southern right whales have been observed visiting the area annually since 2002.

== Development ==
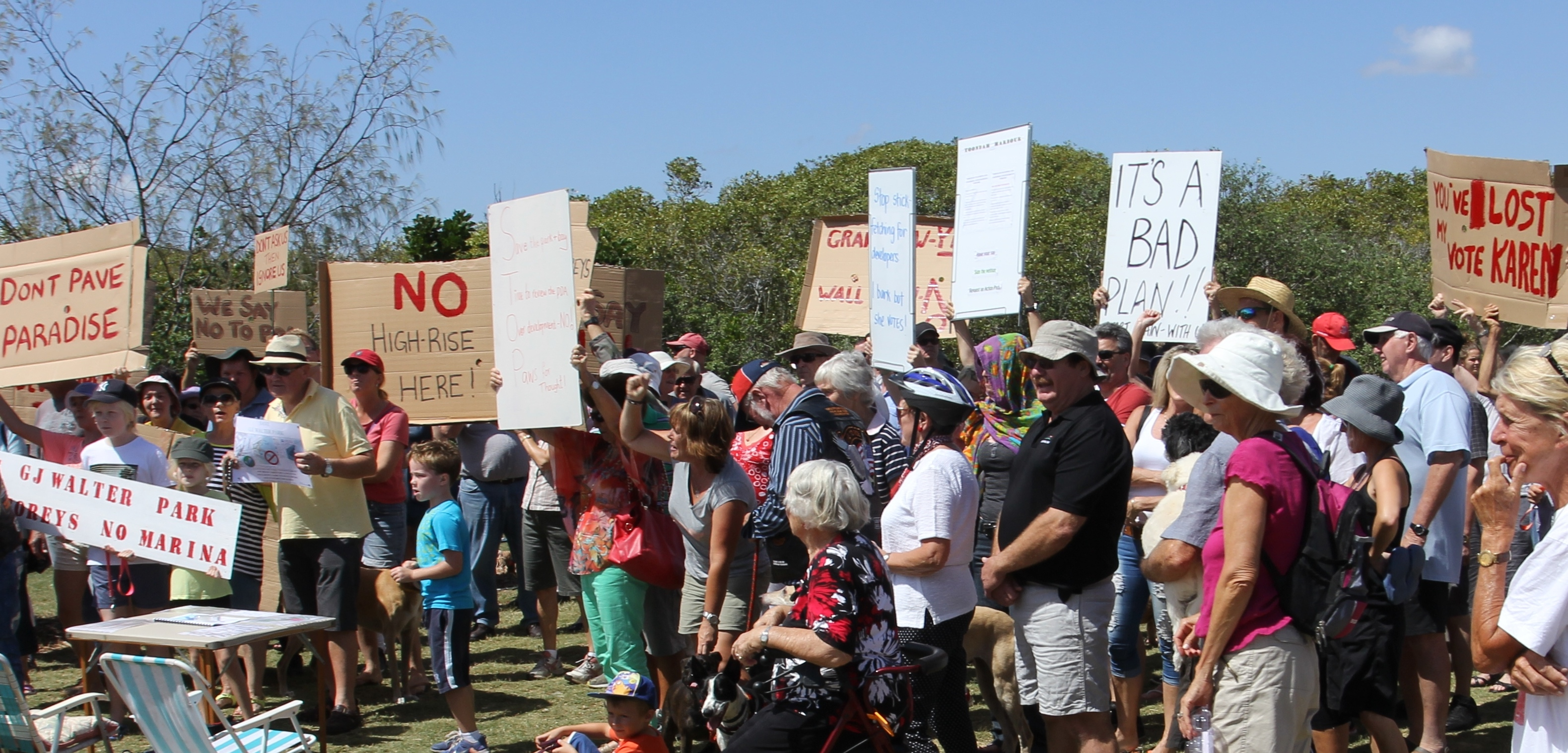
Protest against plans to develop marina and high rise buildings in area around G.J. Walter Park, Cleveland, Queensland

Secret plans for a 400 berth marina, foreshore development and multi-level residential, retail and commercial developments were discussed by the Redland City Council in 2007 under former Mayor Don Secombe.

On 10 January 2014 the Queensland Government released a proposed development scheme for the Toondah Harbour Priority Development Area in Cleveland which would allow development of a large marina up to 800 berths in southern Moreton Bay between Toondah Harbour, G.J. Walter Park and Cassim Island. This proposal has been opposed by marine planning experts and various environmentally concerned community groups including Wildlife Queensland - Bayside Branch.

A number of Queensland architects and planners reviewed the scheme at an Urban Design Workshop. The workshop Convenor said the group found the current Toondah scheme "too large, unfeasible and risky". He said the workshop recommended smaller developments across the city linking Raby Bay with Cleveland's CBD and the ferry terminal. Inclement prevailing winds, traffic bottlenecking, flooding, site pollution, significant environmental complications and native title uncertainty are some of the risks identified for any real estate development in the Toondah Harbour area.

On 23 February approximately 300 people attended a rally to protest against the Government's plans to "carve up" the G.J. Walter Park as part of its Toondah Harbour redevelopment proposal. On 4 March 2014 a petition with 1,211 signatures calling for the Government's plans to be withdrawn was tabled in the Queensland Parliament.

On 19 March the Council decided to ask the Queensland Government to make some changes to the plan which include reducing building heights from 15 storeys to 10 and a 400-berth marina at Toondah Harbour instead of 800 berths. In March 2014 the Government indicated that it was preparing an amended development scheme.

In April 2014 the Redland City Council released copies of various "expert reports" used to prepare the proposed development scheme together with revised artists impressions of the proposed development.

On 31 May 2014 an approved development scheme was released together with a lengthy report on the 583 submissions received during the consultation period.

== See also ==
- Ferry transport in Queensland
- List of ports in Australia
