= Norfolk Island Pine Trees, Cleveland =

Norfolk Island Pine Trees
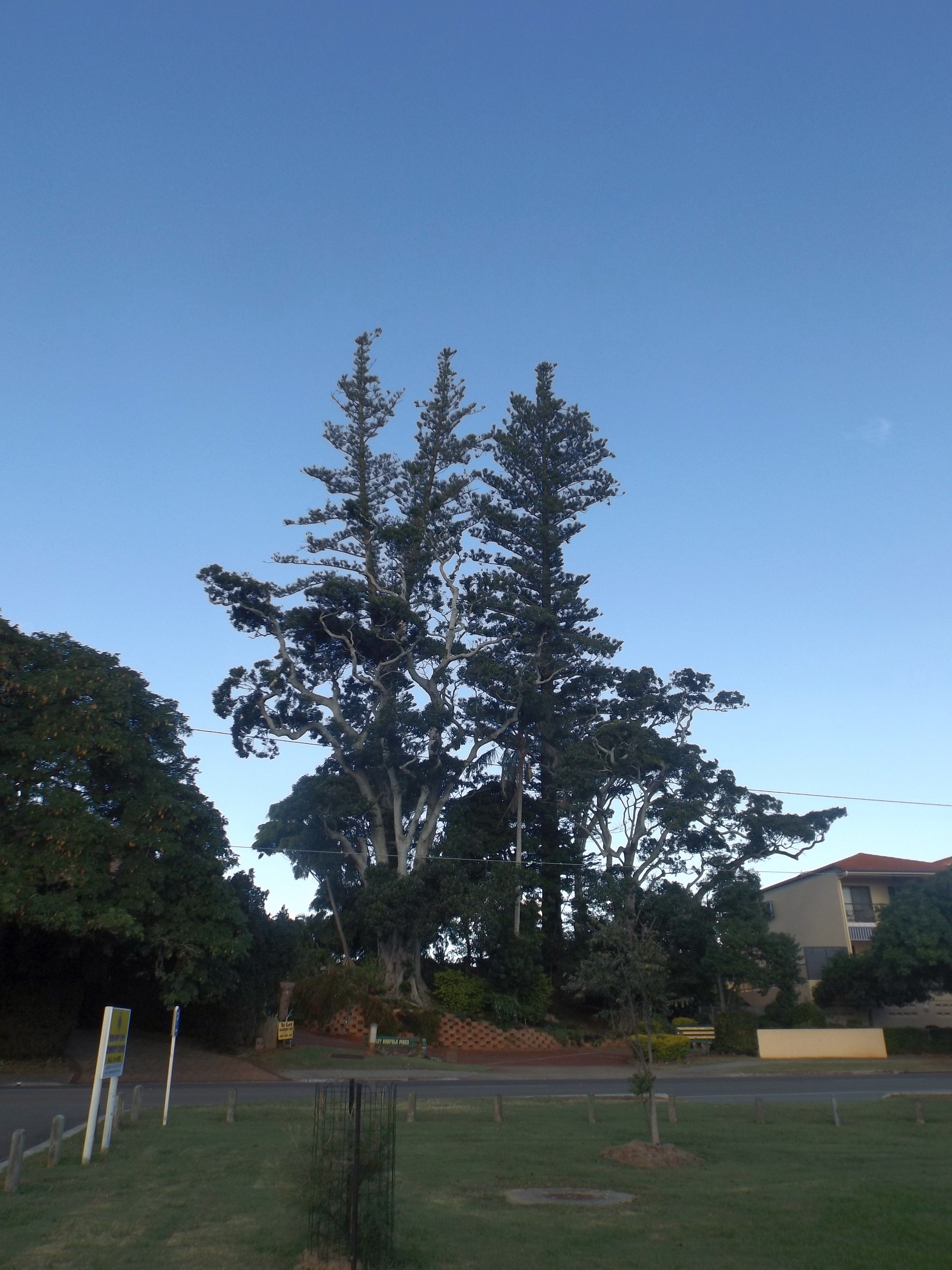
- Trees seen from across the road, 2015

- Location within Queensland Location within Australia
- 27.5208°S 153.2871°E
- Location: 127 Shore Street North, Cleveland, City of Redland, Queensland, Australia

Queensland Heritage Register
- Official name: Norfolk Island Pine Trees
- Type: state heritage (landscape)
- Designated: 21 November 2003
- Reference no.: 602181
- Significant period: 1860s (historical)

The Norfolk Island Pine Trees are a heritage-listed group of trees at 127 Shore Street North, Cleveland, City of Redland, Queensland, Australia. They were added to the Queensland Heritage Register on 21 November 2003.

== History ==
=== Early 19th century ===
The Norfolk Island pine trees at 127 Shore Street North, Cleveland, were planted most likely in the early 1860s by Brisbane Valley squatter Francis Edward Bigge, an enthusiastic promoter of Cleveland as a rival to Brisbane as the state capital. The trees are located on part of allotment 8 of section 6, Town of Cleveland, alienated from the Crown in 1853.

During the 1830s Cleveland was known as Emu Point, a jumping-off point to Dunwich on Stradbroke Island. Despite some early setbacks, Cleveland would eventually become the centre of the developing Redlands district. Pastoral settlement spilt down the range from the Darling Downs into the Brisbane River Valley during the early 1840s. Squatters who took up runs here included young English brothers Frederic William and Francis Edward Bigge at Mount Brisbane, which they established in 1841. Frederic returned to England c. 1850, but Francis remained in Queensland for over thirty years. A member of the New South Wales Legislative Assembly from 1851, and of the Queensland Legislative Council from 1860 to 1873, Francis Bigge was the principal advocate for the establishment of Cleveland as the port for Moreton Bay in the 1840s and 1850s, and held substantial financial interests in the colony. He visited England briefly in the 1850s, where he married in 1857, returning to Moreton Bay in 1858. It is believed that on their return, the Bigges lived mainly at Cleveland, leaving Mt Brisbane in the hands of a manager. By 1868, Francis Bigge had three addresses listed in the Post Office directories: Mr Brisbane Station, Cleveland and Brisbane.

The pastoralists of the Darling Downs and West Moreton adopted Ipswich (then called Limestone) as their main supply centre. However, the squatters' interests at Ipswich ran counter to those who wanted Brisbane as the commercial centre and chief port of the region. Exports such as wool could be transported directly from Ipswich to Cleveland, thus bypassing the convict-tainted Brisbane with its river mouth blocked by a bar. Francis Bigge and other pastoralists invested heavily in the port of Cleveland. One 19th century commentator estimated that Bigge eventually spent £10,000 over two decades in efforts to develop Cleveland into an export outlet.

The Brisbane versus Ipswich (and, by implication, Cleveland) argument was often heated. The Moreton Bay Courier of 14 January 1850 reported an Ipswich public meeting which called for a shift of the port to Cleveland. Francis Bigge thundered: "The ships for Great Britain would receive at Cleveland Point the produce of the country. They would there load their passengers who, as they passed up to Ipswich in the steamers, would give a cheer for dirty Brisbane".

Surveyor James Warner noted in 1841 that Cleveland offered the only apparently eligible site for a maritime township along this shore of Moreton Bay. By 1842 a track linked Cleveland with Coopers Plains, Ipswich and beyond. This may be the track reported to have been marked out by Francis Bigge and Arthur Hodgson of Eton Vale on the Darling Downs. However, it took another decade of squatter agitation for Cleveland to be officially surveyed.

The claims of Ipswich and the squatters were seemingly sunk by the well-known story of the visit to Cleveland by New South Wales Governor George Gipps in 1842, when he was forced to flounder through low-tide mud lying between the Shamrock and the shore. Brisbane offered a most attractive locality elevated upon the riverbank, but was hampered by the river mouth bar and sixteen miles of meandering river. Ipswich, although more easily accessed by the Darling Downs squatters was even further from the Bay. When the Governor became mired in Cleveland's low-tide mudflats, so too were that centre's claims. With the low-tide mudflats regarded as a more serious barrier to ship-borne trade and communications than the bar at the mouth of the Brisbane River, Brisbane gained the upper hand in its desire to become the principal port and the new colony's capital. Bigge and others pressed their claims regardless.

Bigge and others began to develop Cleveland despite a lack of official surveys. In June 1847 the Moreton Bay Courier reported that some private dwellings had been built. In the same year the first light was erected at Cleveland Point to guide shipping, and a stone jetty was completed. In 1849 Bigge built a large brick hotel. Standing empty for some years, it was known as "Bigge's Folly", but today this building (with an additional storey and 'renovated') is now the heritage-listed Grand View Hotel. Although legend has it that Bigge's Folly was erected initially as a private house, other accounts have it purpose-built as a hotel.

In 1849 Bigge, John Balfour of Colinton and other squatters petitioned the New South Wales Governor to survey land already reserved for the Town of Cleveland. This survey was completed in 1850 and a town was proclaimed in December of that year. William Pettigrew noted at the time that: "The talk of late has been about Cleveland ... All eyes are ... set on Cleveland ... A great many of the Sydney people are going to purchase land there as they are sure that Cleveland will become the chief port". At the first auction on 13 August 1851, eighty lots were offered for sale. This land would become the nucleus of the township of Cleveland, officially renamed from Emu Point in July 1851 for the Duke of Cleveland.

At this first land sale a number of Sydney people speculated in Cleveland allotments, including Edmund Tobias of Sydney who purchased several acres. Balfour and Bigge also bought heavily. Balfour's half a dozen allotments comprised over twenty acres, and Bigge purchased (or was a partner in) a dozen allotments totalling some seventeen acres.

=== Late 19th century ===
In 1852 Francis Bigge commissioned John Petrie to erect a store at Cleveland, and by March 1853 exports were expected to commence next boiling season. In 1853 Bigge built accommodation for his employees – the building at the corner of Paxton and Shore Streets later used as a courthouse and now a restaurant (the heritage-listed Old Cleveland Court House). However, the October 1853 sinking of the Countess of Derby when crossing the South Passage on her way to collect a large quantity of wool and tallow from Messrs Robert Graham & Co was a blow to Cleveland. Then fire in January 1854 destroyed the brig Courier and virtually its entire cargo of 400 bales of wool. This second disaster prompted Graham to abandon Cleveland, and move his headquarters to Brisbane. Despite these setbacks some further development continued.

The Moreton Bay Courier of 26 August 1854 reported that "heading from Bigge's Folly towards the point, we passed two other substantial brick cottages ... but both uninhabited". Published in 1859, Rambles at the Antipodes described Cleveland as "one of the most interesting spots in the neighbourhood ... celebrated for some rather abortive attempts at the establishment of a more convenient shipping place than Brisbane itself". Clearly Cleveland's time as potential port or colonial capital had passed, despite the efforts and expenditure by Bigge and others. The writer claimed, possibly erroneously, that Cassim's Hotel was very isolated, the nearest resident being a fellmonger, upon a creek four miles off. It is possible that a number of residences had been abandoned or were used only as summer houses.

An unsourced item probably dating from the early 1870s, held by the Royal Historical Society of Queensland, describes standing on a comparatively high background where there were two hotels and a few small cottages, and from there "a track sloped a short distance ... to the lighthouse ... Descending the slope, the first private dwelling on the right was a good-sized cottage, built and owned by Mr Bigge, who a few years previously had returned to England, whereupon his Cleveland retreat was much in favour with certain Brisbane families".

Francis Bigge occupied the land on which the Norfolk Island Pine trees stand, sometime between 1859 and 1863, if not earlier. The land comprised four allotments originally alienated in 1853: two purchased by Sydney speculator Edmund Tobias (allots 7 & 8, sec 6, Town of Cleveland), and two by Moreton Bay squatter John Balfour (allots 9 & 10, sec 6, Town of Cleveland). Bigge purchased allotments 9 & 10 from Balfour on 31 December 1859. Conveyance of allotments 7 & 8 from Tobias to Francis Edward Bigge of Cleveland was made in October 1863. It is likely that neither Tobias nor Balfour built upon their allotments, but Bigge had erected a house at Cleveland overlooking Moreton Bay by March 1864, apparently on the land he had acquired from Balfour and Tobias.

In March 1869 Bigge applied for a certificate of tile for allotments 9 and 10, by which time he had sold the property to politician and Darling Downs squatter Joshua Peter Bell of Jimbour Station. These two allotments comprised 2 roods 31 perches (2,800 m^{2}) in total, and were valued at £800, suggesting that the property had been improved, and likely contained Bigge's residence. The property at this time was also subject to a lease from 1864 for 7 years, to a Mr Tubbs, but it is not known whether this applied to the whole of allotments 9 and 10. At the same time, Bigge also transferred allotments 7 & 8 to Bell. The total holding then comprised 1 acre (0.40 ha) 1 rood 11 perches (1,300 m^{2}).

JP Bell was one of the most influential men in Queensland, and in the 1870s was a co-founder of the Queensland National Bank. The Cleveland property remained in his ownership, apparently mainly tenanted, until his death in 1881. In 1882 title was transferred to William Finucane, who retained ownership for two-and-a-half decades.

Photographer William Boag travelled Queensland between 1870 and 1878 with his horse-drawn darkroom, undertaking commissions, photographing places across Queensland, and selling prints of "spec" photos. In November 1871 Boag travelled the southern shores of Moreton Bay. Amongst the photographs he took there is one showing a pair of Norfolk Island Pines – juvenile, but well above house height – standing where Shore Street begins to rise as it heads northwards to the Point. These are thought to be the two landmark Norfolk Island Pines on Bell's property. The same photograph shows several other denser trees surrounding the Norfolk Island Pines, which possibly includes the extant fig tree.

=== 20th century ===
A 1906 photograph taken from near the front of Cassim's Cleveland Hotel, looking northwards towards Cleveland Point, shows the Norfolk Island Pines, one already split, towering over the surrounding tall vegetation. Subsequent photographs of the 1910s and later, confirm the pines' local landmark status. These later photographs also clearly show the mature surrounding trees. It seems reasonable to assume, given the maturity of both the pines and adjacent trees in 1906, that it is these trees which were photographed in 1871.

The whole of the Shore Street property subsequently passed to Catherine Byrne in 1906. In 1911 the house and garden on just over 3 roods (33,000 sq ft; 3,000 m^{2}) (allotments 9 & 10 and subdivision 2 of allotment 8 (now BUP103110)) were transferred to the Bernays family, who occupied it until Mrs Bernays' death in 1949. An anonymous chronicler of Cleveland history whose memoirs are kept at the Redlands Library, wrote of how Mrs Bernays had every reason to be proud of her home and its beautiful garden, most of which had been planted by its previous owners. "She always used to tell me that she would never allow the Norfolk Island Pines to be cut down as they were such a guide to boatmen as they came to Black's Jetty at night. She had often been thanked by the men after a wet night as the trees stood out against the background of the Brisbane light glare." Black's Jetty extended into Moreton Bay from behind Cassim's Cleveland Hotel, to the south of Mrs Bernay's property.

These landmark Norfolk Island Pines and their associated trees must be viewed in the context of the efforts by Francis Bigge, Balfour and others, during the 1840s and 1850s, to establish Cleveland as the leading port and export outlet for Darling Downs and Brisbane Valley produce. Already by 1906 the pines had grown to a landmark height, towering over the surrounding vegetation. It is not surprising that throughout the 20th century local mariners used the distinctive pair of trees as navigational guides.

== Description ==
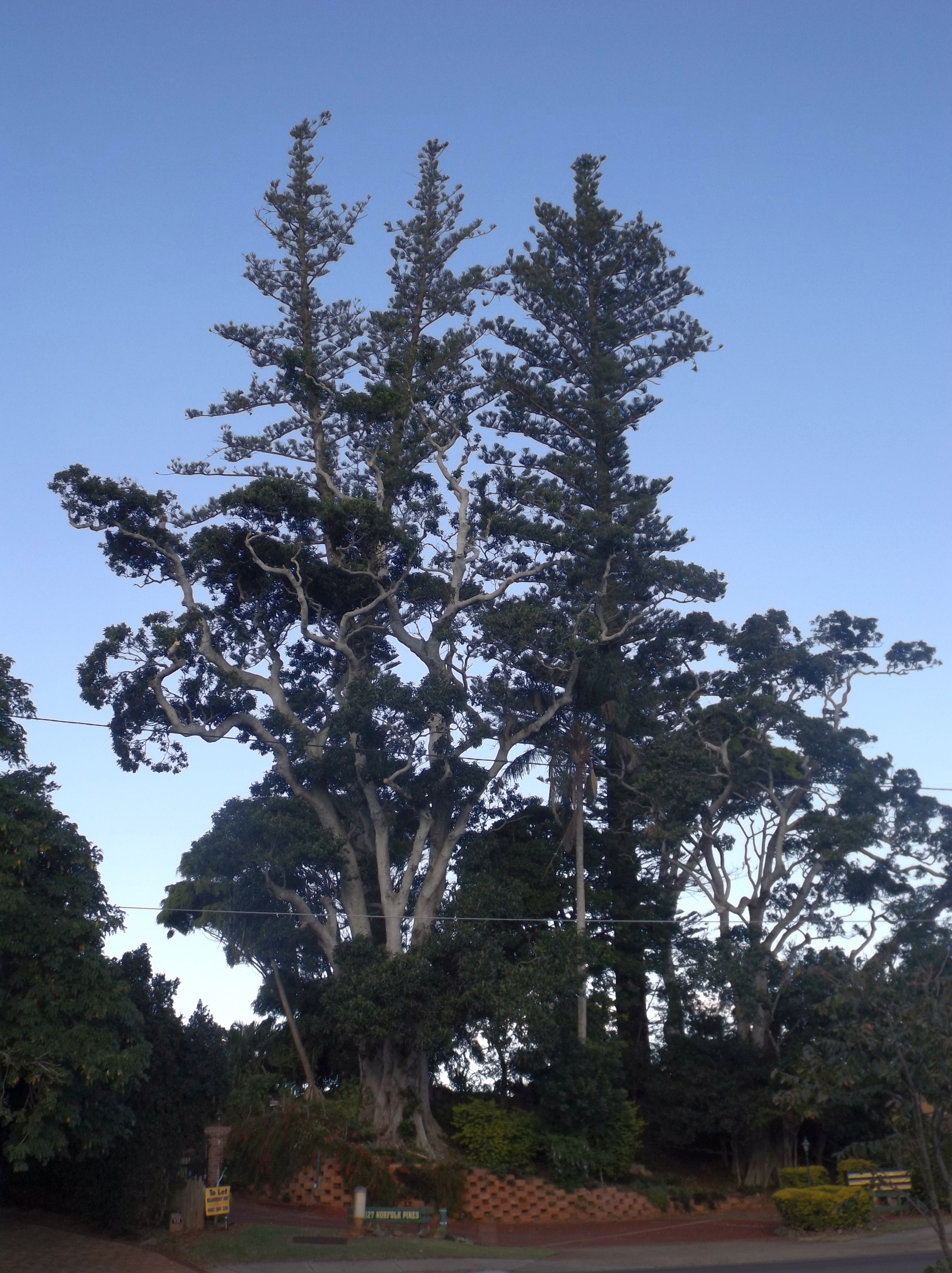
Trees in 2015

The Norfolk Island Pine trees are located at 127 Shore Street North, along the road leading to Cleveland Point, nearly halfway between the former Cleveland Hotel and Paxton Street, on the eastern side of the road. The trees

The maturity of the Norfolk Island Pine trees suggests that they were planted in the 19th century, and photographic and documentary evidence suggests that they are likely to date to the middle of the century, probably planted as a part of the 1860s garden surrounding Francis Bigge's cottage on Shore Street North – the site now occupied by Norfolk Pines home units.

== Heritage listing ==
Norfolk Island Pine Trees was listed on the Queensland Heritage Register on 21 November 2003 having satisfied the following criteria.

The place is important in demonstrating the evolution or pattern of Queensland's history.

The Norfolk pine trees are important because of their association with the evolution or pattern of Queensland's history, in particular the attempts of Brisbane Valley and Darling Downs squatters to establish Cleveland as a port and colonial capital to rival Brisbane.

The place is important because of its aesthetic significance.

The Norfolk Island pine trees have a special significance for the seagoing community of Moreton Bay, as their prominent position has provided a navigational landmark for Moreton Bay sailors throughout the 20th century.

The place has a special association with the life or work of a particular person, group or organisation of importance in Queensland's history.

The trees have a strong association with squatter Francis Edward Bigge, who was prominent in the serious, but failed, mid-19th century attempt to establish Cleveland as the principal port of Moreton Bay.
