= Fernleigh =

Fernleigh may refer to:

== Australia ==
- Fernleigh, Caringbah South, a heritage-listed house in Caringbah South, Sydney, New South Wales
- Fernleigh, Cleveland, a heritage-listed cottage in Brisbane, Queensland
- Fernleigh, New South Wales, a locality in Ballina Shire, New South Wales
- Fernleigh Castle, a historic house in Sydney, New South Wales
- Fernleigh Park, a developed area of Googong, New South Wales
- Fernleigh Track, a multi-use rail trail near Belmont, New South Wales

== Canada ==
- Fernleigh, Nova Scotia, a subdivision within Halifax, Nova Scotia, Canada
- Fernleigh, Ontario, a community in the township of North Frontenac, Ontario, Canada
