= Old Cleveland Police Station =

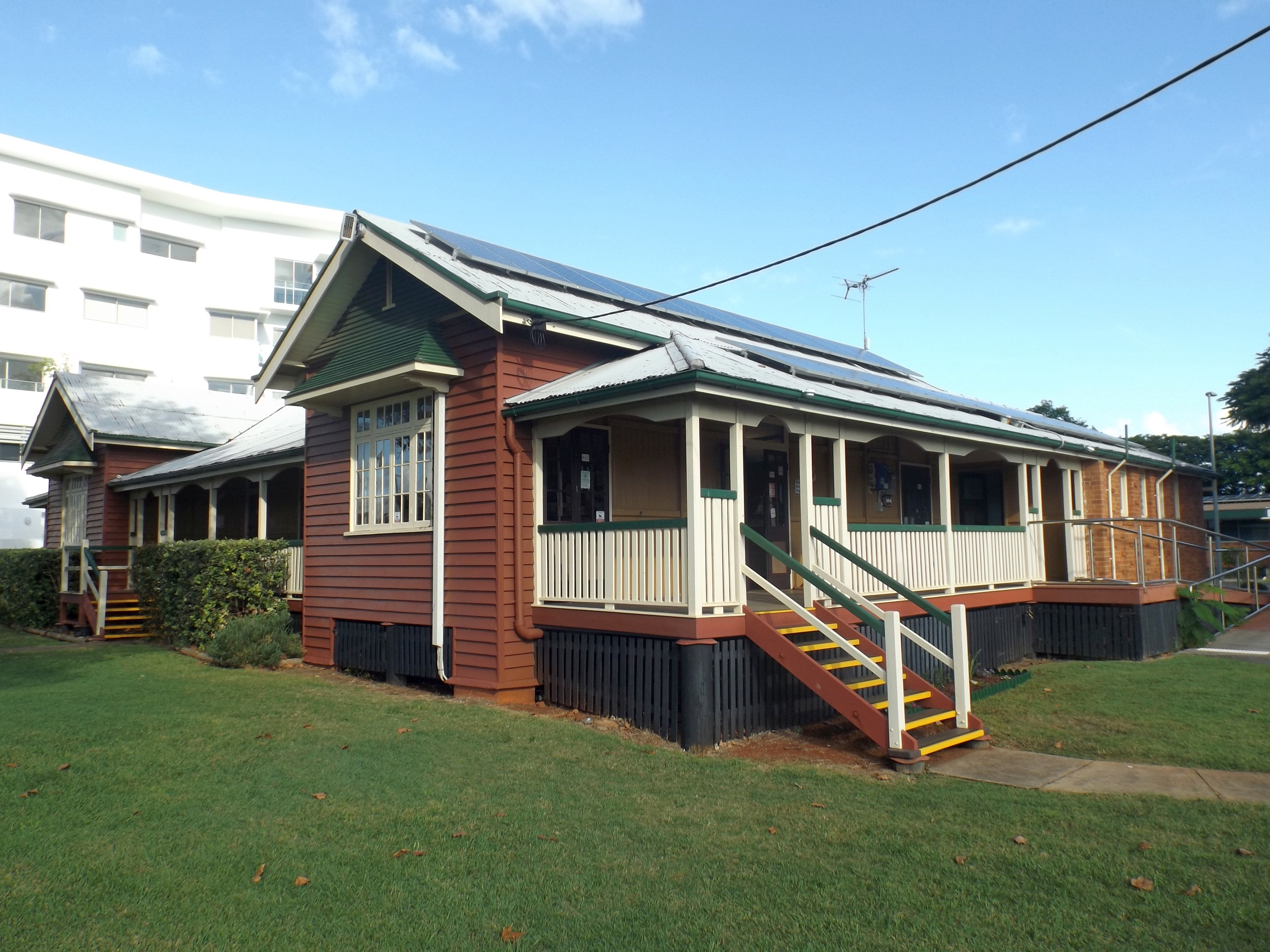
- Building in 2015

- Location within Queensland Location within Australia
- 27.526°S 153.2796°E
- Location: 1 Passage Street, Cleveland, City of Redland, Queensland, Australia

History
- Design period: 1919–1930s (interwar period)
- Built: 1934–1935

Queensland Heritage Register
- Official name: Cleveland Police Station and Court House (former)
- Type: state heritage (built)
- Designated: 26 March 1999
- Reference no.: 601933
- Significant period: 1930s (historical); 1930s (fabric); 1935–1998 (social)
- Significant components: residential accommodation – police sergeant's house/quarters, courthouse, decorative features, police station, watch house

The Old Cleveland Police Station is a heritage-listed police station at 1 Passage Street, Cleveland, City of Redland, Queensland, Australia. It was built from 1934 to 1935. It was added to the Queensland Heritage Register on 26 March 1999.

== History ==
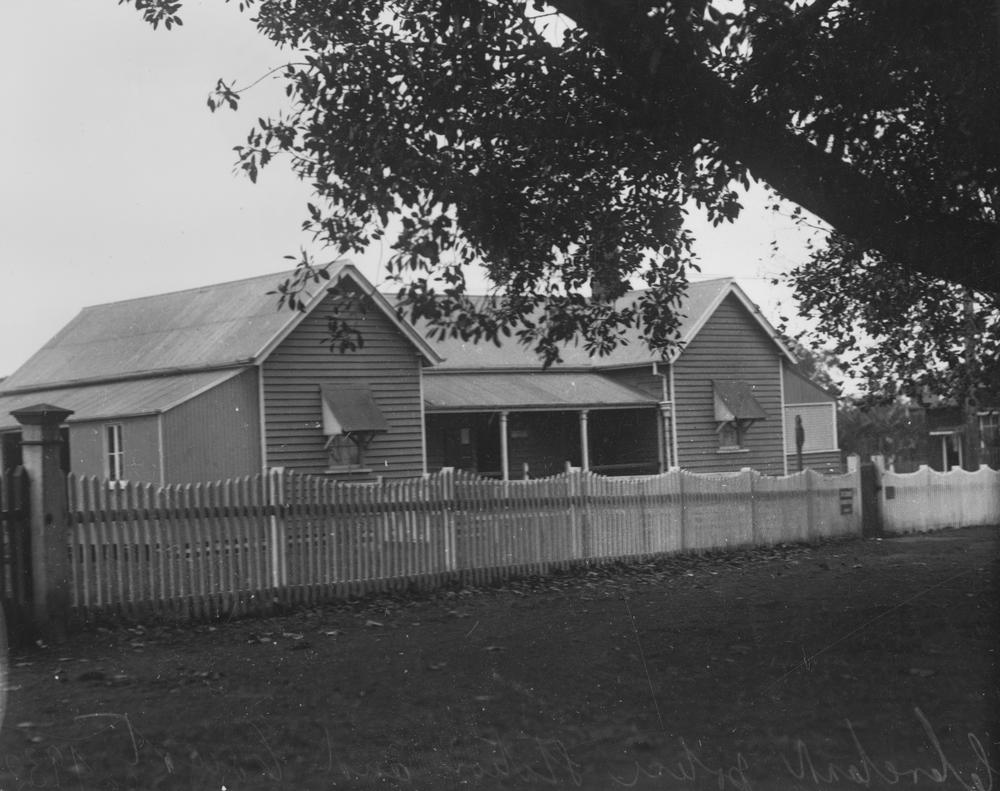
Old Cleveland Police Station and Court House, as seen from North Street, 1932

The Old Cleveland Police Station and Courthouse, constructed 1934–35, is located at the corner of Passage and North Streets. The building is the second purpose built police station and courthouse on the site. It replaced an earlier building constructed in 1879 that also performed both functions.

The Governor of New South Wales (Charles Augustus FitzRoy) authorised a town survey of the area in 1850, and soon after proclamation, the first land sale took place in 1851. At the time of the sale, Ipswich was still a strong contender for the capital of Queensland and there was strong rivalry between Cleveland (promoted by Ipswich interests, supported in turn by the Darling Downs squatters) and Brisbane, as to which would become the port to serve the north of the (then) Colony of New South Wales.

The first police station and lock-up in Cleveland, following the Separation of Queensland from New South Wales in 1859, was located in a building in Paxton Street rented from Francis Edward Bigge. This building survives as the Old Courthouse Restaurant. By the mid-1860s over 100 people were living in the town and government services began to be required. The Cleveland Police District was formed by 1865 and maintained a sergeant and a constable. By the mid-1870s this building was still used for police purposes, although it was becoming evident that a new building was required.

Following the announcement of a reserve in 1874 plans were drawn up by the Office of the Queensland Colonial Architect in 1875. Design approval was given to the drawings on 30 August 1875, however, the building was not constructed. In July 1879 the Police Commissioner wrote to the Colonial Secretary commenting on the unsatisfactory condition of the police station. By the end of the year work had begun on the building and was completed in 1880 at a cost of £436. Besides the delay in construction, the courthouse was also built on a different site to the one reserved in 1874. The area of land on the corner of Shore and Passage Streets was proclaimed on 23 January 1884, by which time the police station and courthouse had been built. This area was "in lieu of that reserved on the 25th September 1874". The original reserve, known as the "Paddock" was subdivided and auctioned as allotments on 26 October 1889.

A defined government precinct had been established including the police station and courthouse. When the Cleveland railway line was constructed from Brisbane to Cleveland in the late 1880s, the survey of the line followed the alignment of Shore Street for some distance, before terminating diagonally opposite the police station where the Cleveland Central railway station was constructed (not the present Cleveland railway station). The line was later extended to Cleveland Point, and this early station was renamed Cleveland West (and was closed in 1960). By the turn of the century the population of Cleveland had grown to over 500.

The first purpose-built police station and courthouse served the local community for over 50 years, however, by the early 1930s there were calls to replace the building as it was showing its age. Plans were prepared for a new police station and courthouse by William James Ewart in November 1934. The new police station and courthouse cost almost £1500 and was described in an Annual Report for 1934–35: "This...new building is of timber construction and has a corrugated fibrolite roof. In addition to the courtroom and office with veranda to same, the accommodation consists of three bedrooms, hall, living room, kitchen, pantry, bathroom and sleepout veranda, together with a veranda on front and back, the back verandah being enclosed to provide dining accommodation. A detached washhouse has also been provided, but the existing cell building, stables, earth closets, etc., from the old building have been reused."

The original floor plan dated 30 November 1934 prepared by the Queensland Government Architect's Office shows a single story timber building comprising public waiting area, court room, and an office to the rear, open verandahs on the northern, western and eastern elevations and an enclosed verandah on the southern elevation. The former Cleveland Police Station and Courthouse is an example of one of a number of courthouse types developed by the Government Architect for use throughout country Queensland and in suburban areas.

The Cleveland Courthouse was a purpose-designed building, reflecting the estimated level of use, accommodating the particular needs of the local community, sited to constitute a strong civic presence to that part of the town. A motel now occupies the post and telegraph office site to the south-east; however, there is clear evidence in the park reserve, in the mature tree planting and the war memorial, of the early role of this area as an important civic precinct.

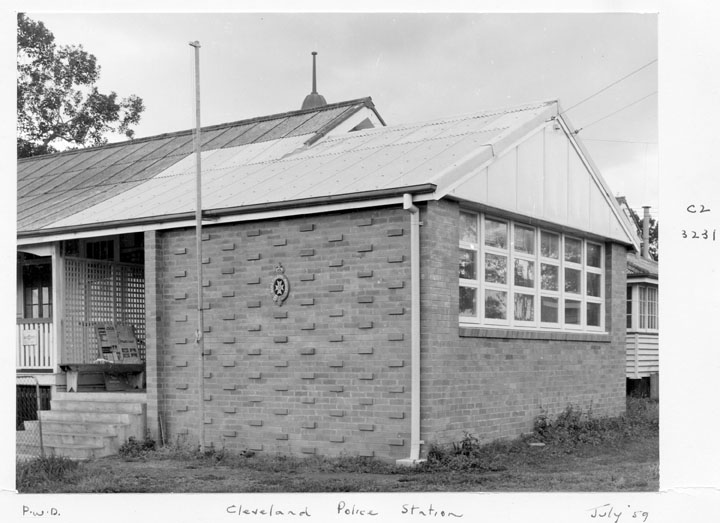
Brick extension on the Passage Street side

The building has strongly defined "private" and "public" sections. The original floor plan states "plan to be reversed". The reversal of the plan resulted in the public side of the building prominently facing the corner of Passage and North Streets, lending more privacy to the domestic side of the building. Originally the verandah on the eastern side was open with a lattice screen, the verandah opened to the public space within the court room. This verandah was enclosed as early as 1939 due to the entry of the weather from that direction and alterations and extensions have continued since that time. The fleche has also been removed.

In 1963, there were plans to extend the original building as well as a proposed new cell block. Early outbuildings were altered and later demolished to provide space for additional accommodation. By 1968, the construction of a new courthouse toward Middle Street was proposed. An existing car port was demolished to provide space for the building. During these renovations, the timber steps along the eastern elevation were also removed and replaced with concrete.

Further work was undertaken in early 1973. Toilets were installed in the residence and the brick cell block was constructed, replacing the earlier wooden cells. Earth closets were also removed at this time. Single men's quarters were still extant at the southern end of the site. In the 1970s demountable buildings were added to the police reserve which was originally designed to accommodate five police. By 1982, the early building was further adapted to accommodate the CIB.

By 1998 the building accommodated almost 50 staff at various times. New premises were constructed and staff moved out of the building in December 1998.

In 2000, the Redland Shire Council and the Returned Services League of Australia announced plans to turn the building into a war memorial museum precinct and museum. The library and museum complex was opened on 28 July 2007 by Phil Weightman, the Member for Cleveland.

== Description ==
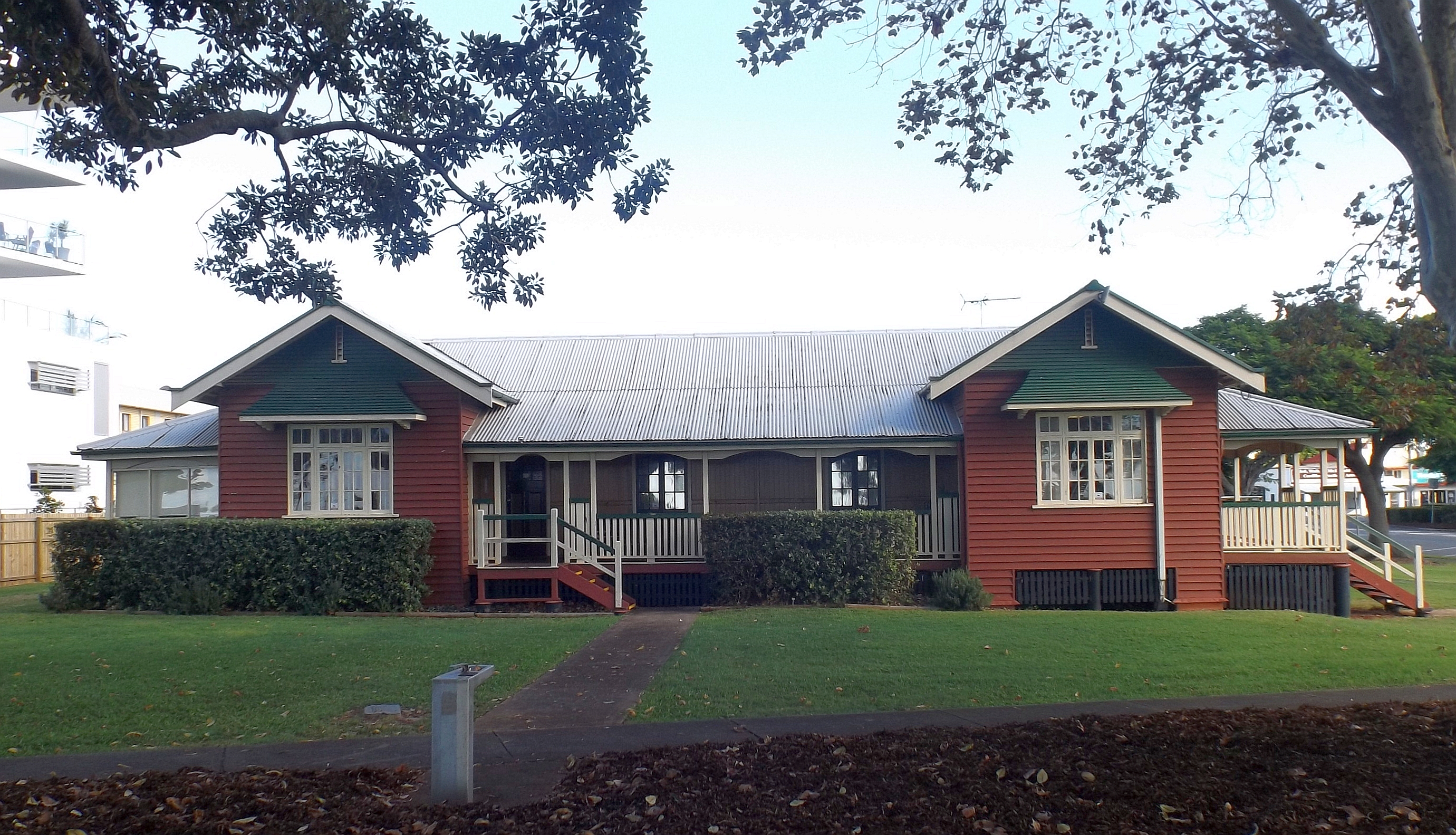
View from north, 2015

The former Cleveland Police Station and Courthouse is a low-set, single-storey, timber building overlooking the memorial reserve on the corner of North and Passage Streets, Cleveland. Two projecting gabled wings are linked by a single-room-width verandahed wing to form a H-shaped plan. The east and middle wings are the former station residence and the west wing accommodates the former courthouse and office. Clad with weatherboards, the building has tongue and groove boarding to the interior and verandahs and a skirt of vertical battens around the base. The front and side verandahs have solid, curved timber valances and battened balustrades. Bellcast hoods sit over the casement windows to the gabled fronts of the flanking wings. Small timber louvred rectangular vents sit above the hoods. The fleche rising from the middle wing roof ridge has been removed. The roofs are sheeted with corrugated fibrolite.

Surrounded by verandahs, the station residence is entered from the verandah to North Street. The front door opens into a hall extending to the rear dining verandah. The east wing has two bedrooms and a kitchen, all opening onto a sleepout verandah. The kitchen also opens to the enclosed rear dining verandah of the middle wing which contains the living room and a bedroom, both flanked by the front and rear verandahs. French doors open from the bedrooms and living room to the verandahs. There are discreet battened fan lights with a small, S-shaped decorative mid-panel to the living room and bedrooms off the hall. An eight-pane sash window opens from the kitchen to the dining verandah. The bathroom is off the rear dining verandah behind the kitchen, and a toilet has been added adjacent to the bathroom in the corner of the rear verandah.

The west wing has undergone a number of alterations. The former entrances to the courthouse and office were off the west verandah to Passage Street. The verandah is now enclosed and partitioned into an office and storage area and is no longer accessed from Passage Street. Concrete paths from 1935 indicate the location of the two sets of timber stairs that arrived at the west verandah and concrete stairs to the verandah remain from later alterations. The courtroom is partitioned into two offices, and a corridor runs between the former verandah and courtroom to the brick extension built to the south. The sheeted and battened ceiling of the courtroom is intact, and part of the glass partition between the courtroom and the office is visible above the doorway in the corridor.

A small, detached, timber washhouse with a corrugated iron clad skillion roof lies immediately south of the east wing. Set on a concrete floor and clad with weatherboards the washhouse has exposed timber framing to the interior, some timber shelving and a copper in the south-east corner.

There are two later extensions to the police station built to the south of the west wing. A brick and timber extension connects directly to the former office, and a steel-framed demountable extends further south from the earlier extension. There are a number of outbuildings on the site, including a brick lock-up and garages. (These structures are not considered to be of cultural heritage significance.)

== Heritage listing ==
The Old Cleveland Police Station with its Court House was listed on the Queensland Heritage Register on 26 March 1999 having satisfied the following criteria.

The place is important in demonstrating the evolution or pattern of Queensland's history.

Constructed in 1934–35, the former Cleveland Police Station and Courthouse is significant for its association with the development of Cleveland, reflecting the importance of Cleveland as a major centre and port, rivalling Brisbane in its early years as the possible port to serve the north. The first purpose-built police station and courthouse was constructed in 1879, demonstrating the continued judicial use of the site for nearly 120 years.

The place demonstrates rare, uncommon or endangered aspects of Queensland's cultural heritage.

The former Cleveland Police Station and Courthouse is significant as a rare example of a combined courthouse, police station and residential building. Most suburban police stations were not constructed with a courthouse, further demonstrating Cleveland's importance as a major centre outside of Brisbane.

The place is important in demonstrating the principal characteristics of a particular class of cultural places.

The former Cleveland Police Station and Courthouse is a fine and intact example of a timber suburban courthouse. It has a special association with the work of the Government Architect's Office which developed a number of courthouse types which sought to respond to matters both economic and climatic, as well as providing a high quality of public building even on this modest scale.

The place is important because of its aesthetic significance.

The siting of the former Cleveland Police Station and Courthouse at the corner of Passage and North Streets provides evidence of the early role of the area as an important and strongly defined civic precinct, an area which includes the park reserve, mature tree planting and the war memorial. It is significant as an unpretentious building contributing a confident civic presence to the street. Thoughtful planning has produced a commodious building suited to its function.

The place has a strong or special association with a particular community or cultural group for social, cultural or spiritual reasons.

The site of the former Cleveland police station and courthouse is significant for a long association with law and order and the dispensing of justice in Cleveland since 1879. The building was a focus for a wide range of community services and this, together with the tradition of constables-in-charge, ensured that the former Cleveland police station and courthouse provided an important community focus in the town.

The place has a special association with the life or work of a particular person, group or organisation of importance in Queensland's history.

The former Cleveland Police Station and Courthouse is significant for its association with Brisbane architect, William James Ewart, who designed the building. Ewart was chief architect with the Department of Public Works from 1923 to 1927 and senior architect from 1927 to 1934.
