= Cleveland, Queensland =

Cleveland
- Suburb
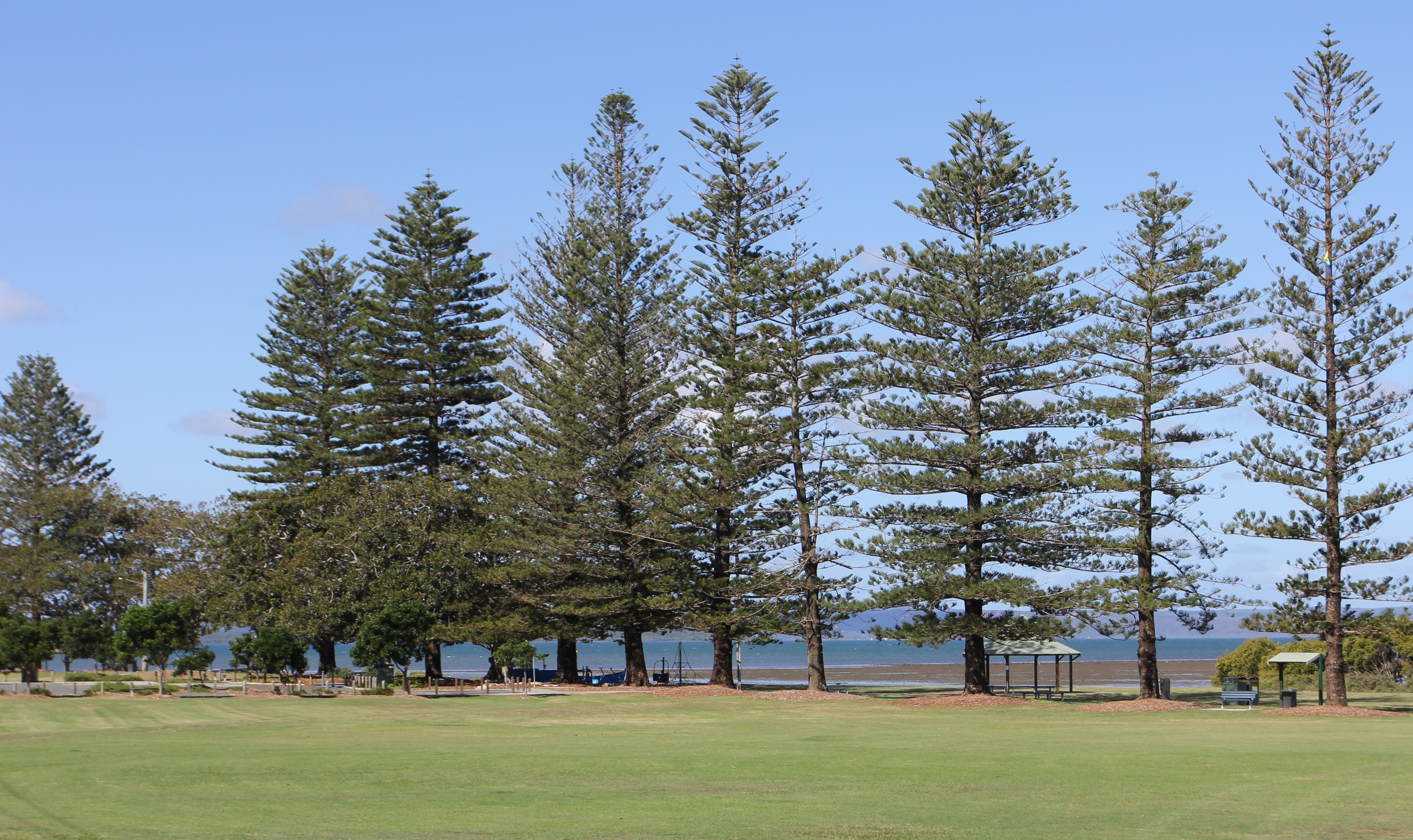
- Norfolk Pines in G.J. Walter Park, Cleveland

- Interactive map of Cleveland
- Coordinates: 27.5336°S 153.2644°E
- Country: Australia
- State: Queensland
- City: Redland City
- LGA: Redland City
- Location: 9.5 km (5.9 mi) E of Capalaba; 29.4 km (18.3 mi) ESE of Brisbane CBD
- Established: 1850

Government
  - State electorate: Oodgeroo
  - Federal division: Bowman

Area
  - Total: 15.8 km^{2} (6.1 sq mi)

Population
  - Total: 15,850 (2021 census)
  - Density: 1,003/km^{2} (2,598/sq mi)
- Time zone: UTC+10:00 (AEST)
- Postcode: 4163
Suburbs around Cleveland
Ormiston	Moreton Bay	Moreton Bay
Alexandra Hills	Cleveland	Moreton Bay
Alexandra Hills	Thornlands	Thornlands

Cleveland is a coastal and central locality in the City of Redland, Queensland, Australia. In the 2021 census, Cleveland had a population of 15,850 people. Cleveland is part of the Brisbane metropolitan area.

Its location makes it a transport hub for islands in Moreton Bay.

== Geography ==
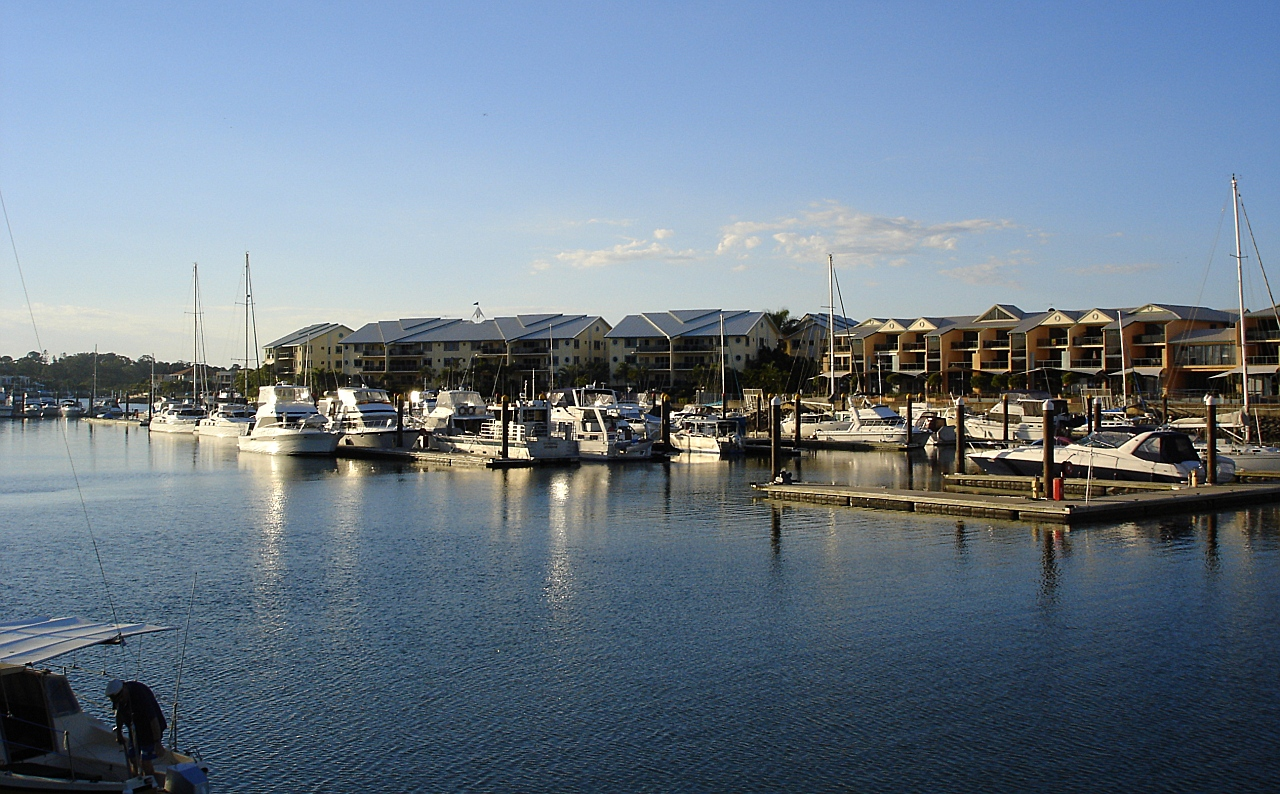
Raby Bay Marina

Cleveland is located on the western shores of Moreton Bay approximately 25 kilometres (16 mi) east-south-east of Brisbane, the capital of the Australian state of Queensland. It comprises commercial, residential and industrial areas and is the location of Redland City's Council Chambers, offices and various cultural facilities.

Raby Bay was an area of mangroves and mudflats which has been developed as canal estates and a marina development.

Toondah Harbour is the location of the Stradbroke Island Ferry Terminal used by water taxis and vehicular ferries to provide access to North Stradbroke Island. This area of Moreton Bay is naturally shallow but the Fison Channel has been dredged to provide access for vehicular ferries which connect Cleveland to Dunwich. Toondah Harbour is situated in an area of coastal wetlands featuring sandbanks, mudflats and mangroves which provide important habitats for dugongs, turtles and many shorebird species including migratory birds such as the critically endangered eastern curlew. Most of the wetlands in this area, except for Toondah Harbour and its primary channel, are within the boundaries of the Moreton Bay Ramsar site.

Cassim Island, an area of sandbanks and mangroves located to the north of Toondah Harbour, provides the Harbour with shelter from northerly winds. The island is named after William Cassim, an early Cleveland hotel keeper. Cassim Island provides a high value habitat for wading birds and other mangrove fauna.

The Cleveland–Redland Bay Road exits to the south.

== History ==
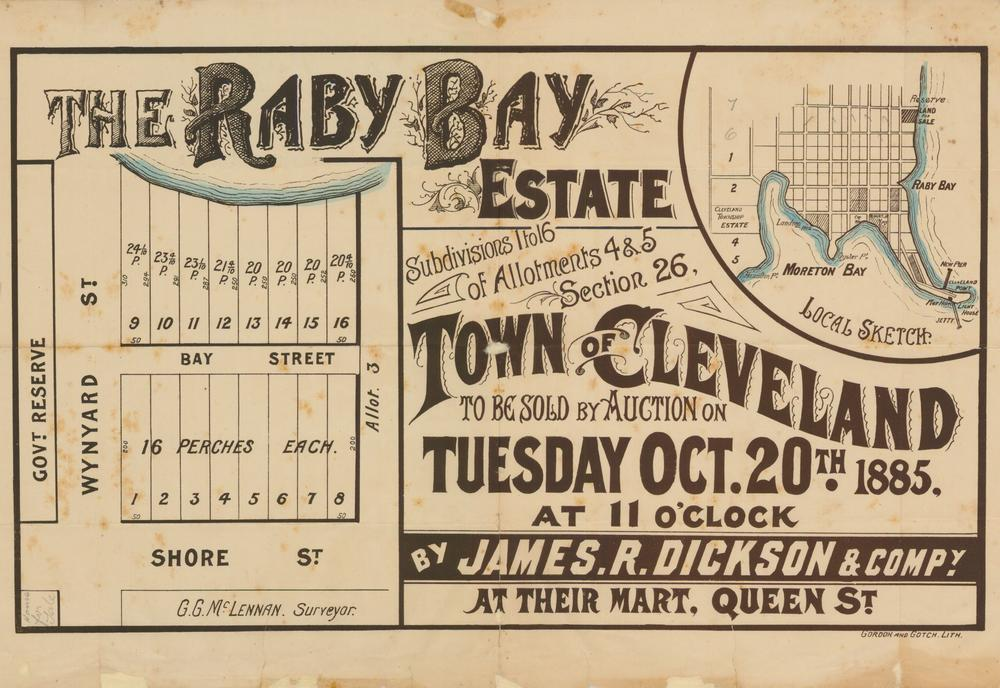
Raby Bay Estate Map, 1885

Cleveland is the traditional territory of the Koobenpul clan of the Quandamooka. There are conflicting reports as to the naming of Cleveland; it was either named in 1770 by Captain James Cook in honour of John Clevland, the Secretary of the Admiralty around the time, or by surveyors in the 1840s, in honour of William Vane, 1st Duke of Cleveland. The latter is more likely as Cook did not enter Moreton Bay when he passed by on 17 May 1770 and it is not mentioned in his journal.

European settlement of Brisbane and surrounding areas was banned from 1824 until 1842, due to the Moreton Bay Penal Settlement, but the area to become Cleveland was first surveyed in 1840, and in 1841, was recommended for a maritime or seaport township. In 1847 a navigation beacon was established at Cleveland Point.

In 1847, the Government planned for the new town, and on 13 December 1850, Cleveland was proclaimed a township. The first land sales of the new township took place a year later, with early purchases primarily around Cleveland Point, at the time an early candidate for a major port to replace Brisbane. Brisbane was troubled by sand bars across the mouth of the Brisbane River, and Cleveland Point was closer to the southern passage (the entrance to Moreton Bay between North Stradbroke Island and Moreton Island).

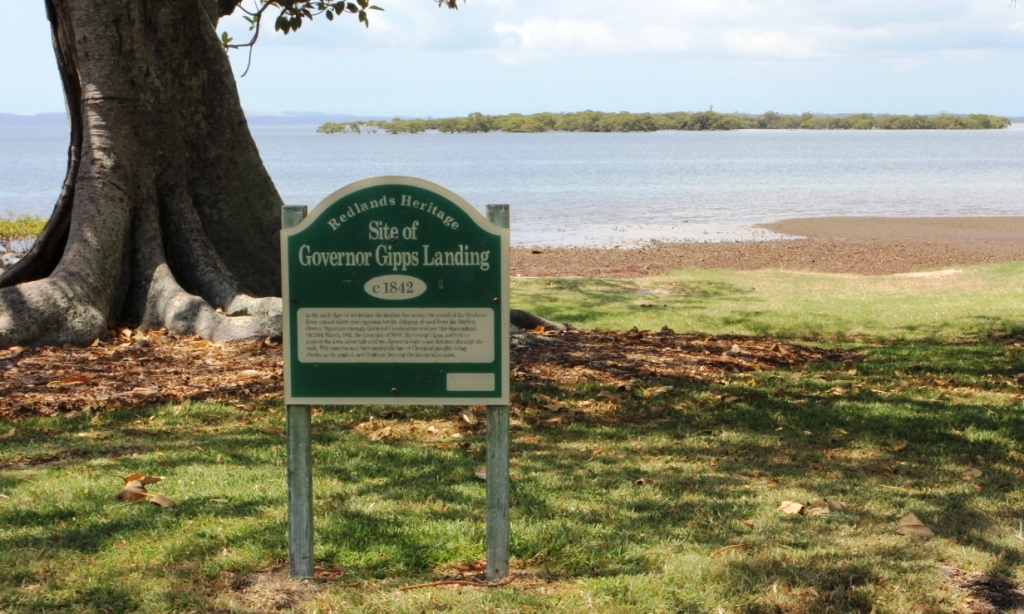
Sign in G.J. Walter Park marking where Governor Sir George Gipps landed, 1842

However, when Governor Sir George Gipps visited Cleveland in 1842, it is reported that upon disembarking his boat, he immediately sank into the mudflats up to his waist. He was so annoyed by this that he changed his mind and suggested Ipswich. A series of wreckings in the southern passage led to ships using the longer but safer northern entrance between Bribie and Moreton islands. This, and an unfortunate fire at the Cleveland jetty, removed any hopes for Cleveland. In 1852, the first large buildings were built in Cleveland; what is now the Grand View Hotel, and the Old Courthouse, at the time a workers cottage. Farms sprang up; a brickworks was built at the point, and a wool store to handle shipping. The first mail service to Cleveland began in 1861, with the first school established at the same time. The wool store, unused because of Cleveland's failure as a port, was converted into a sawmill, which supplied timber to a shipyard built at the Point. The population at this time was only 270. Tourism blossomed with the arrival of the first regular steamer service to Cleveland in 1864.

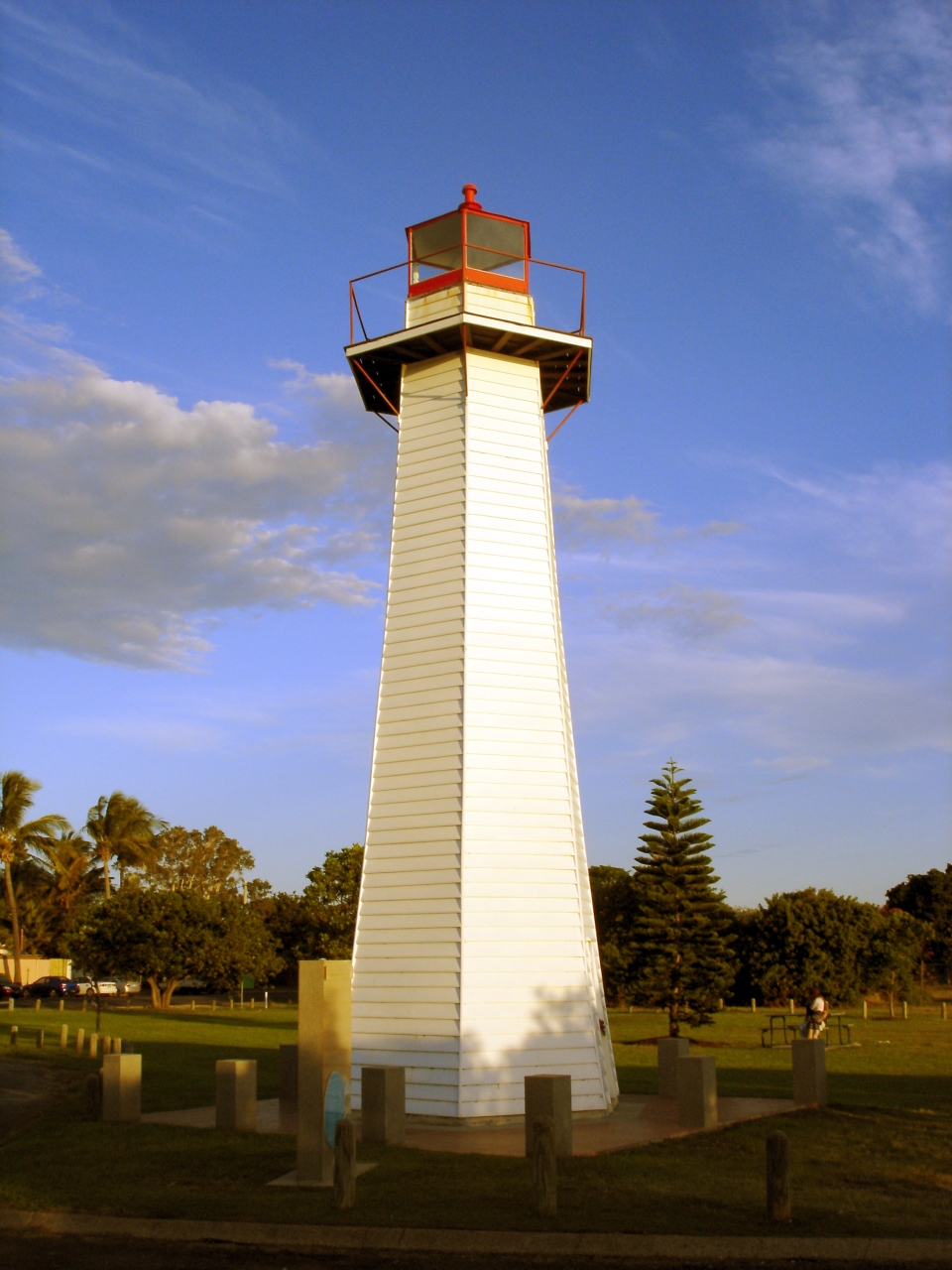
The Cleveland Point Light

The Cleveland Point Light was also constructed in 1864, and was only replaced in 1969. From this time, the most popular crop was sugar cane, until it was replaced by the popularity of fruits such as passion fruit and strawberries.

A rail line connecting Brisbane to Cleveland was completed in 1889, and with it tourism, residential subdivisions and farming further grew in the area.

The area now known as G.J. Walter Park was originally proclaimed a reserve by the Government on 13 March 1889. This area was used mainly by residents and day trippers for swimming, picnicking and general park use. This area is included on the Redland City Council's Register of Heritage Places classified as being of local significance.

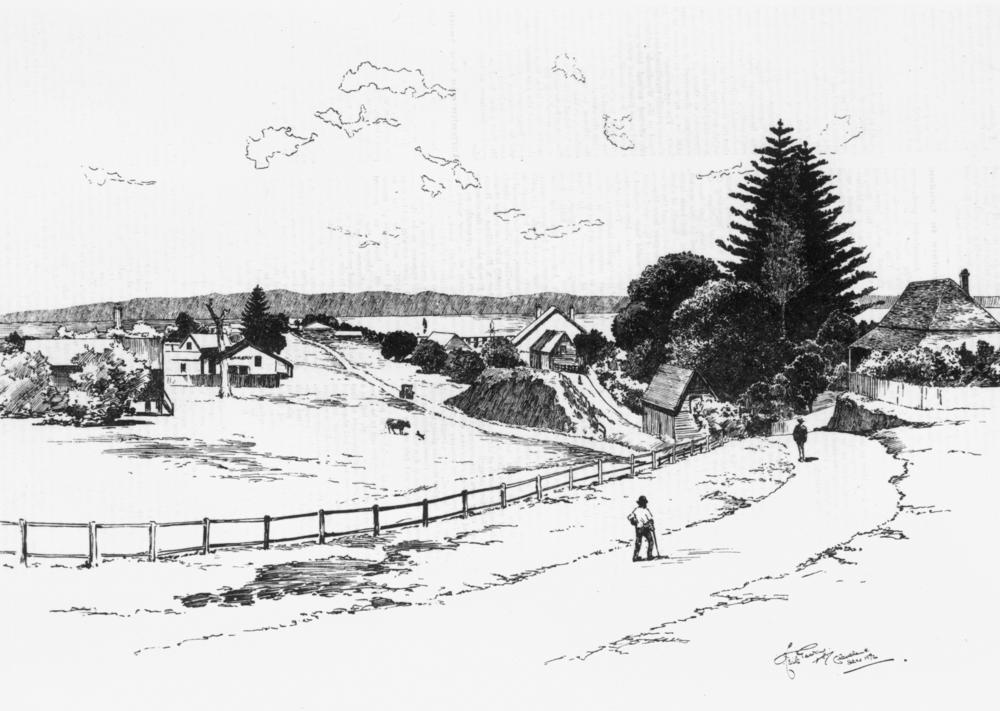
Sketch of Cleveland as viewed from the Brighton (Grand View) Hotel, 1892

The rail line continued further than it does today, terminating at Cleveland Point - the existing Cleveland station was constructed later, for passenger use.

The Redlands attracted farming families and became a district known for producing fruits and vegetables with crops of strawberries, tomatoes, pineapples, custard apples, citrus fruits, bananas, herbs and vegetables grown.

The first Methodist services were held in Cleveland in 1908. Cleveland Methodist Church was opened in November 1909 on the corner of Passage and Queen Streets. On 13 May 1961 the foundation stone was laid for a new church by Reverend Joseph Tainton, President of the Queensland Methodist Conference. With the amalgamation of the Methodist Church into the Uniting Church in Australia in 1977, the church became the Cleveland Uniting Church. On 30 March 1980 the foundation stone for the third and current church building was laid by Reverend Douglas Fredrick Kirkup, Secretary of the Queensland Synod of the Uniting Church in Australia, and was opened on 22 June 1980 by Reverend Ronald Wilfred Elvery, the Moderator of the Queensland Synod of the Uniting Church in Australia. The two former church buildings remain on the site and are used as halls.

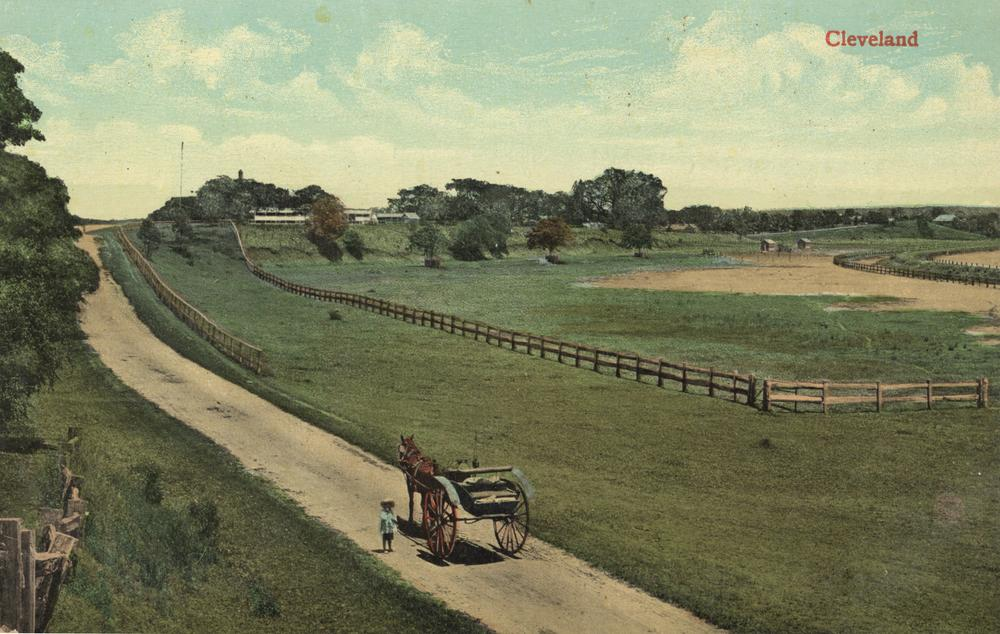
Shore Street, Cleveland looking south. View of Brighton (Grand View) Hotel, 1907

By the outbreak of World War I, the population in Cleveland had hit 540.

In 1960, lack of demand ended the rail service to Cleveland, and it was only restored twenty years later, by which time the population of Cleveland was over 5000.

The completion of the Leslie Harrison Dam allowed town water to be connected to the shire, with the majority of the town being serviced by 1970.

Construction of the Raby Bay canal estate broke ground in 1983.

By 1992, the population of Cleveland was nearing 10,000.

The current Cleveland Library opened in 1997.

== Demographics ==
In the 2016 census, Cleveland recorded a population of 14,801 people, 52.6% female and 47.4% male. The median age of the Cleveland population was 49 years, 11 years above the national median of 38. 64.8% of people living in Cleveland were born in Australia. The other top responses for country of birth were England 9.3%, New Zealand 5.8%, South Africa 2.0%, Scotland 1.3%, Germany 0.7%. 86.3% of people spoke only English at home; the next most common languages were, 1.1% Mandarin, 0.4% Cantonese, 0.4% German, 0.3% Afrikaans, 0.3% Spanish.In the 2016 census, Cleveland had a population of 14,801 people.

In the 2021 census, Cleveland had a population of 15,850 people.

== Heritage listings ==
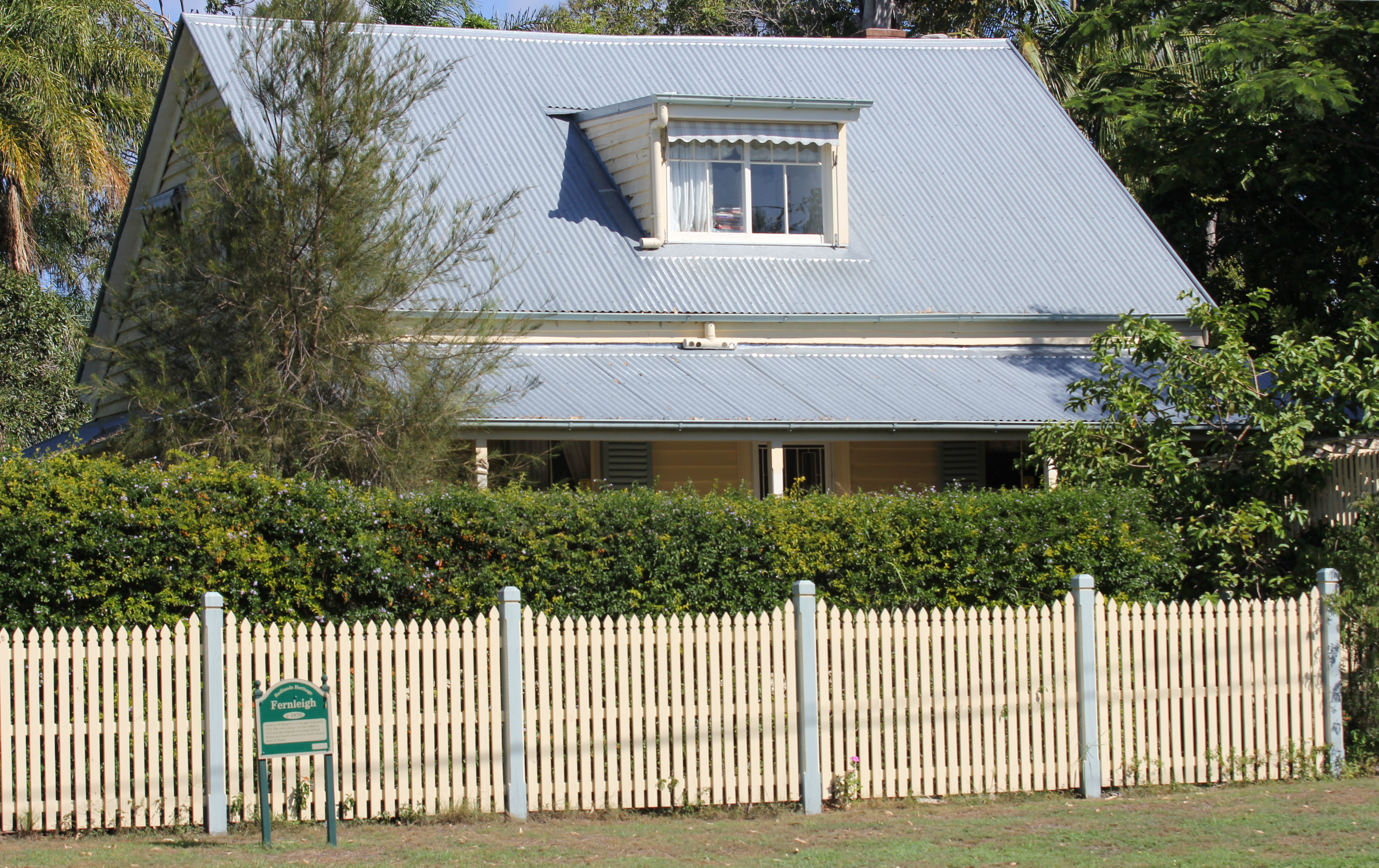
Fernleigh, Cleveland, Queensland house built c. 1870 by William Taylor

Cleveland has a number of heritage-listed sites, including:

- Cross Street: St Pauls Anglican Church
- 11 Lisa Street: Cleveland Pioneer Cemetery
- Outside 204 Middle Street: Moreton Bay Fig tree
- 240 Middle Street East: GJ Walter Park
- 47–49 North Street: Massive mature banyan tree
- 49 North Street: Grand View Hotel
- 1–11 Passage Street: Old Cleveland Police Station
- 1 Paxton Street: Old Cleveland Court House (Courthouse Restaurant)
- Shore Street: Cleveland War Memorial
- 73 Shore Street East: Fernleigh, early Cleveland building
- Shore Street North: Cleveland Point Light
- 109 Shore Street North: Cleveland Hotel (Cassim's Hotel)
- 127 Shore Street North: Norfolk Island Pine Trees
- 44–76 Smith Street: RSL Hall

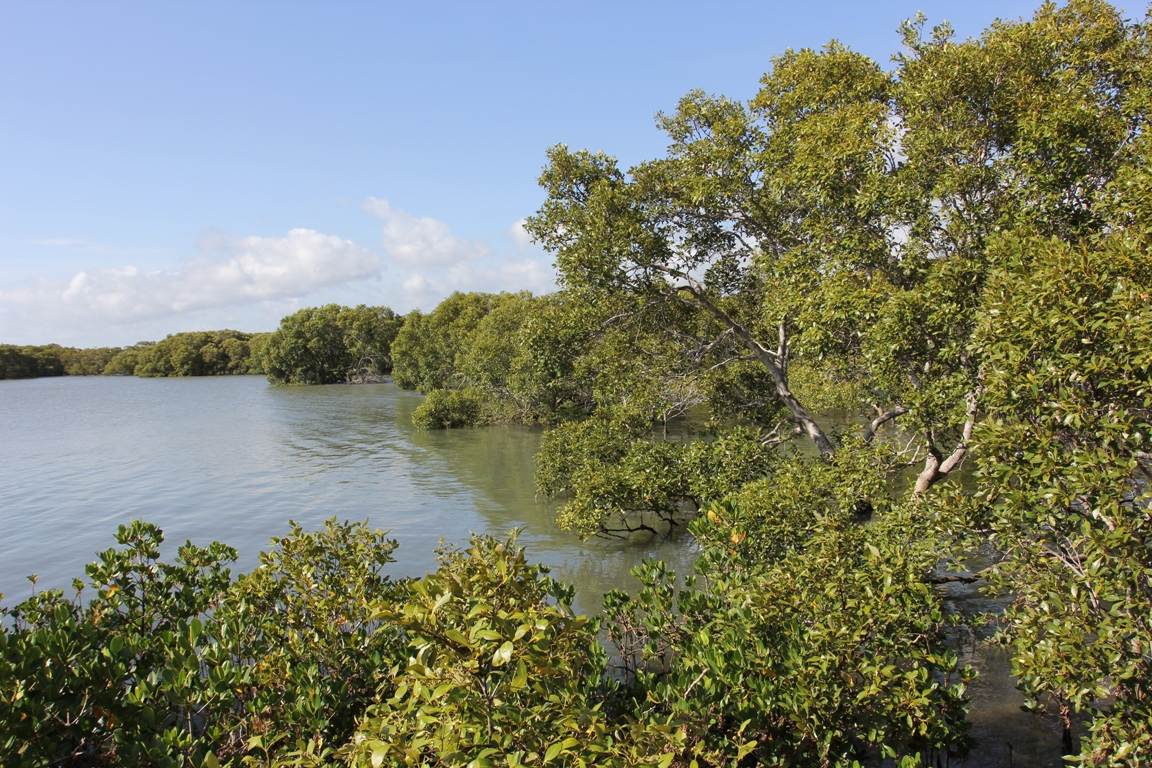
Mangroves immediately south of Toondah Harbour

== Education ==
Cleveland State School is a government primary (Prep–6) school for boys and girls at Queen Street (27.5283°S 153.2702°E). In 2018, the school had an enrolment of 706 students with 49 teachers (44 full-time equivalent) and 24 non-teaching staff (17 full-time equivalent). It includes a special education program.

Star of the Sea Primary School is a Catholic primary (Prep–6) school for boys and girls at 53 Passage Street (27.5289°S 153.2791°E). In 2018, the school had an enrolment of 220 students with 18 teachers (16 full-time equivalent) and 12 non-teaching staff (6 full-time equivalent).

Cleveland District State High School is a government secondary (7–12) school for boys and girls at Russell Street (27.5298°S 153.2602°E). In 2018, the school had an enrolment of 2,028 students with 150 teachers (144 full-time equivalent) and 55 non-teaching staff (40 full-time equivalent). It includes a special education program.

Australian Industry Trade College – Redlands is a private secondary (11–12) school for boys and girls at 233 Middle Street (27.5266°S 153.2819°E). In 2018, the school had an enrolment of 250 students with 14 teachers and 23 non-teaching staff (18 full-time equivalent).

== Facilities ==
Facilities at Cleveland include:

- The Redland Hospital, including the Mater private hospital wing
- Cleveland Industrial Estate

== Amenities ==
The Redland Museum, viewed from the Cleveland Showgrounds

A number of regionally important cultural facilities are located in Cleveland including:

- Redland Art Gallery
- Redland Museum
- Redland Performing Arts Centre
- Cleveland Library at Corner Bloomfield and Middle Streets, operated by the Redland City Council

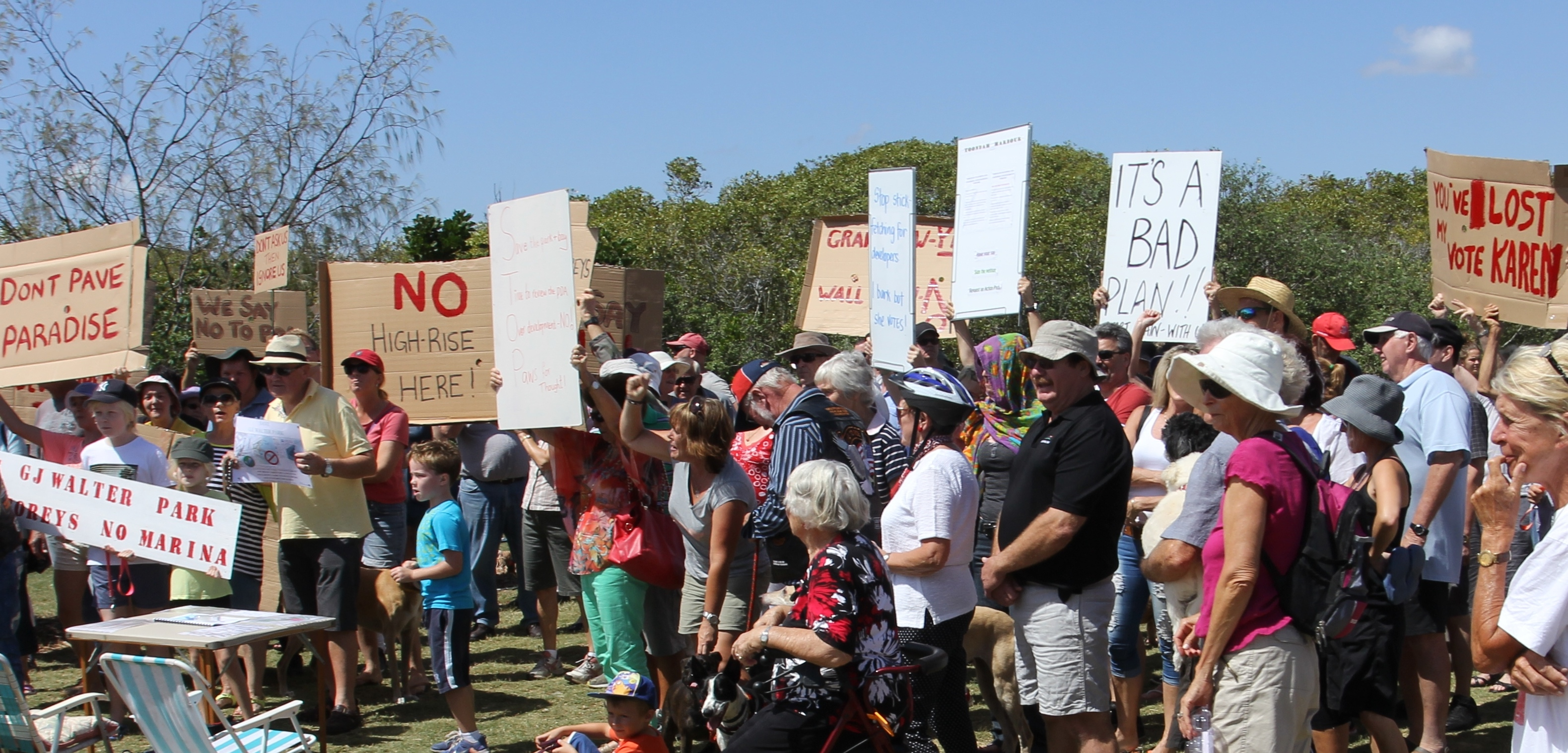
Protest against plans to develop marina and high rise buildings in area around G.J. Walter Park, Cleveland, Queensland

The Redlands branch of the Queensland Country Women's Association meets at 3 Waterloo Street.

G.J. Walter Park is a large public recreation facility located on coastal foreshores north of Toondah Harbour, overlooking Cassim Island.

Cleveland Showgrounds is home to the Redlands United FC and a venue for many events.

Cleveland Uniting Church is at 36 Passage Street (corner of Queen Street, 27.5283°S 153.2787°E).

== Attractions ==
Attractions in Cleveland include:

- Cleveland Point and the Cleveland Point Light

== Events ==
Major events at Cleveland include:

- The Cleveland Markets, held in Bloomfield Street every Sunday morning
- RedFest (formerly known as the Strawberry Festival from 1965–2001), held at the Cleveland Showgrounds

== Transport ==
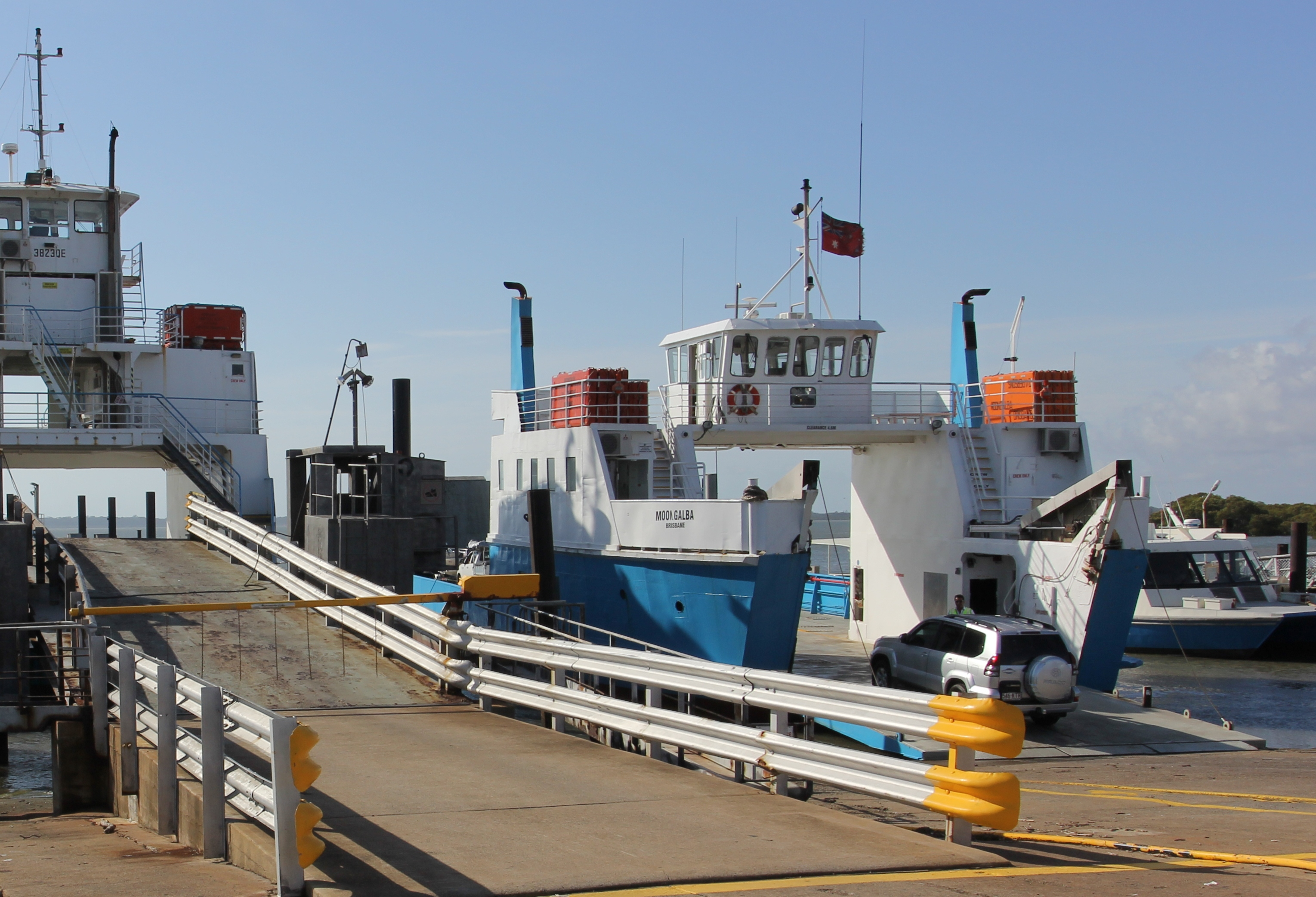
Vehicular ferry at Toondah Harbour

Major road access to Cleveland is provided by Finucane Road and Bloomfield Street. Cleveland railway station provides access to regular Queensland Rail City network services to Brisbane via the Cleveland Railway Line. In January 2013, a Queensland Rail suburban train overran the bumper at the end of the line and crashed into the toilet block of the train station. Although initial impression were that the train's brakes had failed, the subsequent inquiry put the blame on the rails being made slippery by a combination of leaves, oil, and rain, possibly caused by a storm a few days earlier.

== Controversies ==
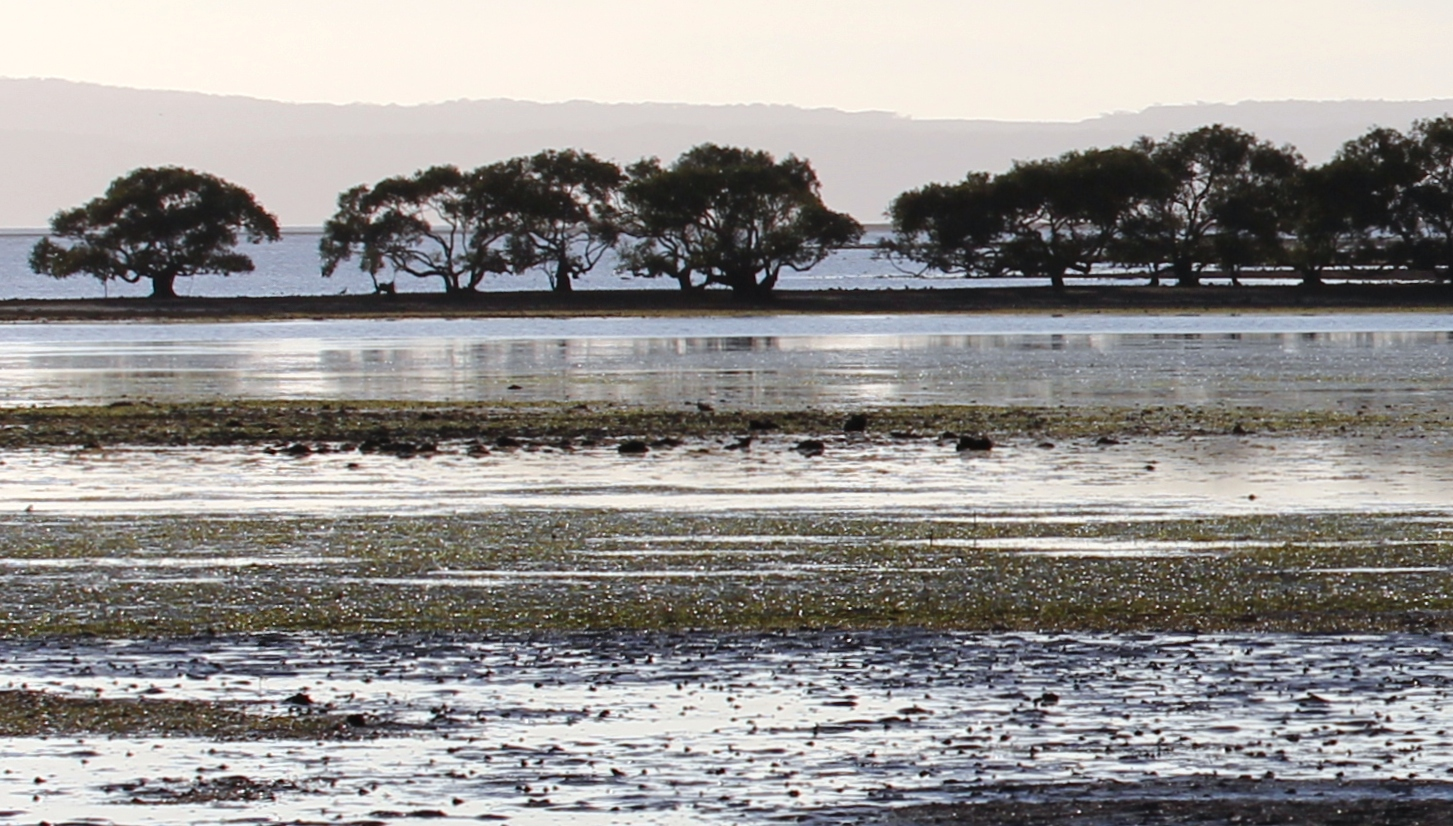
Cassim Island viewed from G.J. Walter Park, Cleveland

In 2014 the Queensland Government proposed an extensive development between Toondah Harbour and Cassim Island including an 800 berth marina. On 23 February 2014 approximately 300 people attended a rally to protest against the Government's plans to "carve up" the G.J. Walter Park as part of its Toondah Harbour redevelopment proposal.

A number of Queensland architects and planners reviewed the scheme at an Urban Design Workshop. The workshop Convenor said the group found the current Toondah scheme "too large, unfeasible and risky". He said the workshop recommended smaller developments across the city linking Raby Bay with Cleveland's CBD and the ferry terminal.

On 4 March 2014 a petition with 1,211 signatures calling for the Government's plans to be withdrawn was tabled in the Queensland Parliament.

On 19 March the Council decided to ask the Queensland Government to make some changes to the plan which include reducing building heights from 15 storeys to 10 and a 400-berth marina at Toondah Harbour instead of 800 berths.

In April 2014, after the consultation period had ended, the Redland City Council released copies of expert reports used to prepare the proposed development scheme.

On 31 May 2014 an approved development scheme was released together with a lengthy report on the 583 submissions received during the consultation period.

== Bibliography ==
- Steele, John Gladstone (2015). Aboriginal Pathways: in Southeast Queensland and the Richmond River. University of Queensland Press. ISBN 978-0-702-25742-1.
