= Cleveland Hotel =

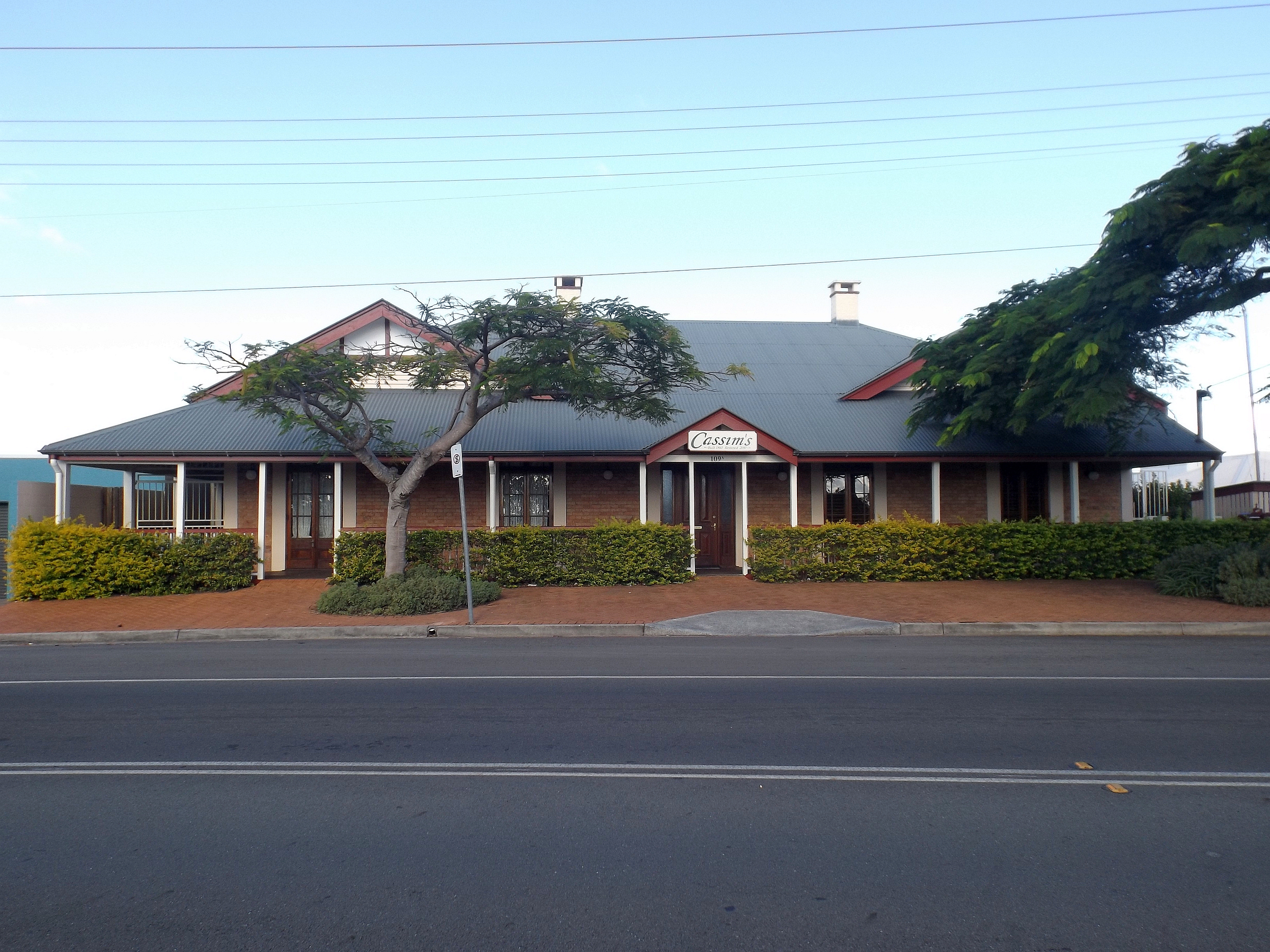
- Building in 2015

- Location within Queensland Location within Australia
- 27.5222°S 153.2866°E
- Location: 109 Shore Street North, Cleveland, City of Redland, Queensland, Australia

History
- Design period: 1840s–1860s (mid-19th century)
- Built: c. 1860–1940s

Queensland Heritage Register
- Official name: Cleveland Hotel (former), Cassim's Hotel, Sorrento Flats
- Type: state heritage (built)
- Designated: 30 October 1995
- Reference no.: 601130
- Significant period: 1860s (fabric) c. 1860–1929 (historical use as hotel); 1940s–1960s (use as flats); 1860s–1877 (worship)

Cleveland Hotel is a heritage-listed former hotel at 109 Shore Street North, Cleveland, City of Redland, Queensland, Australia. It was built from c. 1860 to 1940s. It is also known as Cassim's Hotel and Sorrento Flats. It was added to the Queensland Heritage Register on 30 October 1995.

== History ==
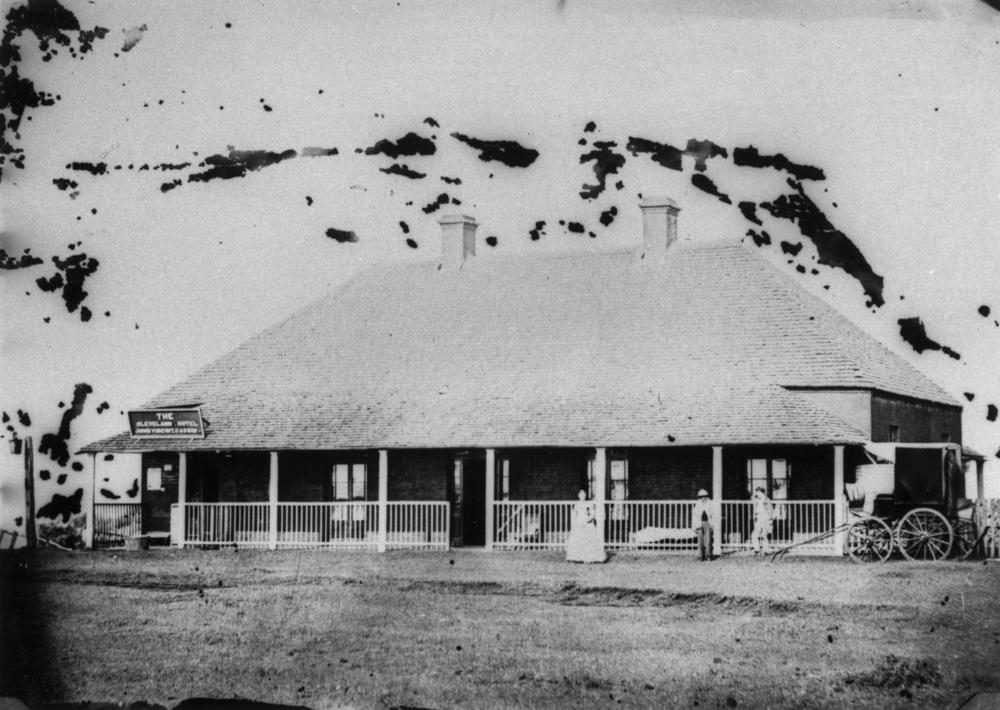
Cleveland Hotel, ca. 1871

This two-storeyed masonry hotel was built c. 1860 for John Vincent Cassim and his wife Mary Teally, Cleveland boarding house/hotel keepers since 1855.

Cassim was a Mauritian Indian, whom it appears was transported to Moreton Bay in 1840. A person named Cassim, who had been tried at the Port Louis assizes, and had received a seven-year sentence, was amongst a group of Mauritian convicts who were transported to Sydney via the Layton early in 1840 (Mauritius had been occupied by the British since 1810). In April 1840 fifteen of these men, including Cassim, were sent on to Moreton Bay, which was soon to be opened for free settlement, apparently to conduct experiments in sugar growing. Sugar was the principal Mauritian cash crop at this period, and was exported regularly to New South Wales. Presumably, the Mauritian convicts were considered to have had some experience in the sugar industry.

Cassim received a ticket-of-leave at Moreton Bay in February 1844, and in mid-1845 a John Cassim and his wife Mary were resident in Brisbane Town. It is likely that Cassim, John Cassim and John Vincent Cassim, who c. 1845 married at Moreton Bay an Irish girl named Mary Teally, were one and the same person. Little is known about Mary, or how she came to be at Moreton Bay, other than that she had arrived in New South Wales in the early 1840s. By 1851, John and Mary Cassim were operating a boarding house at Kangaroo Point, which they maintained until late 1855.

From late 1855 to mid-1860 the Cassims leased Cleveland House (now the Grandview Hotel), and an adjacent dwelling, from pastoralist Francis Edward Bigge. These buildings had been erected at Cleveland in the early 1850s as part of Bigge's unsuccessful push to establish Cleveland as the principal port of the Moreton Bay region. Amongst the earliest buildings in the township, they appear to have remained unoccupied for several years until taken up as Cassim's Family Hotel and Boarding House.

In the late 1850s, with the separation of Queensland from New South Wales imminent, there was some renewal of interest in Cleveland as the port to service Ipswich, which was still a strong contender for capital of Queensland. Although Brisbane interests prevailed and Cleveland was to remain an isolated seaside resort, by 1860 the township had gained sufficient popularity as a watering place to support two hotels: the Brighton Hotel (formerly Cassim's Family Hotel), and Cassim's new hotel, the Cleveland Hotel.

In 1858 JV Cassim had acquired allotment 1 of section 6, par Cleveland, adjacent to and north of Cleveland House, on the road toward Cleveland Point. On this site, c. 1860, Cassim erected his Cleveland Hotel. The building was extant by September 1860, when he took out a £300 mortgage on the property, and was required to insure the house situated on the land. About this time it was discovered that the hotel had been constructed across the southern boundary of the allotment; subsequently, a small parcel of land was surveyed as allotment 1A and purchased by Cassim in January 1861.

By 1863 the hotel comprised a bar, parlour, sitting-rooms, bedrooms, storeroom, a kitchen with servant's room attached, and verandahs front and back. The grounds included stables, coachhouse, fowlhouse, garden, jetty and bathing house. In 1872/73, Cassim acquired the adjacent allotment to the north (allotment 2 of section 6), and in 1879, two adjoining blocks to the south (allotments 20 & 21 of section 6).

Mary Cassim died in 1861, and was buried at Dunwich Cemetery. In 1868 John married Irish immigrant Anne (or Mary Anne) Rafter, who appears to have arrived at Moreton Bay in the mid-1860s. There were no children from either marriage. JV Cassim died in 1884, and was buried at Dunwich. Anne held the license of the Cleveland Hotel until 1903, and retained the property until 1916. She died at the Dunwich Benevolent Asylum in 1921, and was buried at the Nudgee Catholic Cemetery. The Cassims were well-known and respected Cleveland identities and devout Catholics, whose hotel not only was synonymous with Cleveland as a seaside resort, but also served as a mass centre from the early 1860s until the construction of the first Catholic church at Cleveland in 1877. John was a trustee of the local church in the 1870s and 1880s, and would not accept payment from any priest staying at the hotel. Cassim's Island, in Moreton Bay, is named after him.

By c. 1912 a verandah had been added to the southern side of the hotel, and the shingled roof had been replaced with corrugated iron. About 1919 the southern allotments containing the gardens were resurveyed into eight subdivisions, six of which were sold.

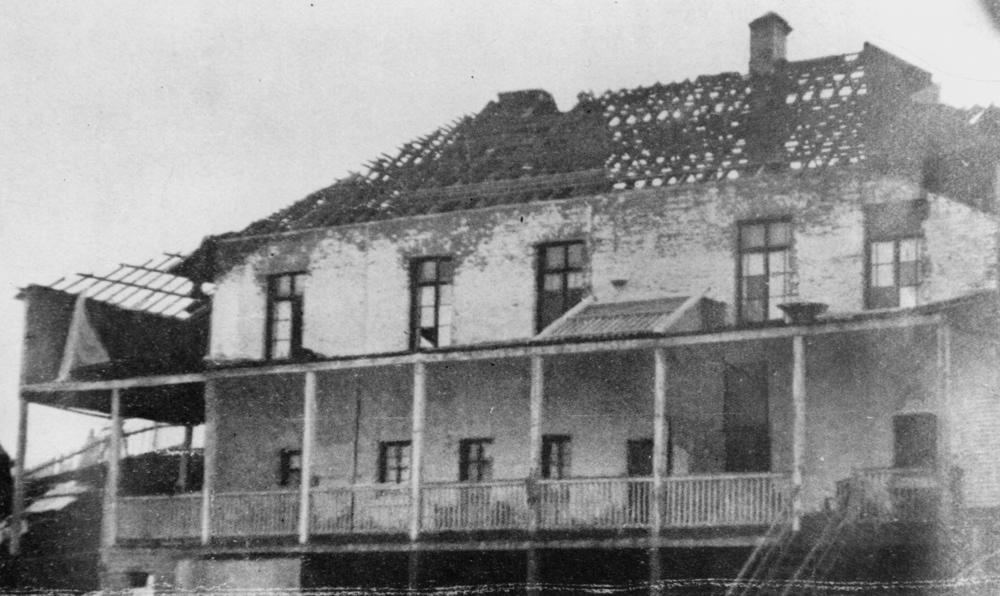
Rear view of the Cleveland Hotel after being damaged by a storm, June 1929

The building was renovated c. 1924, and continued to function as the Cleveland Hotel until severely storm damaged in June 1929. The property changed ownership in July 1929, but whether the building was repaired at this stage is not clear. In July and August 1929, Brisbane architect John Patrick Donoghue called tenders for the rebuilding of the Cleveland Hotel, but in 1930 publican Nicholas John Thurecht, who had acquired the lease of the Cleveland Hotel in 1927, had removed to the new centre of Cleveland township and the new Raby Bay Hotel (now the Cleveland Sands Hotel), for which Donoghue had called tenders in September and October 1929.

Local residents believe the old Cleveland Hotel remained vacant until converted into flats during or just after the Second World War. This may correspond to a change in ownership in 1948. The renovations, still evident, included rebuilding the roof with its present gables and chimney stacks; removal of what was left of the southern and rear verandahs; replacing the front verandah balustrading with weatherboards; cutting additional doors in the north and south walls; and rendering the exterior.

In the 1940s and 1950s, the former Cleveland Hotel appears to have been known as the Sorrento Flats. The building is understood to have remained unoccupied since the 1960s, possibly following another change in ownership in 1965.

In 2000, the building was restored and in 2010 was used as commercial office space.

== Description ==
The former Cleveland Hotel, fronting Moreton Bay and located on the steep east facing slope of the ridge running along Cleveland Point, appears as a single-storeyed rendered masonry building from Shore Street, but has a lower floor facing the water.

The building has a corrugated iron hipped roof with two projecting gables and a skillion roofed verandah with a central gabled entrance porch to the western street side. There are two chimney stacks and the gables have fibrous-cement sheeting with timber cover strips and weatherboards.

The west verandah has a weatherboard balustrade with rectangular open batten panels. There is a skillion roofed east verandah to the lower floor which has had the northern end and the entrance stairs damaged. The base of the building consists of rubble with concrete piers and concrete supports for the east verandah.

Interior walls are of rendered masonry with some fibrous cement partitions and the original arched entrance has been bricked in. A few casement windows survive, but most of the windows, doors and all of the French doors opening onto the front verandah have been removed. The upper floor is of timber. There is no internal access between floors.

A weatherboard double garage with a corrugated iron gable roof is located to the south at street level. This is not considered to be of cultural heritage significance. The steep site levels off to a flat foreshore area with a concrete retaining wall to the water. The hotel has views across water to Stradbroke Island to the east and Raby Bay to the northwest.

== Heritage listing ==
The former Cleveland Hotel was listed on the Queensland Heritage Register on 30 October 1995 having satisfied the following criteria.

The place is important in demonstrating the evolution or pattern of Queensland's history.

The former Cleveland Hotel, erected c. 1860, is important in demonstrating the evolution of Queensland's history, being associated with the establishment of the township of Cleveland in the 1850s and 1860s and with the evolution of Cleveland as a popular seaside resort in the second half of the 19th and early 20th centuries. The place is an integral element in a group of historic buildings along the road leading to Cleveland Point.

The place demonstrates rare, uncommon or endangered aspects of Queensland's cultural heritage.

It demonstrates rare aspects of Queensland's cultural heritage, being one of the earliest surviving buildings in Cleveland and a rare surviving Queensland example of a substantial, c. 1860, two-storeyed masonry hotel, the structure and fabric of which is strongly evident despite the 20th century conversion to flats. It has potential to reveal information about 1850s/60s construction techniques and materials in Queensland.

The place has a special association with the life or work of a particular person, group or organisation of importance in Queensland's history.

The place has a special association with the life and work of John and Anne Cassim and their contribution to the character of Cleveland as a popular seaside resort in the second half of the 19th century, and with the establishment of the Catholic Church in Cleveland.
