= Fernleigh, Cleveland =

Fernleigh
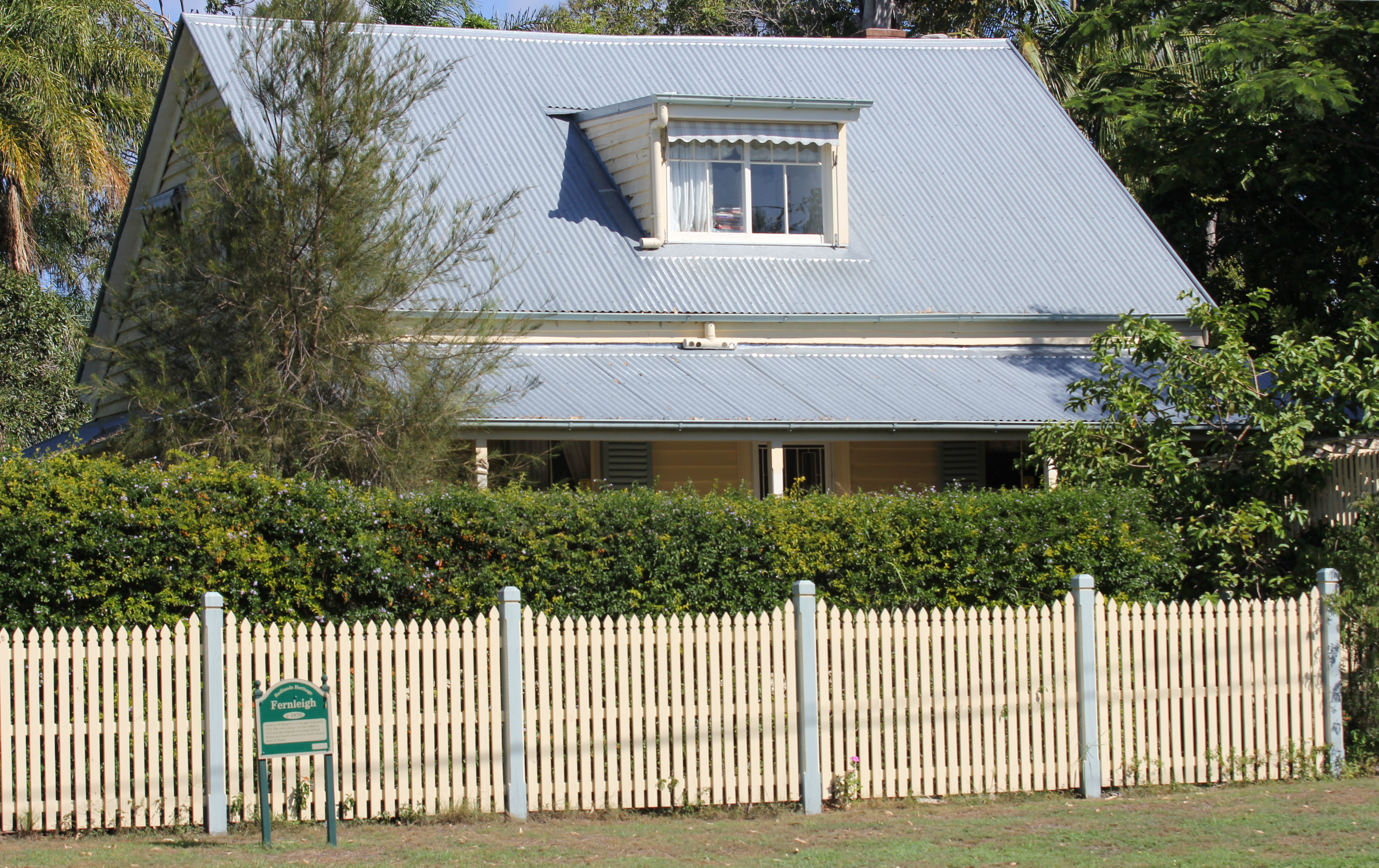
- Fernleigh, 2014

- Location within Queensland Location within Australia
- 27.5249°S 153.284°E
- Location: 73 Shore Street East, Cleveland, City of Redland, Queensland, Australia

History
- Design period: 1840s–1860s (mid-19th century)
- Built: c. 1860s

Queensland Heritage Register
- Official name: Fernleigh
- Type: state heritage (built, landscape)
- Designated: 11 March 1994
- Reference no.: 601374
- Significant period: 1850s-1880s (fabric, historical)
- Significant components: garden/grounds, residential accommodation – main house, views from, kitchen/kitchen house, trees/plantings

Fernleigh is a heritage-listed cottage at 73 Shore Street East, Cleveland, City of Redland, Queensland, Australia. It was built c. 1860s. It was added to the Queensland Heritage Register on 11 March 1994.

== History ==
Fernleigh, consisting of a timber cottage and adjoining timber kitchen house, is located on Shore Street East in the area around the Cleveland Point where much of the early development of Cleveland took place. Fernleigh was permanently occupied from the early-mid 1880s by William Taylor, following his retirement from his business in Brisbane.

The first land sale took place in Cleveland in 1851, and was considered a great success, being described as "...The competition for the Cleveland lots was very spirited...the result [of the sale] shows considerable confidence". At the time of the sale, Ipswich was still a strong contender for the capital of Queensland and there was strong rivalry between Cleveland (promoted by Ipswich interests, supported in turn by the Darling Downs squatters) and Brisbane, as to which would become the port to serve the north.

The allotments on which Fernleigh stands, lots 14–16 of section 11, were acquired in the 1851 land sale by Jeremiah Scanlan, Robert Cribb and William Augustine Duncan respectively. The three men were actively involved in the development of the Moreton Bay settlement: Scanlan as a Brisbane hotel proprietor; Cribb as a baker and politician who acquired extensive land interests; and Duncan, a former Sydney journalist who took up a position as Sub-Collector of Customs in Brisbane from 1846.

As records do not clearly identify whether it was lot 15 or lot 16 on which Fernleigh was built, it is unclear whether it was Cribb or Duncan who actually was responsible for the erection of Fernleigh. It is however, evident that each of these men had an interest in the development of Cleveland and closely followed the debate regarding the future role of the township.

During the early 1850s, Cribb bought much land at both Brisbane and Cleveland land sales, apparently not wanting to "miss out" when the decision between Brisbane and Cleveland was made. Duncan was a strong advocate of settlement at Cleveland, expressing the opinion that "... Brisbane can never be aught but a country village..." and that "...the Government should not hesitate to open a Township at Cleveland Point...".

Locally, it is held that Fernleigh was built during the 1860s as a holiday house for William Taylor, who had arrived in Brisbane in 1849 on Chaseley, one of emigrant ships organised by the Rev Dr John Dunmore Lang. It is possible however, that references to Taylor at Cleveland during this period derive from his purchase of land, in the vicinity of Fernleigh, in the 1851 land sale.

By the late 1850s, Brisbane was finally recognised as the main port for Queensland. Cleveland remained isolated, developing into one of two fashionable Brisbane holiday resorts, the other being Sandgate to the north of Brisbane.

The Taylor family's first recorded connection with Fernleigh is in 1879, when Taylor's daughters, Ellen, Ann and Elizabeth acquired lots 14–15. Also in 1879, Taylor purchased the Cleveland State School building for £9, and it is understood that he moved this building to Fernleigh where it became the kitchen house. Prior to being used as a schoolhouse, the building was a cottage/shop in Cleveland, on land owned by the Hon Arthur Macalister (three times Queensland Premier). It was acquired by the Board of Education in 1868 for use as the first Cleveland State School which opened in April of that year.

Taylor acquired lot 16 in 1882, possibly at the same time he retired from his business (early-mid 1880s). Taylor moved to Fernleigh, where he lived until his death in December 1895. The title to lot 16 passed to Taylor's daughters, and Fernleigh remained in the Taylor family until the 1960s.

The house was proposed to be converted into flats during the 1970s/early 1980s. Fernleigh was acquired by the present owners in 2015.

== Description ==
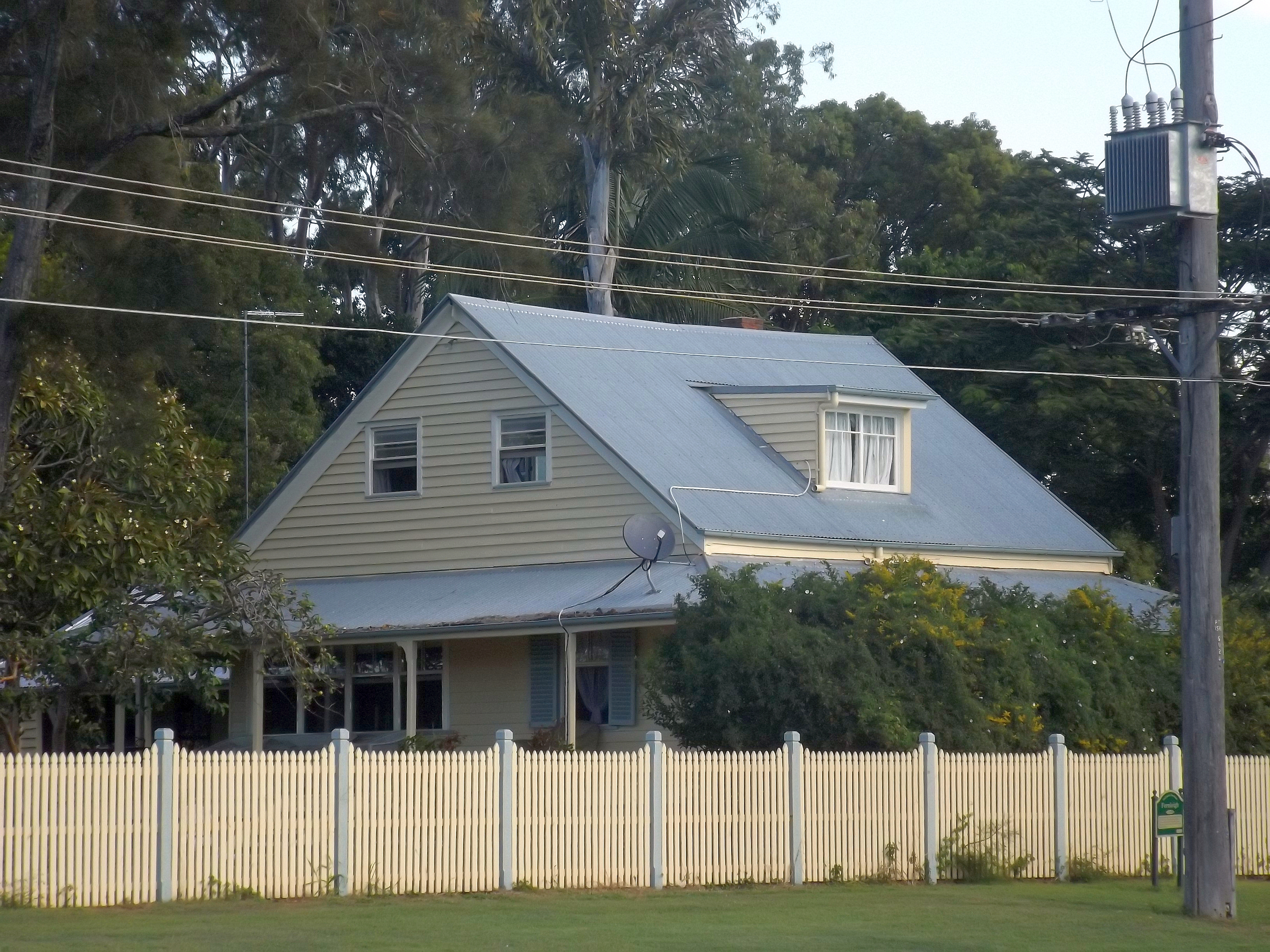
View from Cross Street, 2015

Fernleigh, fronting Shore Street East to the northwest and bounded by GJ Walker Park to the east and south, is a single-storeyed timber residence with a detached kitchen house overlooking Moreton Bay and Stradbroke Island to the east.

The residence has a corrugated iron gable roof, in which an attic space has been enclosed in recent years, with a large dormer window to both the northwest and southeast. The building has both timber and concrete stumps, with a timber batten skirt to the perimeter. It has verandahs to all sides with corrugated iron skillion roofs, boarded soffits and timber posts. The exterior walls are weatherboard and the building has sash windows of cedar, some of which have timber shutters, with a row of more recent silky oak sash windows to the eastern corner room. The southwest corner of the verandah has been enclosed with vertical boarding to form a bathroom and storeroom.

Internally, the building has four rooms with a central corridor. A stair has been added to the western room to access the attic bedroom. Walls and ceilings are of unpainted beech boarding, and floors are of polished beech. A brick fireplace with a timber surround is located in the southern room. The fireplace has had its earlier render removed. The attic has been lined with hardboard sheeting, it has a pine floor and casement windows are located in the gable ends.

The kitchen house is located to the south of the residence and is linked via a covered walkway. It has a corrugated iron gable roof with verandahs to three sides, the southeast wall being of weatherboard and containing a stove recess. The building has both timber and concrete stumps, with a timber batten skirt to the perimeter. The northeast verandah has weatherboard infill below the hand rail, with timber rail balustrade to the northwest and southwest. The verandah soffits are unlined and the southern corner has been enclosed to form a bathroom. The northwest wall of the kitchen house is constructed of split logs laid vertically, and the southwest wall is of pit-sawn vertical boards.

Internally, the building consists of two rooms with a vertically boarded timber partition between. The ceiling is boarded, walls are lined with hardboard sheeting with timber cover strips and it has mainly sash windows.

A recently constructed weatherboard garage with a corrugated iron gable roof is located at the southwest boundary.

The grounds include a very large Fig tree at the southwest boundary, two large Candle Nut trees framing the driveway near the northwest boundary, a Macadamia Nut tree and Black Bean tree to the west of the residence, large Eucalypts near the western and southern corners of the site, as well as numerous smaller shrubs and flowering plants. The northwest boundary has a timber paling fence, with a timber pergola structure over the entrance gate. The northeast and southeast boundaries have wire fences.

== Heritage listing ==
Fernleigh was listed on the Queensland Heritage Register on 11 March 1994 having satisfied the following criteria.

The place is important in demonstrating the evolution or pattern of Queensland's history.

Originally a cottage, the kitchen house was used as the first Cleveland State School prior to its removal and re-erection at Fernleigh. Fernleigh is located on the land which was part of the first survey and sale at Cleveland in 1851 and demonstrates the pattern of subdivision and development of Cleveland along the peninsula.

The place is important in demonstrating the principal characteristics of a particular class of cultural places.

Fernleigh is characteristic of a modest 1860s timber dwelling, having a four-room core and detached kitchen house.

The place is important because of its aesthetic significance.

The timber buildings and established garden have aesthetic quality, and form an integral part of the mature townscape of Cleveland Point.

The place has a strong or special association with a particular community or cultural group for social, cultural or spiritual reasons.

These structures remain as two of few surviving buildings associated with the development of Cleveland from the 1860s, and as such maintain a special association with the community.
