= Fernleigh, Nova Scotia =

Coordinates: 44°42′20.9″N 63°39′50″W

Fernleigh, Nova Scotia is a residential subdivision in Fairview on Mainland Halifax within the Halifax Regional Municipality Nova Scotia on the shore of the Bedford Basin in Halifax Harbour.
