= Old Cleveland Court House =

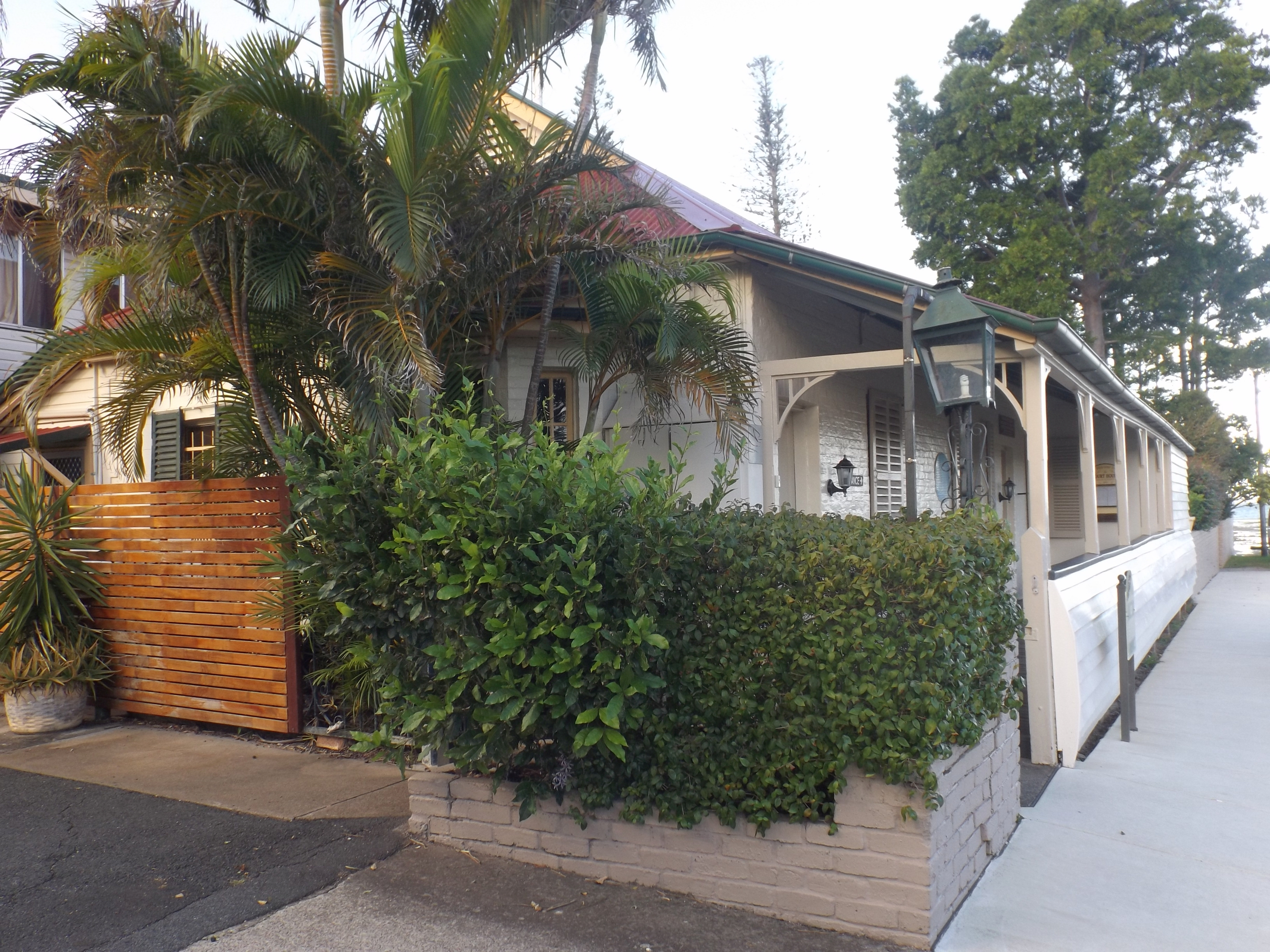
- Front entrance, 2015

- Location within Queensland Location within Australia
- 27.5187°S 153.2879°E
- Location: 1 Paxton Street, Cleveland, City of Redland, Queensland, Australia

History
- Design period: 1840s–1860s (mid-19th century)
- Built: 1853–1977

Queensland Heritage Register
- Official name: Ye Olde Court House Restaurant, Cleveland Court House & Lockup, Ostend
- Type: state heritage (built)
- Designated: 21 October 1992
- Reference no.: 600770
- Significant period: 1850s–1880s (historical); 1853–1900s (fabric)
- Significant components: residential accommodation – workers' quarters

The Old Cleveland Court House is a heritage-listed detached house at 1 Paxton Street, Cleveland, City of Redland, Queensland, Australia. It was built from 1853 to 1977. It is also known as Cleveland Court House & Lockup, Ostend and Ye Olde Court House Restaurant. It was added to the Queensland Heritage Register on 21 October 1992.

== History ==
The brick core of this building is thought to have been erected c. 1853 for Hon. Francis Edward Bigge, Member of the New South Wales Legislative Assembly and his brother Frederick William Bigge, following their purchase of the site in January 1852.

At the time, the Bigges were developing a number of trading, timber, warehousing and maritime activities at Cleveland Point, which had served as the port for Dunwich during the penal settlement of Moreton Bay. It is thought this building was erected as quarters for their workers at the Point.

Later the building was rented to the Commissioner of Police as the residence, court house and lockup for the district constabulary, until about 1880.

William Davidson Ross, a retired Brisbane furniture dealer and later chairman of the Cleveland Divisional Board, acquired the property in 1882, occupying it as his residence. He borrowed heavily against this property from the Queensland National Bank in 1889. By the mid-1890s Ross had returned to South Brisbane, where he died in 1895. The Queensland National Bank subsequently exercised its power of sale over the Cleveland property, and in April 1907 title was transferred to Charles Frederick Allen of Cleveland.

Extensions to the building appear to have been made in the late nineteenth century or early twentieth century.

The building remained a residence until the early 1960s, when converted into tearooms. When a large extension incorporating a restaurant and living quarters was added in 1977 to the northern elevation, the building assumed its present form and function as a restaurant.

== Description ==
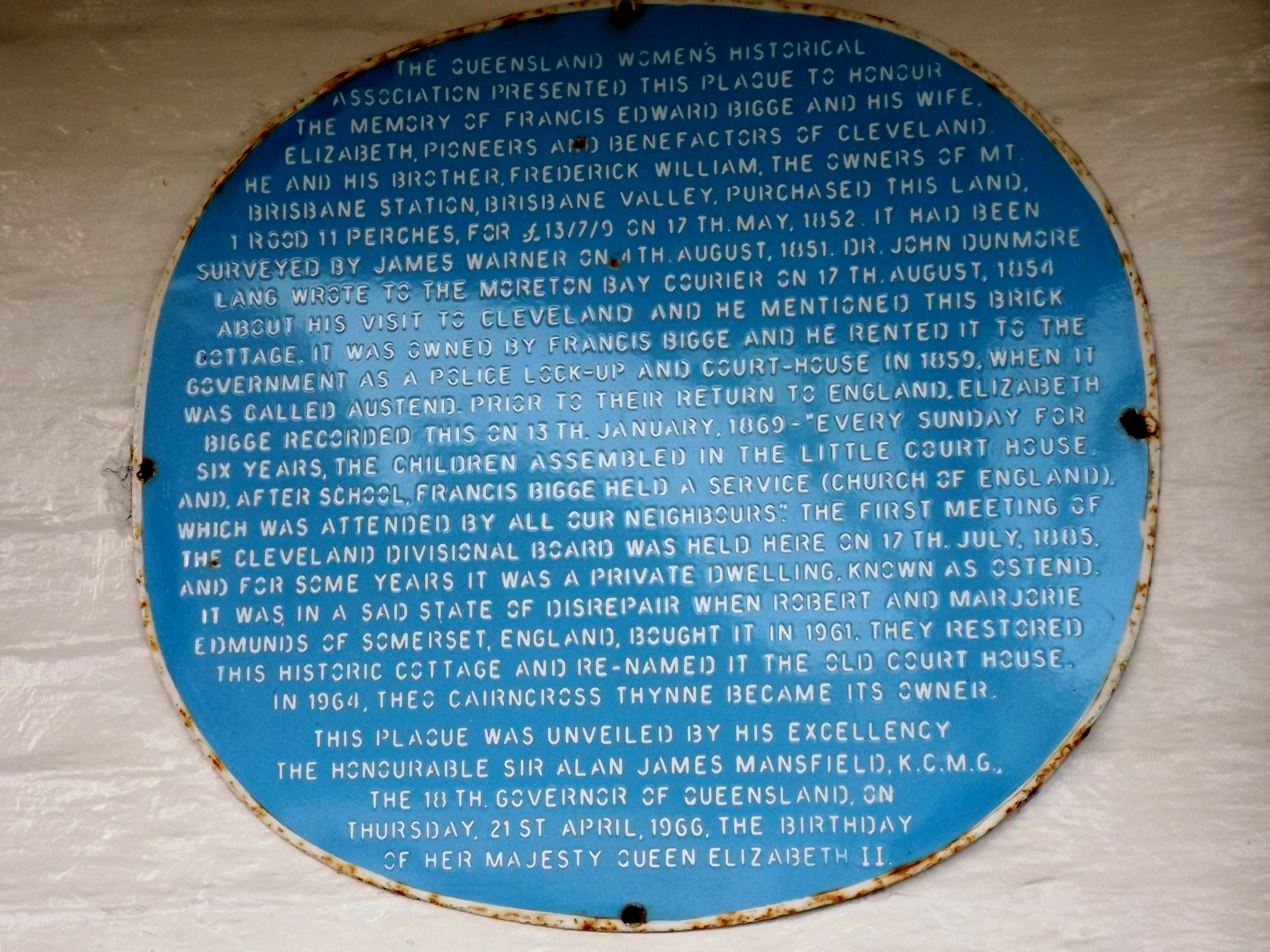
Plaque

The former court house, (the earliest section of what is now an extended restaurant), is a single-storeyed painted brick building. It is a compact rectangular form, low set and abutting the footpath line, where Paxton Street leads down to Moreton Bay.

The hipped corrugated iron roof is bell-cast over the front and former verandah spaces along the rear and eastern side. On the western end, the hip incorporates a timber louvred ridge gable, with curved metal finial.

The front verandah is sheeted to sill height with weather-boards, in a bowed profile, fixed to shaped studs. The floor is timber boarded, and the roof unlined. Of a likely original six bays, four and part of the fifth remain open, with simple timber posts and brackets. Over remaining bays weatherboarding continues full height.

Windows in the front wall are six-paned sashes, opening inwards. Sills are of unpainted stone. Rear wall windows, now internal within the restaurant extension, are four-paned sashes. A bay window projects from the western wall. The sill is precisely shaped, painted masonry. Adjoining this bay, the wall is rendered, and ruled with stone course lines.

Internal walls are of painted brick, generally in English bond. Two are built in stretcher bond. Moulded cornices are consistent throughout. Ceilings are tongue and groove boarding. Circular fretwork vents are central to five existing ceilings. An unpainted brick fireplace remains in seasonal use. A second fireplace, originally from the Bellevue Hotel in Brisbane, has been installed in the enclosed verandah space adjoining the restaurant extension. The new section incorporates other relics of historic buildings. It extends the restaurant into an L-shape, around a recent paved and planted courtyard.

Ye Olde Court House Restaurant retains a significant historic form, in the early low-set open verandah abutting Paxton Street.

== Heritage listing ==
The Old Cleveland Courthouse was listed on the Queensland Heritage Register on 21 October 1992 having satisfied the following criteria.

The place is important in demonstrating the evolution or pattern of Queensland's history.

The Old Cleveland Courthouse, the core of which was erected c. 1853, is important in demonstrating the pattern and evolution of Queensland's history, being associated with the earliest phase of European settlement at Cleveland, and with the establishment of the administration and enforcement of European law in the Redland district.

The place is important because of its aesthetic significance.

It makes an aesthetic contribution to the Cleveland Point townscape, in particular the bowed verandah section, set low abutting the footpath where Paxton Street leads down to the sea, which is valued by the Cleveland community.
