= Grand View Hotel =

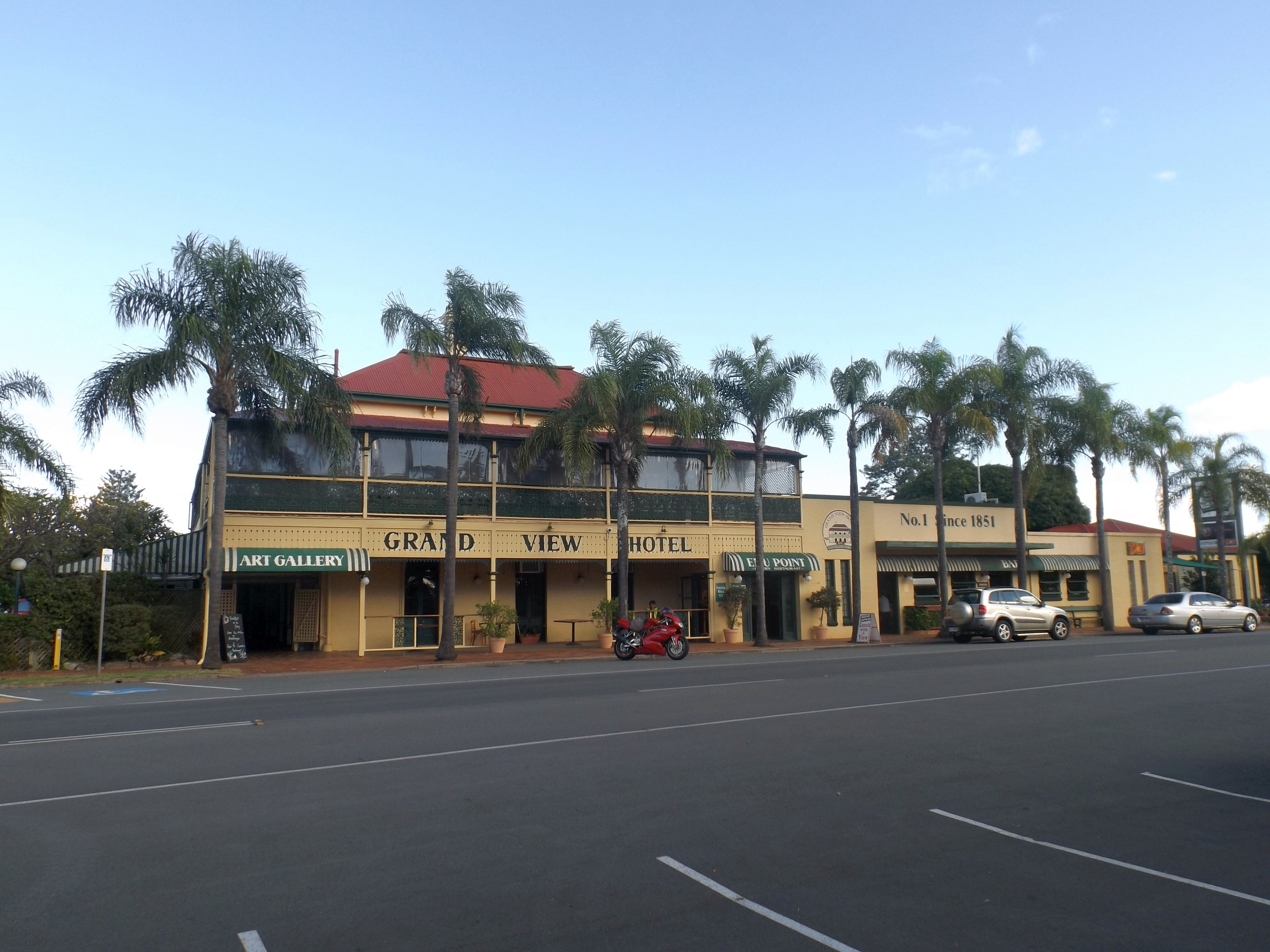
- Building in 2015

- Location within Queensland Location within Australia
- 27.523°S 153.2857°E
- Location: 49 North Street, Cleveland, City of Redland, Queensland, Australia

History
- Design period: 1840s–1860s (mid-19th century)
- Built: c. 1852
- Built for: Francis Edward Bigge

Queensland Heritage Register
- Official name: Grandview Hotel, Brighton Hotel, Cleveland House
- Type: state heritage (built)
- Designated: 21 October 1992
- Reference no.: 600771
- Significant period: 1850s–? (fabric) c. 1852–ongoing (historical use as boarding house or hotel)
- Significant components: out building/s, fireplace

Grand View Hotel is a heritage-listed hotel at 49 North Street, Cleveland, City of Redland, Queensland, Australia. It was built c. 1852 onwards. It was also known as Brighton Hotel and Cleveland House. It was added to the Queensland Heritage Register on 21 October 1992.

== History ==
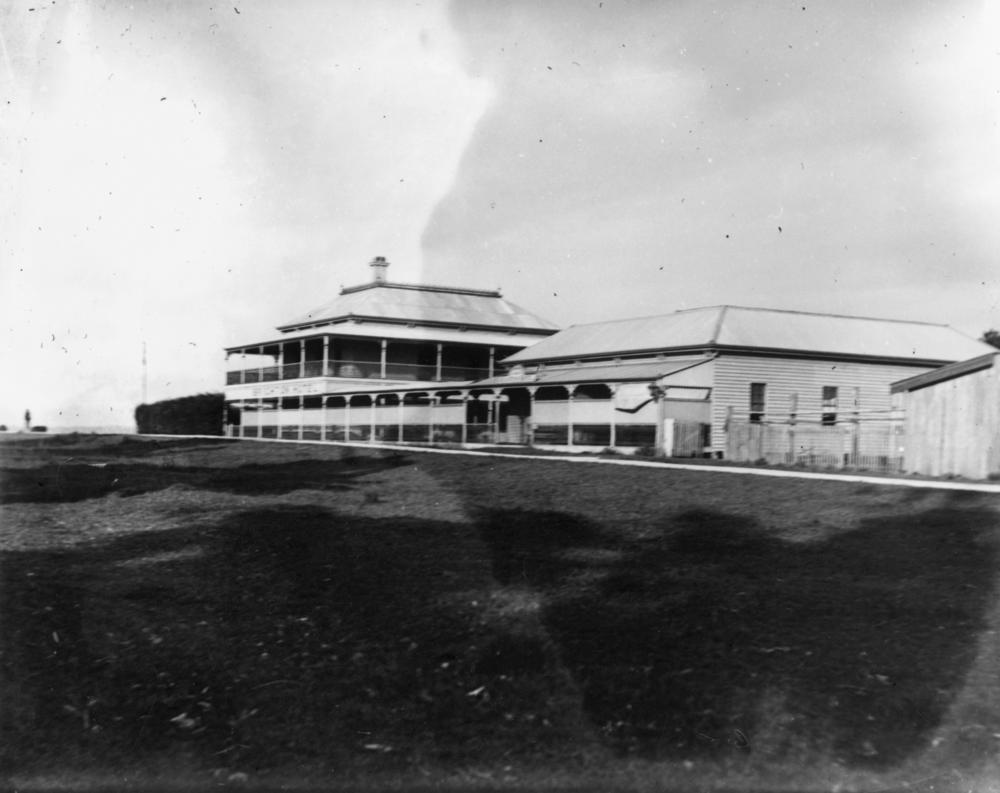
Brighton Hotel, circa 1903

The core of this complex of buildings was erected in the early 1850s for the Hon. Francis Edward Bigge, Member of the New South Wales Legislative Council, who purchased the site in August 1851.

In the 1840s and 1850s squatters from the Darling Downs and Ipswich interests urged for recognition of Cleveland Point, which had served as the port for Dunwich during the convict period, as the port for Moreton Bay. Francis Bigge, a grazier from Mount Brisbane Station, was one of the leading lobbyists. In the early 1850s he invested heavily in industry and housing at Cleveland.

The earliest section of the hotel, built as a prominent demonstration of confidence in Cleveland's future development, appears to have been erected by 1852, but appears to have remained unoccupied for several years. Known colloquially as Bigge's Folly, and formally as Cleveland House, it contained two sitting rooms and five bedrooms with a kitchen and servants' rooms connected via a covered passageway. The core was surrounded by a 3-metre (9.8 ft) wide verandah.

From 1855 to 1860 John Vincent Cassim, a Kangaroo Point boarding house keeper, leased Cleveland House as a boarding establishment. Stabling, a coach-house, store and tap were erected in mid-1860. By 1862 the building had been leased by publican William Rae as the Brighton Hotel, with its own bathing-house and jetty, and 10-metric-ton (9.8-long-ton; 11-short-ton) pleasure cutter.

The building also served as a venue for Anglican services prior to the construction of St Pauls Anglican Church nearby in 1874.

In 1878 the property was acquired by publicans Andrew and Mary Goodall, and the hotel appears to have been extended to the southeast. Major alterations that give the building its present two-storeyed form are likely to have been carried out in the late 1880s or mid-1890s, when the Cleveland railway line was opened to Cleveland Central and later extended to Cleveland Point. It became known as the Grand View Hotel c. 1910, and remained in the Goodall-Singh family until 1936.

Other outbuildings have been added since the 1940s. Five miniature, representational murals on the wall behind the public bar probably were painted in the 1950s, and the complex was renovated in 1982 and again in 1992.

The Grand View continues to operate as a hotel, and is one of the oldest hotels in Queensland in continuous use.

== Description ==
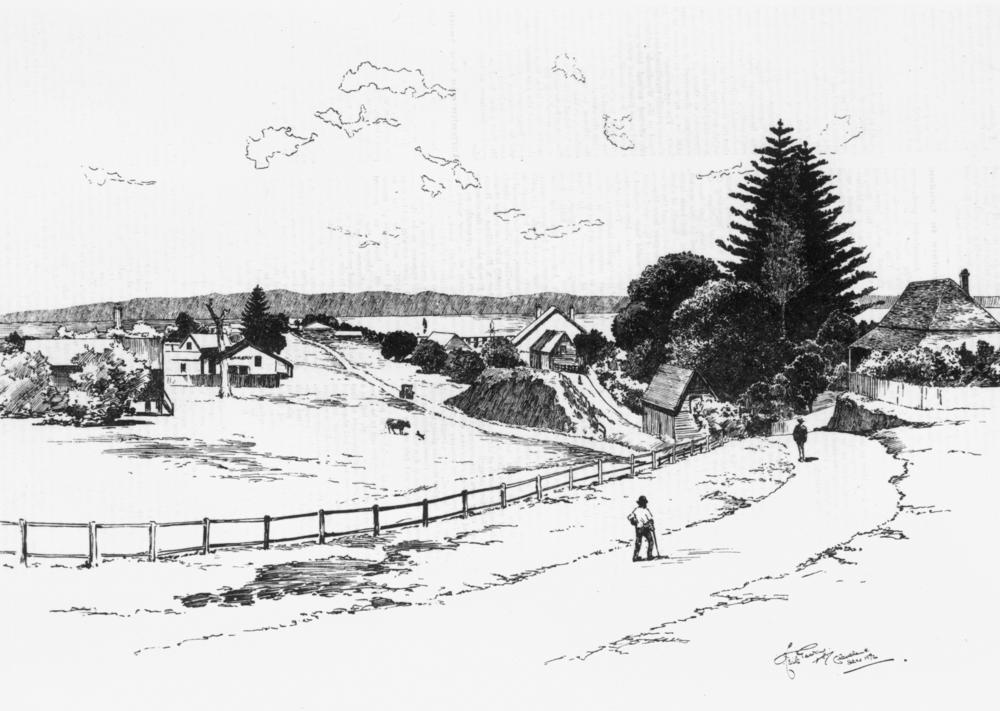
StateLibQld 2 45927 The Grand View, Sketch of Cleveland as viewed from the Brighton Hotel, 1892

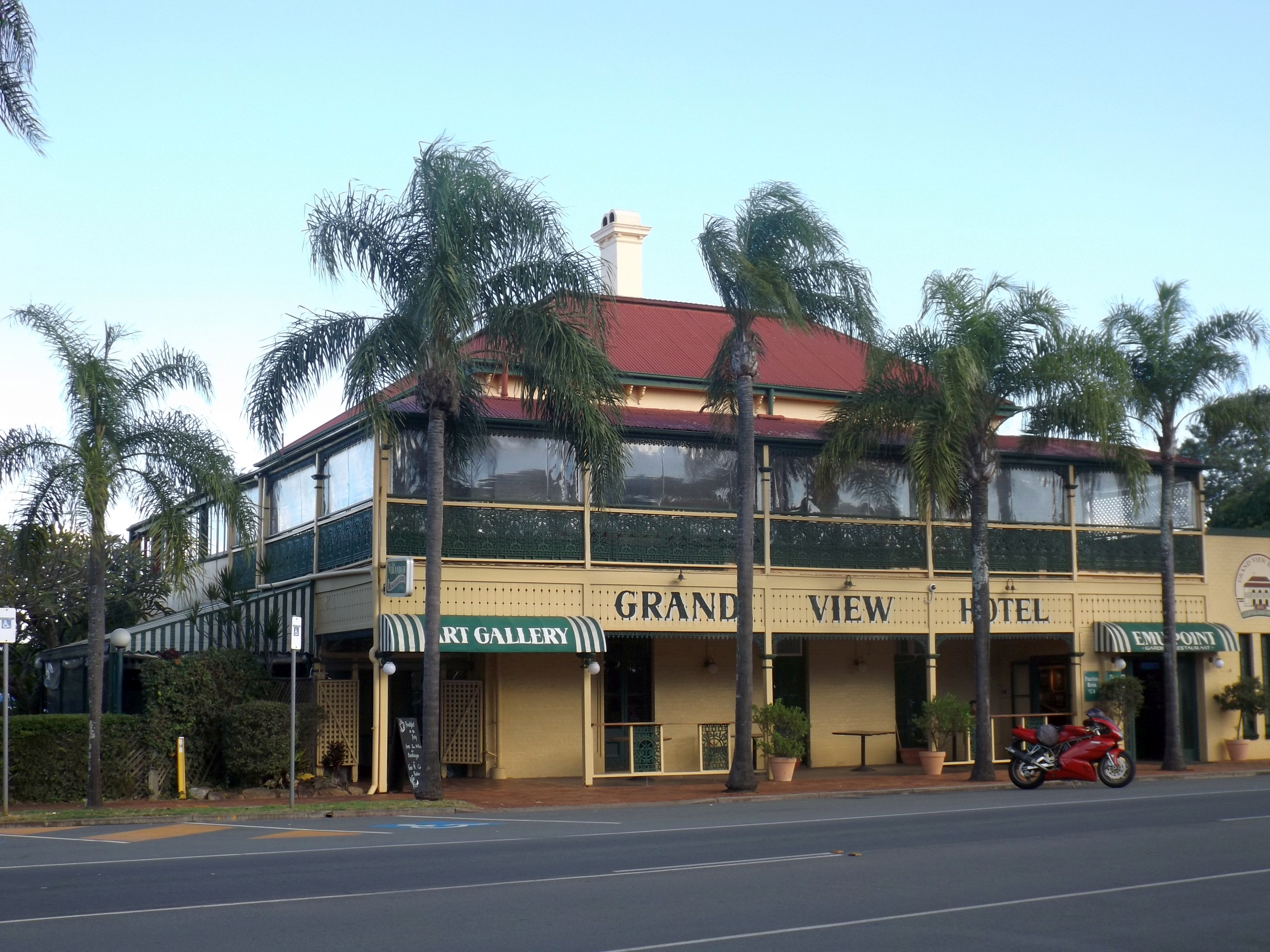
Grand View Hotel and North Street, 2015

The Grand View Hotel, a complex of buildings with a predominant two-storeyed masonry section built up to the footpath line on North Street, is located on the spur leading to Cleveland Point and overlooks water on three sides.

Open verandahs on each level of the two-storeyed section face the street, returning around the northeast elevation. The curved verandah roof is set down below a main roof of hipped perimeter. One chimney rises above the ridges. The verandahs have cast iron balustrade, brackets and valance, alluding to, but differing from, an earlier design. Below the balustrade is a patterned boarded timber frieze. Rear and southwest verandahs are enclosed with flat sheeting.

The principal internal walls are of rendered brick. A wide central hall divides each level. The upper level, structurally intact, includes an ornate fireplace and has been adapted as private living quarters. French doors with fanlights open onto the verandahs, and a spacious stairwell, with painted turned timber balustrade, is lit by skylight through a tapering timber boarded shaft.

The lower level contains reception rooms and a kitchen. A large room with a marble and tiled fireplace opens to the northeast through French doors, with casement windows above, which may date from the 1850s. The main entrance, in the northeast wall, has side lights of clear and red glass with an early stencilled glass fanlight. The main foyer, formerly verandah space, contains some early brickwork free of paint or render.

Abutting the two-storeyed structure, on the southwest face, is a small chamferboard, single-storeyed building with a hipped roof and a separate curved roof over a narrow verandah. It opens on to the beer garden and, internally, a portion of the higher, boarded ceiling remains.

Adjoining these buildings is a complex of rooms, under shallow skillion roofs, surrounded by parapets.

The public bar contains a series of miniature wall paintings depicting local historical events.

== Heritage listing ==
The Grand View Hotel was listed on the Queensland Heritage Register on 21 October 1992 having satisfied the following criteria.

The place is important in demonstrating the evolution or pattern of Queensland's history.

The Grand View Hotel at Cleveland, the core of which was erected in the early 1850s, is important in demonstrating the evolution and pattern of early European settlement in Queensland, its construction illustrating the diverse forces operating within that pattern.

The place demonstrates rare, uncommon or endangered aspects of Queensland's cultural heritage.

It contains surviving evidence of one of the earliest buildings in Cleveland. The Grand View Hotel demonstrates a rare aspect of Queensland's history, as one of the oldest extant hotels in Queensland in continuous use.

The place is important because of its aesthetic significance.

The building is important in exhibiting a landmark quality and contribution to the Cleveland Point townscape, which is valued by the Cleveland community

The place has a special association with the life or work of a particular person, group or organisation of importance in Queensland's history.

The place has a special association with FE Bigge and the movement to establish Cleveland as the port for Moreton Bay, and Ipswich as the capital.
