= Dunwich Public Reserve =

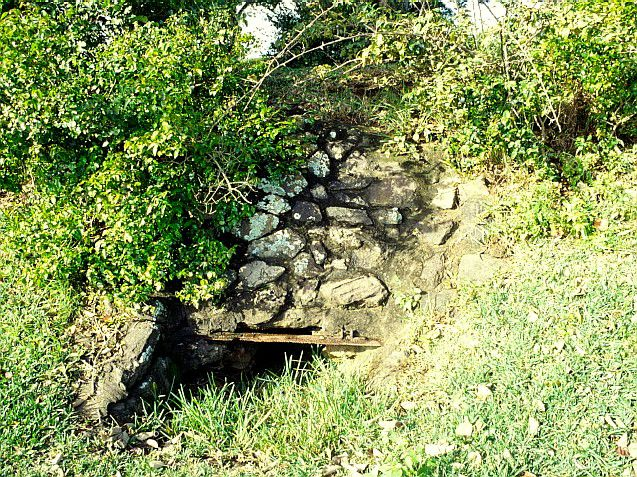
- Convict Privy Pit, 1999

- Location within Queensland Location within Australia
- 27.501°S 153.4019°E
- Location: Junner Street, Dunwich, North Stradbroke Island, City of Redland, Queensland, Australia

History
- Design period: 1824–1841 (convict settlement)
- Built: 1827–1828

Queensland Heritage Register
- Official name: Public Reserve incorporating the Privy Pit and Site of Convict Barracks and Store
- Type: state heritage (archaeological)
- Designated: 25 February 2000
- Reference no.: 602139
- Significant period: 1820s–1837 (historical)
- Significant components: cess pit

Dunwich Public Reserve is a heritage-listed archaeological site at Junner Street, Dunwich, North Stradbroke Island in the City of Redland, Queensland, Australia. It was built from 1827 to 1828. It is also known as Privy Pit, Convict Barracks, and Convict Store within the Moreton Bay penal settlement. It was added to the Queensland Heritage Register on 25 February 2000.

== History ==
The Dunwich public reserve site includes an area upon which a privy pit, convict barracks and store were constructed in 1827 as part of a military and stores depot servicing the recently established Moreton Bay penal settlement.

In 1823 John Oxley discovered the Brisbane River and a recommendation was made that a settlement should be established on its banks. In June the following year colonial administration proclaimed an intention to establish a settlement at Moreton Bay or in the near vicinity. There was general indecision regarding the type of settlement that should take place following Oxley's glowing report of the area. However, New South Wales Governor Thomas Brisbane proceeded with his original instructions to establish a penal settlement at Moreton Bay, hopeful that one day the area might be opened up to free settlement. Moreton Bay was one of four such penal settlements to be established in Australia in the 1820s.

On 1 September 1824 the Government vessel, "Amity", departed from Sydney bound for Moreton Bay. The ship included Lieutenant Henry Miller, Commandant of the settlement; John Oxley, Commanding Officer and Chief of the expedition; Lieutenant Butler, assistant Surveyor; Allan Cunningham, Botanist; general troops and 29 convicts. Approximately half of the convicts had volunteered in the hope they may gain a ticket of leave for their efforts in establishing the first settlement. The convicts were from varied backgrounds including quarrymen, lime burners, bricklayers, marble polishers, stone cutters, brick makers, plasterers and labourers.

On 10 September 1824 the "Amity" arrived in Moreton Bay and following an inspection of St Helena Island, Redcliffe was selected as the site for settlement as originally recommended by John Oxley in 1823. Redcliffe proved unsatisfactory, however, and the settlement was short lived. In late September 1824, the Amity was nearly driven ashore by a fierce storm, prompting Oxley to declare the site an unsafe place to anchor. Following further exploration of the surrounding waters Oxley discovered a safer point of entry into the bay through the south passage between Stradbroke Island and Moreton Island.

In October 1824 Governor Brisbane visited the Moreton Bay settlement and following a journey some 30 miles (48 km) up the Brisbane River endorsed Oxley's earlier recommendations for settlement. It appears that the settlement was officially relocated from Redcliffe to Brisbane in May 1825; however the dates are unconfirmed. Lieutenant Miller established the settlement on the high ground overlooking the Brisbane River, near the current Victoria Bridge location.

Before the move from Redcliffe to Brisbane, John Gray, Pilot of Port Jackson, received orders to survey and buoy the south passage as discovered by Oxley. To maintain the buoys, a pilot was posted at Amity Point on Stradbroke Island. A sandbar at the mouth of the Brisbane River prevented large ships from entering the river and Amity Point became a pilot station at which large vessels unloaded and distributed their cargo to smaller craft capable of navigating the bar and transporting goods into Brisbane. The Amity Point pilot station was the first in the Moreton Bay penal settlement and continued to operate till the wreck of the Sovereign in 1848, when it was relocated to Moreton Island and shipping then used the northern entrance to the bay via Cape Moreton.

In 1827, Governor Ralph Darling visited the settlement and amongst other concerns, expressed a dissatisfaction with the inability of large ships to navigate the sandbar at the mouth of the Brisbane River. Captain Patrick Logan, Commandant of Brisbane, recommended the settlement be relocated to Green Point or Bird Island. On 29 November 1827, Governor Darling directed Captain Logan to establish a military post and stores depot at Dunwich, formerly known as Green Point. Plans and materials were sent from Sydney with instructions to establish a warehouse and accommodation for convict labourers, boatmen and soldiers. The plans were drawn by William Dumaresq, Acting Civil Engineer for New South Wales. In May 1828 Logan reported that the magazine at Dunwich was roofed and nearly completed and the military and prisoner barracks at Dunwich were finished and occupied.

The store compound was separated into two sections by a high dividing wall. The separate store building was used for goods and was surrounded by a high perimeter wall with only one entry point. The barracks were to the north west of the dividing wall and provided quarters for both convicts and officers. The privy was in the southern corner of the enclosure with a shaft constructed down and out to the shoreline.

The outstation at Dunwich only functioned for a few years. In 1830 Captain Logan was killed and in November 1831 Logan's successor Captain James Oliphant Clunie requested that the use of the settlement be discontinued. Clunie confirmed cargoes were still being lost over board during unloading in rough weather, local Aborigines were proving hostile and had killed a convict in the garden and the issue of smuggling had not been eliminated. Following its closure, a small guard remained to protect the buildings and records indicate that timber loading continued there until about 1837.

The settlement was briefly used as a Catholic mission to the local Aborigines from 1843 to 1847. The buildings at this time were reported as being derelict and in much need of repair. The mission was never successful and the last Passionist Father was forced to leave the island after continued threats from Aborigines.

In 1849 Brisbane's penal colony was closed and the military withdrawn. As a free colony there was a need for a quarantine station to protect settlers from disease. Captain Wickham proclaimed Dunwich as a suitable place for a quarantine station in 1850 due to its isolation from Brisbane. Dunwich remained a quarantine station until 1864 and received all immigrants coming to Brisbane. The quarantine buildings are noted as being constructed along a ridge which ran down to the jetty. This ridge may be interpreted today as the parcel of land to the south west of Junner Street.

It is not clear whether there was an intention to use the old outstation compound as part of the quarantine station. However, considering the time that had elapsed since the Catholic mission occupied the buildings and the level of deterioration at that point in time, it is probable the compound would have deteriorated further and as such would have been unsuitable for use as part of the quarantine station.

During the time Dunwich was used as a Quarantine Station one of the most notable and tragic arrivals to the settlement was that of the ship, "Emigrant". Stricken with typhus fever, the ship had already lost 16 people on its journey from Plymouth to Brisbane. While at Dunwich a further 26 people died including the ship's surgeon, Dr George Mitchell, and Resident Surgeon for the Moreton Bay Hospital and Coroner for the Brisbane districts, Dr David Keith Ballow. As the quarantine station had only just opened there had been no time to establish adequate buildings or staff and as such the ketch "Aurora" was sent from Brisbane to Dunwich with tents and supplies.

From 1864, the Queensland government attempted to establish a Benevolent Asylum at the old quarantine station. In 1866 the Dunwich Benevolent Asylum was officially opened at Dunwich. The institution was declared a home for the old and infirm, disabled, inebriates and for a short time lepers. To begin with the asylum used the existing quarantine buildings, however as the establishment expanded these facilities became used for hospital and administrative purposes. There is no mention of the convict outstation during this period of settlement.

A site plan from 1913 illustrates the development of the expanding benevolent asylum at the time of its peak. The development has quite obviously expanded the original quarantine station layout and has been established on the high ground in a "u" shape around a lower lying open space (now the public reserve) which fronts the beach. It is reported that the area was used as a community green space for asylum residents and visitors to the establishment and included a beach swimming enclosure in a similar position to the current facility.

In 1947 the institution was officially closed as a result of overcrowding and deteriorating health conditions. The institution was then transferred to the old RAAF base at Sandgate, and renamed "Eventide". Dunwich was then opened up to government land sales and mining of mineral sands . Ward buildings were sold and either relocated on site or to the mainland. More substantial brick structures were demolished. The parcel of land which once formed the community space was gazetted by the government in 1949 as a public reserve and since that time has stood as the community green space of the Dunwich Township.

The development of North Stradbroke island as a popular holiday retreat and rich mineral sand mining resource has meant the barge landing facilities and surrounding area at Dunwich have undergone continual change since 1947. Whilst not significant, the physical layers of growth do help to illustrate the development of Dunwich and the importance of the site as an entry to North Stradbroke Island.

Despite the substantial development of Dunwich, the remnant structure of the earlier quarantine station and benevolent asylum are echoed in the current town layout. The central community space of the benevolent asylum is now the focal green space of the township and a memorable entry point to Dunwich. The physical remains of the convict barracks, store, privy pit and causeway may still be interpreted and are a subtle reminder of the historical importance of the place.

== Description ==
The Public Reserve containing the Privy Pit and Site of Convict Barracks and Store is bounded by Junner Street, Ballow Road and Cunningham Street at Dunwich on North Stradbroke Island. Looking toward Dunwich from the point of arrival Junner Street dissects an elevated headland. The heavily vegetated, lower section of headland on the northern side of Junner Street was the location of the military post and stores depot established by Captain Logan. Running out to the southwest from this headland and forming the north eastern extent of the barge landing facility is the causeway which was constructed as part of the outstation. The most complete view of the outstation and causeway as they originally existed may be gained from the northern inshore public reserve near the beach swimming enclosure.

It is no longer possible to view the barracks and store in their entirety. Other than the privy pit, which is located at the base of the south western bank of the headland, there are no visible remains of the convict settlement. Today the site is a public park and children's playground, sheltered by an enormous combined fig tree canopy and bordered by vegetation on the south west and north west bank faces.

It is believed that the foundations of the compound may still be interpreted through careful archaeological excavation and examination. The remains of the privy pit are also not extensive. It is reported that the position of the pit may be marked by a slight depression in the soils surface. From this location the pit drops down about 2.2 metres (7 ft 3 in) to a horizontal tunnel which runs approximately 3–3.5 metres (9.8–11.5 ft) before reaching the opening in the bank.

The pit is lined with rectangular blocks of sandstone with stone lintels above. This method of construction suggests a trench was dug from the pit to the bank, lined and capped with stone and backfilled. It has been suggested that the Privy pit was originally designed to be washed out with each high tide. This is now difficult to interpret due to the changes in the shore line contours that have taken place over time. More recent additions to the pit carried out by the Redland Shire Council include a stone apron to the face of the bank and the remains of a steel grille which at one time covered the entrance to the pit.

To the north east of the outstation site is the tourist information centre (located on a separate title) and associated car park. Both the outstation site and the information centre are located in the south east corner of the extensive public reserve which consists of a rugby league field and picnic area which fronts the beach and swimming enclosure. Vegetation is scattered along the perimeter of the reserve becoming more prevalent along the beachfront . It is possible that some of the established plantings may date from the earlier quarantine and benevolent asylum establishments.

From the elevated Ballow Road boundary of the reserve there is a grand view back to Brisbane. From this point the focal and structuring nature of the reserve in the broader townscape becomes more apparent. The reserve is a picturesque community centre and a memorable gateway to Dunwich and the broader North Stradbroke Island.

== Heritage listing ==
The Dunwich Public Reserve incorporating the Privy Pit and Site of Convict Barracks and Store was listed on the Queensland Heritage Register on 25 February 2000 having satisfied the following criteria.

The place is important in demonstrating the evolution or pattern of Queensland's history.

Constructed as a military and stores depot in 1827, the site formed the primary landing place for all vessels coming into Moreton Bay and Brisbane and therefore has historical significance for its valuable role in the early settlement of colonial Queensland.

The place demonstrates rare, uncommon or endangered aspects of Queensland's cultural heritage.

The Privy Pit and site of the Convict Barracks and Store are extremely important and rare pieces of Queensland's built heritage. With the associated Dunwich Convict Causeway, the Old Windmill in Brisbane, the Commissariat Store in Brisbane and the Women's Prison at Eagle Farm it is one of four convict structures known to survive in southeast Queensland.

The place has potential to yield information that will contribute to an understanding of Queensland's history.

Whilst the privy pit and causeway are the only visible signs of the outstation that remain, careful excavation and examination of the site of the convict barracks and store has the potential to yield a greater understanding of Queensland's early convict history.

The place is important in demonstrating the principal characteristics of a particular class of cultural places.

The physical fabric of the privy pit clearly illustrates both principal characteristics of European building techniques and construction methods used by convicts to build a structure of this nature in the early part of the nineteenth century.

The place is important because of its aesthetic significance.

The public reserve has aesthetic and social significance as the central public space of the present Dunwich township and previous Benevolent Asylum. Originally a community green space for Benevolent Asylum residents and visitors, the reserve has been central to the development of the current township since the asylum's closure. Today the reserve stands not only as a village green to the town but as a remnant of the town's development over the past 173 years. Views to and from the reserve and site vegetation contribute significantly to the visual qualities of the place.

The place is important in demonstrating a high degree of creative or technical achievement at a particular period.

Technical achievement is also demonstrated in the design and construction of the privy pit and method by which the high tide was said to have cleansed the pit on a daily basis.

The place has a strong or special association with a particular community or cultural group for social, cultural or spiritual reasons.

The public reserve has aesthetic and social significance as the central public space of the present Dunwich township and previous Benevolent Asylum. Originally a community green space for Benevolent Asylum residents and visitors, the reserve has been central to the development of the current township since the asylum's closure. Today the reserve stands not only as a village green to the town but as a remnant of the town's development over the past 173 years. Views to and from the reserve and site vegetation contribute significantly to the visual qualities of the place.
