= Peter Bishop (captain) =

- Born: c.1780 Bishops Court, Waterford, Ireland
- Died: 1846
- Spouse: Julia Talbot
- Military career
- Allegiance: United Kingdom
- Branch: Army
- Rank: Captain
- Unit: 40th Regiment
- Commands: 40th Regiment (British Army), Commandant of convicts (Moreton Bay)
- Conflicts: Waterloo, the Peninsular Wars
- Awards: Knight of Hanover

Captain Peter Bishop (c.1780-1846), born in Bishops Court, Waterford, Ireland, was the second Commandant of the Moreton Bay Penal Settlement and second Commandant of the settlement of Brisbane.

== Early Service ==
Peter joined the 5th Northumberland Regiment on 24 November 1803 at the rank of Ensign before being promoted to Lieutenant on 1 December 1804 and then to Captain on 12 March 1812. He would transfer to the 40th Regiment of Foot and take part in the Peninsular Wars, being wounded at the battle of Nivelle.

Bishop would also participate in the Battle of Waterloo. Here the regiment took substantial casualties including its commanding officer which led to Bishop taking temporary command late in the battle. He wrote of the battle: "The Duke of Wellington came up at the moment, and we gave him three hearty cheers. I was, from circumstances, in command of the Regiment at the time". For his involvement in the battle he would be awarded the Waterloo Medal.

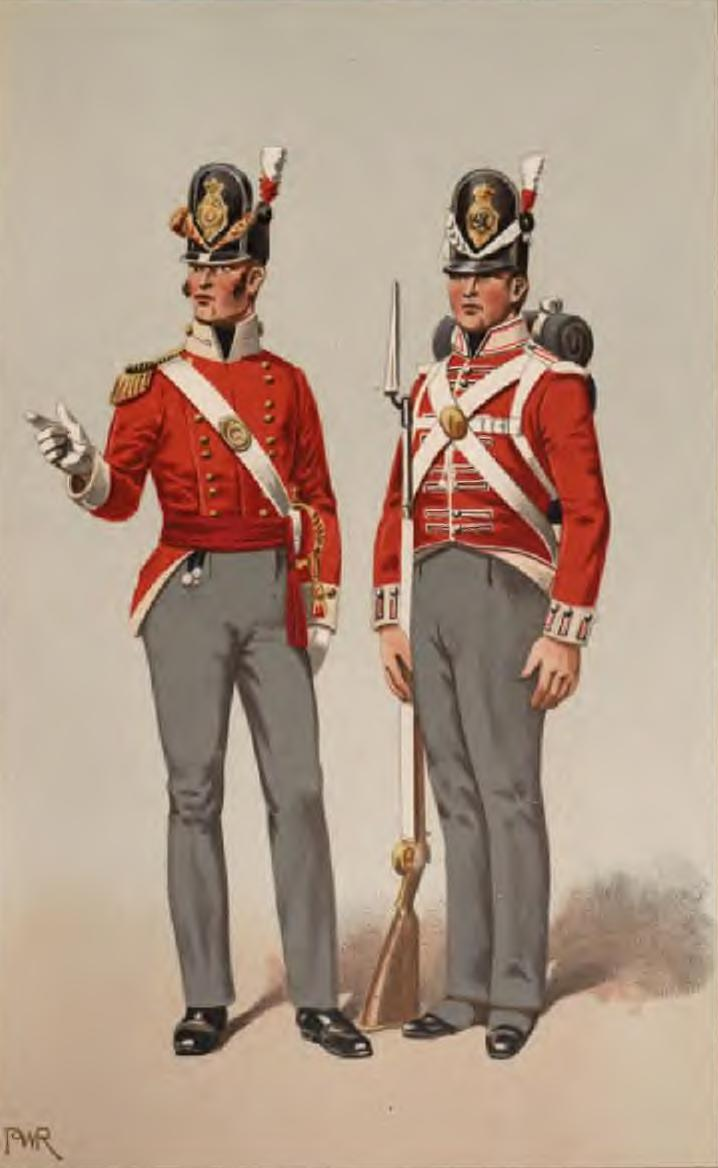
Officer and Private uniforms, 40th Regiment of Foot, 1815

Peter would marry Julia Talbot from Wexford, Ireland, on 7 September 1815.

== Arrival in Australia ==
Captain Bishop would command the military guard of onboard the convict ship Asia II, embarking on the 5th July 1823 and arriving in Hobart in the colony of Van Diemen's Land (now known as Tasmania) on the 18th January 1824.

On the 10th of June that year he would be appointed a juror for a murder trial amongst other officers of the 40th, including one Lieutenant Henry Miller.

During his time in Sydney Captain Bishop would act as pay-master for the regiment. In February 1825, Mary Ann Wise, a wife of a harness-maker was found guilty of stealing 'one thousand pieces of silver coin; to the value of £250' from Bishop's quarters.

== Moreton Bay Penal Settlement ==
In December 1824, Bishop would be appointed Commandant of the Moreton Bay penal settlement, however it would take until August 1825 for him to arrive onboard Lalla Rooka and supersede Lieutenant Henry Miller. Captain Bishop would arrive around the time the settlement was relocating from Redcliffe to a new site along the Brisbane River. He would bring with him one sergeant and 10 privates of the 40th as reinforcements along with 28 convicts.

Both Captain Bishop and Lieutenant Miller (now acting as second in command) would be present for Major Edmund Lockyer's visit to the settlement onboard the Mermaid in September 1825. The arrival of the Mermaid would also be witnessed by an estimated 30 men, women and children of the local Turrbal people from the banks of Kurilpa (South Bank) with Captain Bishop and Lieutenant Miller noting to Major Lockyer that they had not appeared in the open in such numbers before. After Lockyer and the Mermaid departed further downriver, the assembled group swam across the river, somewhere west of the Kangaroo Point Cliffs, where they observed the newly constructed buildings and newly introduced cattle before returning to the other side.

Brisbane River and Moreton Bay, as drawn by John Oxley, 1823

During Bishops command, at least seven convicts would escape; they would be the first runaways from Brisbane. Four would spend over a month on the run before being recaptured upon their reaching the Port Macquarie Penal Settlement. Its Commandant, Captain Henry Gillman would report on the escapees to the Colonial Secretary on the 18th November 1825, noting they had travelled in part via boat. The surviving convicts would share accounts of the 'beautiful country they had passed over' as well as detailing what would be known as the Macleay and Clarence Rivers.

Another convict, George Mitchell would spend an astonishing three and half years on the run before returning to Brisbane in May 1829.

Unlike his predecessor, Bishop would set a precedent for punishment; one John Wilcockson would receive 60 lashes for "insolence and sending an impertinent message to the Commandant" while another, Samuel Lewis would receive 75 lashes for "Stealing a Government sheep, killing it and absconding to the bush".

Bishop would oversee the initial planning and construction of the Commissariat Stores as well as drawing up plans for the Convict Hospital before being replaced by Captain Patrick Logan in March 1826

=== Circumstances surrounding Captain Bishops appointment to Moreton Bay Penal Settlement ===
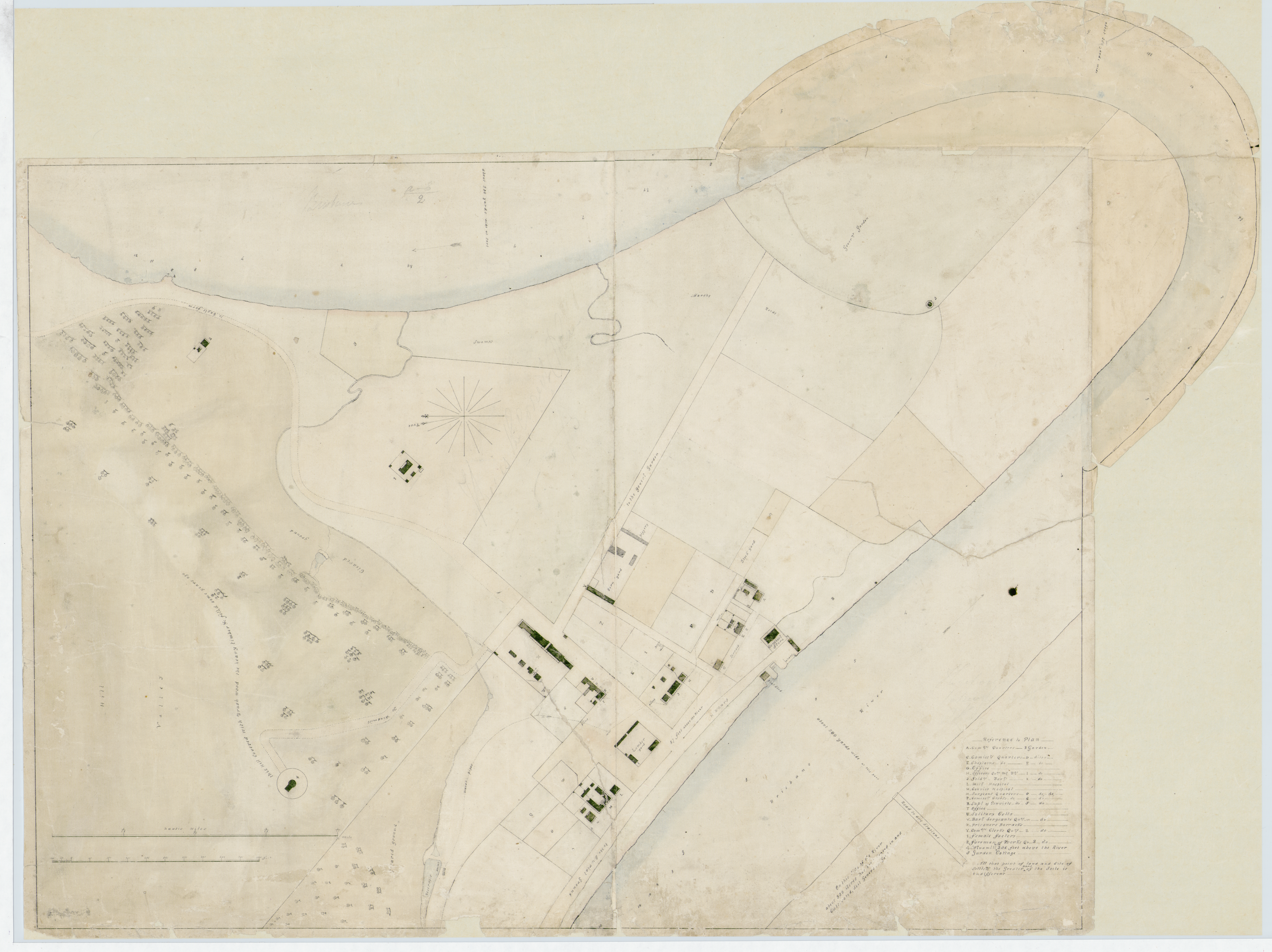
Layout of Brisbane Town, Moreton Bay, c 1839

Bishop's replacement of Miller only a year into his tenure has been the cause of some speculation among historians and by Miller himself. In a letter to Lieutenant-Colonel Balfour, Miller suggests that his removal was "to cover the mistakes of others".

During a brief visit to the Redcliffe settlement in November 1821, Sir Brisbane found it struggling with sickness and malnutrition, and concluded that Miller had "demonstrated little exertion... in the duties of his appointment".

In the same letter to Balfour, Miller cites the mistakes and struggles of the Redcliffe settlement which were apparent to Governor Brisbane were instead caused by poor planning and provisioning from Sydney: "so little were our wants attended to, that our supply of flour totally failed... we found ourselves reduced to the necessity of living on salt meat and field peas, the baneful effects of which soon became deplorable [sic] visible".

Miller may also have been replaced due to his perceived insubordination. Miller, recognising Redcliffe as a failure, was instrumental in proactively seeking out a new, better location. Governor Brisbane and surveyor-general John Oxley supported Miller's wish to relocate the penal settlement to Brisbane River, and chose a new site possibly around present-day New Farm, Newstead or Hamilton. Contrary to their decision, Miller chose a better location further down the river which ultimately became the centre of Brisbane city.

It is interesting to note that upon his arrival, Bishop backed Miller's choice, stating that "the ground [was] well elevated, dry and contiguous to the fresh water...". Although he didn't attribute the decision to Miller: "...and Sir Thomas Brisbane and Mr Oxley, when they visited this place, pointed this spot out as the most eligible situation for the settlement".

Brisbane may have appointed Captain Bishop to quickly oust someone he saw as defying his orders until a more permanent solution could be found in Captain Patrick Logan. However, this remains mere speculation by modern historians. Lieutenant Miller's replacement could also have simply been in response to the increased importance and growth of the settlement requiring a more senior officer.

== Return to Sydney ==
Bishop would return to Sydney in April 1826 before being sent to suppress the local Aboriginal people who had been amassing in the Lake Bathurst area where three stockmen had been murdered after one forcefully tried to take a woman of the group.

He would travel some 1287 km with a detachment of soldiers in around a month. It would prove difficult to confront the Indigenous peoples, as upon seeing the approaching troops, they would abscond into the surrounding ranges.

Eventually Bishop would confront one of the groups leaders somewhere around Lake George. Communicating through an interpreter, Bishop told the leader that any more attacks on the settlers would not be tolerated and if the order was disobeyed, all of the Aboriginal people in the area would be killed.

Upon returning to Sydney, Bishop was commended by Governor (Sir) Ralph Darling. The Sydney Gazette commented on the lack of blood spilt, which had not been the case in similar deployments.

=== Five Island's Magistrate ===
In July 1826, Bishop was appointed 'Magistrate of the Territory' and given the task of forming a new station in the nearby district of Illawarra. The expedition would set off from Sydney on the 15th July. This decision was made due to fears in Sydney that rival colonial powers in the region (chiefly France) might attempt an invasion of the Colony. It was also hoped by local landowners that armed forces in the area would help maintain peace and order as gangs frequented the area.

As fears of invasion subsided, Bishop would return to the rest of the regiment in Van Diemen's Land, leaving the station for Sydney in December 1826.

== Van Diemen's Land (Tasmania) ==
At the time of his return to the regiment, Tasmania was struggling with economic stagnation and depression as well as violence from bushrangers and the local Aboriginal people. Bishop would support the regiment in attempting to maintain law and order in the interior of the colony.

By January 1828, the regiment was ordered to leave for India. Governor Darling initially disallowed the movement of the regiment as it was feared their absence would leave the settlers of Van Diemen's Land unprotected. Nonetheless, the regiment would set sail in December 1829

== Retirement ==
Bishop would not follow his regiment to India. Instead returning to Sydney to serve on a Court Martial in 1828, that same year he would be promoted to Major. On 12 June 1829 he would retire from the army.

In recognition of his service in the Battle of Waterloo, he would be made a Knight of the Royal Hanoverian Guelphic Order in 1837.

Peter Bishop is believed to have died sometime in 1846, he is buried at St Peter's Catholic Church, Leamington Spa, Warwickshire.
