= William Balfour =

William Balfour may refer to:

- William Balfour (politician) (1851–1896), Canadian politician
- William Balfour (lieutenant-colonel) (1785–1838), officer in the British Army
- Sir William Balfour (general) (c. 1578–1660), Scottish general of the parliamentary forces during the English Civil War
- William Balfour, who murdered three members of Jennifer Hudson's family in 2008

== See also ==
- William Balfour Baikie (1825–1864), Scottish explorer, naturalist and philologist
