= North Stradbroke Island, Queensland =

North Stradbroke Island
- Suburb
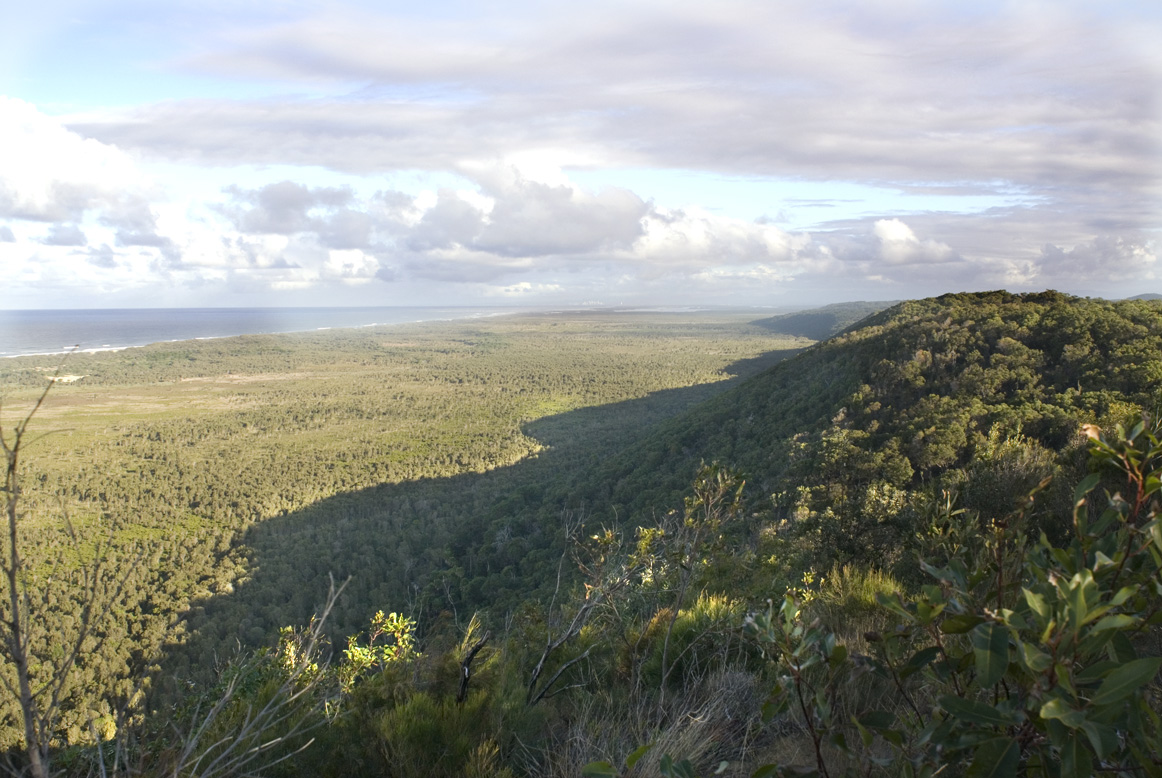
- Eighteen Mile Swamp looking south from the Escarpment

- Interactive map of North Stradbroke Island
- Coordinates: 27.5700°S 153.4466°E
- Country: Australia
- State: Queensland
- LGA: City of Redland
- Location: 13.2 km (8.2 mi) SE of Dunwich; 29.4 km (18.3 mi) S of Amity; 31.3 km (19.4 mi) SSE of Point Lookout

Government
  - State electorate: Oodgeroo
  - Federal division: Bowman

Area
  - Total: 271.1 km^{2} (104.7 sq mi)

Population
  - Total: 181 (2021 census)
  - Density: 0.6677/km^{2} (1.729/sq mi)
- Time zone: UTC+10:00 (AEST)
- Postcode: 4183
Suburbs around North Stradbroke Island
Dunwich	Amity	Point Lookout
Moreton Bay	North Stradbroke Island	Coral Sea
Russell Island; South Moreton Bay Islands	South Stradbroke	Coral Sea

North Stradbroke Island is a locality on part of the island of the same name in the City of Redland, Queensland, Australia. In the 2021 census, North Stradbroke Island had a population of 2,156 people.

== Geography ==
Despite its name, the locality does not include the entirety of the island as there are three other small localities around the towns of Dunwich, Amity and Point Lookout. However, most of the island is within this locality.

Much of the centre and south of the locality is within the Naree Budjong Djara National Park.

Dunwich Aerodrome is approx 3 kilometres (1.9 mi) south-west of the town of Dunwich in the locality of North Stradbroke Island. (27.5189°S 153.4276°E).

== Demographics ==
In the 2016 census, North Stradbroke Island had a population of 131 people.

In the 2021 census, North Stradbroke Island had a population of 181 people.

== Education ==
There are no secondary schools within the locality. The nearest government primary school is Dunwich State School in Dunwich to the north-west. The nearest government secondary school is Cleveland District State High School in Cleveland on the mainland.
