= Dunwich, Queensland =

Dunwich (Goompi)
- Town
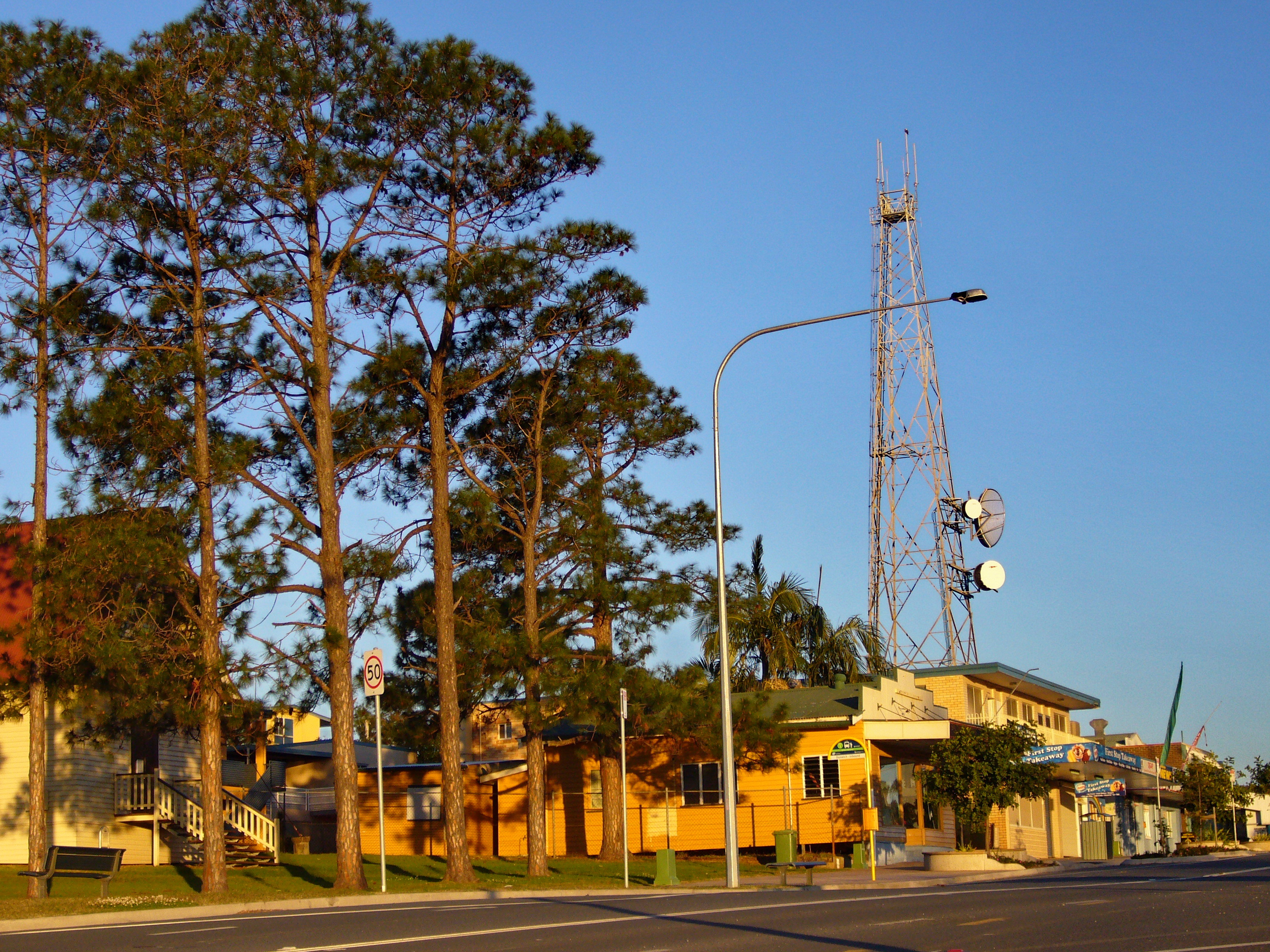
- Dunwich, 2010

- Interactive map of Dunwich (Goompi)
- Coordinates: 27.4992°S 153.4024°E
- Country: Australia
- State: Queensland
- City: North Stradbroke Island
- LGA: Redland City
- Location: 16.6 km (10.3 mi) SSW of Amity Point; 18.6 km (11.6 mi) SW of Point Lookout
- Established: 1827

Government
  - State electorate: Oodgeroo
  - Federal division: Bowman

Area
  - Total: 2.3 km^{2} (0.89 sq mi)

Population
  - Total: 737 (2021 census)
  - Density: 320/km^{2} (830/sq mi)
- Time zone: UTC+10:00 (AEST)
- Postcode: 4183
Localities around Dunwich (Goompi)
| Moreton Bay | Moreton Bay | North Stradbroke Island |
| Moreton Bay | Dunwich (Goompi) | North Stradbroke Island |
| Moreton Bay | Moreton Bay | North Stradbroke Island |

Dunwich is a town and locality on the western side of North Stradbroke Island in Queensland, Australia. Dunwich is part of the Redland City local government area, administered from the bayside town of Cleveland on the Queensland mainland. In the 2021 census, the locality of Dunwich had a population of 737 people.

Dunwich is one of three towns on North Stradbroke Island – the others being Amity Point and Point Lookout.

== History ==
=== Nunukul village ===
Originally known as Goompi (or Koompe) by the Indigenous Nunukul people, it was later renamed Green Point and then Dunwich by British colonists.

Large shell middens around Dunwich indicated that semi-permanent Aboriginal settlement in the vicinity has existed for at least the past 40,000 years. The Dunwich area was used as an initiation site and the population lived mostly off the sea, with fish, oysters and dugong (yungon) being important in their diet and culture. Special nets made with twine produced from tree bark were used up until the 1930s to capture dugong. Attractive dillybags (kulai) were made from reeds by the women of the area.

=== British outpost ===
The first British establishment at Dunwich was built in 1827 as a cargo depot, military outpost and convict station to service the larger nearby Moreton Bay Penal Settlement. The convicts assigned at Dunwich were put to work cutting and preparing timber from cedar logs which were rafted across the bay from the mainland. They also laboured on a cotton plantation formed there and worked to unload and transfer shipping cargo.

Dunwich was named by Sir Ralph Darling on 16 July 1827, in honour of Viscount Dunwich, the Earl of Stradbroke, father of Captain Henry John Rous RN, commander of HMS Rainbow, which carried Governor Darling to Moreton Bay and surveyed the immediate Dunwich area.

Aboriginal people were displaced from Dunwich by this British outpost and conflict occurred between the invaders and the Nunukul around 1830. Two white people were killed and a battle between the soldiers and Indigenous warriors occurred at Naranarawai Creek. Reports vary that this skirmish resulted in a few people being wounded to a massacre of the Nunukul people being perpetrated. In 1832, the convict station and outpost at Dunwich was closed, however it was still used as a timber depot until 1837.

=== Quarantine facility ===
From 1850 to 1864, Dunwich became a quarantine station for in-coming migrants who were deemed to be an infection risk to the population at Brisbane. In 1850, 26 people including two doctors, died at the facility due to a typhus outbreak spread from a quarantined vessel named Emigrant. The victims were buried at Dunwich Cemetery.

=== Dunwich Benevolent Asylum ===
In 1864 the quarantine station was converted into the Dunwich Benevolent Asylum for the elderly and infirmed, one of Queensland's first such facilities. In 1892, a leper colony was established as part of the asylum, but this was moved in 1907 to the Peel Island lazaret. The Benevolent Asylum itself was moved to Sandgate in 1946. The main cemetery on the island contains the graves of over 10,000 people, most of which are unmarked. Other small cemeteries were established for the Indigenous community and the leper colony.

Aboriginal people were not allowed to live at the Asylum or in Dunwich and were instead placed at either the nearby Myora Mission or at One Mile (also known as Moopi Moopi Pa), which was a fringe camp between Myora and Dunwich. Some Indigenous families left the island with many relocating to the Black's Camp, Wynnum. A guarded fence was placed between Dunwich and the One Mile camp. Many of labourers at the Asylum, however, were Aboriginal and had to travel to Dunwich to work. These people became some of the first Aboriginal people in Australia to receive equal wages. In 1944, after a 25-year campaign, the Aboriginal workers gained equal wages almost 20 years before anywhere else in Australia. The Asylum closed shortly after, the equal wages therefore only being paid for one and a half years.

=== Township ===
Dunwich Post Office opened on 22 October 1896 (a receiving office had been open from 1885).

The first school on Stradbroke Island was the Aboriginal school at the Myora Mission which opened in 1892. The Dunwich Provisional School opened on 18 August 1904 initially to cater for the white population. On 1 May 1915, it became Dunwich State School. Aboriginal children were gradually allowed to enrol at the school and by 1924 over half the students were of Indigenous background. The Myora Mission school shut in 1942, with the remaining Aboriginal children being sent to Dunwich. The school later expanded to include a secondary department which closed in 2012, due to low enrolment numbers (6 students).

In 1947, Dunwich was designated a tourist area with land being rented out for holiday housing. In 1950, sand mining companies commenced operations on the island and Dunwich became a place of residency for some of the workers. Local Aboriginal people were also employed by these companies and were gradually allowed to live at Dunwich. By the mid-1960s, most of Indigenous people residing at the fringe camp at One Mile or at Myora had relocated to Dunwich.

Some of the remaining buildings from the Dunwich Benevolent Asylum now form part of the North Stradbroke Island Historical Museum, located in Welsby Street, Dunwich. The Dunwich Convict Causeway also remains, although it has been expanded to accommodate modern ships.

== Demographics ==
In the 2011 census, the locality of Dunwich had a population of 883 people, 48.1% female and 51.9% male. The median age of the Dunwich population was 39 years, 2 years above the national median of 37. 86.2% of people living in Dunwich were born in Australia. The other top responses for country of birth were New Zealand 3.8%, England 2.4%, India 0.7%, France 0.6%, Germany 0.6%. 90.8% of people spoke only English at home; the next most common languages were 0.6% Indonesian, 0.5% Other Australian Indigenous Languages, nec, 0.5% German, 0.5% Yumplatok (Torres Strait Creole).

In the 2016 census, the locality of Dunwich had a population of 864 people.

In the 2021 census, the locality of Dunwich had a population of 737 people.

== Heritage listings ==
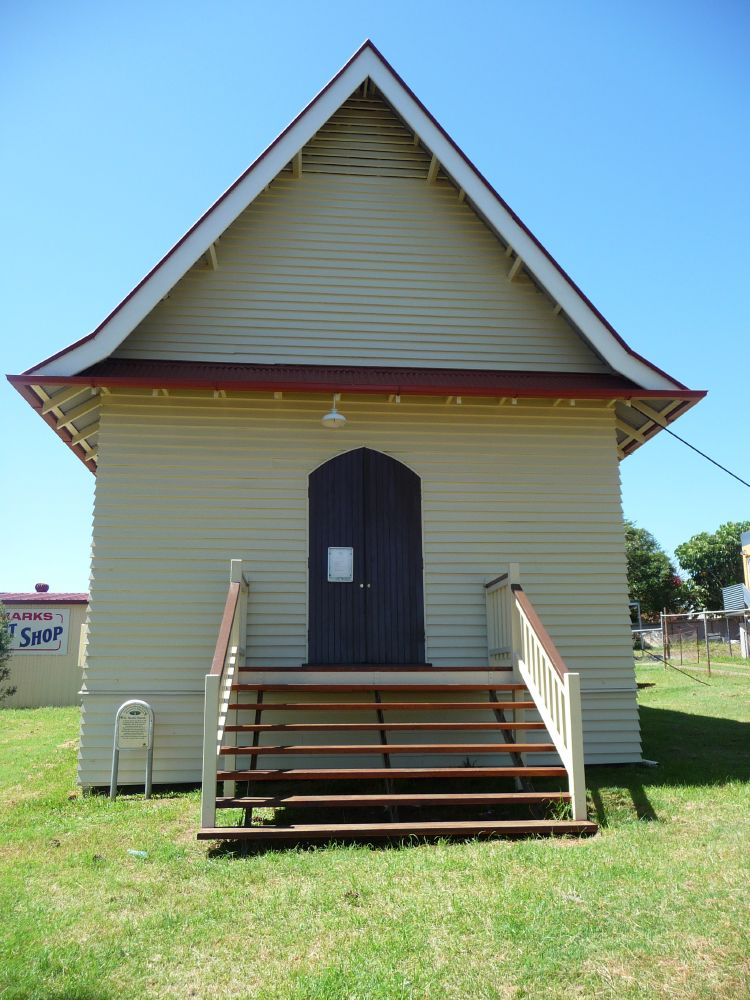
St Mark's Anglican Church and Dunwich Public Hall, 2009

Dunwich has a number of heritage-listed sites, including:

- Dunwich Cemetery, Bingle Road (27.4945°S 153.404°E)
- Dunwich Convict Causeway: Junner Street (27.5026°S 153.4011°E)
- Dunwich Public Reserve, Junner Street (27.501°S 153.4019°E)
- St Mark's Anglican Church and Dunwich Public Hall: Junner Street (27.5005°S 153.4037°E)

== Amenities ==
The Redland City Council operates a public library in Ballow Road.

== Education ==
Dunwich State School is a government primary (Prep–6) school for boys and girls at Bingle Road (27.4960°S 153.4041°E). In 2017, the school had an enrolment of 172 students with 14 teachers (11 full-time equivalent) and 14 non-teaching staff (9 full-time equivalent). In 2018, the school had an enrolment of 177 students with 15 teachers (12 full-time equivalent) and 15 non-teaching staff (10 full-time equivalent). The school includes a special education program.

There are no secondary schools in Dunwich, nor on the island. The nearest government secondary school is Cleveland District State High School in Cleveland on mainland to the south-west.

== Transport ==
There is no bridge to North Stradbroke Island. Vehicular ferries which cross Moreton Bay link the mainland with North Stradbroke Island dock at Dunwich. Mining companies have also extensive barge docking and loading facilities at Dunwich.

Dunwich Airport is a small aerodrome with the IATA code of SRR and ICAO code of YDUN. Despite its name, Dunwich Airport is approx 3 kilometres (1.9 mi) south-east of the town of Dunwich in the locality of North Stradbroke Island (27.5189°S 153.4276°E).

== See also ==
- Redland City
- South East Queensland
