= Moreton Bay Penal Settlement =

Former Australian penal settlement

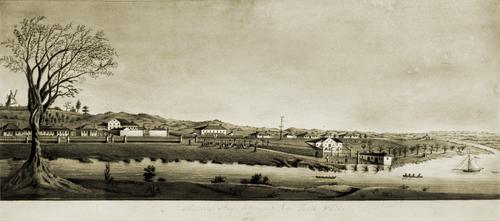
Watercolour painting of Moreton Bay Settlement, 1835

The Moreton Bay Penal Settlement operated from 1824 to 1842. It became the city of Brisbane, Queensland, Australia.

== History ==
The Moreton Bay Penal Settlement was established on the Redcliffe Peninsula on Moreton Bay in September 1824, under the instructions of John Oxley that a suitable location would be "easy of access, difficult to escape from, and hard to attack; furthermore, it should be near fresh water and contain three hundred acres for cultivation". The group of convicts and soldiers were led by Captain Henry Miller, the first commandant, who established the first European settlement in what later became the colony of Queensland. The specific area of that settlement was named Humpybong (empty shelters) by the original inhabitants when the strangers decamped to a more suitable place on the north bank of the Brisbane River, now the heart of Brisbane. After less than one year after settlement, the inadequacy of Redcliffe's water supply became apparent and in May 1825 the commandant Lieutenant Henry Miller decided to relocate the settlement to the current Brisbane CBD.

Located on the north bank of the Brisbane River, the new site allowed the collection of water from a freshwater creek and a chain of water holes near the present Roma Street railway station, the first substantial water supply within 24 km (15 miles) of the mouth of the Brisbane River. This was an elevated location with cooling breezes. The southern bank was a cliff of rock (Kangaroo Point Cliffs), suitable for building material, and a fertile flood plain. The settlement was meant to be a harsh punishment for those who committed another crime, a secondary or colonial offence after having been transported for what was already seen as a serious illegal act. This prison community was intended to be self-supporting. The settlers faced hardship and privation and the paucity of resources combined with thick sub-tropical vegetation made settlement difficult. Between 1826 and 1829, the number of prisoners in the settlement rose from 200 to 1000 and the plight of the convicts whose labour was to establish the settlement was dire.

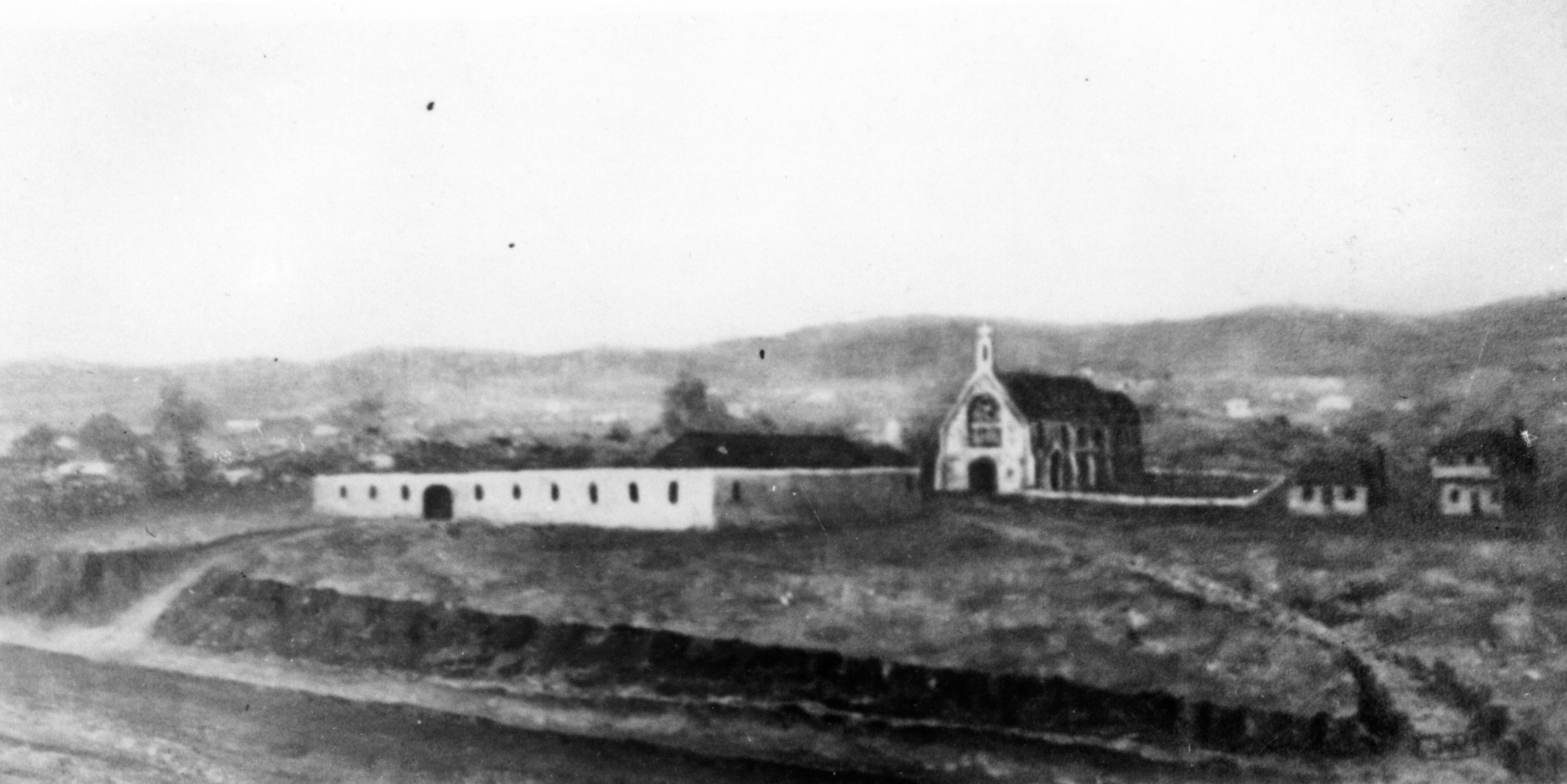
Female Convict Factory on the site of the present Brisbane GPO with Old St Stephen's Church at the rear, circa 1850

The site of Brisbane Town was an ongoing issue, with Commandant Patrick Logan proposing that the settlement be moved to Stradbroke Island. However, the difficulties of crossing the bay saw this plan abandoned. Logan continued to seek alternative sites, establishing a number of outstations including Eagle Farm and Oxley Creek. Despite the continued uncertainty about the future of Brisbane Town, building had continued under Commandant Logan, who is given credit for laying out the earliest permanent foundations. Logan was responsible for the building of Brisbane's only surviving convict-constructed buildings: the Commissariat Store and the Old Windmill.

Convict numbers fell 75 percent between 1831 and 1838 by which time the area under cultivation shrank from 200 hectares (490 acres) to only 29 hectares (72 acres). On 10 February 1842 Governor Gipps declared Moreton Bay open for Free Settlement.

The Moreton Bay Penal Settlement during its 15 years of operation consisted of a range of buildings including barracks for convicts and troops, officers' quarters, dwellings for the Commandant, chaplain, Commissariat officer, surgeon, Commandant's clerk and engineer, a military and convict hospital, the Commissariat Store, and various stores, barns and sheds. The settlement also included a wharf, wells, a flagstaff, gardens and a lumber yard.

The Commandant's cottage was constructed in 1825 on the site of the old Queensland Government Printing Office building (now the Public Service Club between William and George Streets. It was a wooden building with brick chimneys. In 1826 a detached brick building was built to the rear of the Commandant's house. A line of buildings ran from the Commandant's house to the first military barracks along present-day William Street. These buildings included the Engineer's cottage on the corner of William and Elizabeth Streets in what is now known as Queens Gardens. The cottage was associated with the first lumber yard on this block, which also contained engineer's stores and workshops.

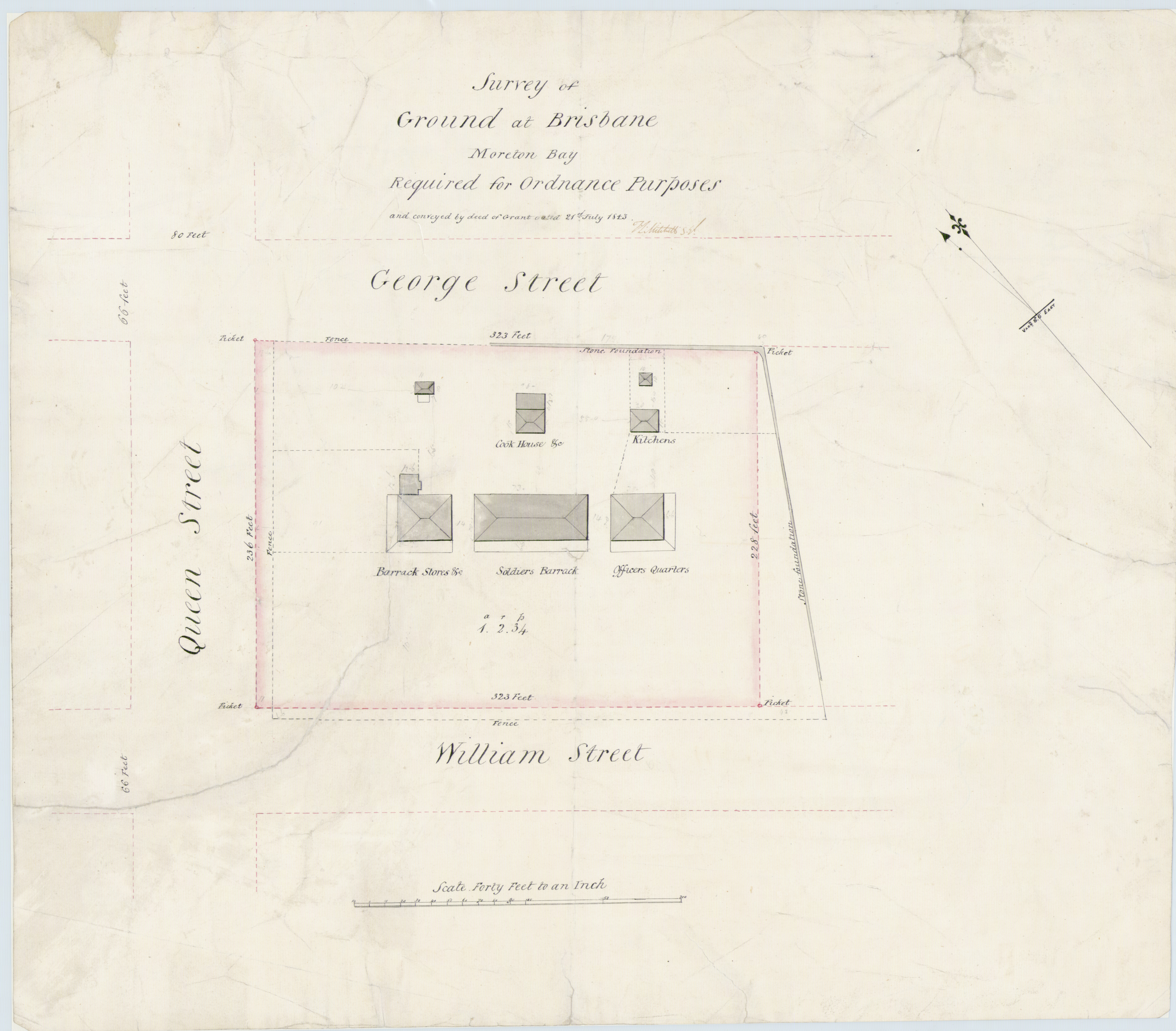
Plan of the Soldiers Barracks, bounded by Queen, George and William Streets

The first military barracks were constructed in 1825 as two slab huts for the sergeant, corporal and 12 privates, and separate huts for the married couples on the corner of Queen Street and North Quay, site of the present Brisbane Square. The barracks were later moved to the other side of Queen Street and replaced by the second lumber yard in 1831. The first prisoner accommodation also consisted of slab huts, probably at the intersection of Queen and Albert Streets; stone barracks were constructed in 1829. The first Commissariat Store was constructed as a long, low slab building near the corner of Elizabeth and Albert Streets and was later used as a barn, after the stone Commissariat Store was built in 1829. The first Commissariat Store appears to have been situated within the alignment of the present day Elizabeth Street.

The only entry point into the settlement was via the wharf on the Brisbane River. Initially known as the King's Wharf, or King's Jetty, it was constructed by 1827 when the boat crew's hut and boat builder's shed were first occupied. A crane was constructed on the end of the wharf in order to transfer goods from the arriving ships to the shore. The wharf was situated on the river bank opposite the Commissariat Store on Queen's Wharf Road. The main thoroughfare into the settlement was up the steep river bank following the present day alignment of Queen's Wharf Road. Pedestrians were able to enter the settlement through the vacant land immediately northwest of the Commissariat Store, in what is today known as Miller Park.

A hospital was completed in 1827, after much government bungling over plans and approvals, on the block bounded by North Quay, Adelaide, George and Ann Streets, with the buildings extending into the current alignment of Adelaide Street. The windmill tower which still stands on Wickham Terrace was likely completed in late 1828, with a treadmill added before September 1829.

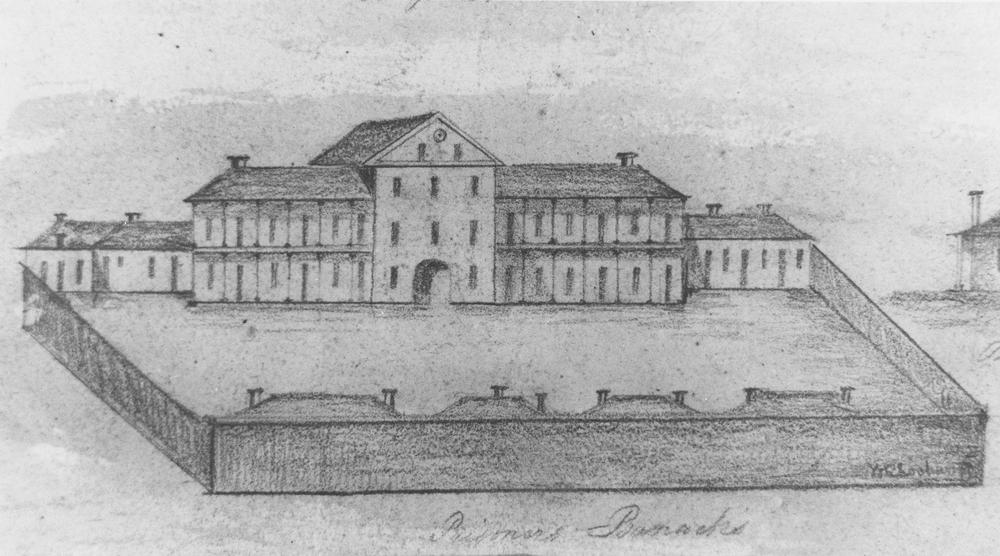
Sketch of the Convict Barracks, Brisbane, 1832

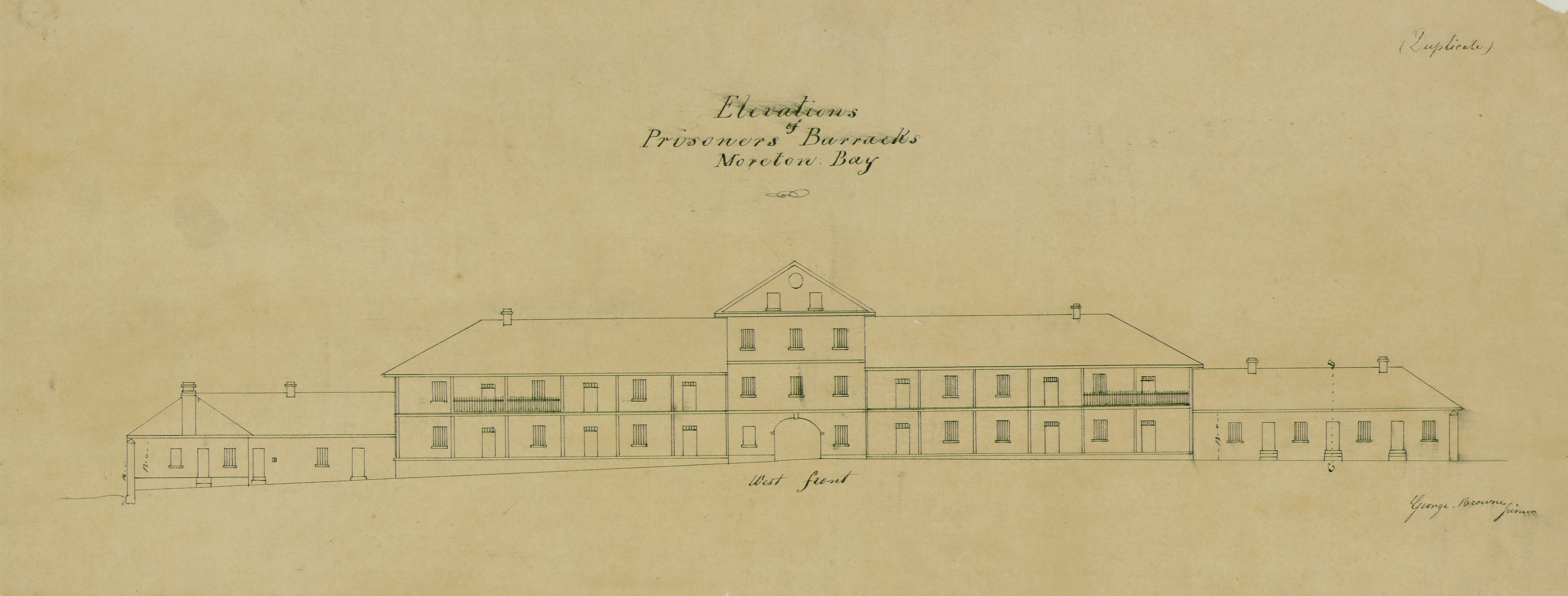
West elevation of Prisoners' Barracks, circa 1839

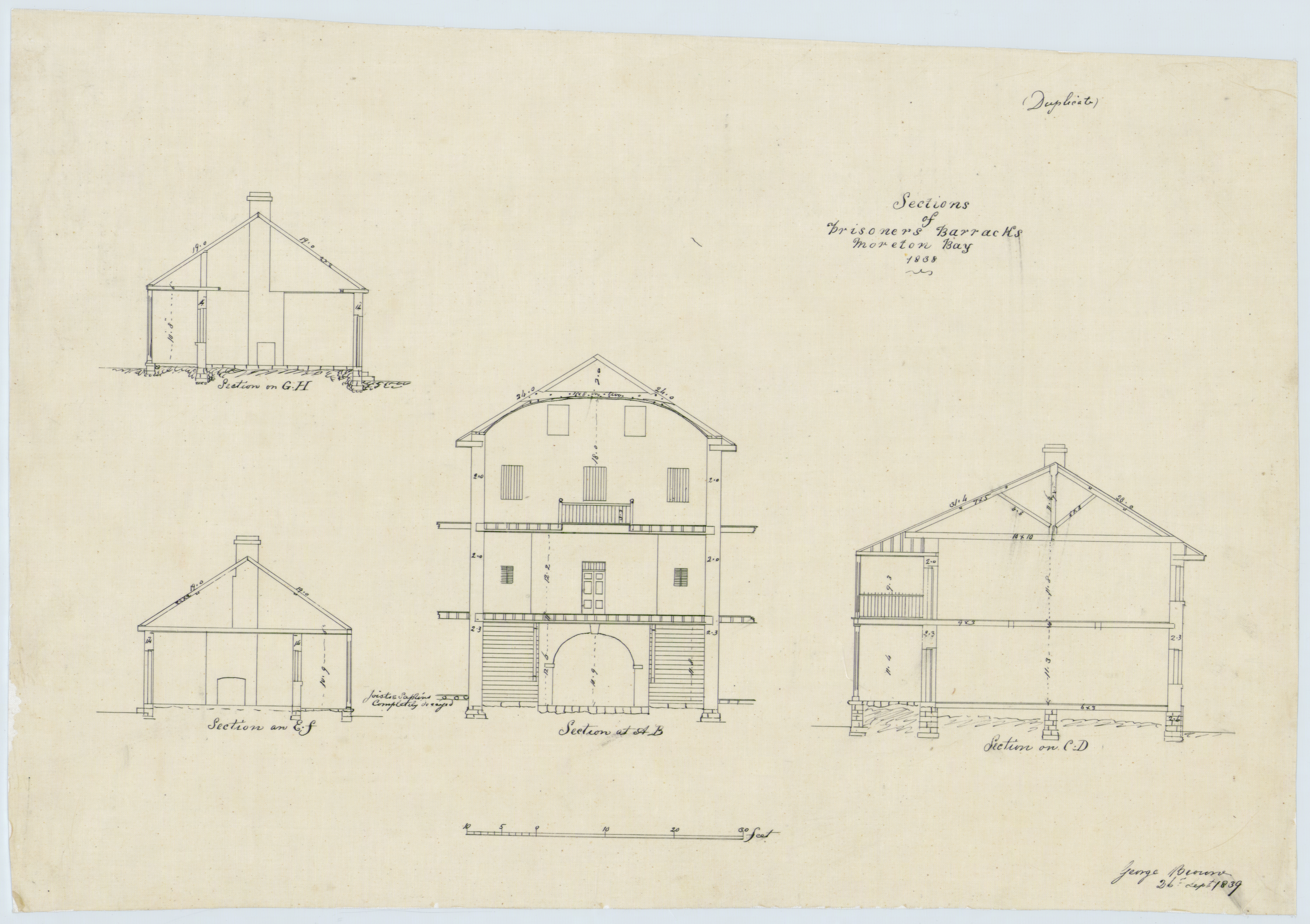
Drawing showing sections of the Prisoners' Barracks, 1839

The Prisoners' Barracks were constructed between 1827 and 1830 to house up to 1000 convicts and was the largest stone building in the settlement at the time. The barracks were situated with the frontage along present-day Queen Street, on the block surrounded by Albert, Adelaide, George and Queen Streets. The barracks consisted of a multi-storey stone building with a central archway and a large walled yard to the rear. Several smaller buildings were situated in the yard on the far side of what would become Burnett Lane.

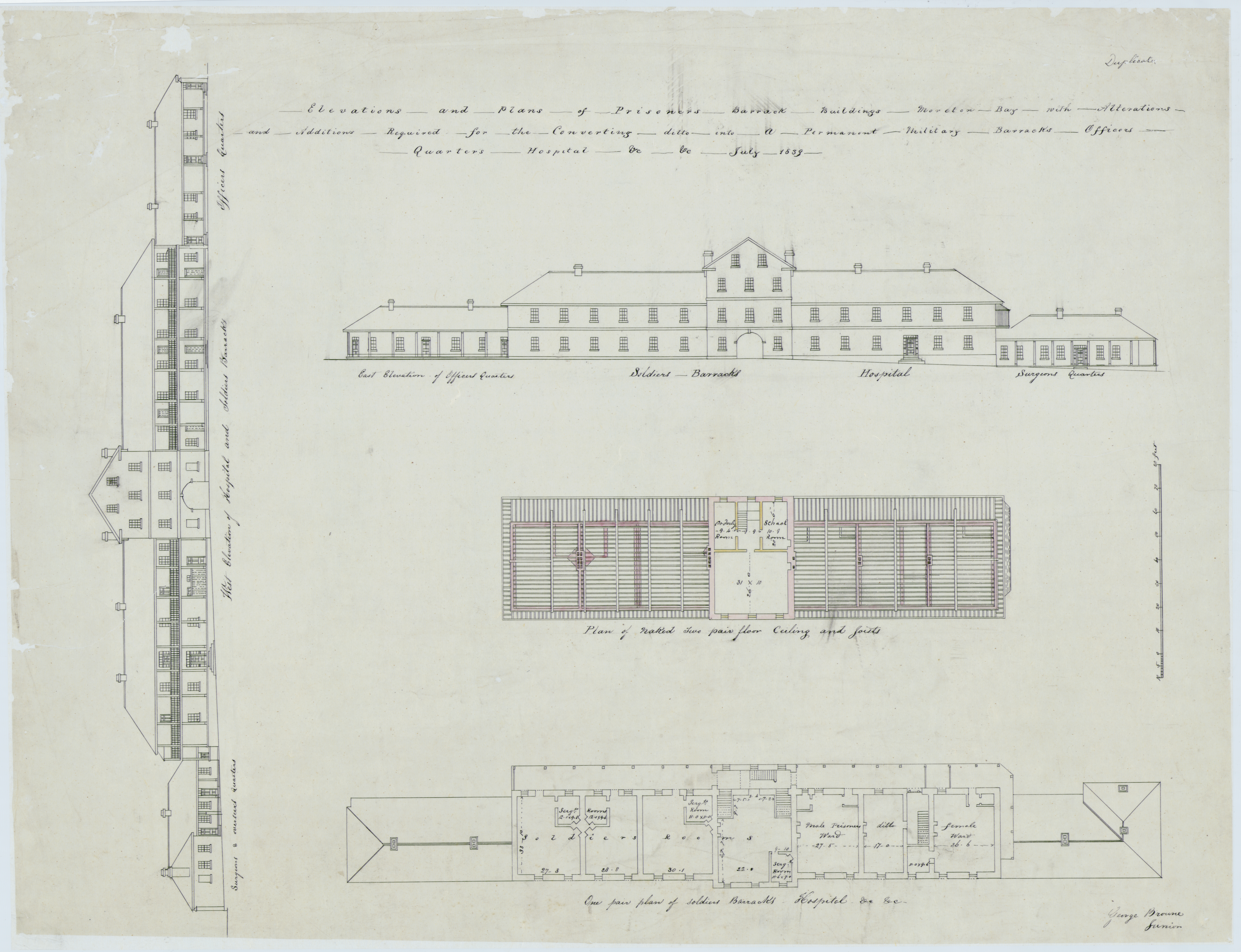
Architectural plans for the Prisoners' Barrack building, 1839

The dominant archway of the Prisoners' Barracks extended approximately 10 metres (33 ft) through the building from the Queen Street frontage towards Adelaide Street opening into the large walled yard. The yard was the site of Moreton Bay's first public execution in 1830. Within the archway itself, strategically situated for all incoming and existing convicts to see, was the flogging triangle. Records indicate that in the period between February and October 1828 alone, over 11,000 lashes were inflicted on 200 convicts; this included 128 sentences of 50 or more lashes. The average in New South Wales was 41 lashes per sentence. The barracks were used from 1860 to 1868 as the court house and for Queensland's first Parliament. The barracks were demolished in 1880 with commercial redevelopment of the area in the early to mid-1880s particularly the buildings along Queen Street backing onto Burnett Lane, many of which are still extant (Manwaring Building, Gardams Building, Hardy Brothers Building, Edwards and Chapman Building, Colonial Mutual Chambers, Palings Building, Allan and Stark Building).

Beside the Prisoners' Barracks, along the Queen Street alignment towards the river, a row of single-story brick buildings were erected. The functions of the six apartments of these buildings changed over time including use as the Commissariat Officer's residence, school room, guard house, Superintendent of Convicts' residence, gaol room, solitary cells, married soldiers' residences, and a military school.

The Chaplain's house was constructed in 1828, halfway between the Commandant's house and the Engineer's cottage, on the site now occupied by the former Lands Administration Building (now Treasury Hotel) between William and George Streets. Described in 1829 as a handsome brick house, it was later divided into two dwellings, and occupied at various times by the Assistant Surgeon and the Commissariat Officer.

The Government Gardens were established in 1828 to the southwest of the settlement on the site of the present day City Botanic Gardens on Alice Street. The garden was under the charge of the Superintendent of Agriculture and produced a wide range of vegetables including cabbage, cauliflower, peas, beans, potatoes and pumpkins, as well as fruit trees and plants such as banana, pineapple, citrus, and apple. The Gardener's house, octagonal in shape and consisting of three rooms surrounded by verandahs, was also situated in the gardens. The route of the roadway along the western end of the settlement from the Prisoners' Barracks to the Government Gardens overlaps with the current Albert Street on the block between Margaret and Alice Streets.

The new Commissariat Store, Brisbane was constructed in 1828 and 1829, on its site between present day William Street and Queens Wharf Road. The two story utilitarian building was constructed of local porphyry and sandstone, with its ground and second floor doors opening towards the river and the wharf. Used for various stores and government purposes over its history, it is one of only two extant structures from the convict period.

One of the major thoroughfares of the settlement, taken by Allan Cunningham in his 1829 survey, ran along the rear of the Prisoners' Barracks towards a pathway up to the windmill tower and to the Kangaroo Point Road. The alignment of this pathway follows the current alignment of Adelaide Street, from George Street to Albert Street, where the original pathway crossed Wheat Creek.

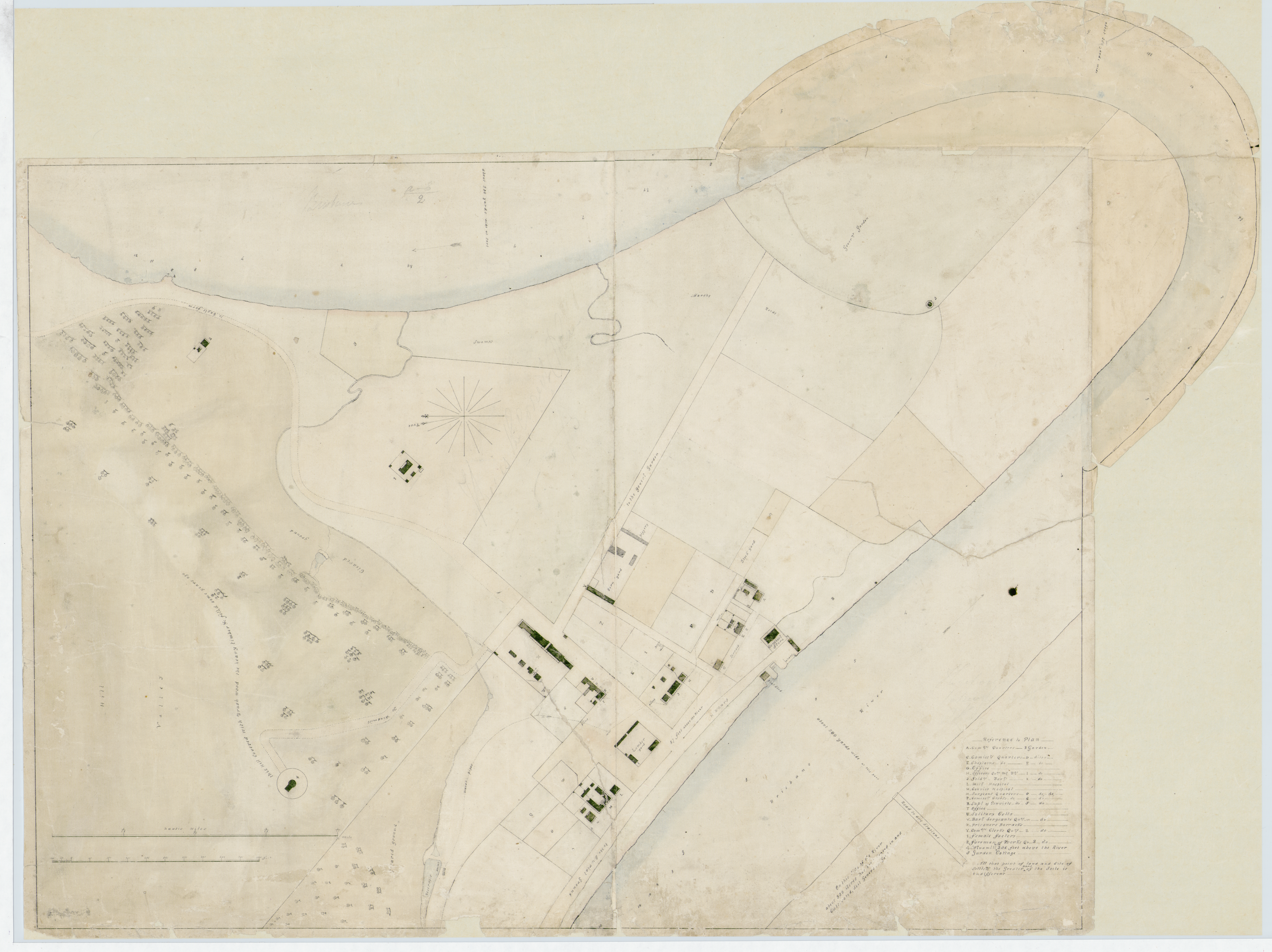
Layout of Brisbane Town, circa 1839

Additional hospital accommodation was erected in 1830/31 adjacent to the existing hospital, situated between present day North Quay and George Street. This included a cottage for the Medical Officer and a building to serve as the Military Hospital. The new Military Barracks were also constructed in 1831. Designed for 100 rank and file, the barracks compound also included a guard house and a dwelling for two subaltern officers. The barracks were constructed on what is today the Treasury Building (Treasury Casino) while the former barracks site (situated at Brisbane Square) was converted to the lumber yard.

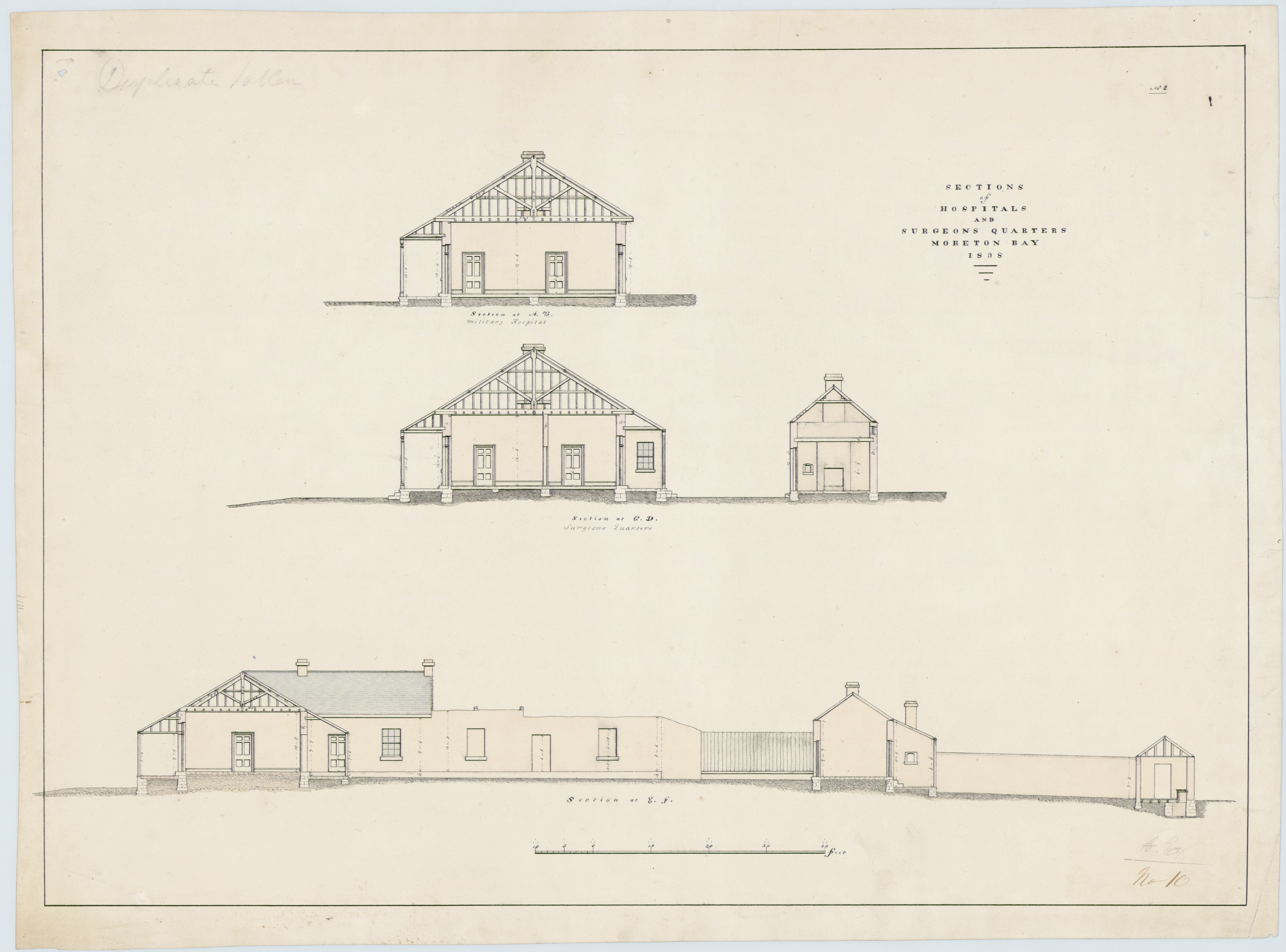
Architectural drawings of the hospital and the quarters of surgeon Dr David Keith Ballow, 1838

In 1839, in preparation for the opening of Moreton Bay to free settlement, surveyors were sent from Sydney to draw maps of the district and prepare town plans so the land could be put up for sale. The town plan undertaken by Robert Dixon (Plan MT3, DERM 1840) is based on an earlier 1839 plan but superimposes the proposed street plan for the free town of Brisbane with square blocks of 10 chains (660 ft; 200 m). Additional features depicted in these plans include a well situated in what is now George Street, near the intersection with Burnett Lane; a flagstaff in the centre of what is now William Street, close to the northwest boundary of Miller Park; and a range of gardens. The garden areas included military gardens and Dixon's garden behind the Military Barracks in the block bounded by Queen, George, Elizabeth and Albert Streets; Whyte's garden to the northwest of the Prisoners' Barracks, through which Burnett Lane now runs; Handt's garden and Kent's garden to the rear of the Chaplain's house and Commandant's house, today overlain by parts of Elizabeth, George and Charlotte Streets; the Commandant's garden adjacent to the Commissariat Store along William Street and down towards Alice Street; and Paget's garden and Dr Ballard's garden adjacent to the Hospital, in the location of George and Ann Streets. Barns and a piggery indicated on Dixon's 1840 plan appear to have been situated within the current alignment of Charlotte Street.

On 10 February 1842 Governor George Gipps declared the Moreton Bay Penal Settlement closed and the district open for free settlement.

In 2009 the Convict Records of Queensland, held by the Queensland State Archives and the State Library of Queensland was added to UNESCO's Australian Memory of the World Register

== Heritage listings ==
The following heritage-listed sites are connected to the penal settlement:

=== Brisbane CBD ===
- Alice Street: City Botanic Gardens, farmed by convicts from 1825
- Skew Street, North Quay: First Brisbane Burial Ground, established in 1825
- Commissariat Store, built by convicts in 1828
- Early Streets of Brisbane, laid out from 1825 during the penal settlement

Archaeological investigations at 40 Queen Street (Brisbane Square) also found remains dating to the penal period. The remnants of the original Commandant's House were also unearthed in the mid 1980s without any archaeological investigation.

=== Eagle Farm ===
- Eagle Farm Women's Prison and Factory Site

=== Kangaroo Point ===
- Kangaroo Point Cliffs, quarried by the convicts from 1826

=== Spring Hill ===
- Wickham Terrace: The Old Windmill, built by convicts in 1828

=== Dunwich, North Stradbroke Island ===
- Junner Street: Dunwich Convict Causeway
- Junner Street: Dunwich Public Reserve

== Commandants ==
The commandants of the penal settlement were:

- Henry Miller, 1824
- Peter Bishop, 1824–1826
- Patrick Logan, 1826–1830
- James Oliphant Clunie, 1830–1835
- Foster Fyans, 1835–1837
- Sydney John Cotton, 1837–1839
- George Gravatt, 1839
- Owen Gorman, 1839–1842

== Indexes ==
NSW State Archives and Records and State Library of Queensland provide access to the Index to the papers of the New South Wales Colonial Secretary 1788-1825 and the Colonial Secretary's letters received relating to Moreton Bay and Queensland 1822-1860. The correspondence of the Colonial Secretary is one of the most valuable sources of information on all aspects of the history of the Colony. The correspondence commences in 1822 during the years of the colony being penal settlement followed by the period after 1842 when the district was opened to free settlers. In many cases annotations on the back of letters indicate the decision taken by the Governor and the course of action taken.
