= Dunwich Convict Causeway =

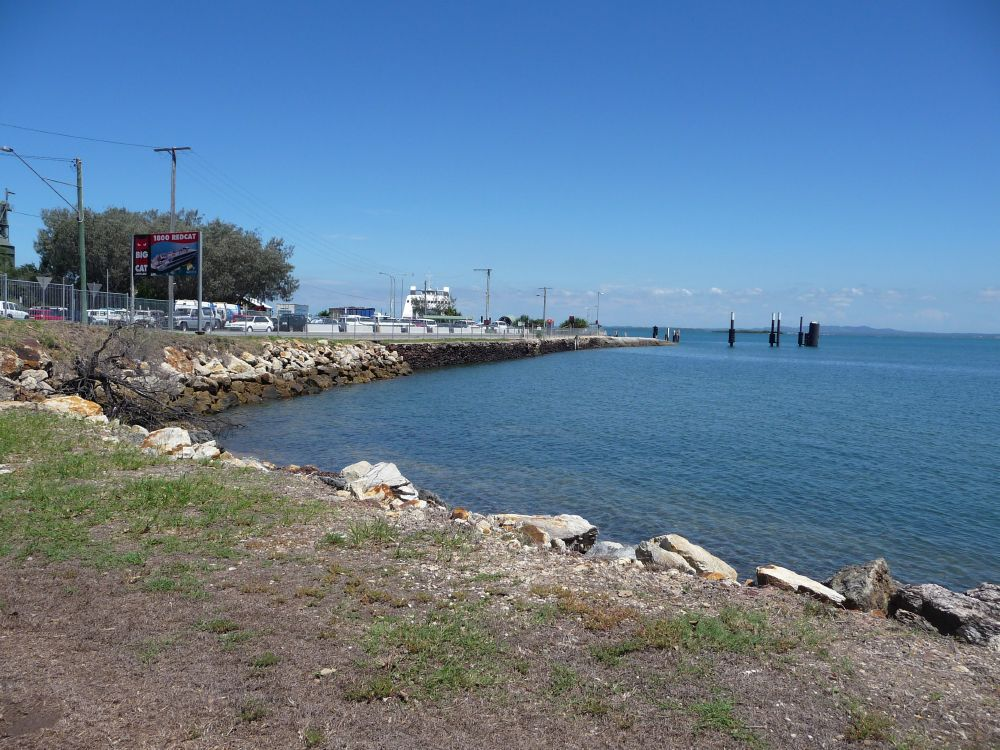
- Dunwich Convict Causeway, 2009

- Location within Queensland Location within Australia
- 27.5026°S 153.4011°E
- Location: Junner Street, Dunwich, North Stradbroke Island, City of Redland, Queensland, Australia

History
- Design period: 1824–1841 (convict settlement)
- Built: 1827

Queensland Heritage Register
- Official name: Dunwich Convict Causeway
- Type: state heritage (archaeological, built)
- Designated: 22 October 1999
- Reference no.: 601021
- Significant period: 1820s (fabric); 1827–1831 (convict period historical use)
- Builders: convict labour

Dunwich Convict Causeway is a heritage-listed causeway at Junner Street, Dunwich, North Stradbroke Island in the City of Redland, Queensland, Australia. It was built in 1827 by convict labour for the Moreton Bay penal settlement. It was added to the Queensland Heritage Register on 22 October 1999.

== History ==
Dunwich convict causeway was constructed in 1827 as part of a military and stores depot servicing the recently established Moreton Bay penal settlement. A sandbar at the mouth of the Brisbane River meant it was impossible for large vessels to carry goods into Brisbane. Consequently, ships unloaded cargoes at Dunwich and smaller cutters carried the goods over the bar and on to the settlement. Following its closure in 1831 the causeway continued to service subsequent developments at Dunwich including a Catholic mission (1843–1847); quarantine station (1850–1864) and the Dunwich Benevolent Asylum (1864–1947). Today the causeway is an integral part of the barge and water taxi landing facilities and has established Dunwich as the gateway to North Stradbroke Island.

In 1823 John Oxley discovered the Brisbane River and a recommendation was made that a settlement should be established on its banks. Redcliffe was suggested as the site for the first establishment due to its proximity to the river entry, central bay location and favourable landing at all tide times. However, Oxley maintained that the banks of the Brisbane River were better suited to a permanent settlement while Redcliffe should be seen as a military post and depot store. This discovery and subsequent recommendation followed Commissioner John Bigge's instruction that a penal settlement should be established at Port Curtis (near Gladstone), Moreton Bay and Port Bowen (north of Rockhampton, 22.5°S 150.75°E). Commissioner Bigge had been sent from Britain to comment on the state of the colony in New South Wales.

In June 1824 the government proclaimed an intention to establish a settlement at Moreton Bay or in the near vicinity. There was a general indecision regarding the type of settlement that should take place following Oxley's glowing report of the area. However, Governor Thomas Brisbane proceeded with his original instructions to establish a penal settlement at Moreton Bay, hopeful that one day the area might be opened up to free settlement. The decision proved frustrating as the British government later confirmed in January 1825 that they intended Norfolk Island to be reoccupied by convicts with Moreton Bay seeming more appropriate for colonisation. Whilst desirable, the directive arrived too late and with an increasing demand for places to send convicts Governor Brisbane had no other option but to establish Moreton Bay as penal settlement. As a compromise Moreton Bay became a place for minor offenders while more serious offenders were sent to Norfolk Island.

On 1 September 1824 the Government vessel, "Amity", departed from Sydney bound for Moreton Bay. The ship included Lieutenant Henry Miller, Commandant of the settlement; John Oxley, Commanding Officer and Chief of the expedition; Lieutenant Butler, assistant Surveyor; Allan Cunningham, botanist; general troops and 29 convicts. Approximately half of the convicts had volunteered in the hope they may gain a ticket of leave for their efforts in establishing the first settlement. The convicts were from varied backgrounds including quarrymen, lime burners, bricklayers, marble polishers, stone cutters, brick makers, plasterers and labourers.

On 10 September 1824 the "Amity" arrived in Moreton Bay and following an inspection of St Helena Island, Redcliffe was selected as the site for settlement as originally recommended in 1823. However, the Redcliffe settlement was short lived. In late September 1824 the Amity was nearly driven a shore by a fierce storm prompting Oxley to declare the site an unsafe place to anchor. Following further exploration of the surrounding waters Oxley discovered a safer point of entry into the bay through the south passage between Stradbroke Island (now separated into North Stradbroke Island and South Stradbroke Island) and Moreton Island.

In October 1824 Governor Brisbane visited the Moreton Bay settlement and following a journey some 30 miles (48 km) up the Brisbane River endorsed Oxley's earlier recommendations for settlement. It appears that the settlement was officially relocated from Redcliffe to Brisbane in May 1825, however the dates are unconfirmed. There was also some confusion regarding the exact location of the settlement. Governor Brisbane had previously approved a location 9 miles (14 km) from the mouth of the Brisbane River. However, instructions to Lieutenant Miller stated that a settlement was to be established at a distance of 27 miles (43 km). It is unclear whether this distance was from the river mouth or Redcliffe. Irrespective, it appears Lieutenant Miller took it upon himself to establish the settlement near the current Victoria Bridge location.

Proceeding the movement from Redcliffe to Brisbane John Gray, Pilot of Port Jackson received orders to survey and buoy the south passage as discovered by Oxley. To maintain the buoys a pilot was posted at Amity Point on Stradbroke Island. A sandbar at the mouth of the Brisbane River prevented large ships from entering the river and as such Amity Point became a pilot station at which large vessels unloaded and distributed their cargo to smaller craft which could navigate the bar and transport goods into Brisbane. The Amity Point pilot station was the first in the Moreton bay penal settlement and continued to operate till the wreck of the Sovereign in 1848 when it was relocated to Moreton Island and shipping then used the northern entrance to the bay via Cape Moreton.

In 1827 Governor Ralph Darling visited the settlement and amongst other concerns expressed a dissatisfaction with the inability of large ships to navigate the sandbar at the Brisbane River mouth. Captain Patrick Logan, Commandant of Brisbane, recommended the settlement be relocated to Green Point or Bird Island. Captain Logan wrote to Governor Darling,

"......it appears to me that Green Point is not only the most eligible situation but likewise possesses every requisite for a penal settlement. The channels from the two rivers unite at this point and there is good anchorage for ships in six fathoms water; if a jetty was thrown out about 150 yards, vessels drawing 18 feet could lay alongside at low water. And besides, there is a small island one and three-quarter miles from the shore having four fathoms close to the beach. I think this would be an excellent site for a store and dockyard; vessels could here be discharged without having any communication with the settlement which would completely prevent smuggling. The boats belonging to the settlement could be hauled up here at sunset, which would prevent any surprise if the prisoners were disposed to seize them. There is a supply of fresh water sufficient for the largest city."

In response to Captain Logan's recommendations Governor Darling wrote to Viscount Goderich, Secretary of State for War and the Colonies,

'With respect to the Settlement at Moreton Bay, its local situation appears to me highly objectionable. The tediousness and difficulty of the access render it extremely inconvenient. From the entrance of the Bay to the mouth of the Brisbane, on the left bank of which the settlement is situated is about fifteen miles, the intermediate space being in general so extremely shoal as to interrupt the Communication. The Settlement of Brisbane Town is at least fifteen miles further up the river, so that much time is lost in gaining the Settlement, and small vessels only, of a light draught of water, can accomplish it. I propose, as a means of remedying in some degree this inconvenience, to form a small Settlement at "Dunwich" on the Isle of Stradbroke, being the southern boundary of the Bay, for the purpose of receiving in the first instance the supplies sent from this for the Settlement, and the Timber, etc., to be forwarded thence to Sydney. According to this arrangement, the Vessels employed in communicating with Moreton Bay will not be detained longer than may be necessary to discharge and take in their cargoes at Dunwich, it being intended to station a small, Vessel at that place for the purpose of conveying the supplies from the Establishment to the Settlement and bringing down the Timber, etc. The Establishment at Dunwich will consist of a Warehouse or large store for the security of the supplies, until they can be forwarded to their destination. A few convict labourers will be kept there and a small Guard of Soldiers for the protection of the Establishment. The removal of the Settlement altogether might be desirable, but the Establishment at Dunwich will render it, at least, less necessary.'

On 29 November 1827 Governor Darling directed Captain Logan to establish a military post and stores depot at Dunwich formerly known as Green Point. Plans and materials were sent from Sydney with instructions to establish a warehouse and accommodation for convict labourers, boatmen and soldiers. In May 1828 Logan reported that the magazine at Dunwich was roofed and nearly completed and the military and prisoner barracks at Dunwich were finished and occupied.

It is believed the stone used to construct the causeway was quarried from the nearby Doctor's Hill and that earth used to fill the structure also taken from a nearby location. Both the rock form and colour present in the causeway are in keeping with the surrounding rock features.

Generally, the materials used in construction would have put together by hand using techniques traditional to European building techniques of the early nineteenth century.

The outstation at Dunwich only functioned for a few years. Based on Andrew Petrie's plan of 1839 it appears the causeway may have been extended at some point during this period. This extension increased the water depth at the causeway end from 4.5 to 5.5 feet (1.4 to 1.7 m). In 1830 Captain Logan was killed and in November 1831 Logan's successor Captain James Oliphant Clunie requested that the use of the settlement be discontinued. Clunie confirmed cargoes were still being lost over board during unloading in rough weather, local aboriginals were proving hostile and had killed a convict in the garden and the issue of smuggling had not been eliminated. Following its closure, a small guard remained to protect the buildings and records indicate that timber loading continued there until about 1837.

The settlement was briefly used as Catholic mission to the local Aboriginals from 1843 to 1847. However, the mission was never successful and the last Passionist Father was forced to leave the island after continued threats from aboriginals. From 1850 to 1864 the site was used as a quarantine station to receive all immigrants coming to Brisbane. One of the most notable and tragic entries to Dunwich was that of the ship, Emigrant (ship), Emigrant. Stricken with typhus fever the ship had already lost 16 people on its journey from Plymouth to Brisbane. Whilst at Dunwich a further 26 people died including the ship's surgeon, Dr George Mitchell and Resident Surgeon for the Moreton Bay Hospital and Coroner for the Brisbane districts Dr David Keith Ballow.

From 1864 attempts were made to establish a Benevolent Asylum at the old quarantine station. Eventually, in 1866 the Dunwich Benevolent Asylum was officially opened at Dunwich. The institution was declared a home for the old and infirm, disabled, inebriates and for a short time lepers. The government steamer, Otter, carrying a captain and 11 crew, serviced the asylum twice weekly from Brisbane. To enable the steamer to birth at low tide a wooden jetty was constructed at the end of the causeway in 1886. To assist with the unloading of vessels a horse drawn tramline was laid from the end of the wooden jetty along the causeway and up through the settlement ending at the kitchen and laundry facility. Other vessels servicing the settlement included coal barges which docked alongside of the causeway. To strengthen and protect the causeway and jetty timber piles and framework were constructed along the causeway face.

In 1947 the institution was officially closed as a result of overcrowding, deteriorating health conditions and maintenance concerns with the "Otter". The institution was then transferred to the newly established Eventide Home on the site of the former RAAF Station Sandgate. Dunwich was then opened up to government land sales and mining of mineral sand resources. From 1947 to 1957 a number of passenger ferries serviced both Dunwich and Amity Point from Brisbane, Redland Bay and Cleveland. The first drive-on drive-off ferry commenced operation in 1964 and ran from Cleveland to Dunwich using the beach as a ramp for loading and unloading. However, with further development and an increase in sand mining a deep water car ferry ramp was needed. Consequently, plans were made to reclaim land to the south east of the causeway providing a place for barge landing. Today this reclaimed land is the site of barge and water taxi landings servicing an ever increasing number of residents and visitors.

The development of North Stradbroke island as a popular holiday retreat and rich mineral sand mining resource has meant the barge landing facilities at Dunwich have undergone continual change since 1947. Whilst not significant and sometimes destructive, the physical layers of growth do help to illustrate the development of Dunwich and the importance of the causeway site as an entry to North Stradbroke Island. Despite substantial additions to the south east side of the causeway the structure and the historical layers of the place remain intact.

== Description ==
Dunwich convict causeway is located at the end of Junner Street, Dunwich on North Stradbroke Island. On arrival at Dunwich the causeway is not visibly obvious as it forms the northern extent of the landing area which is obscured from view. Further investigation reveals the causeway is still an intact and integral part of the barge and water taxi landing facilities. The causeway itself functions largely as a pedestrian access for people walking out to catch the barge or water taxi. The reclaimed land to the south of the causeway carries all vehicular traffic to the barge. Recent community landscape projects have assisted in establishing a native vegetated boundary between the vehicular traffic area and the causeway thus helping to delineate between the old and the new.

Looking along the causeway toward Dunwich Junner Street dissects an elevated headland. The heavily vegetated, lower section of headland on the northern side of Junner Street was once the location of the military post and stores depot established by Captain Logan at the same time as the causeway. On the other side of Junner street is a higher section of headland referred to as Doctor's Hill. Whilst the area has undergone significant change the causeway has remained constant and played an important role in establishing Dunwich as the point of entry to North Stradbroke Island as well as influencing the resultant town structure.

The most complete view of the causeway is gained from the northern inshore public reserve near the beach swimming enclosure. From this location the extent of the causeway can be fully appreciated and the role it played as part of the military post and later Benevolent Asylum becomes more obvious. Additionally, the view clearly reveals layers of development contrasted against the fabric of the causeway. Whilst not significant, these layers mark the continued growth of the Dunwich landing area and broader town structure.

It is no longer possible to view the causeway in its entirety. The southern face of the structure has since been used as a stabilising wall against which further land reclamation has been carried out to improve and increase the barge landing area. The surface of the causeway is now covered by concrete pavement however was originally compacted soil. The eastern end of the causeway disappears into more recent boulder wall constructed as part of the sea shore stabilisation. At the water's end the causeway disappears into a more recent boat ramp constructed of boulders and concrete with a bitumen trafficable surface leading into the water. The wooden jetty constructed as part of the Benevolent Asylum has been replaced by a more recent jetty structure which angles to the southwest away from the causeway end. A number of weathered wooden piles along the northern face of the causeway are all that remain of the protective frame constructed during the Benevolent Asylum period.

The causeway itself is approximately 90 metres (300 ft) long and 7 metres (23 ft) wide and constructed from rough, red coloured stone of regular size, laid in straight courses without mortar. It is believed the stone for the wall was taken from the beach or quarry face on the nearby Doctor's Hill. There are obvious sections of the wall that are deteriorating as well as sections of wall that have been repaired. These areas of repair are most easily identified as infills of irregularly shaped, sandy coloured stone, quarried from a different location on the island. In the areas of deterioration the method of causeway construction and layers of history can be fully appreciated. Through the rubble the layers of rock and causeway infill material are visible as well as segments of the tram tracks, laid as part of the Benevolent Asylum additions to the causeway. This exposure confirms the thought that whilst sections of the wall may be buried they are more than likely intact.

== Heritage listing ==
Dunwich Convict Causeway was listed on the Queensland Heritage Register on 22 October 1999 having satisfied the following criteria.

The place is important in demonstrating the evolution or pattern of Queensland's history.

Constructed as part of a convict outstation and the primary landing place for all vessels coming into Moreton Bay and Brisbane the causeway has historical significance for its valuable role in the early colonial settlement of Queensland. Since the closure of the convict outstation, the causeway has played an important role in subsequent developments at Dunwich.

The place demonstrates rare, uncommon or endangered aspects of Queensland's cultural heritage.

The Dunwich causeway is an extremely important and rare piece of Queensland's built history. With the Windmill and Commissariat Store in Brisbane it is one of three convict structures known to survive in southeast Queensland. More specifically it is perhaps the only example of a convict built maritime structure in the state.

The place has potential to yield information that will contribute to an understanding of Queensland's history.

The causeway provides the community with the potential to yield a greater understanding of Queensland's history and the pivotal role this small structure played in the development of the Moreton Bay penal settlement and in turn the city of Brisbane and state of Queensland.

The place is important in demonstrating the principal characteristics of a particular class of cultural places.

The physical fabric of the causeway clearly illustrates both the principal characteristics of European building techniques in the early part of the nineteenth century and the construction methods used by convicts to build a structure of this nature.

The place is important in demonstrating a high degree of creative or technical achievement at a particular period.

A degree of technical achievement is demonstrated in the construction of the causeway.

The place has a strong or special association with a particular community or cultural group for social, cultural or spiritual reasons.

The causeway has social significance for community groups involved with the Catholic Mission, Quarantine Station, Benevolent Asylum, residents and tourists as the point of landing on North Stradbroke Island.
