= Dunwich Cemetery =

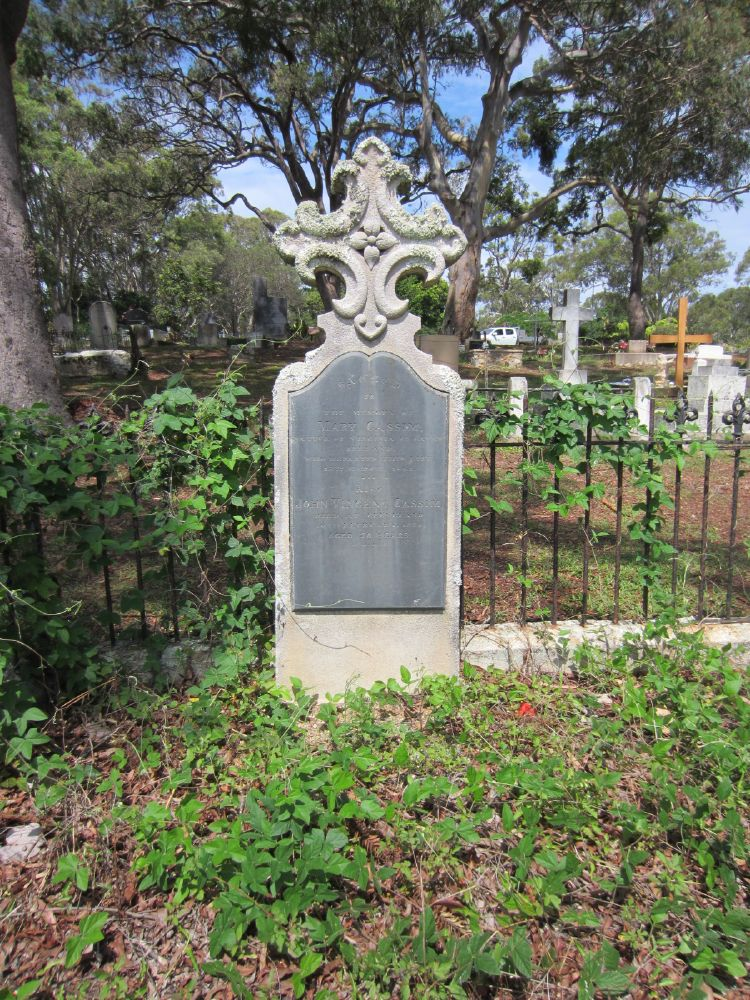
- Dunwich Cemetery, 2015

- Location within Queensland Location within Australia
- 27.4945°S 153.404°E
- Location: Bingle Road, Dunwich, North Stradbroke Island, City of Redland, Queensland, Australia

History
- Design period: 1840s–1860s (mid-19th century)
- Built: 1847–1952

Queensland Heritage Register
- Official name: Dunwich Cemetery, One Mile Cemetery
- Type: state heritage (built, archaeological)
- Designated: 21 October 1992
- Reference no.: 600773
- Significant period: 1847– (social); 1847–1952 (historical, fabric)
- Significant components: sarcophagus, memorial surrounds/railings, memorial – other, trees/plantings, memorial – obelisk, grave marker, cemetery

Dunwich Cemetery is a heritage-listed cemetery at Bingle Road, Dunwich, North Stradbroke Island in the City of Redland, Queensland, Australia. It was built from 1847 to 1952. It is also known as One Mile Cemetery. It was added to the Queensland Heritage Register on 21 October 1992.

== History ==
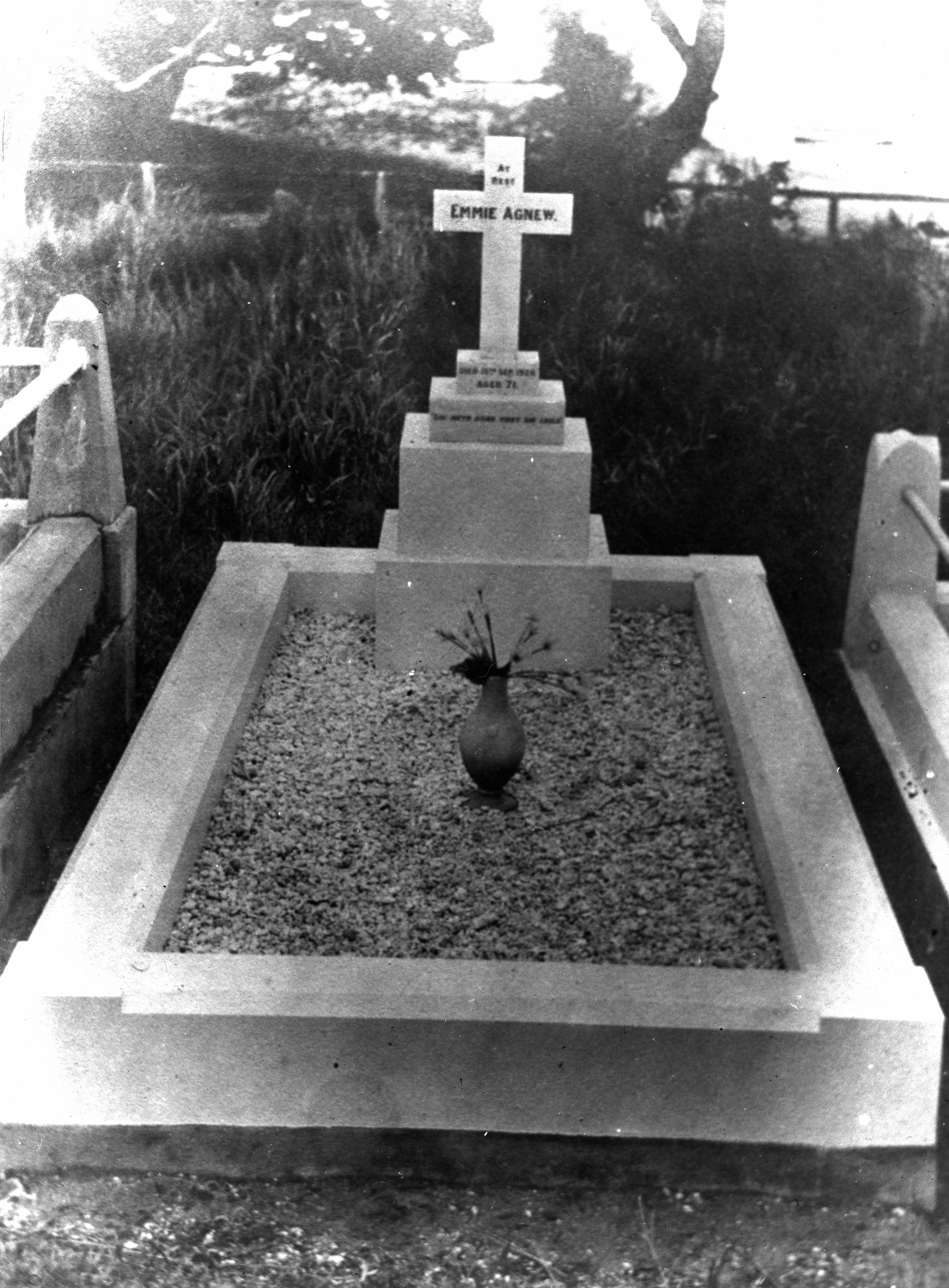
Gravestone of Emmie Agnew in Dunwich Cemetery

The first burials at Dunwich cemetery are believed to date from 1847 and it is one of the earliest surviving cemeteries in Queensland.

The European settlement of Stradbroke Island began in 1827 when a convict out-station was established at Dunwich to serve the Moreton Bay convict settlement based at Brisbane town. During 1827–28 a warehouse and accommodation for convict labourers, boatmen and soldiers were constructed. However, this settlement at Dunwich was short lived as problems with unloading goods in poor weather, smuggling, and hostile Aborigines, resulted in the closure of the out-station in 1831.

Between 1843 and 1847 the first Catholic Mission to Aborigines in the Australian colonies was established at Dunwich, with four Passionist Fathers occupying the former convict buildings. The mission failed, largely due to the poor state of the buildings in which it was accommodated, and the high degree of exposure of the indigenous peoples of Stradbroke Island to Europeans. However, Dunwich continued to be utilised by the government for a variety of institutional purposes for which its isolation rendered it particularly suitable, both for health reasons and in response to social and cultural values of the time.

Quarantine procedures were instituted in Australia in 1841 and in the following year Moreton Bay was thrown open to free settlement. In late 1849, in consideration of the numbers of free settlers who were expected arrive in Moreton Bay, the Colonial Secretary requested the Police Magistrate in Brisbane to suggest a suitable site for a quarantine station. North Stradbroke Island was proposed and in July 1850, Dunwich was gazetted as a quarantine area. At this time, some burials had already taken place at Dunwich, presumably at this site. The first is believed to be that of sailors from the ship Sovereign in 1847.

Within two months of the opening of the quarantine station, the ship Emigrant, with an outbreak of typhus on board, reached Moreton Bay. The ship was ordered into isolation at Dunwich, where a further 26 of its passengers died. They were buried at the cemetery, along with the Queensland Surgeon-General, Dr David Keith Ballow, and the ship's doctor, Dr George Mitchell, both of whom attended the immigrants.

In 1867 the quarantine station was transferred to Peel Island, and the Queensland government officially established the Dunwich Benevolent Asylum in the former quarantine buildings, although Asylum inmates were housed at Dunwich from as early as 1864. The Asylum accommodated the elderly, disabled or infirm who had no other means of support. At the time, institutionalisation was considered to be the appropriate treatment of those who were unable to fulfil a useful role in society. Accommodation on an island close to Brisbane, yet separated from it, effectively removed Asylum inmates from society and made administrative control easier. The isolation of the island also made it a useful place to treat conditions believed to be infectious and a lazaret was established at nearby Adam's Beach in 1892, where it remained until moved to Peel Island in 1907. From 1896 the Dunwich Benevolent Asylum housed inebriates. Consumptive patients were also taken until 1935, but were accommodated in isolation "camp".

In 1946–7 the Dunwich lands were subdivided and the remaining Asylum inmates, mainly aged people, were removed to the Eventide Home at Sandgate, occupying the site of the former RAAF Station Sandgate. All the Dunwich ward buildings were sold, dismantled and either moved to different sites within a newly surveyed Dunwich township, or removed to the mainland for government purposes. In June 1947 the Dunwich Benevolent Asylum was officially closed and the area was redeveloped for residential and other private purposes. In the 80 years spanning 1867–1947, 8,426 former inmates of the Dunwich Benevolent Asylum were buried in the Dunwich Cemetery. Those buried are believed to include many who were descended from the traditional owners of Stradbroke Island.

After cleaning up the grounds in late 1947, control of the cemetery, which was on Crown Land, passed to the Department of Health and Home Affairs, though it was a matter of some dispute as to who should be responsible for its maintenance. It was not an official cemetery reserve and proposals to proclaim it as such were suspended in 1949, as Trustees had to be appointed. The cemetery was officially closed to further burials in 1952. Though a local, Power Irvine Nelson Dickson, acted as an honorary caretaker in the 1950s, the cemetery gradually fell into disrepair as headstones and grave markers suffered from vandalism and theft.

In 1970 the Redland Shire Council agreed to become Trustees for the cemetery, providing that the government carried out the necessary survey. This was completed in 1973 and on 13 April 1974 the area was officially gazetted as a cemetery reserve with the Redland Shire Council as Trustees.

Restoration work was carried out on the cemetery in 1987/88 with the aid of Bicentennial grants and plans were made for a memorial wall. This was constructed of bricks from the former Asylum laundry, which had been demolished, by the sand-mining company Consolidated Rutile Limited, in honour of all the inmates lying in unmarked graves. Nameplates have been attached to it as the names of those buried have been confirmed by research.

A metal sign listing the names of the 26 immigrants buried at Dunwich was unveiled in the cemetery in 1993.

== Description ==
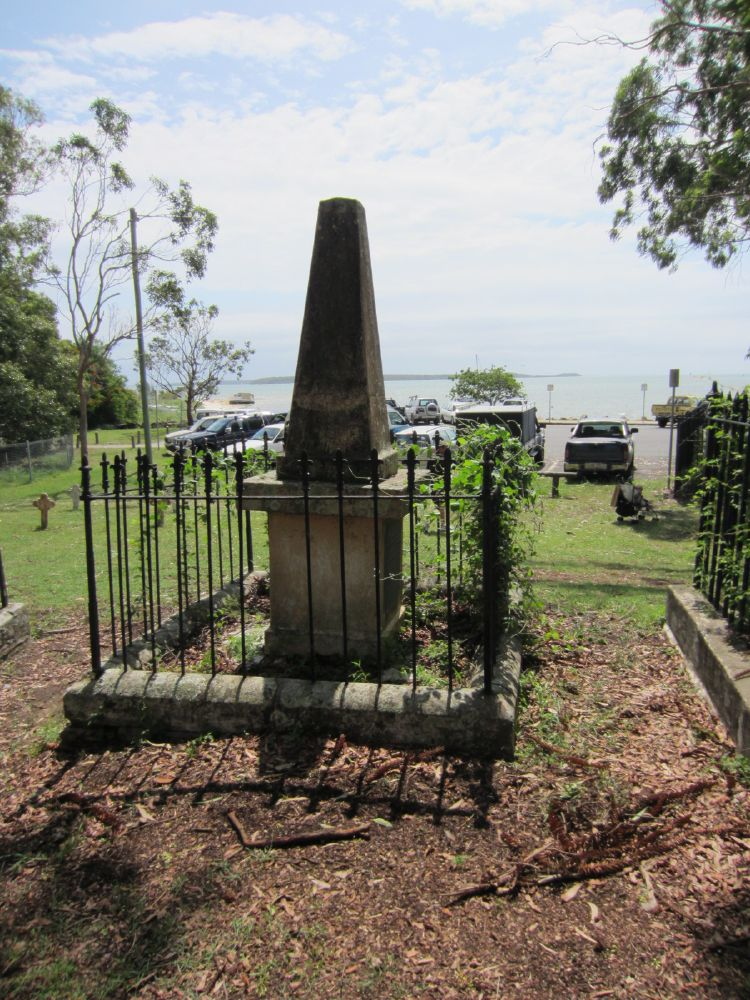
Dunwich Cemetery overlooking Moreton Bay, 2015

Dunwich Cemetery overlooks Moreton Bay and is bounded to the west by a camping area. It is otherwise circled by Flinders Avenue, Bingle Road, East Coast Road and Yabby Street: a section on the north west faces a jetty. The reserve comprises an open grassed area scattered with mature trees and extends over 3.295 hectares (8.14 acres). The cemetery is thought to contain approximately 10,000 burials, largely those of inmates of the Benevolent Asylum, though most of these are unmarked.

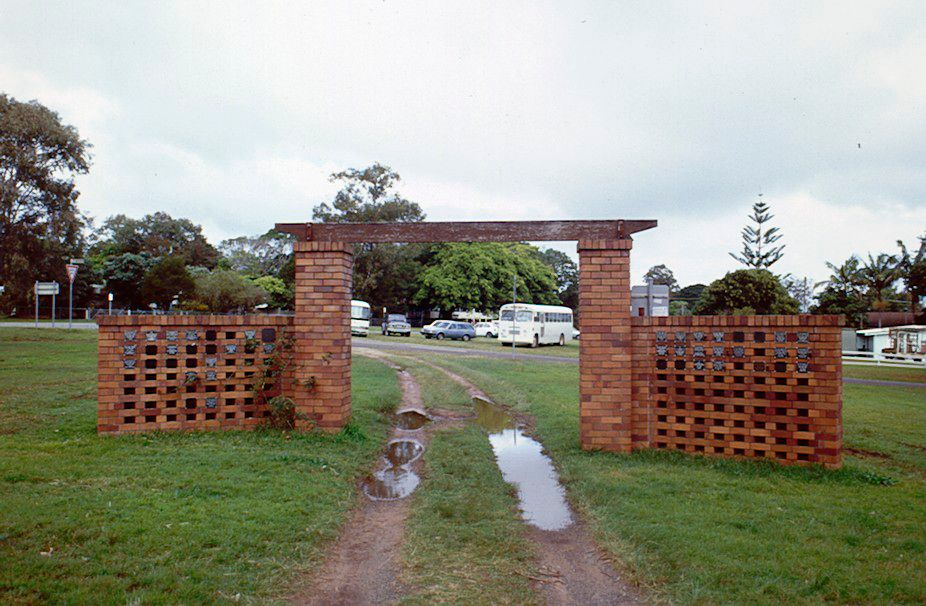
Entrance and columbarium, 1999

The cemetery reserve is entered from Flinders Avenue on the south through a gateway at the centre of a brick columbarium. In the north western corner are a cluster of memorials including those of the 26 passengers from the Emigrant, which are identified only by metal trefoil markers and a modern metal sign bearing all their names. Nearby are the graves of Dr David Ballow and Dr George Mitchell who attended them. The memorial over the Ballow grave is in the form of a sarcophagus and that over the Mitchell burial a stone obelisk; metal railings enclose both. There is also a memorial to Dr Patrick Smith, the first Medical Superintendent of the Benevolent Institution from 1885 to 1900 and sundry other memorials.

Near these memorials is a triangular brick structure, enclosed by a metal railing and bearing nameplates. This is constructed of bricks from the old Asylum laundry and commemorates those lying in unmarked graves.

There is also a cluster of memorials on the north east side of the cemetery and scattered across the reserve.

== Heritage listing ==
Dunwich Cemetery was listed on the Queensland Heritage Register on 21 October 1992 having satisfied the following criteria.

The place is important in demonstrating the evolution or pattern of Queensland's history.

Dunwich Cemetery is one of the earliest surviving cemeteries in Queensland and is associated with the early European settlement of North Stradbroke Island and the Moreton Bay Region. The burials of passengers from the 1850 typhus epidemic aboard the Emigrant and those of the doctors who treated them are evidence for the early use of North Stradbroke Island as a quarantine station. The large number of burials of inmates of the Benevolent Asylum between 1867 and 1946 link the cemetery to this important phase in the history of the Island. They are evidence for 19th and early 20th century government policies and community values regarding health and social welfare that determined the isolation of the poor, elderly, infirm and diseased from the mainstream of society.

The place has a strong or special association with a particular community or cultural group for social, cultural or spiritual reasons.

The reserve has a long association with the community of Stradbroke Island and has particular significance to the descendants of those buried in the cemetery.

== Notable burials ==
- Alexandre Arsène Girault, entomologist
