= Kurilpa =

Kurilpa may refer to

- Electoral district of Kurilpa, a former electoral district in Queensland, Australia
- West End, Queensland, a locality known to its indigenous inhabitants as "Kurilpa"
- The Fawn-footed mosaic-tailed rat, a native Australian rodent

== See also ==
- Kurilpa Bridge
- Kurilpa Library
