= David Keith Ballow =

Australian Government Medical Officer (1804–1850)

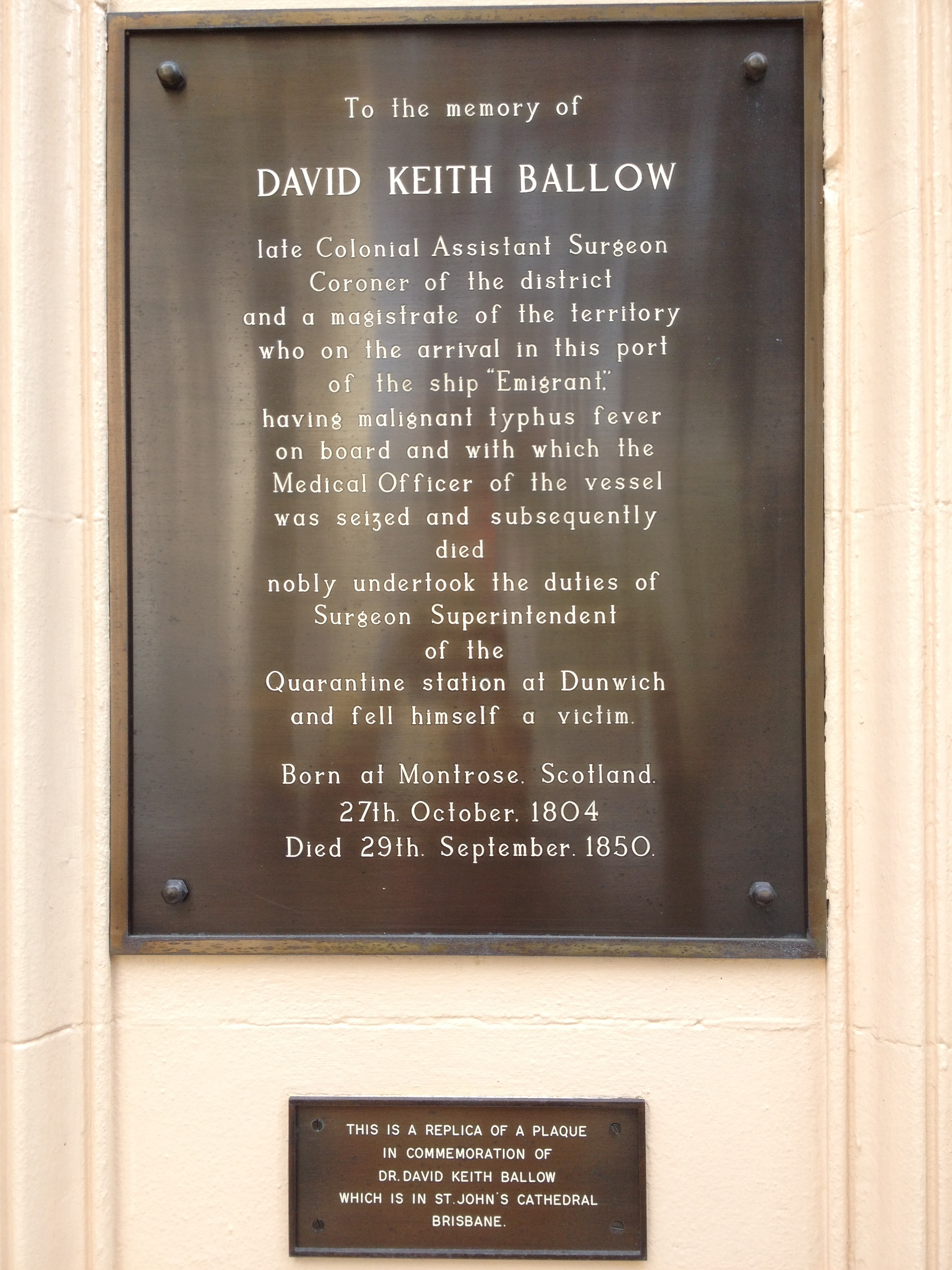
Plaque on Ballow Chambers, Wickham Terrace, Brisbane, 2013

David Keith Ballow (October 1804 – 29 September 1850) was the government medical officer in Brisbane, Queensland, Australia and the first doctor to establish a private practice in Brisbane.

== Early life ==
David Keith Ballow was born in October 1804 at Montrose, Scotland, the eldest son of John Ballow. He studied at the University of Edinburgh.

== Medical career in Sydney ==
He immigrated to Sydney in 1834. On 21 October 1837, in Sydney, he married Catherine Campbell, the youngest daughter of Captain D. McArthur, of the 2nd Royal Veteran Battalion. In December 1837, Dr Ballow was appointed Assistant Colonial Surgeon in Sydney.

== Medical career in Brisbane ==
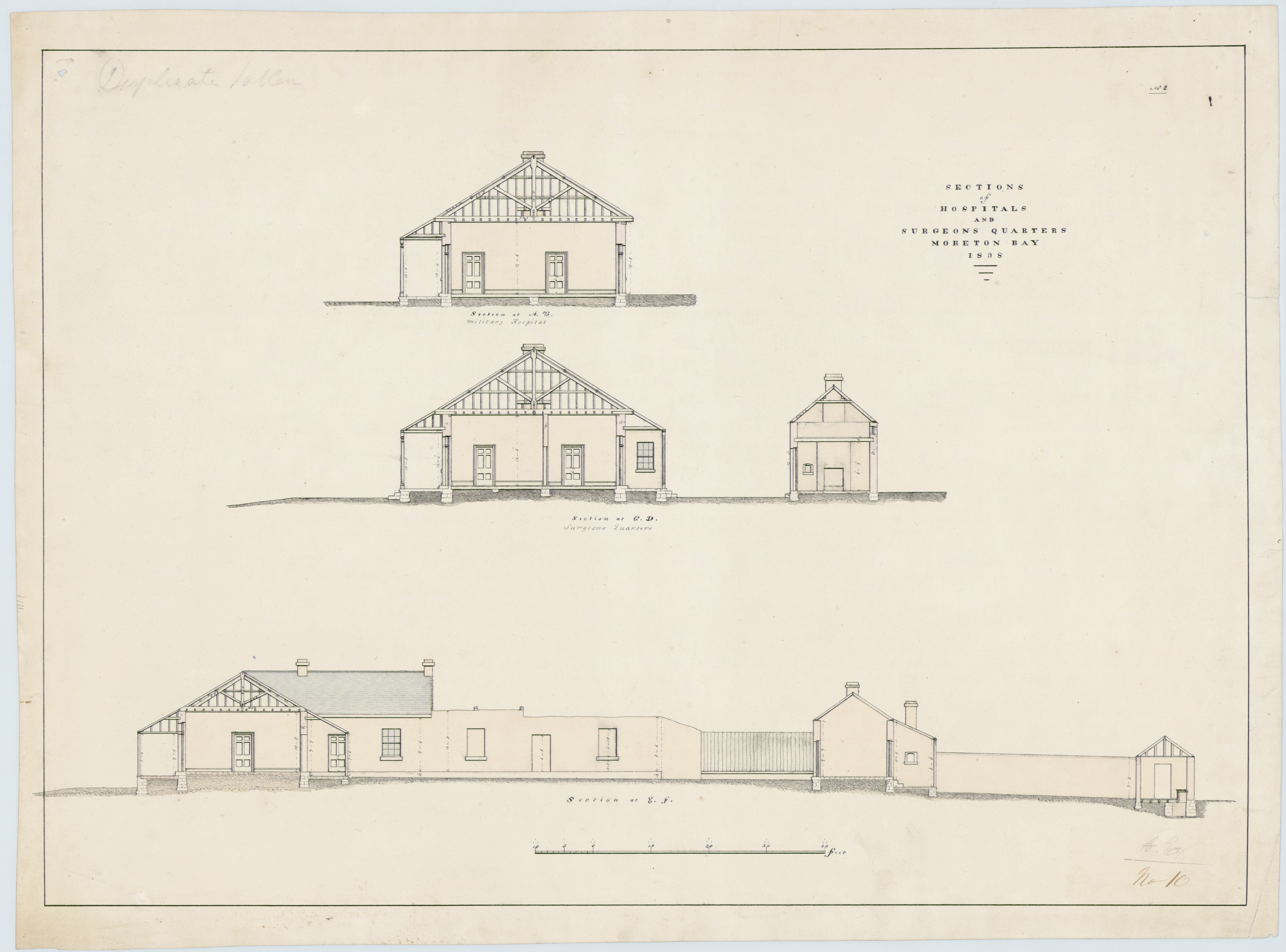
Drawings of the hospital and Ballow's quarters, 1838

In March 1838, he was placed in charge of the Government Hospital in Brisbane. Ballow and his wife arrived in Brisbane as it transitioned from being a penal colony to a free settlement. He later become the Resident Surgeon of the Moreton Bay General Hospital. He was also the coroner for the Brisbane district and the visiting surgeon of the jail.

On 8 August 1850, the immigrant ship Emigrant arrived in Moreton Bay with typhus on board. The ship was quarantined at Dunwich on Stradbroke Island away from Brisbane. Forty people on the ship died, including the ship's surgeon Dr George Mitchell. Initially Dr Mallon came from Brisbane to care for the quarantined patients at Dunwich but he too contracted the infection. Dr Ballow took his place and also contracted the disease. Dr Kearsey Cannan took charge after Dr Ballow's death. He put his tent on Bird Island, visiting his patients as required from there and managed to avoid catching the disease.

While Dr Mallon recovered, Dr Ballow died at Dunwich on 29 September 1850.

== Memorials ==
Dr Ballow was buried in the Dunwich Cemetery; the cemetery has a memorial stone for Dr Ballow and the other victims of typhus. Ballow Road at Dunwich is believed to be named after him. A white marble memorial tablet was also placed in St John's Cathedral in Brisbane. The heritage-listed Ballow Chambers building of medical suites is named after him and the building has a plaque about Dr Ballow.
