= Cleveland District State High School =

Public school in Cleveland, Queensland, Australia

Location
- Russell Street; Cleveland, Queensland; Australia; 27.53°S 153.261°E

Information
- Type: Public, secondary
- Motto: Semper Digne (Always Worthy)
- Established: 1956
- Principal: Leonard McKeown
- Grades: 7–12
- Enrolment: 2254 (2024)
- Colours: Maroon, gold and white

Cleveland District State High School is an independent coeducational public secondary school based in Cleveland in the local government area of Redland City in Queensland, Australia. As of August 2023, the school had a total enrolment of 2,254 students.

Cleveland District State High School's current role of Executive Principal is held by Leonard McKeown. The school also consists of five Deputy Principals, nine Heads of Department and five Deans of Students.

== History ==
In January 1956, Cleveland District State High School began operating on the grounds of Cleveland State School as the first secondary school in the Redland City area. The school had a population of 32 students and was led by Head Teacher Ted Liesegang. By 1960, the school had reached a total population of 54 students, followed by 84 in the following year. In order to meet the growing demands of the school, new school facilities were constructed on land on Russell Street in the early 1960s. The school was officially opened by the State Treasurer, Sir Thomas Hiley, KBE on 27 April 1963.

The 2010s decade saw a substantial increase in enrolments at the school, with an official count of 2040 students in 2018 compared with 1205 students in 2010. In 2018, Cleveland District State High School became the first school in the Redland City area with a total enrolment of more than 2000 students.

== Sporting houses ==
Cleveland State High School includes the following four sporting houses, all of which are named in reference to islands in Moreton Bay, and their respective colours:

House name	Colour(s)
Macleay	Gold
Moreton	Red
Peel	Green
Russell	Blue

== Excellence programs ==
Excellence programs at Cleveland District State High School include:

- Athlete Support Program
- Creative Arts Centre for Excellence
- Languages
- Music Extension Program
- Sports Development Program

=== AFL Team Achievements ===
==== Junior Female (Years 7-9) ====
- AFL Queensland Schools Cup

(silver) Runners-Up: 2018

== Notable alumni ==
- Ben Ely, from the band Regurgitator
- Emily Gielnik, association football player
- Patience Hodgson, lead singer from The Grates
- Norton Kelly-Boxall, Co-Founder at LYRO Robotics
- Luke Hanson, from the band Full Flower Moon
- Toby Maidment and Andrew Elliott, from the band Vidicolour
- Brendan Sheehy, from the band Flooded Nation
