= William Balfour (lieutenant-colonel) =

William Balfour (1785–1838), was a lieutenant-colonel in the British Army.

Balfour was a boy-ensign in the 40th Foot at the Anglo-Russian invasion of Holland, and won the approval of Sir John Moore. He served on the staff of Major General Brent Spencer in the Mediterranean and at the capture of Copenhagen, and received a brevet lieutenant colonelcy for service in the field with the 40th in the Peninsula and south of France in 1813–14. After a few years on half-pay, he became lieutenant colonel of his old regiment, commanding it for several years in New South Wales, and he was afterwards in command of the 82nd Foot in Mauritius. He retired from the army in 1832, and died in February 1838.
