= Henry Miller (British Army officer) =

British Army officer (1785–1866)

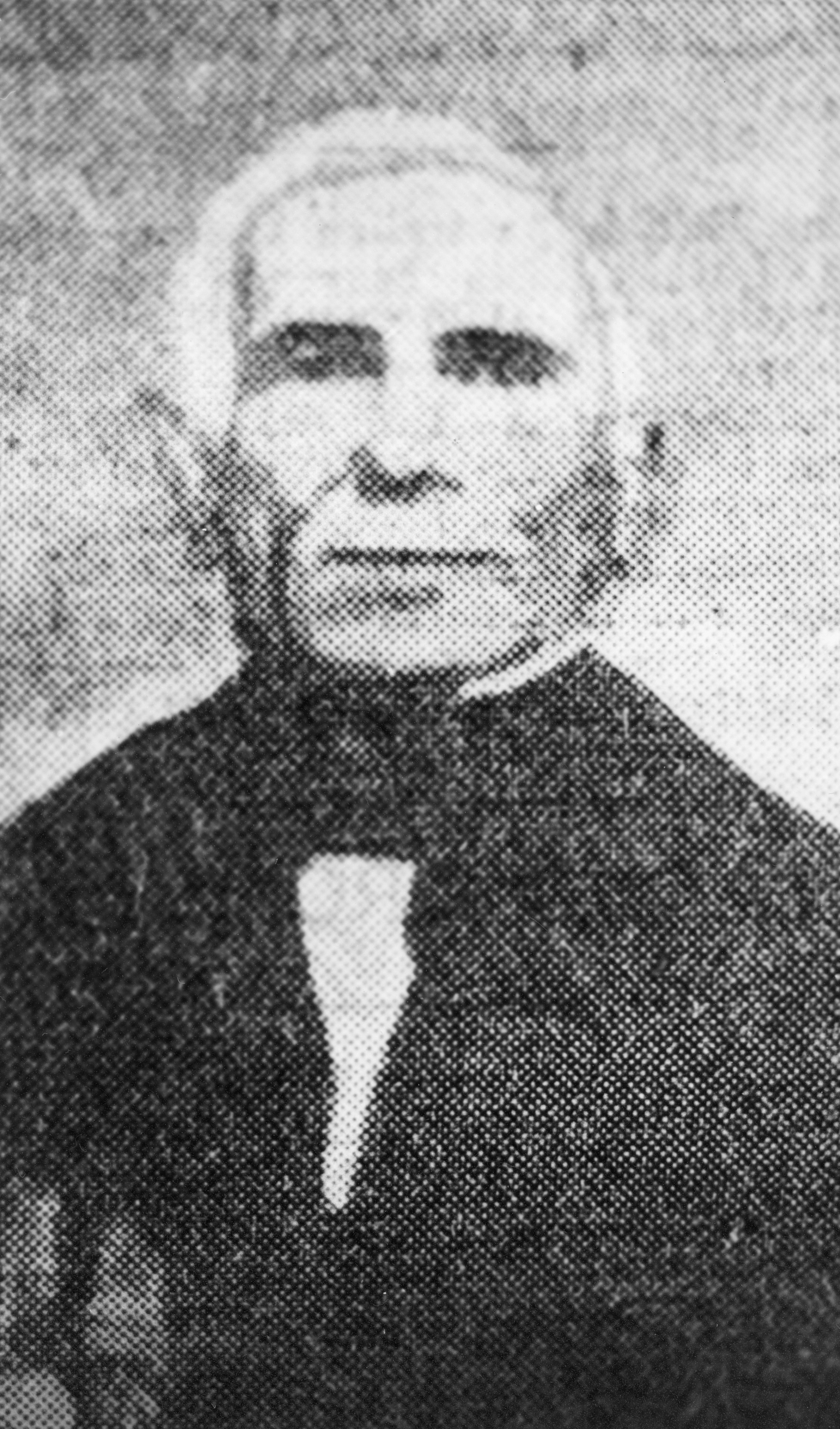
Captain Henry Miller

Henry Miller (1785–1866) was the first commandant of the Moreton Bay penal colony in Queensland, Australia.

== Early life ==
Henry Miller was born in 1785 in Derry, Ireland, the son of a clergyman. Henry Miller entered the army at an early age, being gazetted as an ensign in the 40th Regiment of Foot in 1799, when only 14. He married some ten years later, and his eldest son, Henry Miller, was born on 30 December 1809 in Derry.

His brother, Joseph Miller, was Mayor of Derry on five occasions. His nephew, Sir William Miller, was also mayor.

== War service ==
Miller was in the 40th Regiment which served under the Duke of Wellington on the Peninsula. When Wellington commenced his campaign of 1812 by taking Ciudad Rodrigo, Miller took part in the assault, in which 90 officers and 1200 men were killed.

Miller then crossed the Atlantic Ocean with the 40th. He was at the unsuccessful attack on New Orleans on 8 January 1815 when the commanding officer, Sir Edward Pakenham, was killed.

Miller was back again in Europe in time to be present at the Battle of Waterloo which was his final war service. He was given the Peninsular medal, with clasps for Busaco, Badajos, and Ciudad Rodrigo, and the Waterloo Medal.

After Waterloo the 40th regiment formed part of the army of occupation, and Lieutenant Miller was joined by his wife and family in Paris.

== Moreton Bay penal colony ==
The Battle of Waterloo sealed the fate of Napoleon. As a result, Great Britain was able devote more attention to its growing colonial empire. In March 1823 the regiment was ordered to go to New South Wales. Lieutenant Miller and his family came out with one of the detachments.

Sir Thomas Brisbane had decided that only married officers with families were to be sent as commandants of the out-settlements, and he formally appointed Lieutenant Henry Miller to establish the Moreton Bay penal colony on 12 September 1824. However, by that date Lieutenant Miller was already in charge at Moreton Bay, having arrived there from Sydney in the brig Amity a couple of months earlier.

The Moreton Bay penal colony was initially very primitive. There were no buildings, except huts. The only link to civilisation was the occasional arrival of a ship from Sydney into Moreton Bay (for no ship in that time had ever entered the Brisbane River). It was in these surroundings that Miller's wife gave birth to their second son, who was afterwards christened Charles Moreton Miller, the first male European child born at Moreton Bay and the first male Queenslander.

Henry Miller was at Moreton Bay for about 18 months. He was then succeeded by Captain Peter Bishop, also of the 40th.

== Van Diemen's Land ==
Henry Miller returned to Sydney. From there he went to Van Diemen's Land. In 1828, the regiment went to India, but Captain Miller remained in Hobart in an appointment with the commissariat. He lived at Hobart in a house facing the Glebe.

His oldest son, Henry, who was 15 years old when his father was at Moreton Bay, entered the Audit Office in Hobart, but left to go to the new settlement at Port Phillip where he would become a prominent citizen of the city of Melbourne.

== Later life ==
On 30 December 1840 his wife died at Hobart, aged 53, and on 23 August 1842 Captain Miller married again to Miss McQueen, of New Norfolk.

Henry Miller died at Hobart on 10 January 1866. The second wife died in 1891 and is buried at Hobart with her son, Ernest George Miller, who died in 1887, aged 37 years. Captain Miller's grave at Hobart in course of time fell into disrepair.
