= Richard Chetwynd, 5th Viscount Chetwynd =

British aristocrat (1757 – 1821)

The Right Honourable The Viscount Chetwynd of Bearhaven
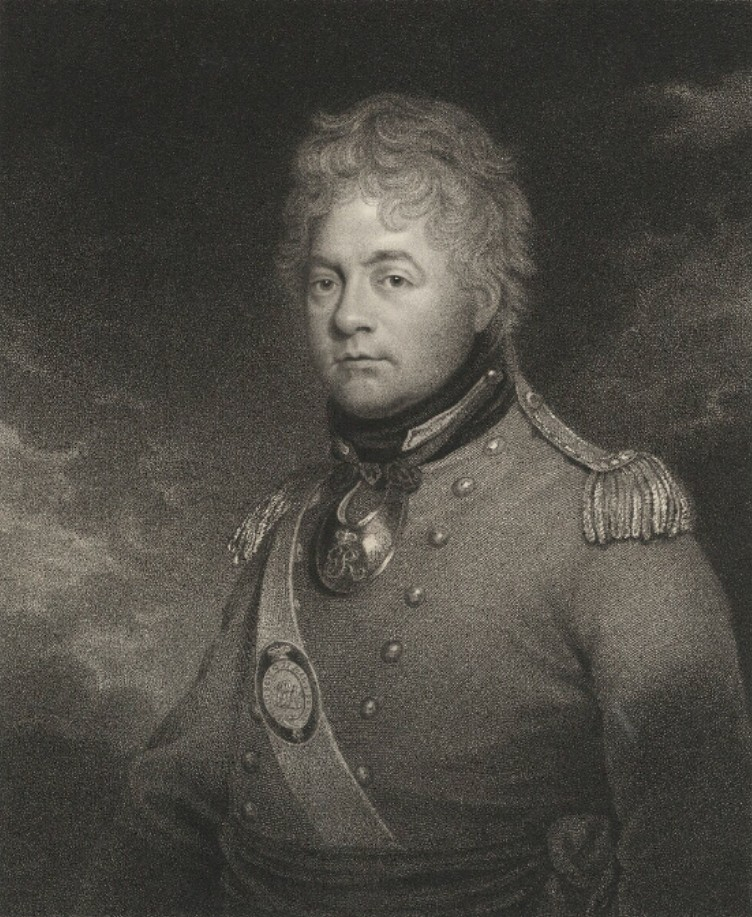

Personal details
- Born: Richard Chetwynd; 29 September 1757 Little Haywood, Staffordshire
- Died: 27 February 1821 (aged 63) Piccadilly, London
- Spouse: Charlotte Cartwright (m. 1791; died 1821)
- Relations: William Chetwynd, 3rd Viscount Chetwynd (grandfather); Henry Goulburn (nephew); Frederick Goulburn (nephew); Granville William Chetwynd Stapylton (nephew)
- Children: 3
- Parent(s): William Chetwynd, 4th Viscount Chetwynd; Susannah Cope

Richard Chetwynd, 5th Viscount Chetwynd of Bearhaven (29 September 1757 – 27 February 1821) was a British aristocrat.

== Early life ==
William was born on 29 September 1757 at Haywood Park, Little Haywood, Staffordshire. He was the fourth son of William Chetwynd, 4th Viscount Chetwynd and Susannah Cope. His sister, Hon. Anderlechtia Clarissa Chetwynd, married Lord Robert Seymour (son of Francis Seymour-Conway, 1st Marquess of Hertford and Lady Isabella Fitzroy).

His paternal grandparents were William Chetwynd, 3rd Viscount Chetwynd and the former Honora Baker (the daughter of William Baker, Consul at Algiers). Through his sister Susannah, he was uncle to Henry Goulburn, Chancellor of the Exchequer, and Frederick Goulburn, Colonial Secretary of New South Wales, among others. Through his brother Granville, he was uncle to Granville William Chetwynd Stapylton, a pioneer explorer and surveyor in Australia. His aunt Mary Chetwynd married Rev. Hon. Richard Henry Roper (son of the 8th Baron Teynham). His maternal grandparents were Sir Jonathan Cope, 1st Baronet, MP, and Mary Jenkinson (the third daughter of Sir Robert Jenkinson).

== Career ==
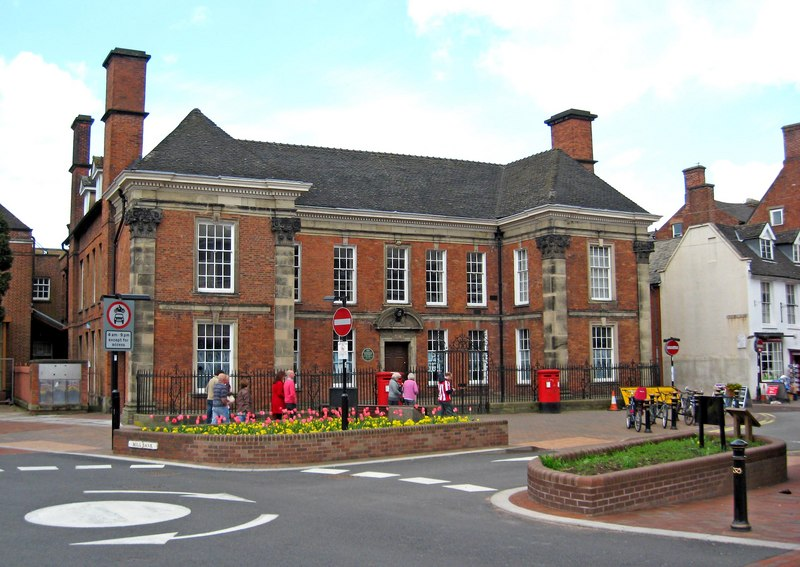
Chetwynd House

As his elder brothers William, Jonathan and John all died unmarried, upon his father's death on 12 November 1791 he succeeded as the 5th Viscount Chetwynd of Bearhaven as well as the 5th Baron Rathdowne,

Chetwynd was Clerk to the Privy Council between 1772 and 1821. He served as Lieutenant-Colonel in the York Fencible Infantry Regiment.

== Personal life ==
On 30 July 1791, he married Charlotte Cartwright (1772–1845), daughter of Thomas Cartwright and Mary Catherine Desaguliers (eldest daughter of Gen. Thomas Desaguliers). Together, they were the parents of:

- Richard Walter Chetwynd, 6th Viscount Chetwynd (1800–1879), who married Mary Moss, daughter of Robert Moss and Sophia Weyland, in 1822. After her death, he married Mary Hussey, daughter of John Hussey, in 1861.
- Hon. Esther Chetwynd (d. 1829), who married, as his second wife, her first cousin, Edward Goulburn, son of Munbee Goulburn and Hon. Susannah Chetwynd, in 1825.
- Hon. Mary Anne Chetwynd (1803–1889), who died unmarried.

Lady Chetwynd died on 27 February 1821 at Bolton Row, Piccadilly, London and was succeeded in his titles by his eldest son, Richard. He died intestate, however, and his estate was administered in April 1821.

=== Descendants ===
Through his son Richard, he was a grandfather of Richard Chetwynd, 7th Viscount Chetwynd and Capt. Henry Weyland Chetwynd (father of Godfrey Chetwynd, 8th Viscount Chetwynd), among others.

Peerage of Ireland
Preceded by William Chetwynd	Viscount Chetwynd; 1791–1821	Succeeded by Richard Walter Chetwynd
