= William Chetwynd, 4th Viscount Chetwynd =

British politician (1721–1791)

The Right Honourable The Viscount Chetwynd of Bearhaven

Member of Parliament for Stockbridge
- In office 1747–1754 Serving with Daniel Boone
- Preceded by: Sir Humphrey Monoux; Charles Churchill
- Succeeded by: John Gibbons; George Hay

Personal details
- Born: William Chetwynd; 25 November 1721 London, England
- Died: 12 November 1791 (aged 69) Donnybrook Green
- Party: Whig
- Spouse: Susannah Cope (after 1751)
- Relations: Henry Goulburn (grandson); Frederick Goulburn; Granville William Chetwynd Stapylton (grandson)
- Parent(s): William Chetwynd, 3rd Viscount Chetwynd; Honora Baker
- Education: Hertford College, Oxford

William Chetwynd, 4th Viscount Chetwynd of Bearhaven (25 November 1721 – 12 November 1791) was a British Whig politician who sat in the House of Commons from 1747 to 1754.

== Early life ==
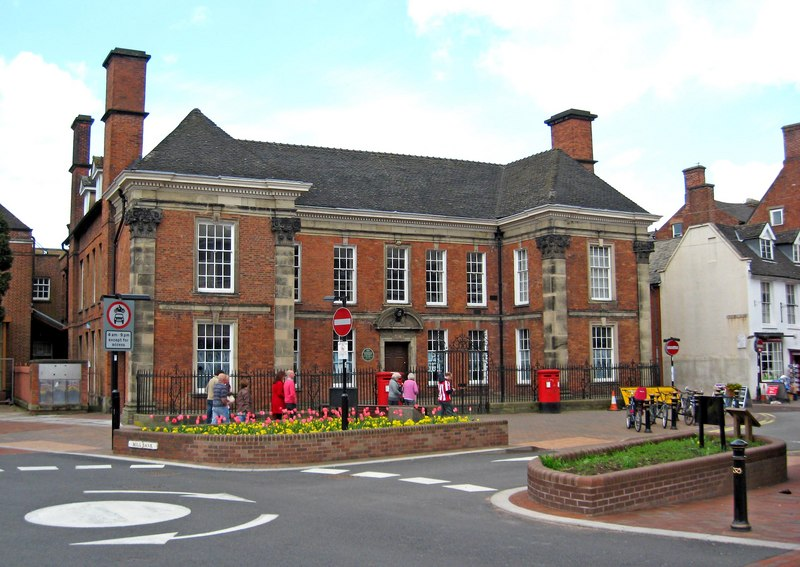
Chetwynd House

Chetwynd was born on 25 November 1721 and was baptised on 21 December 1721 at St Martin-in-the-Fields in London. He was the eldest of two sons and four daughters of William Chetwynd, 3rd Viscount Chetwynd and the former Honora Baker. His father was an MP and diplomat who served as British Resident Minister at Genoa and, later, Master of the Mint. His mother was the daughter of William Baker, Consul at Algiers in 1715.

His father was the youngest son of John Chetwynd and, thus, a younger brother of Walter Chetwynd, 1st Viscount Chetwynd and John Chetwynd, 2nd Viscount Chetwynd from whom he inherited the viscountcy.

He matriculated at Hertford College, Oxford on 2 December 1737.

== Career ==
He held the office of Whig Member of Parliament for Stockbridge between 1747 and 1754. He held the office of Equerry to the King between 1758 and 1760.

Upon his father's death on 3 April 1770, he succeeded as the 4th Viscount Chetwynd of Bearhaven as well as the 4th Baron Rathdowne, even though he had been disinherited by his father. His sister Mary Chetwynd married Rev. Hon. Richard Henry Roper (son of the 8th Baron Teynham).

== Personal life ==
On 28 October 1751, he married Susannah Cope, daughter of Sir Jonathan Cope, 1st Baronet, MP, and Mary Jenkinson (the third daughter of Sir Robert Jenkinson). Together, they were the parents of:

- Hon. Susannah Chetwynd (d. 1818), who married wealthy planter, Munbee Goulburn, of Amity Hall, Vere Parish, Jamaica, in 1782.
- Hon. William Chetwynd (1753–1779), a captain in the 46th Foot who died unmarried.
- Jonathan Chetwynd (b. c. 1756), who died in infancy.
- Hon. John Whitmore Chetwynd (1754–1788), a captain in the Royal Navy of HMS Expedition who died unmarried in Jamaica.
- Richard Chetwynd, 5th Viscount Chetwynd (1757–1821), who married Charlotte Cartwright, daughter of Thomas Cartwright and Mary Catherine Desaguliers (eldest daughter of Gen. Thomas Desaguliers), in 1791.
- Maj.-Gen. Granville Anson Chetwynd-Stapylton (1758–1834), the Paymaster and Inspector General of Marines who married Martha Stapylton, daughter of Henry Stapylton and Harriot Warton, in 1783.
- Hon. Anderlechtia Clarissa Chetwynd (1765–1855), who married, as his second wife, Lord Robert Seymour, son of Francis Seymour-Conway, 1st Marquess of Hertford and Lady Isabella Fitzroy (a daughter of Charles FitzRoy, 2nd Duke of Grafton, and thus descended in the illegitimate line from King Charles II), in 1806.

Lady Chetwynd died on 3 March 1790. Lord Chetwynd died at Donnybrook Green on 12 November 1791. He was buried at Christ Church, Dublin.

=== Descendants ===
Through his daughter Susannah, he was a grandfather of Henry Goulburn, Chancellor of the Exchequer, and Frederick Goulburn, Colonial Secretary of New South Wales, among others.

Through his son Granville, he was a grandfather of Granville William Chetwynd Stapylton, a pioneer explorer and surveyor in Australia.

Parliament of Great Britain
Preceded by Sir Humphrey Monoux; Charles Churchill	Member of Parliament for Stockbridge; 1747–1754; With: Daniel Boone	Succeeded by John Gibbons; George Hay
Peerage of Ireland
Preceded by William Chetwynd	Viscount Chetwynd; 1770–1791	Succeeded by Richard Chetwynd
