= The Old Windmill, Brisbane =

The Old Windmill
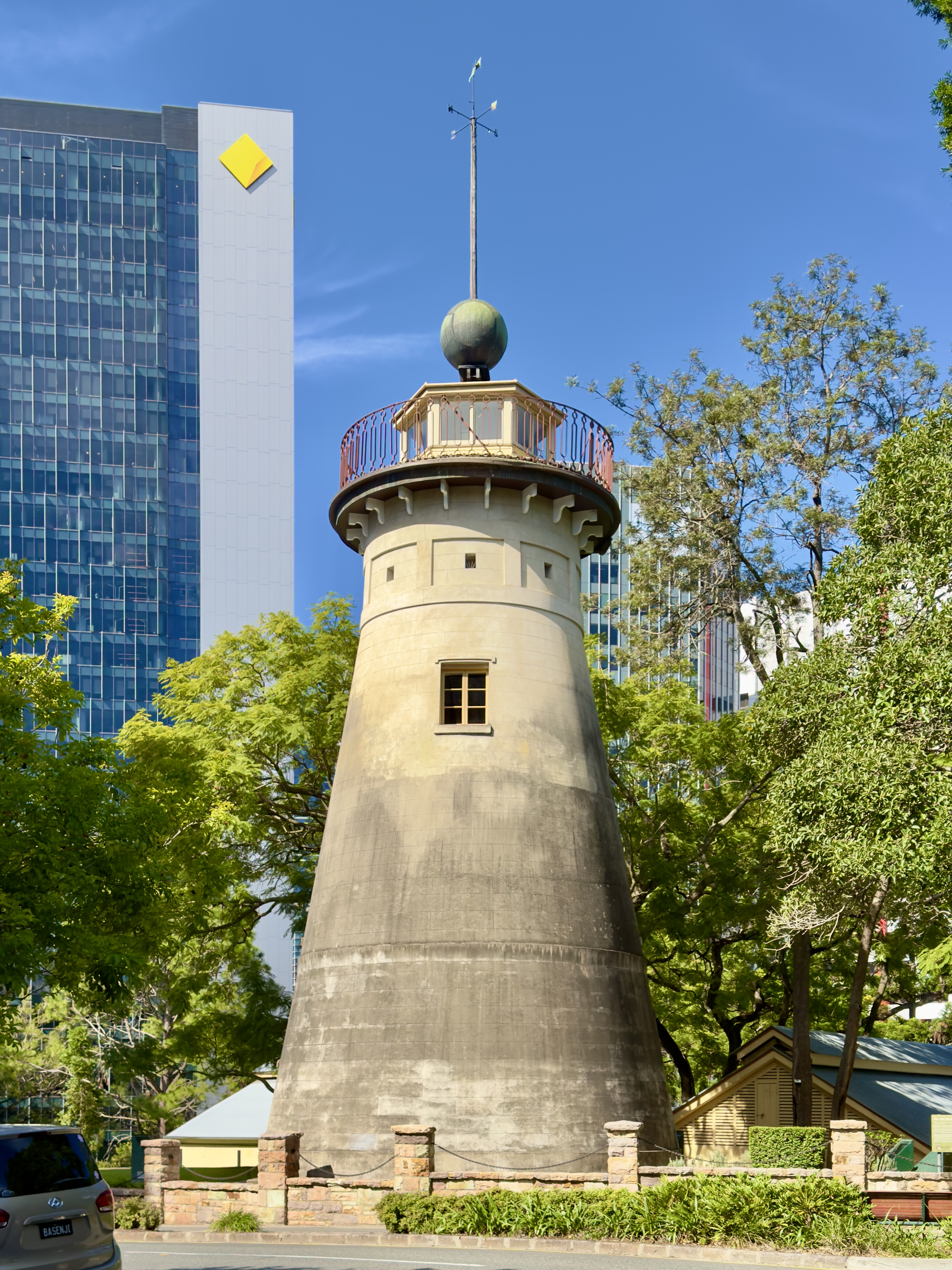
- The Old Windmill, Observatory Park
- Interactive map of The Old Windmill

Origin
- Mill name: The Old Windmill
- Mill location: Spring Hill, Queensland
- Coordinates: 27.465256°S 153.022867°E
- Year built: 1828

Information
- Purpose: Corn mill
- Type: Tower mill
- Storeys: Four storey tower
- No. of sails: Four sails
- Auxiliary power: Treadwheel
- No. of pairs of millstones: Two pairs

The Old Windmill, Brisbane
- Location within Queensland
- 27.4657°S 153.0231°E
- Location: 226 Wickham Terrace, Spring Hill, City of Brisbane, Queensland, Australia

History
- Design period: 1824–1841 (convict settlement)
- Built: 1820s

Queensland Heritage Register
- Official name: Windmill Tower, Brisbane Observatory, Old Windmill
- Type: state heritage (archaeological, built)
- Designated: 21 October 1992
- Reference no.: 600173
- Significant period: 1820s, 1860s, 1894 (fabric) c. 1828–1842, 1861–1890s, 1922–1926, 1930s, 1940s (historical)
- Significant components: amphitheatre, time ball
- Builders: Convict labour

The Old Windmill is a heritage-listed tower mill in Observatory Park adjacent to Wickham Park at 226 Wickham Terrace, Spring Hill, City of Brisbane, Queensland, Australia. It was built in the 1820s by convict labour in the Moreton Bay penal settlement and is the oldest surviving building in Queensland. It is also known as Brisbane Observatory and Windmill Tower. It was added to the Queensland Heritage Register on 21 October 1992. Today it is the centrepiece of Observatory Park and a lookout over parts of the Brisbane CBD.

== History ==
The oldest convict-built structure surviving in Queensland, the windmill tower has accommodated a range of uses. Constructed in 1828 to process the wheat and corn crops of the Moreton Bay penal settlement, it had a treadmill attached for times when there was no wind but also as a tool for punishing convicts. The mill ceased grinding grain in 1845 and the treadmill was removed sometime before 1849. From 1855 the tower was reused as a signal station to communicate shipping news between the entrance of the Brisbane River and the town. Substantial renovations were made to it in 1861 including the installation of a time ball to assist in regulating clocks and watches. Twenty years later a cottage for the signalman was constructed to the immediate west of the tower, with a detached kitchen erected to the south two years after that. Both were later demolished. The windmill tower was used as a facility for early radio, telephony and television communications research from the 1920s and underwent substantial conservation work in the 1980s and 2009.

=== Grain grinding ===
In May 1825, after eight months of occupation at Redcliffe, the contingent of convicts, soldiers, administrators and their families comprising the Moreton Bay penal settlement relocated to the site of present-day Brisbane's central business district. The growing settlement was to be self-sufficient in feeding its residents by cultivating corn (also known as maize) and wheat crops at the government farm, which were then processed into meal and flour by hand mills. By 1827, with a substantial crop to process, the settlement storekeeper recommended a treadmill be erected to grind the crop into flour. Commandant Patrick Logan indicated at this time that such a device at Brisbane town would be of service and also provide an avenue for the punishment of convicts.

There is little evidence confirming details of the windmill tower's planning and construction. In July 1828, Peter Beauclerk Spicer, the Superintendent of Convicts at the time, recorded in his diary that convicts were "clearing ground for foundations for the Mill" and proceeded to dig a circular trench that reached bedrock and had a circumference of approximately 9 metres (30 ft). Allan Cunningham noted soon after that construction was in progress. The mill was constructed on the highest point overlooking the settlement on what is now Wickham Terrace. By 31 October 1828 the first grain was being ground at the site by a mill gang; however it is supposed that this was done by a treadmill as the rotating cap and sails associated with the wind-powered operation of the mill were not brought to the site until November. Circumstantial evidence suggests that the wind-powered grinding of grain did not begin until December.

There were two pairs of millstones inside the tower, each driven independently by the treadmill and sail mechanisms. The former was located outside the tower, a shaft connecting the treadwheel and the mill cogwheels inside. Two sketches from the early 1830s show the windmill tower and its sail stocks in place, while an 1839 description depicts a tower built from stone and brick, comprising four floors, a treadmill and windmill. From 1829 the windmill tower was said to be continually requiring repair, possibly because its equipment was all made from locally available timber rather than iron.

The treadmill was an important component of the mill, for use as punishment without trial, and for times when there was no wind but the amounts of grain sufficient to sustain the settlement still required processing. No plans exist of the Brisbane treadmill; however, the Office of the Colonial Architect produced a standard Design for Tread Mill Adapted for Country Districts Average Estimate £120. Between 25 and 30 men worked at the mill at any one time. Sixteen operated the treadmill, although as there are no plans, it is uncertain whether it comprised a standard 16-place treadmill, or two 8-place sections connected to a common shaft. Each man would climb five steps to get onto the wheel, standing on the 9-inch-wide (23 cm) treads and holding on to the rail. The men would then work as though ascending steps to operate the treadmill. Some undertook this task while in leg irons, while the more able used one hand to hold on and the other to draw sketches of people, animals and scenes on the boards of the mill. The men would work from sunrise to sunset with three hours rest in the middle of the day in summer, and two hours in winter. The first casualty of the treadmill, which produced the first official record of its existence, occurred in September 1829 when prisoner Michael Collins lost his life after being entangled in the operating mechanism. Maps of 1840s Brisbane feature a rectangular structure attached to the outside of the tower, Robert Dixon's in particular showing a 6 by 5 metres (20 ft × 16 ft) structure, probably the treadmill, located on ground that was to become Wickham Terrace.

In February 1836 the windmill tower was struck by lightning, causing severe damage throughout, including to the treadmill. A convict millwright was brought from Sydney in June for the repairs, which amounted to a major rebuild of the structure that was not completed until May 1837. In April 1839, with the closure of the Moreton Bay penal settlement being planned, the windmill tower was one of the buildings recommended for transfer to the colony. This was approved in 1840–41 but it continued to sporadically process grain until 1845, when due to crop failure, a stagnant population and the availability of imported flour, it finally ceased being used. The penal settlement had officially closed in February 1842. The treadmill operated until 1845 and had been removed by October 1849.

The windmill tower in Brisbane is the oldest of its type left standing in Australia and further distinguished by having been built by convict labour. The earliest standing stone windmill towers extant around the country date from the 1830s and include: one built in 1837 in South Perth, Western Australia; another built in the same year at Oatlands in Tasmania which operated until 1890; and another built at Mount Gilead near Campbelltown in New South Wales in 1836. Most were built to process grains into flour. Other surviving mill towers are the one built in 1842 by FR Nixon at Mount Barker in South Australia; Chapman's mill built around 1850 at Wonnerup in Western Australia, and another built at a similar time on an island in the Murray River near South Yunderup in Western Australia. None of the nineteen windmill towers that characterised the early settlement at Sydney have survived. Technological developments, most particularly steam power which was more dependable than wind power or that generated by convict labour at a treadmill, rendered wind-driven mills largely redundant.

=== Surveying ===
Indicative of the prominence of its physical position, the tower served as one of the stations for the trigonometrical survey of the Moreton Bay district conducted by Robert Dixon, Granville Stapylton and James Warner from May 1839 in preparation for the area being opened to free settlement. Land leases in the wider Brisbane area were issued under s.28 of the Regulations of 29 March 1848 and were nominally one mile square sections within a grid defined by (magnetic) north/south/east–west section lines. The grid had its origin at the convict-built windmill in Brisbane.

=== Executions ===
On 3 July 1841 the windmill was the site of the first legal executions in Brisbane. The local Foreman of Public Works, Andrew Petrie, converted the disused structure into a gallows by running a beam out of the upper window to which was attached the nooses. The condemned were two Aboriginal men named Mullan (also known as Merridio) and Nungavil (also known as Neugavil), who had been convicted in Sydney of being accessories to the murder of Assistant Surveyor Granville Stapylton and one of his party near Mount Lindsay on 31 May 1840. After their conviction, Mullan and Nungavil were returned to Moreton Bay and hanged with about 100 Aboriginal people present, most of whom attended the funeral afterwards.

=== Landmark ===
After the cessation of milling operations there were discussions about possible future use of Brisbane's windmill tower. In December 1849 the tower was put up for auction and bought by a government official who promptly sought tenders for removal of it and its machinery (the auction terms required it to be cleared away by three months after the sale). Ownership of the place quickly reverted to the Crown because of a legal problem with the sale, but not before some dismantling had occurred. In a January 1850 article the Moreton Bay Courier continued its appeal for the windmill not to be pulled down and secured by the town, arguing that aside from its landmark and picturesque qualities it was the "best fixed point for land measurement in the district". In this vein the site was the most accessible viewing point for the picturesque landscape of Brisbane and its environs. Despite earlier calls to erase evidence of Brisbane's convict past, "sentiment and pragmatism combined to override the detrimental taint of convictism" saving the tower from destruction. The sails were still in place in 1854 and appear in a painting of the windmill completed in 1855.

=== Signal station and observatory ===
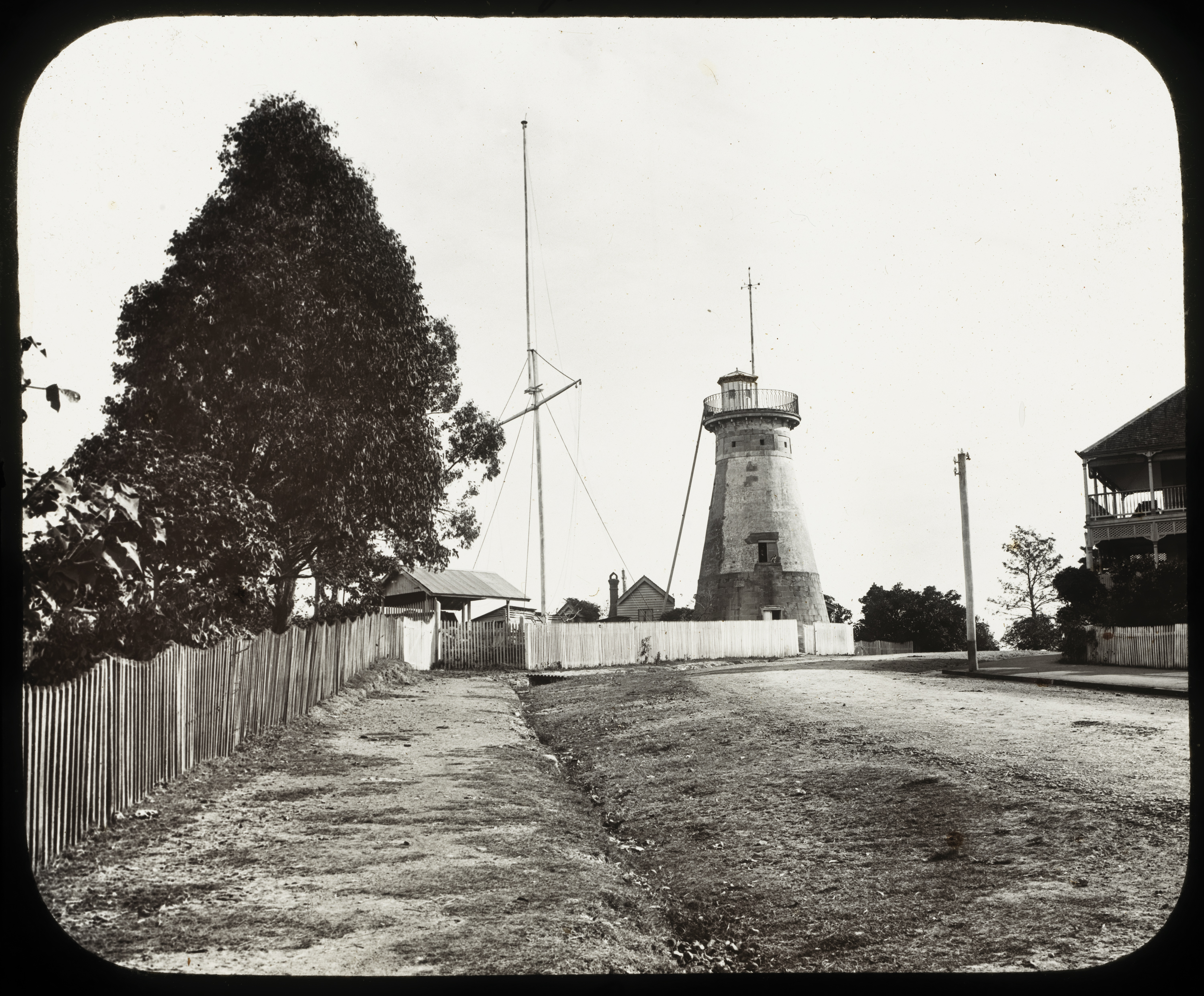
The Old Windmill signal Station, Brisbane, 1889-1901

By 1855 Brisbane was the leading Queensland port and it became important to establish signal stations to communicate shipping news between the entrance of the Brisbane River and the town, one of which was set up on Windmill Hill. This required modifications to the tower to include a semaphore station connected to the electric telegraph. Information on ships entering the river was converted to semaphore signals using flags hoisted on a mast erected on top of the tower. The renovations were undertaken by John Petrie in October 1861 to plans by colonial architect Charles Tiffin and included the removal of the windmill stocks or arms and wheels; the laying of floors on each storey; new doors and windows; a weatherproof floor on the top of the tower with an iron railing; a new winding staircase from bottom to top; repair of stone, brickwork and plastering; and the installation of a high flagstaff to fly signals. The tower's renovation at this time also fitted it out as a public observatory and it became known by that term.

A cottage for the signalman was constructed in 1883 to the immediate west of the tower to plans prepared by Government Architect FDG Stanley and on part of the Waterworks reserve. Two years later a detached kitchen was also constructed behind it to the south of the tower. Use of the signal station was discontinued in 1921 by the state government, which then sought a new use for the structure and land. Despite this the flagstaff remained in place until 1949. From January 1893 the Fire Brigade implemented a nightly observation post from a specially constructed platform on top of the tower. This was used until around 1922.

=== Museum ===
On 20 January 1862, the Old Windmill became the first home of the newly founded Queensland Museum; serving this purpose until 1868 when other accommodation was provided in the old convict barracks or parliamentary building on Queen Street.

=== Time keeping ===
Petrie also installed a time ball on the tower to provide a reliable authority for regulating clocks and watches. It was dropped at one o'clock each day based on observations relayed by telegraph from Sydney. The time ball was replaced by a time gun in 1866, with an embankment and shed constructed to hold the gun in 1874. After 1882 the gun and shed were moved to the eastern section of the current reserve before the shed was demolished in 1908. The time gun proved useful to people as far away as Logan, Caboolture and Ipswich. The old gun was replaced in 1888 with another before a new electrically controlled time ball was installed in 1894. This was associated with the legislated implementation of a single time throughout the colony, being designated as ten hours earlier than the mean time at Greenwich. Adjustments were made to the tower at this time to accommodate the new time ball. The roof was lowered and the flagstaff pared down.

After Federation, the Australian Government assumed responsibility for the site in 1901 but control reverted to the Queensland Government in 1908 when it was designated as an Observatory Reserve. In 1902 it had been connected to the Railway Telegraph Office at Roma Street so that the railways had the correct time for their operations. The evidence of historical photographs suggests that sometime between 1902 and 1912 the cabin at the top was increased in size. The time ball remained in operation until 1930.

Towards the end of the 19th century, the tower was encased in a cement render to protect the brick and masonry from rainwater damage. The current render dates from a 1988 refurbishment, and is scored to imitate the stone blocks it covers.

The site was placed under the trusteeship of the Brisbane City Council in 1922. The site of the cottage remained in the hands of the Waterworks Board and a boundary re-arrangement had to occur to allow its continued use in relation to the observatory.

=== Radio and telephony research ===
At this time the Queensland Institute of Radio Engineers began wireless radio and telephony research at the tower, and used the signalman's cottage to meet two nights a month. Apparatus to operate a wireless radio station was installed in 1926. The cottage was occupied on a more regular basis in order to reduce the risk of vandalism to the tower, but fell vacant. In 1926 the City Architect, AH Foster, proposed a plan for beautifying the observatory, which included removal of the cottage and adjacent sheds. The tender of Messrs Guyomar and Wright to remove the cottage, shed and outhouse for £60 was accepted. At this time the stone and wrought iron wall along Wickham Terrace was erected. It was intended to add "dignity to the historical reserve, and harmonise with the massive character of the Tower".

From 1922 to 1926 the tower served the Institute of Radio Engineers for meetings and experiments, Gympie Radio Pioneer A. E. Dillon 4CH, was the first experimenter to conduct Medium Wave tests and transmissions from this tower in late 1921 or early 1922. The Tower was ideally suited for this purpose as it commanded a panoramic view from Moreton Bay in the east, to Darling Downs on the western horizon. Nearby he erected a 150-foot (46 m) mast and strung an 80-foot (24 m) antenna between it and the Tower - the most impressive configuration of its kind in Queensland at the time.

From 1924 Thomas Elliott installed equipment in the tower to undertake cutting-edge television research; he and Allen Campbell giving a demonstration from the site in 1934 which constituted Queensland's first television broadcast. It was considered by many at the time as the most outstanding achievement thus far in the history of television in Australia. They gained a licence from the government and continued experimental broadcasting from the tower until about 1944.

During the 1930s and 1940s the tower was the venue for pioneer television broadcasting.

=== Tourist attraction ===
From 1945 the Brisbane City Council was considering suitable action to preserve the tower, which had become a popular visitor attraction. Some restoration work was carried out in 1950 on the advice of Frank Costello (then Officer in Charge of Planning and Building with the City Council), which included removal of old render and re-rendering the entire structure. It was at this time that the flagstaff was removed in preparation for making the open ground of the reserve "a real park". Certainly these conservation efforts considered the heritage value of the place as well as the public's use of it.

However, by 1962 the windmill tower was again in poor condition. Floodlighting to enhance its appearance for tourists was undertaken for the first time during the Warana Festival five years later. In the early 1970s the Council and the National Trust of Queensland undertook detailed investigations regarding restoration and transfer of trusteeship from the council to the trust (the latter were abandoned in 1976). None of the original plans or any of the original windmill machinery parts could be located at that time. Based on these findings the National Trust formed the opinion that the building should be preserved in its present form and not reconstructed to its windmill form.

In 1982 City Council undertook some external maintenance work on the observation house or cabin, including replacement of deteriorated timber to the balcony and sills, and corrugated iron on the roof, and repair of the time ball and its mast (which was shortened by about 300 millimetres (12 in) to remove some part affected by dry rot).

In 1987 a consortium of companies involved in the construction of the Central Plaza office building offered to assist the Brisbane City Council with the conservation of the Windmill Tower. To inform this work a conservation study was undertaken by Allom Lovell Marquis-Kyle Architects, which also oversaw conservation work. Preliminary archaeological investigations undertaken at this time identified the remains of the original flagstaff base which was reinstated. The conserved Windmill Tower was opened by the Lord Mayor of Brisbane, Sallyanne Atkinson, on 3 November 1988. A further archaeological investigation was carried out at the site in 1989–90 by a University of Queensland team, revealing clear stratigraphic layers datable to each of the key phases of use of the site. In August 1993 further investigations of the fabric of the tower were undertaken to explore the extent of the footings and the nature of construction of the curb and cap frame. More conservation work was carried out in May 1996.

In 2009 the Brisbane City Council received considerable funding to carry out restoration work of the windmill tower through the Queensland Government's Q150 Connecting Brisbane project. It was intended that the structure be publicly accessible to allow visitors to experience the view from its observation platform, a practice that has been commented on since the 1860s. In 2008–2009 the Brisbane CBD Archaeological Plan assessed the area of the observatory reserve and a length of Wickham Terrace associated with it as having exceptional archaeological research potential because of the combination of its association with the penal settlement and the low level of ground disturbance that has occurred there since.

=== Hauntings ===
Paranormal researcher Joe Nickell visited the windmill October 2015 after learning that local paranormal groups considered the site haunted. The stories relate to the deaths of two Aboriginal men who were hanged from the upper window. In his investigation Nickell confirmed these deaths happened, but it was impossible for the execution to have happened inside the tower as "ghost raconteurs" have suggested. An often reported "light in the window" story was found to be typical of ghostlore and according to Nickell, "a simple illusion". In all, the investigation resulted in Nickell stating that the stories of the Tower Mill hauntings are the work "of some percipient's faulty imagination or the creation of a writer of fakelore."

== Description ==
Circular in plan, the windmill tower is largely made of rendered stone and brick. It tapers towards the top where it is surmounted by an observation platform with an iron railing, hexagonal timber cabin or observation house, and time ball and timber mast. At its base the tower is approximately 8.4 metres (27 ft 7 in) in diameter, reducing to about 4.5 metres (14 ft 9 in) at the top. Excluding the time ball and its mast, it stands at about 16 metres (52 ft) in height on Wickham Terrace in Spring Hill, overlooking the modern office towers of Brisbane's central business district. The tower occupies the western end of the reserve, with the reconstructed flagstaff in its eastern half. Surrounding these is lawn. The boundary on Wickham Terrace is formed by a low stone wall with regular stone piers, between which are strung single chain guards, and a garden bed behind. About halfway along its length is a decorative iron archway and stone stairs leading up to a concrete path to the entrance door of the tower. The rear reserve boundary marked by a hedge adjoins that of the Spring Hill Reservoirs, the three gable roofs of which nestle below the park lawn. These are places flanked by parks, Wickham Park to the west and King Edward Park to the east. Opposite the windmill tower is the cylindrical Tower Mill Hotel, opened in c. 1968 deliberately referencing its form.

The tower sits on a circular sub-wall of Brisbane Tuff about 1,400 millimetres (55 in) thick, which is founded on bedrock. Standing on a plinth, the walls at the base are about 1,000 millimetres (39 in) thick, reducing at the top to about 650 millimetres (26 in). To the ground and first floors the walls are stone (ashlar with lime mortar) with 200-millimetre (7.9 in) deep outer stone lintels above the door and window. This has been referred to as the reefing stage at about 3,190mm above ground. The reefing stage for a windmill is an exterior platform from where the miller can turn the cap via an endless chain hanging from the cap and access the sails. The earliest images of the windmill at Brisbane, those by Bowerman from the 1850s appear to show some kind of encircling platform at this reefing stage level. A photograph taken during restoration work undertaken in 1988 while the render was being replaced seems to show a series of slots that may have held supports for a reefing stage. Behind these were middle and inner hardwood lintels, the former having been replaced with steel hollow sections in 1996.

From the second floor to the underside of the cantilevered balcony the walls are English bond clay brick except for a segment on part of the third floor (at about 10,500 to 13,000 millimetres (410 to 510 in) above ground) where the outer half of the wall is stone with brick inside. Some random stones run the full width of the wall here. Six narrow, regularly spaced windows open out of this wall segment. There are low rise brick arches above them and timber middle and inner lintels. In the brick above this segment, on the inside, there are curved hardwood plates (these appear to be the remains of the windmill's curb support, curb and cap frame cut down by Andrew Petrie in 1861 to provide clearance for the stairway). These timbers appear to have been locally sourced and comprise grey ironbark and spotted gum and yellow wood (Eucalyptus siderophloia, Eucalyptus maculata and Flindersia xanthoxyla].

The entire exterior surface is rendered in a mock ashlar finish (substantially renewed in 1988). However the brick section was not first rendered until the 1880s and the stone plinth not until circa 1900. A lip is created in the render surface at the first floor or reefing stage level. Above, below and around the upper ring of windows the render finish follows the simple stone frame. A single-level observation house and platform surmount the tower with a riveted copper time ball and painted hardwood mast projecting above it.

On the windmill tower's interior the single volume spaces of each floor are punctuated by the hexagonal stair which connects the ground with the observatory house. The ground floor is a concrete slab while the upper floors are timber-framed with timber floor boards of hoop pine (Araucaria cunninghamii). The stair winds around a central newel and is lined with tongue-and-groove vertical boards. The treads were strengthened and protected from further wear during the 1988 conservation work. The bottom of the stair posts are founded in the ground floor concrete slab. The stair timbers are largely red cedar (Toona australis), expect for the boarding, which is hoop pine.

The observation house is offset south of the tower's centreline and hexagonal in plan (the stairs are similarly offset). Its walls and five-faceted roof are timber-framed. Externally it is clad with chamferboards on the walls and metal sheeting on the roof. Internally it is lined with tongue-and-groove vertical boards. A door leads out to the circular balcony that surrounds it. The balustrade is wrought iron while the balcony floor is lined with flat copper sheets with timber duckboarding over. It is supported on the outside by closely spaced carved timber brackets. A round hardwood mast projects out of the roof of the cabin. It has a 160 square base, is lap-spliced inside the cabin to a 160 square post that carries down to the third floor. A riveted copper time-ball with central hole sits atop the cabin, with its hoisting rope running through top of the mast. As part of its function the time ball was raised to the top of the mast.

The tower has five casement windows: two opposite the door, one above the other, another above the door and two more higher up facing north and south. The tiny windows that currently provide illumination for the top floor under the observation cabin are a unique aspect. The sliding windows in the lookout or observation house were installed in 1988 to resemble the originals. The timber double entrance door at the base of the tower has a stone drip mould over it, as do the casements.

There is no clear sign of where the drive shaft from the external treadmill entered the tower, although the 1861 renovations may have disguised the entry point. The internal wall of the tower shows many signs of repair, any of which may be related to the treadmill operation. The ground floor wall of the tower shows a "closed-up opening" which may be the only surviving evidence of the location of the treadmill as the location where the shaft joining the two. The report does not give a location for this. Expert speculation about the format of the treadmill would suggest that the drive shaft connected to a short end of the treadmill.

The grounds surrounding the tower are grassed and sparsely landscaped and although there are no visible surface remnants, are likely to contain subsurface archaeological evidence of the use of the site over its entire history.

The sections of Wickham Terrace and Bartley Street included within the heritage boundary have exceptional potential to contain remains of the convict-era treadmill. The road infrastructure, including the road surface, lighting and signage, is not of cultural heritage significance.

== Heritage listing ==
Windmill Tower was listed on the Queensland Heritage Register on 21 October 1992 having satisfied the following criteria.

The place is important in demonstrating the evolution or pattern of Queensland's history.

The Windmill Tower in Spring Hill is tangible evidence of the initial European occupation of the Moreton Bay area and important physical evidence of the development of it as a penal settlement, free settlement and separate colony. It is the oldest convict-built structure surviving in Queensland and the oldest extant windmill tower in Australia.

The Windmill Tower is important in illustrating various key phases of the history of Brisbane. It has been used for a variety of purposes, including the grinding of grain and as a form of punishment for convicts, as a trigonometrical survey station, as a signal station for shipping, the Queensland Museum's first home, the official timekeeping device for the settlement, an observation tower, and as a site for wireless radio and telephony research and for early television research and broadcasting.

The place demonstrates rare, uncommon or endangered aspects of Queensland's cultural heritage.

The Windmill Tower is one of only two buildings to survive from the Moreton Bay penal settlement. It is distinctive amongst other early windmill towers around Australia in being the only surviving one built by convict labour. Other surviving towers, including the mill at South Perth in Western Australia (1837), the Callington Mill at Oatlands in Tasmania (1837), and the Mount Barker mill in South Australia (1842), were constructed by non-convict labour for free enterprise concerns.

The place has potential to yield information that will contribute to an understanding of Queensland's history.

The Windmill Tower has potential to contribute new knowledge and a greater understanding of Queensland's early settlement and development. Potential exists for archaeological evidence relating to all phases of occupation and use, particularly the convict period and evidence of the external treadmill layout and design, and the later signalman's cottage.

Archaeological investigations at the Windmill Tower have the potential to contribute important new information about actual treadmill design and construction techniques, early punishment practices employed in Moreton Bay, the domestic conditions of mid to late nineteenth century Brisbane through artefact analysis, as well other previously unknown or undocumented uses of the windmill tower site.

Archaeological evidence of the treadmill would illustrate nineteenth century punishment practices and the necessity of technological solutions for the grinding of enough grain to feed the fledgling settlement.

The place is important in demonstrating the principal characteristics of a particular class of cultural places.

Being the oldest extant windmill tower in Australia, and Queensland's oldest stone building, the Windmill Tower in Brisbane is an exemplar of this class of cultural place. Its height and location on a central Brisbane hilltop are also important in demonstrating the characteristics of an early signal station, lookout and site for wireless radio, telephony and early television research.

The place is important because of its aesthetic significance.

The Windmill Tower has great aesthetic significance for its landmark quality, being situated on a prominent hilltop overlooking central Brisbane; a quality widely acknowledged from the beginnings of free settlement until the present day. The unusual and characteristic shape of the structure is distinctive even in the earliest pictorial representations of the Brisbane landscape. Despite subsequent city development obscuring or entirely obliterating the views to it from other parts of the area, the windmill tower is still strongly evocative and symbolic of Queensland's convict past, one of its key periods of significance.

The place is important in demonstrating a high degree of creative or technical achievement at a particular period.

The use of the Windmill Tower as a signal station from 1855 demonstrates an aspect of innovative technology to develop a system of communication linking semaphore and electric telegraph to relay shipping news to the settlement. The tower is also an important reflection of the management of timekeeping in the nineteenth and early twentieth centuries through the use of time balls and a time gun at the site from 1861 until 1930. The earliest research in Queensland into wireless radio and telephony was undertaken at the tower from 1922. Cutting edge television technology was also researched and demonstrated at the tower from 1924 until at least 1949.

The place has a strong or special association with a particular community or cultural group for social, cultural or spiritual reasons.

The Windmill Tower has a special association with the Brisbane and Queensland communities, serving as an important landmark and being a tangible and symbolic representation of European settlement of the state. The tower was recognised as early as 1850 for its landmark and picturesque qualities in a swell of public support against its proposed demolition. This public interest has been ongoing, demonstrated in concerns voiced to the present day over renovation and restoration.

== In popular culture ==
In 2015 at the Urbne Festival in Brisbane, digital artist Alinta Krauth created the artwork, "Wind blisters those who try to run" exploring the history of the windmill, which was projected on the windmill during the festival.

== See also ==
- Andrew Petrie
- John Petrie

== Bibliography ==
- Heritage Unit, Department of Development and Planning (1996). The Windmill and Reservoirs Precinct: Conservation Plan, Parts 1 and 2. Brisbane City Council.
- Shaw, Barry, 1947–; Brisbane History Group (2010), Brisbane : people and places of Ashgrove (1st ed.), Brisbane History Group, ISBN 978-0-9751793-6-9
