= John Theophilus Desaguliers =

British philosopher (1683–1744)

John Theophilus Desaguliers FRS
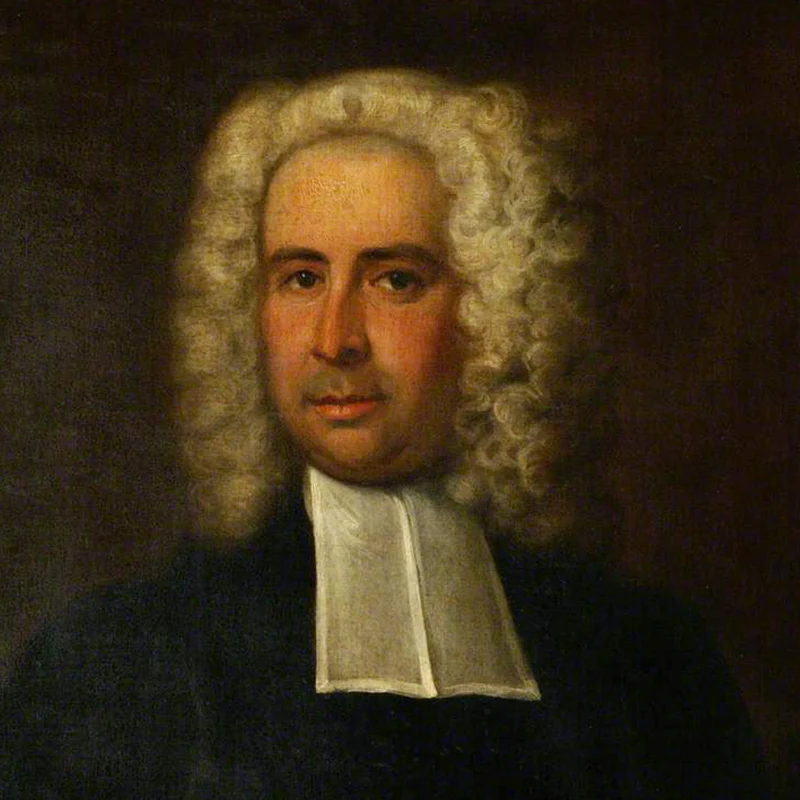
- Portrait by Jonathan Richardson
- Born: Jean Théophile Desaguliers; 12 March 1683; La Rochelle, France
- Died: 29 February 1744 (aged 60); Covent Garden, London
- Education: Christ Church, Oxford
- Known for: Dissemination of Newtonian ideas, planetarium, ventilation, hydraulics, steam engines
- Awards: FRS (1714); Copley Medal (1734, 1736, 1741)
- Scientific career
- Fields: Natural philosophy Engineering
- Workplaces: University of Oxford
- Academic advisors: John Keill
- Notable students: Stephen Demainbray; Willem 's Gravesande; Stephen Gray

Signature
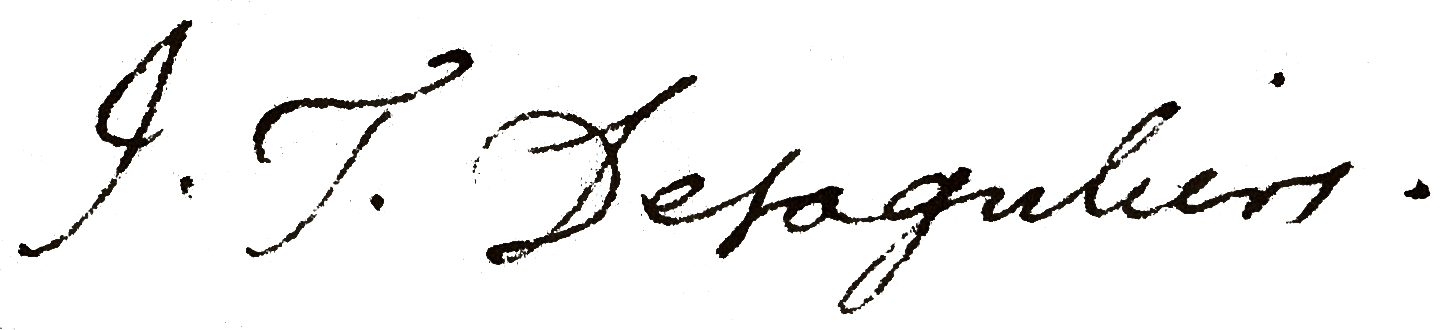

John Theophilus Desaguliers FRS (12 March 1683 – 29 February 1744) was a French-born British natural philosopher, clergyman, engineer and freemason who was elected to the Royal Society in 1714 as experimental assistant to Isaac Newton. He had studied at Oxford and later popularized Newtonian theories and their practical applications in public lectures. Desaguliers's most important patron was James Brydges, 1st Duke of Chandos. As a Freemason, Desaguliers was instrumental in the success of the first Grand Lodge in London in the early 1720s and served as its third Grand Master.

== Biography ==
=== Early life and education ===
Desaguliers was born in La Rochelle, several months after his father Jean Desaguliers, a Protestant minister, had been exiled as a Huguenot by the French government. Jean Desaguliers was ordained as an Anglican by Bishop Henry Compton of London, and sent to Guernsey. Meanwhile, the baby was baptised Jean Théophile Desaguliers in the Protestant Temple in La Rochelle, and he and his mother then escaped to join Jean in Guernsey.

In 1692, the family moved to London where Jean Desaguliers later set up a French school in Islington. He died in 1699. His son, who now used the anglicised name John Theophilus, attended Bishop Vesey's Grammar School in Sutton Coldfield until 1705 when he entered Christ Church, Oxford and followed the usual classical curriculum and graduated BA in 1709. He also attended lectures by John Keill, who used innovative demonstrations to illustrate difficult concepts of Newtonian natural philosophy. When Keill left Oxford in 1709 Desaguliers continued giving the lectures at Hart Hall, the forerunner of Hertford College, Oxford. He obtained a master's degree there in 1712. In 1719, Oxford granted him the honorary degree of Doctor of Civil Laws, after which he was often referred to as Dr Desaguliers. His doctorate was incorporated by Cambridge University in 1726.

Desaguliers was ordained as a deacon in 1710, at Fulham Palace, and as a priest in 1717, at Ely Palace in London.

=== Lecturer and promoter of Newtonian experimental philosophy ===
In 1712, Desaguliers moved back to London and advertised courses of public lectures in Experimental Philosophy. He was not the first to do this, but became the most successful, offering to speak in English, French or Latin. By the time of his death, he had given over 140 courses of some 20 lectures each on mechanics, hydrostatics, pneumatics, optics and astronomy. He kept his lectures up to date, published notes for his auditors, and designed his own apparatus, including a renowned planetarium to demonstrate the Solar System, and a machine to explain tidal motion. In 1717, Desaguliers lodged at Hampton Court and lectured in French to King George I and his family.

=== Demonstrator at the Royal Society ===
In 1714, Isaac Newton, President of the Royal Society, invited Desaguliers to replace Francis Hauksbee (1660–1713) as demonstrator at the Society's weekly meetings; he was soon thereafter made a Fellow of the Royal Society. Desaguliers promoted Newton's ideas and maintained the scientific nature of the meetings when Hans Sloane took over the Presidency after Newton died in 1727. Desaguliers contributed over 60 articles to the Philosophical Transactions of the Royal Society. He received the Society's prestigious Copley Medal in 1734, 1736 and 1741. The last award was for his summary of knowledge to date on the phenomenon of electricity. He had worked on this with Stephen Gray, who at one time lodged at the Desaguliers' home. Desaguliers's "Dissertation concerning Electricity" (1742), in which he coined the terms conductor and insulator, was awarded a gold medal by the Bordeaux Academy of Sciences.

=== Patronage of the Duke of Chandos ===
James Brydges, 1st Duke of Chandos appointed Desaguliers as his chaplain in 1716, but probably as much for his scientific expertise as his ecclesiastic duties. He was also gifted the living of St Lawrence Church, Little Stanmore, which was close to the Duke's mansion called Cannons, then under construction at nearby Edgware. The church was rebuilt in the baroque style in 1715. As the chapel at Cannons was not completed until 1720, the church was the location of first performances of the so-called Chandos Anthems by George Frideric Handel who was, in 1717/18, like Desaguliers, a member of the Duke's household.

The Cannons estate benefited from Desaguliers' scientific expertise which was applied to the elaborate water garden there. He was also technical adviser to an enterprise in which Chandos had invested, the York Buildings Company, which used steam-power to extract water from the Thames. In 1718, Desaguliers dedicated to the Duke his translation of Edme Mariotte's treatise on the motion of water. It is perhaps no coincidence that in the summer of 1718 Handel composed his opera Acis and Galatea for performance at Cannons. In this work the hero Acis is turned into a fountain, and since, by tradition, the work was first performed outside on the terraces overlooking the garden, a connection with Desaguliers' new water works seems probable.

Desaguliers advised the Duke of Chandos on many projects and appears to have been distracted from his parochial duties by his other interests. The Duke once complained that there were unreasonable delays in burying the dead but this was attributed to the curate who was left in charge of the church.

=== Engineering interests ===
Desaguliers applied his knowledge to practical applications. As well as his interest in steam engines and hydraulic engineering (in 1721 he cured a problem in the Edinburgh city water supply) he developed expertise in ventilation. He devised a more efficient fireplace which was used in the House of Lords and also invented the blowing wheel which removed stale air from the House of Commons for many years. Desaguliers studied the movements made by the human body when working as a machine. He befriended the strong man, Thomas Topham, and although there is no firm evidence that he used Topham as a body guard, Desaguliers recorded several of the feats that he performed.

Desaguliers was a parliamentary adviser to the board concerned with the first Westminster Bridge. This much-needed second crossing of the Thames was not completed until 1750, after his death, but construction work resulted in the demolition of Desaguliers's home in Channel Row.

Desaguliers also made significant contributions to the field of tribology. He was the first to recognise the possible role of adhesion in the friction process. For this contribution, he was named by Duncan Dowson as one of the 23 "Men of Tribology".

=== Freemasonry ===
Desaguliers was a member of the lodge which met at the Rummer & Grapes Tavern in Channel Row, Westminster, although that lodge later moved to the Horn Tavern in New Palace Yard. According to Rev. James Anderson, this lodge joined with three other lodges on 24 June 1717 to form what would become the Premier Grand Lodge of England. The new grand lodge grew rapidly as more lodges joined, and Desaguliers is remembered as being instrumental in its early success. He became the third Grand Master in 1719 and was later three times Deputy Grand Master. He helped James Anderson draw up the rules in the "Constitutions of the Freemasons", published in 1723, and he was active in the establishment of masonic charity. During a lecture trip to the Netherlands in 1731, Desaguliers initiated into Freemasonry Francis, Duke of Lorraine (1708–65) who later became Holy Roman Emperor. Desaguliers also presided when Frederick, Prince of Wales became a Freemason in 1731, and he additionally became a chaplain to the Prince.

=== Family ===
On 14 October 1712, John Theophilus Desaguliers married Joanna Pudsey, daughter of William and Anne Pudsey of Kidlington, near Oxford. For most of their married life, the couple lived at Channel Row, Westminster where Desaguliers gave the majority of his lectures. When forced to leave due to work on Westminster Bridge, they separated and John Theophilus took lodgings at the Bedford Coffee House in Covent Garden and carried on his lectures there. The Desaguliers had four sons and three daughters, for most of whom they acquired aristocratic godparents, but only two children survived beyond infancy: John Theophilus jnr (1718–1751) graduated from Oxford, became a clergyman, and died childless, while Thomas (1721–1780) had a distinguished military career in the Royal Artillery, rising to the rank of General. He became chief firemaster at the Arsenal, Woolwich, and seems to have been the first to be employed by the English army to apply scientific principles to the production of cannon and the powers of gunnery, for which he was elected a Fellow of the Royal Society. It was Thomas Desaguliers who in part designed and supervised the fireworks for the first performance of Handel's Music for the Royal Fireworks in Green Park. He later became an equerry to King George III.

=== Final years ===
John Theophilus Desaguliers had long suffered from gout. He died at his lodgings in the Bedford Coffee House on 29 February 1744 and was buried on 6 March 1744 in a prestigious location within the Savoy Chapel in London. The chapel was probably chosen for its Huguenot associations and in memory of Desaguliers's origins. The press announcements of his death referred to him as 'a gentleman universally known and esteemed'. In his will Desaguliers left his estate to his elder son who organised the publication of the second edition of his "Course of Experimental Philosophy". Although never a wealthy man, he did not die in poverty as suggested by the oft-quoted but inaccurate lines of the poet James Cawthorn:

How poor neglected Desaguiliers fell!
How he who taught two gracious kings to view
All Boyle ennobled, and all Bacon knew,
Died in a cell, without a friend to save,
Without a guinea, and without a grave.

These are taken from a long poem entitled "The Vanity of Human Enjoyment" (1749) in which the poet attempted to draw attention to the general lack of funding for men of science and not Desaguliers in particular.

== Portraits ==
There are two known engravings, by Peter Pelham and by James Tookey, taken from a lost portrait of Desaguliers painted in about 1725 by Hans Hysing, and an engraving by R. Scaddon of a Thomas Frye painting, also apparently lost, which showed the subject as an old man in 1743. An engraving by Etienne-Jehandier Desrochers was almost certainly made in 1735 when Desaguliers was on his only visit to Paris. There is also an oil attributed to Jonathan Richardson.

== Publications ==
Desaguliers wrote on many topics for the Philosophical Transactions of the Royal Society, produced several editions of notes for the auditors of his lectures and wrote occasional poetry. He translated technical works from French and Latin into English, often adding his own comments. His own Course of Experimental Philosophy was translated into Dutch and French.

=== Some original works ===
- A Sermon Preach’d before the King at Hampton Court (London, 1717)
- The Newtonian System of the World, the Best Model of Government: An Allegorical Poem (Westminster, 1728)
- A Course of Experimental Philosophy, 1st edition, Vol I (London, 1734) and Vol II (London 1744)
- A Dissertation Concerning Electricity (London, 1742)

=== Some translations ===
- Ozanam, Jacques, A Treatise of Fortification, (Oxford, 1711)
- Ozanam, Jacques, A Treatise of Gnomonicks, or Dialling, (Oxford, 1712)
- Gauger, Nicolas, Fires Improv’d: Being a New Method of Building Chimneys, (London, 1st ed., 1715; 2nd ed., 1736)
- Mariotte, Edmé, The Motion of Water and other Fluids, being a Treatise on Hydrostaticks, (London, 1718)
- 'sGravesande, Willem, Mathematical Elements of Natural Philosophy Confirmed by Experiment, or an Introduction to Sir Isaac Newton’s Philosophy (London, 1720)
- Pitcairn, Archibald, The Whole Works of Dr Archibald Pitcairn (treatise on physic translated from Latin in collaboration with George Sewell) (2nd ed., London, 1727).
- Vaucanson, Jacques, An Account of the Mechanism of an Automaton, (London, 1742)

== See also ==
- Electric charge
- Development of a practical steam engine
- Direct bonding
- Dynamometer
- Ventilation (architecture)

Masonic offices
Preceded by George Payne	Grand Master of the Premier; Grand Lodge of England; 1719–1720	Succeeded by George Payne
