= Gamaliel Massiot =

Gamaliel Massiot (c. 1700 – 1782) was a Huguenot artist who taught at the Royal Military Academy, Woolwich, and was appointed its first Drawing Master.

== Biography ==
Gamaliel Massiot grew up in a large Protestant family born in London to James and Jane Massiot. Originally members of an extended family in Western France, they had fled to England to escape religious persecution.

The Royal Military Academy appointed Massiot as its first Drawing Master on 6 December 1744. One pupil whom he influenced was the British Army Officer and artist Thomas Davies who joined the Academy as a Royal Artillery cadet in 1755. According to the Rules and Orders for the Royal Military Academy at Woolwich for 1764. Massiot then received £54 15s p.a., and he taught on Tuesdays, Thursdays and Saturdays in the forenoon. His classes included ‘Method of Sketching Ground, the Taking of Views, the Drawing of Civil Architecture and the Practice of Perspective’. In 1768 the artist Paul Sandby became senior Drawing Master but Massiot remained as second Drawing Master until shortly before his death in 1782. He then received £100 p.a.

A few years after his appointment Massiot moved house from Central London to Woolwich where he was assigned rooms in the Academy Tower. He later moved to nearby Plumstead in Kent. Gamaliel Massiot is now credited with a series of eleven drawings which are in the National Maritime Museum in Greenwich. They were bought at auction in 1916 by The Illustrated London News as being by an unknown artist and later donated to the Museum. Almost certainly made by Massiot during his time at Woolwich these depict the Royal Artillery’s grounds and workers in the Laboratory where ammunition was developed and manufactured. Apparently his only known works to survive, they show details of life in the Warren in the mid-eighteenth century; two examples appear in Carpenter’s paper' Another Huguenot, Lieutenant-General Thomas Desaguliers of the Royal Artillery was in charge of the Laboratory at Woolwich around the time that Massiot made his drawings.
