= Henry Goulburn =

British statesman (1784-1856)

The Right Honourable Henry Goulburn FRS
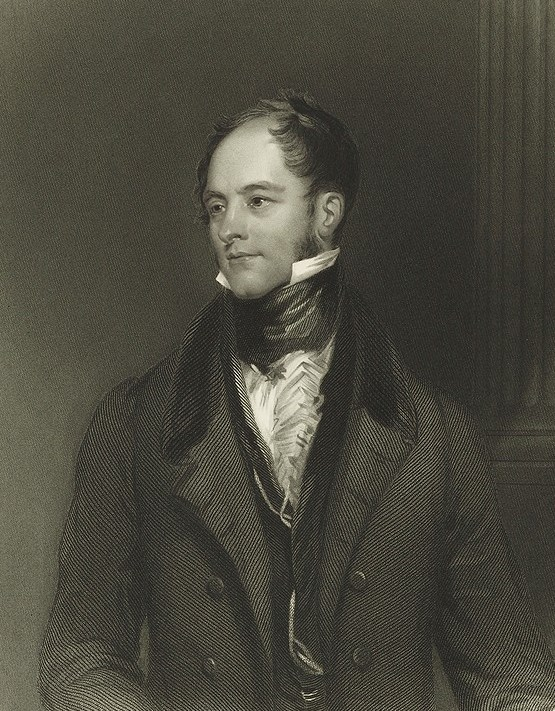
- Engraving by Henry William Pickersgill, c. 1850

Chancellor of the Exchequer
- In office 26 January 1828 – 22 November 1830
- Monarchs: George IV; William IV
- Prime Minister: The Duke of Wellington
- Preceded by: John Charles Herries
- Succeeded by: Viscount Althorp
- In office 3 September 1841 – 27 June 1846
- Monarch: Victoria
- Prime Minister: Sir Robert Peel, Bt
- Preceded by: Francis Baring
- Succeeded by: Sir Charles Wood, Bt

Home Secretary
- In office 15 December 1834 – 18 April 1835
- Monarch: William IV
- Prime Minister: Sir Robert Peel, Bt
- Preceded by: The Duke of Wellington
- Succeeded by: Lord John Russell

Chief Secretary for Ireland
- In office 29 December 1821 – 29 April 1827
- Monarch: George IV
- Prime Minister: Lord Liverpool
- Preceded by: Charles Grant
- Succeeded by: William Lamb
Junior Ministerial offices
Under-Secretary of State for the Home Department
In office February 1810 – August 1812
Prime Minister	Spencer Perceval
Preceded by	Charles Jenkinson, 3rd Earl of Liverpool
Succeeded by	John Hiley Addington
Under-Secretary of State for War and the Colonies
In office 1812–1821
Prime Minister	Lord Liverpool
Preceded by	Sir Robert Peel, Bt
Succeeded by	Robert Wilmot-Horton
Parliamentary offices
Member of Parliament for Cambridge University
In office 23 April 1831 – 12 January 1856 †
Preceded by	William Cavendish, 7th Duke of Devonshire
Succeeded by	Spencer Horatio Walpole
Member of Parliament for Armagh City
In office 1826–1831
Preceded by	William Stuart
Succeeded by	Henry Chetwynd-Talbot, 18th Earl of Shrewsbury

Personal details
- Born: 19 March 1784 London, Kingdom of Great Britain
- Died: 12 January 1856 (aged 71)
- Party: Tory; Peelite
- Spouse: Jane Montagu (m. 1811)
- Relations: Frederick Goulburn (Brother)
- Children: 4
- Education: Trinity College, Cambridge

Henry Goulburn PC FRS (19 March 1784 – 12 January 1856) was a British Conservative statesman and a member of the Peelite faction after 1846.

== Background and education ==
Born in London, Goulburn was the eldest son of a wealthy planter, Munbee Goulburn, of Amity Hall, Vere Parish, Jamaica, and his wife Susannah, eldest daughter of William Chetwynd, 4th Viscount Chetwynd. He was educated at Trinity College, Cambridge.

Goulburn lived in Betchworth, Dorking, in Betchworth House for much of his life.

== Sugar plantation owner ==
Goulburn's inheritance included a number of sugar estates in Jamaica, with Amity Hall in the parish of Vere, now Clarendon Parish, being the most important. Slave labour was still being used to work the sugar plantations when he inherited the estates.

Goulburn never visited Jamaica himself due to his health and political work. He relied on attorneys to manage his estates on his behalf. One attorney, in particular, Thomas Samson, held the top job at the estate from 1802 to 1818 and earned a reputation for cruelty towards Goulburn's slaves.

By 1818, the income from his Jamaican estates halved to less than £3,000 "although he did console himself that the condition of his slaves had probably improved".

In 1818, Henry Goulburn's brother was sent to inspect the Jamaican Sugar Plantation. Thomas Samson had already been dismissed over his treatment of slaves. Henry Goulburn wrote to Samson in June 1818:

"Since my brother’s return to England, I have had a great deal of conversation with him respecting the management of my Estate in Jamaica, the state of the Negroes and other particulars connected with it which from want of personal inspection of the property I have hitherto but imperfectly understood. The result had been a conviction upon my mind that as far as regards the negroes of the Estate, the system hitherto used by you had been founded altogether upon erroneous principles which (though I believe to be too commonly followed on the generality of estates in Jamaica) are such as I can never approve because I cannot consider them consistent with the duty which I owe to the negroes which belong to me....

You have recently been possessed of a considerable property which makes the management of my Estate less if at all an object to you... therefore your removal from Amity Hall cannot inconvenience you in a pecuniary point of view."

== Political career ==
=== Chancellor of the Exchequer ===
In 1808, Goulburn became Member of Parliament for Horsham. In 1810, he was appointed Under-Secretary of State for Home Affairs, and two and a half years later, he was made Under-Secretary of State for War and the Colonies. It was in this capacity that James Meehan named Goulburn, New South Wales after him, a naming that was ratified by Governor Lachlan Macquarie. Goulburn also was a negotiator at the Treaty of Ghent, serving on the British delegation from 1814-15. Still retaining office in the Tory government, he became a Privy Counsellor in 1821, and shortly afterwards was appointed Chief Secretary for Ireland, a position which he held until April 1827. Here, although he was frequently denounced as he was considered an Orangeman, he had a successful period of office on the whole, and in 1823 he managed to pass the Composition for Tithes (Ireland) Act 1823. In January 1828, he was made Chancellor of the Exchequer under the Duke of Wellington; like his leader, he disliked Roman Catholic emancipation, which he voted against in 1828.

In the finance domain, Goulburn's chief achievements were to reduce the interest rate on the part of the national debt and allow anyone to sell beer upon payment of a small annual fee, a complete change of policy about the drink traffic. Leaving office with Wellington in November 1830, Goulburn was Home Secretary under Sir Robert Peel for four months in 1835. When this statesman returned to office in September 1841, he became Chancellor of the Exchequer for the second time. Although Peel himself did some of the chancellor's work, Goulburn was responsible for a further reduction in the rate of interest on the national debt, and he aided his chief in the struggle, which ended in the repeal of the Corn Laws. With his colleagues, he left office in June 1846. After representing Horsham in the House of Commons for over four years, Goulburn was successively member for St Germans, for West Looe, and for the city of Armagh. In May 1831, he was elected for Cambridge University, and he retained this seat until his death.

According to the Legacies of British Slave-Ownership at the University College London, Goulburn was awarded a payment as a slave trader in the aftermath of the Slavery Abolition Act 1833 with the Slave Compensation Act 1837. The British Government took out a £15 million loan (worth £1.54 billion in 2025) with interest from Nathan Mayer Rothschild and Moses Montefiore which was subsequently paid off by the British taxpayers (ending in 2015). Goulburn was associated with two different claims, he owned 277 slaves in Jamaica and received a £5,601 payment at the time (worth £576,421 in 2025).

Goulburn was a member of the Canterbury Association from 27 March 1848.

== Family ==
Frederick Goulburn (1788–1837), the first Colonial Secretary of New South Wales, was his younger brother. Henry Goulburn married the Hon. Jane, third daughter of Matthew Montagu, 4th Baron Rokeby, in 1811. They had four children. He died on 12 January 1856, aged 71. His wife died the following year.

== Notes ==
Parliament of the United Kingdom
Preceded by Love Jones-Parry; Sir Samuel Romilly	Member of Parliament for Horsham; 1808–1812; With: Joseph Marryat	Succeeded by Sir Arthur Piggott; Robert Hurst
Preceded by Matthew Montagu; Charles Philip Yorke	Member of Parliament for St Germans; 1812–1818; With: William Henry Pringle	Succeeded by Seymour Bathurst; Charles Arbuthnot
Preceded by Henry Fitzgerald-de Ros; Sir Charles Hulse	Member of Parliament for West Looe; 1818–1826; With: Sir Charles Hulse	Succeeded by John Buller; Charles Buller
Preceded by William Stuart	Member of Parliament for Armagh; 1826–1831	Succeeded by Viscount Ingestre
Preceded by The Viscount Palmerston; William Cavendish	Member of Parliament for Cambridge University; 1831–1856 with William Yates Peel 1831–1832; Charles Manners-Sutton 1832–1835; Hon. Charles Law 1835–1850; Loftus Wigram 1850–1856	Succeeded by Loftus Wigram; Spencer Horatio Walpole
Political offices
Preceded by Charles Jenkinson	Under-Secretary of State for the Home Department; 1810–1812	Succeeded by John Hiley Addington
Preceded by Robert Peel	Under-Secretary of State for War and the Colonies; 1812–1821; With: Henry Edward Bunbury 1812–1816	Succeeded by R. W. Horton
Preceded by Charles Grant	Chief Secretary for Ireland; 1821–1827	Succeeded by William Lamb
Preceded by John Charles Herries	Chancellor of the Exchequer; 1828–1830	Succeeded by Viscount Althorp
Preceded by Viscount Duncannon	Home Secretary; 1834–1835	Succeeded by Lord John Russell
Preceded by Francis Baring	Chancellor of the Exchequer; 1841–1846	Succeeded by Sir Charles Wood
Church of England titles
Preceded by New post	Third Church Estates Commissioner; 1850–1856	Succeeded by Spencer Horatio Walpole
