= Viscount Chetwynd =

Title in the Peerage of Ireland

Viscountcy Chetwynd
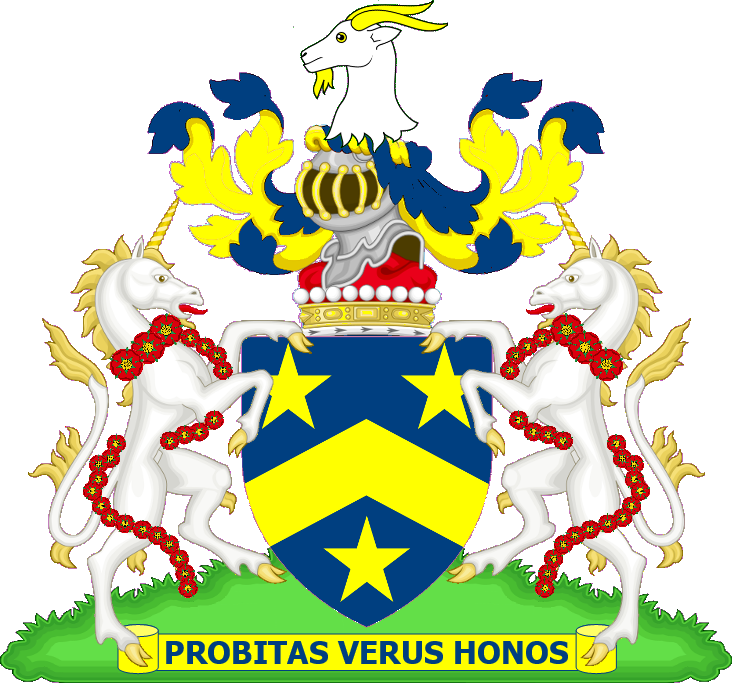
- Blazon Escutcheon: Azure a chevron between three mullets Or; Crest: A goat’s head erased Argent attired Or; Supporters: Two unicorns Argent each gorged with a chaplet of roses Gules barbed and seeded Proper thereto affixed reflexed over the back a line of roses as around the neck.
- Creation date: 29 June 1717
- Created by: George I
- Peerage: Peerage of Ireland
- First holder: Walter Chetwynd
- Present holder: Adam Chetwynd
- Heir apparent: The Hon. Connor Chetwynd
- Remainder to: Heirs male of the first viscount's father
- Subsidiary titles: Baron Rathdowne
- Status: Extant
- Former seat: Ingestre Hall
- Motto: Probitas Verus Honos

Viscount Chetwynd, of Bearhaven in the County of Kerry, is a title in the Peerage of Ireland. It was created in 1717 for Walter Chetwynd, with remainder to the issue male of his father John Chetwynd. He was made Baron Rathdowne, in the County of Dublin, at the same time, also in the Peerage of Ireland and with the same remainder. Chetwynd notably represented Stafford in the House of Commons on three occasions between 1702 and 1734, and also served as ambassador to Turin. He was succeeded according to the special remainders by his younger brother, the second Viscount, who sat as a Member of Parliament for St Mawes, Stockbridge and, from 1738 to 1747 for Stafford and served as ambassador to Madrid.

On the death of the second Viscount the titles passed to his younger brother, William, the third Viscount, who was Member of Parliament for Stafford and Plymouth and served as Master of the Mint from 1745 to 1769. The family estate at Ingestre Hall passed, however, to the second Viscount's daughter, whose son became Baron Talbot. William was succeeded by his son, the fourth Viscount who represented Stockbridge in the House of Commons. The library of the fifth Viscount was sold at auction on 18–19 May 1821 by R. H. Evans. A copy of the catalogue is held at Cambridge University Library (shelfmark Munby.c.124(3)). The fourth Viscount's great-great-grandson, the eighth Viscount, served as managing director of the National Shell Filling Factory at Chilwell in Nottinghamshire during the First World War. For his services to the war effort he was made a Companion of Honour in 1917. As of 2015 the titles are held by his great-grandson, the eleventh Viscount, who succeeded his father in 2015.

== Viscounts Chetwynd (1717) ==
- Walter Chetwynd, 1st Viscount Chetwynd (1678–1736)
- John Chetwynd, 2nd Viscount Chetwynd (c. 1680–1767)
- William Richard Chetwynd, 3rd Viscount Chetwynd (1684–1770)
- William Chetwynd, 4th Viscount Chetwynd (1721–1791)
- Richard Chetwynd, 5th Viscount Chetwynd (1757–1821)
- Richard Walter Chetwynd, 6th Viscount Chetwynd (1800–1879)
- Richard Walter Chetwynd, 7th Viscount Chetwynd (1823–1911)
- Godfrey John Boyle Chetwynd, 8th Viscount Chetwynd (1863–1936)
- Adam Duncan Chetwynd, 9th Viscount Chetwynd (1904–1965)
- Adam Richard John Casson Chetwynd, 10th Viscount Chetwynd (1935–2015)
- Adam Douglas Chetwynd, 11th Viscount Chetwynd (born 1969)

The heir apparent is the present holder's elder son the Hon. Connor Adam Chetwynd (born 2001)

== See also ==
- Chetwynd baronets
