= Thomas Topham =

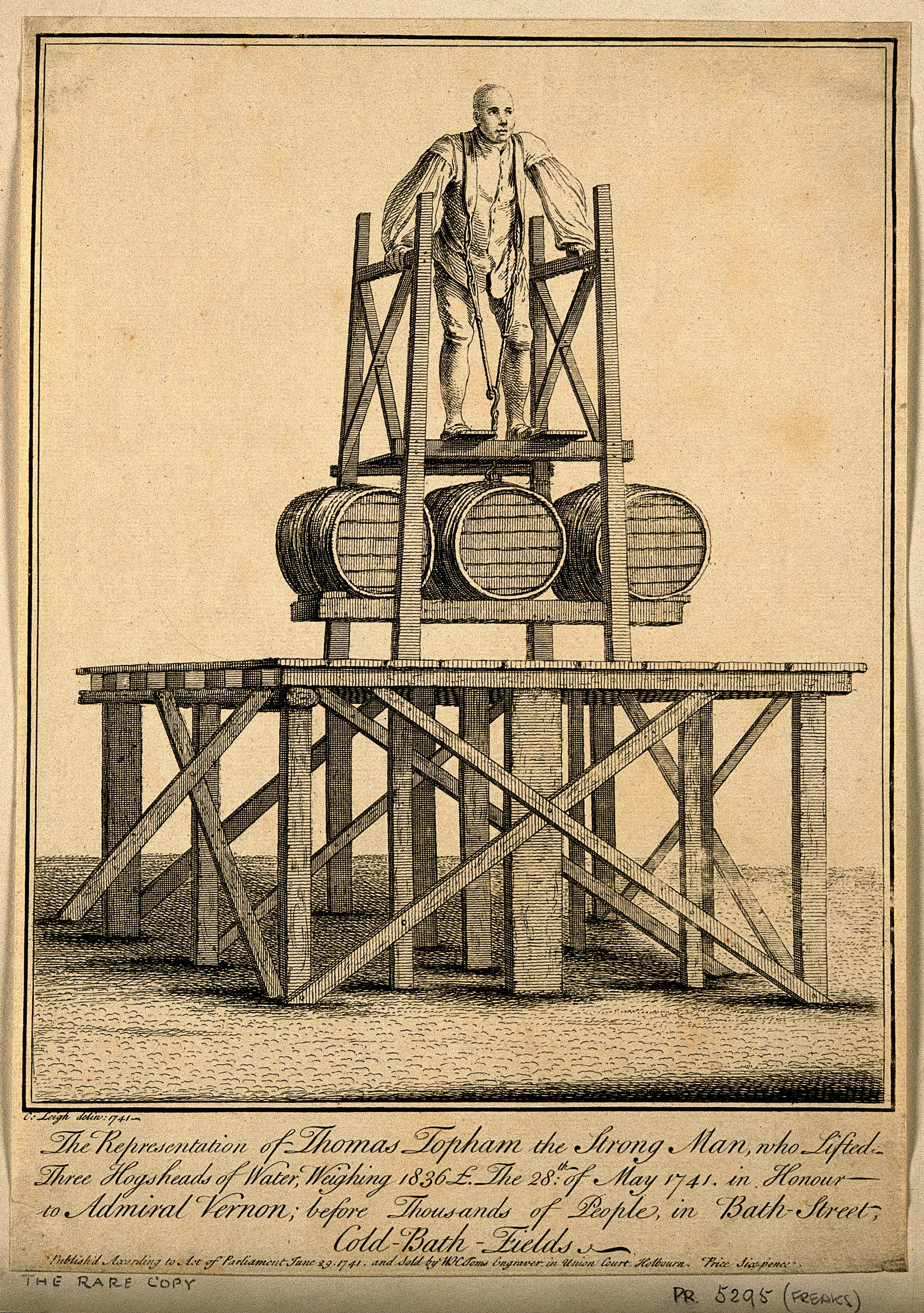
Thomas Topham lifting 1836 lbs

Thomas Topham (c. 1710 – 10 August 1749), of London, was a famous strongman of the 18th century.

== Life ==
Topham was the son of a carpenter who apprenticed him to his own trade. In early life he was landlord of the Red Lion Inn, near old St. Luke's Hospital, and although he failed there in business, soon gained profit and notoriety by his feats of strength. His first public exhibition consisted in pulling against a horse while lying on his back with his feet against the dwarf wall that divided Upper and Lower Moorfields. On 10 July 1734, a concert at Stationers' Hall, given for his benefit, was diversified by his herculean performances, and the woodcut on an extant programme (Burney Coll., Brit. Mus.) shows the strong man lying extended between two chairs, with a glass of wine in his right hand, and five gentlemen standing on his body. About this time, or later, he became landlord of the Duke's Head, a public-house in Cadd's Row (afterwards St. Alban's Place), near Islington Green.

Topham exhibited in Ireland (April 1737), Scotland, and at Macclesfield in Cheshire, where they were so impressed by his feats that they gave him a purse of gold and made him a burgess. At Derby he rolled up a pewter dish of seven pounds 'as a man rolls up a sheet of paper;’ twisted a kitchen spit round the neck of a local ostler who had insulted him, and lifted Mr Chambers, the vicar of All Saints who weighed 27 stone (380 lb; 170 kg), with one hand. He could lie on two chairs with four people standing on his body, which (we are told) he 'heaved at pleasure.' He further entertained the company with the song of 'Mad Tom,' though in a voice 'more terrible than sweet.'

On 28 May 1741, to celebrate the taking of Porto Bello by Admiral Edward Vernon, he performed at the Apple Tree Inn, formerly opposite Coldbath Fields Prison, London, in the presence of the admiral and numerous spectators. Here, standing on a wooden stage, he raised several inches from the ground three hogsheads of water weighing 1,836 pounds (833 kg), using for the purpose a strong rope and tackle passing over his shoulders. This performance is represented in an etching published by W. H. Toms in July 1741, from a drawing by C. Leigh. One night he is said to have carried a watchman in his box from Chiswell Street till he finally dropped his sleeping burden over the wall of Bunhill Fields burying-ground. Once, in the Hackney Road, he held back a horse and cart in spite of the driver's efforts to proceed. Dr. John Theophilus Desaguliers records, among other feats of Topham's witnessed by him, the bending of a large iron poker nearly to a right angle by striking it upon his bare left arm.

Desaguliers helped to make Topham famous, as he would take Topham to perform at meetings of the Royal Society, employed him as a personal bodyguard while he travelled and encouraged Topham to perform at places they visited.

In 1745, having left Islington, he was established as master of the Bell and Dragon, an inn in Hog Lane, St. Leonard's, Shoreditch. Here he exhibited for his usual charge of a shilling a head.

A dish of hard pewter, rolled up by Topham on 3 April 1737, is preserved in the British Museum, and is marked with the names of Dr. Desaguliers and others who witnessed the performance.

Topham was about five feet ten inches tall and muscular, but he walked with a slight limp. He is said to have been usually of a mild disposition; but, excited to frenzy by the infidelity of his wife, he stabbed her and then wounded himself so severely that he died a few days afterwards at the Bell and Dragon on 10 August 1749. He was buried in the church of St. Leonard's, Shoreditch.
