= List of fellows of the Royal Society elected in 1714 =

This is a list of fellows of the Royal Society elected in 1714.

== Fellows ==
- Nicholas Bernoulli (1687–1759)
- William Brattle (1662–1715)
- Thomas Bromfield (c. 1678–1722)
- John Theophilus Desaguliers (1683–1744)
- Martin Folkes (1690–1754)
- Thomas Jett (d. 1730)
- Robert Keck (c. 1686–1719)
- John Leveret (1662–1724)
- Alexander Danilovich Menicoff (? 1673–?1729)
- Richard Rawlinson (1690–1755)
- Johann Georg Steigertahl (c. 1667–c. 1740)
- Alexander Stuart (c. 1673–1742)
- Edmond Turner (fl. 1710–1722)
- Pierre Varignon (1654–1722)
- Thomas Watkins (fl. 1714–1729)
