= Music for the Royal Fireworks =

Suite for wind instruments by Handel

- Orchestral suite by George Frideric Handel
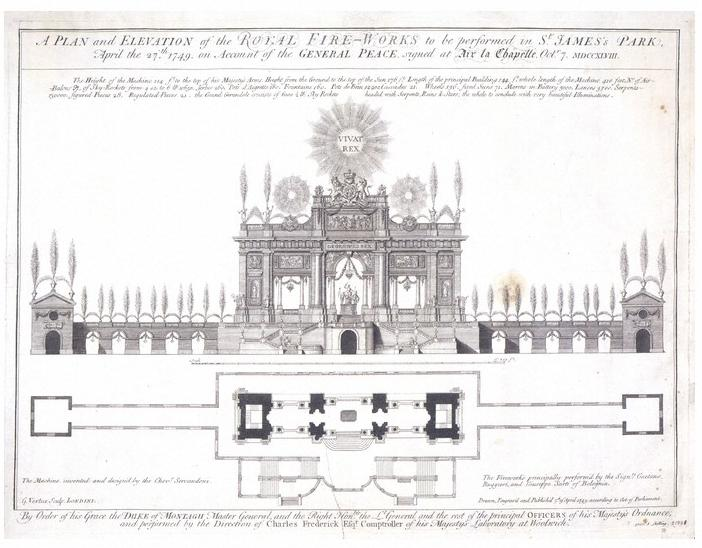
- Machine for the fireworks for the peace of Aix la Chapelle in May 1749 performed in Green Park; structure designed by Franco-Italian architect Giovanni Niccolò Servandoni
- Catalogue: HWV 351
- Year: 1749
- Period: Baroque
- Performed: 27 April 1749: London Green Park
- Movements: Five

The Music for the Royal Fireworks (HWV 351) is a suite in D major for wind instruments composed by George Frideric Handel in 1749 under contract of George II of Great Britain for the fireworks in London's Green Park on 27 April 1749 (Old Style; 8 May 1749 New Style). The music celebrates the end of the War of the Austrian Succession and the signing of the Treaty of Aix-la-Chapelle (Aachen) in 1748. The work was very popular when first performed and following Handel's death.

== Rehearsal and final production ==
During the preparations, Handel and John Montagu, Duke of Montagu, the Master-General of the Ordnance and the officer responsible for the Royal Fireworks, had an argument about adding violins. The duke made clear to Handel that King George had a preference for only martial instruments (winds and percussion), and hoped there would be "no fiddles". Handel omitted the string instruments against his will. Also, against Handel's will, there was a full rehearsal of the music in Vauxhall Gardens and not in Green Park. On 21 April 1749 (Old Style; 2 May 1749 New Style) an audience, claimed to be over twelve thousand people, each paying two shillings and six pence (half a crown) rushed to get there, causing a three-hour traffic jam of carriages on London Bridge, the only vehicular route to the area south of the river.

Six days later, on 27 April, the musicians performed in a specially constructed building designed by Servandoni, a theatre designer, assisted by four Italians. Andrea Casali and Andrea Soldi designed the decorations. The fireworks themselves were devised and controlled by Gaetano Ruggieri and Giuseppe Sarti, both from Bologna. (Note: "The Ruggieri family represents one of the longest surviving dynasties in the pyrotechnical trade; they later fired the celebrations for the French Revolution and were still around to supervise the display in New York Harbour when the Statue of Liberty was rededicated in 1986.") Charles Frederick was the controller, captain Thomas Desaguliers was the chief fire master. The display was not as successful as the music itself: the weather was rainy, causing many misfires, and in the middle of the show the right pavilion caught fire. Also, a woman's clothes were set on fire by a stray rocket and other fireworks burned two soldiers and blinded a third. Yet another soldier had his hand blown off during an earlier rehearsal for the 101 cannon which were used during the event.

== Music and instrumentation ==
I. Overture

II. Bourrée

III. La Paix: Largo alla siciliana

IV. La Réjouissance: Allegro

V. Menuets I and II

Music for the Royal Fireworks opens with a French overture and includes a bourrée and two minuets. The work is in five movements:

1. Overture (Adagio – Allegro – Lentement – Allegro)
2. Bourrée
3. La Paix (Largo alla siciliana)
4. La Réjouissance (Allegro)
5. Menuets I and II

It was scored for a large wind band ensemble consisting of 24 oboes, 12 bassoons and a contrabassoon (originally serpent, later scratched out), nine natural trumpets, nine natural horns, three pairs of timpani, and side drums which were given only the direction to play ad libitum; no side drum parts were written by Handel. Handel was specific about the numbers of instruments to each written part. In the overture there are assigned three players to each of the three trumpet parts; the 24 oboes are divided 12, 8 and 4; and the 12 bassoons are divided 8 and 4. The side drums were instructed when to play in La Réjouissance and the second Menuet, but very likely also played in the Ouverture.

Handel re-scored the suite for full orchestra for a performance on 27 May in the Foundling Hospital. Handel noted in the score that the violins were to play the oboe parts, the cellos and double basses the bassoon part, and the violas either a lower wind or bass part. The instruments from the original band instrumentation play all the movements in the revised orchestral edition except the Bourrée and the first Menuet, which are played by the oboes, bassoons, and strings alone.

== Recordings ==
I. Overture

II. Bourrée

III. La Paix

IV. La Réjouissance

V. Menuet
Organ version performed by Paul Ayres

There are many recordings of Music for the Royal Fireworks. Handel's Water Music, although it was composed more than thirty years earlier, is often paired with the Music for the Royal Fireworks as both were written for outdoor performance. Older recordings tend to use arrangements of Handel's score for the modern orchestra, for example, the arrangements by Hamilton Harty (1923) and Leopold Stokowski. Charles Mackerras´ 1959 recording for Pye Records marked a return to Handel's orchestration. More recent recordings tend to use more historically informed performance methods appropriate for baroque music and often use authentic instruments.

There are also arrangements for pipe organ, alone or with brass. In 1970, José Feliciano recorded for his Fireworks LP part of the work transcribed for classical guitar by himself.

This music was performed under the baton of Andrew Davis for the Golden Jubilee of Elizabeth II on 1 June 2002, at the Buckingham Palace gardens, complete with fireworks.
