= James Warner (surveyor) =

James Warner (1814–1891) was a pioneer surveyor in Queensland, Australia. Arriving at Moreton Bay penal colony in 1838, he was one of three surveyors who surveyed the area now Brisbane and its surrounding areas. He worked for 50 years in the Survey Office of Queensland, surveying and naming many towns and other features.

== Career ==
Warner was one of the three surveyors (the other two being Robert Dixon and Granville Stapylton) sent by New South Wales Governor George Gipps to the Moreton Bay penal colony, arriving on the Sarah Jane. Their first task was to make a coastal survey and then to survey Brisbane and the surrounding districts in preparation for the closure of the penal colony and the opening of the area for free settlement in 1842.

Following that task, Warner was sent to survey Ipswich.

Circa 1847 Warner's next major role was to survey the Port Curtis area as part in the attempted settlement of North Australia, a proposed new colony with its capital in Gladstone, which was initiated by the British Colonial Secretary William Ewart Gladstone but lasted two months as a change in the British Government saw Earl Grey become the British Colonial Secretary who cancelled the settlement. Due to communication with New South Wales being by sailing ship (a voyage of some months), the delays involved resulted in the settlement being established after it had been cancelled in Britain and then had to be abandoned when news of the cancellation eventually arrived.

Warner surveyed Queensland in a career spanning 50 years.

== Later life ==
Following his retirement in 1884 from the Survey Office, in September 1884 Warner was appointed Sergeant-at-Arms of the Queensland Legislative Assembly.

Warner died at age 77 at his residence Runneymeade in Albion on 6 May 1891 following a five-week illness. He was buried in the Toowong Cemetery on 7 May 1891.

== Published works ==
- Warner, James (1875), Traverse and other tables : compiled for the use of surveyors in the field and for students, Thorne & Greenwell

== Legacy ==
Dixon, Stapylton and Warner are commemorated on a plaque at the Land Centre, Woolloongabba in Brisbane (27.4848°S 153.0353°E). The plaque was placed by the Queensland Division of the Australian Institute of Surveyors and unveiled on 7 May 1989 by the Surveyor-General of Queensland K. J. Davies and the Surveyor-General of New South Wales D. M. Grant.
