= Robert Dixon (explorer) =

Australian surveyor and explorer

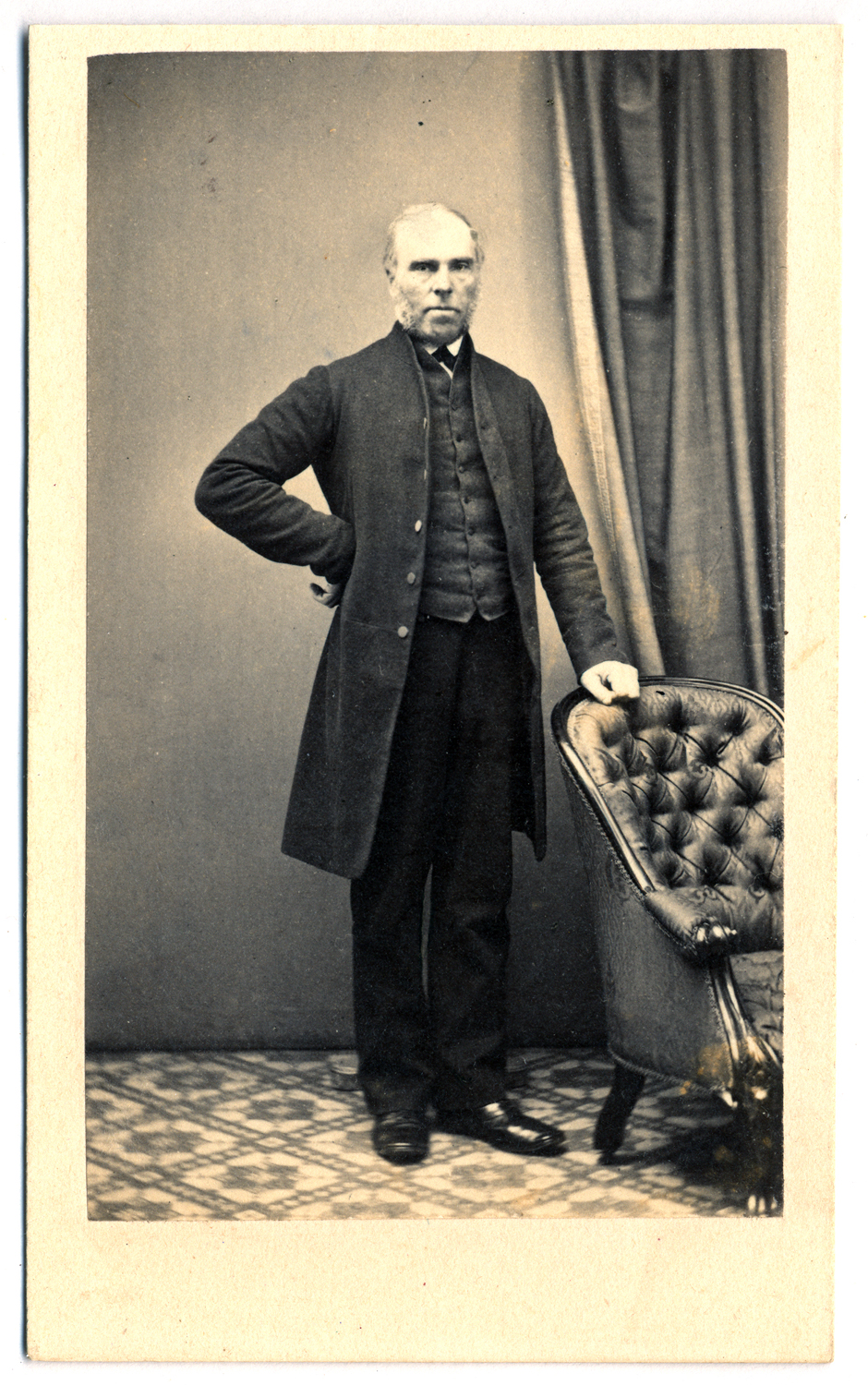
- Robert Dixon
- Born: 1800; Cockfield, County Durham, England
- Died: 8 April 1858; Sydney, Australia
- Occupation: Surveyor
- Spouse: Margaret Sibly
- Children: 6 (Langford Dangar, Joel and Jerome)
- Parent(s): James and Elizabeth

Robert Harald Lindsay Dixon (1800–1858) was an Australian surveyor and explorer, born in Cockfield, County Durham, England. Dixon is credited with having first surveyed and named a number of areas along the East Coast of Australia.

== Surveying expeditions ==
In 1831–32 Dixon carried out surveys in the Upper Hunter and New England districts.

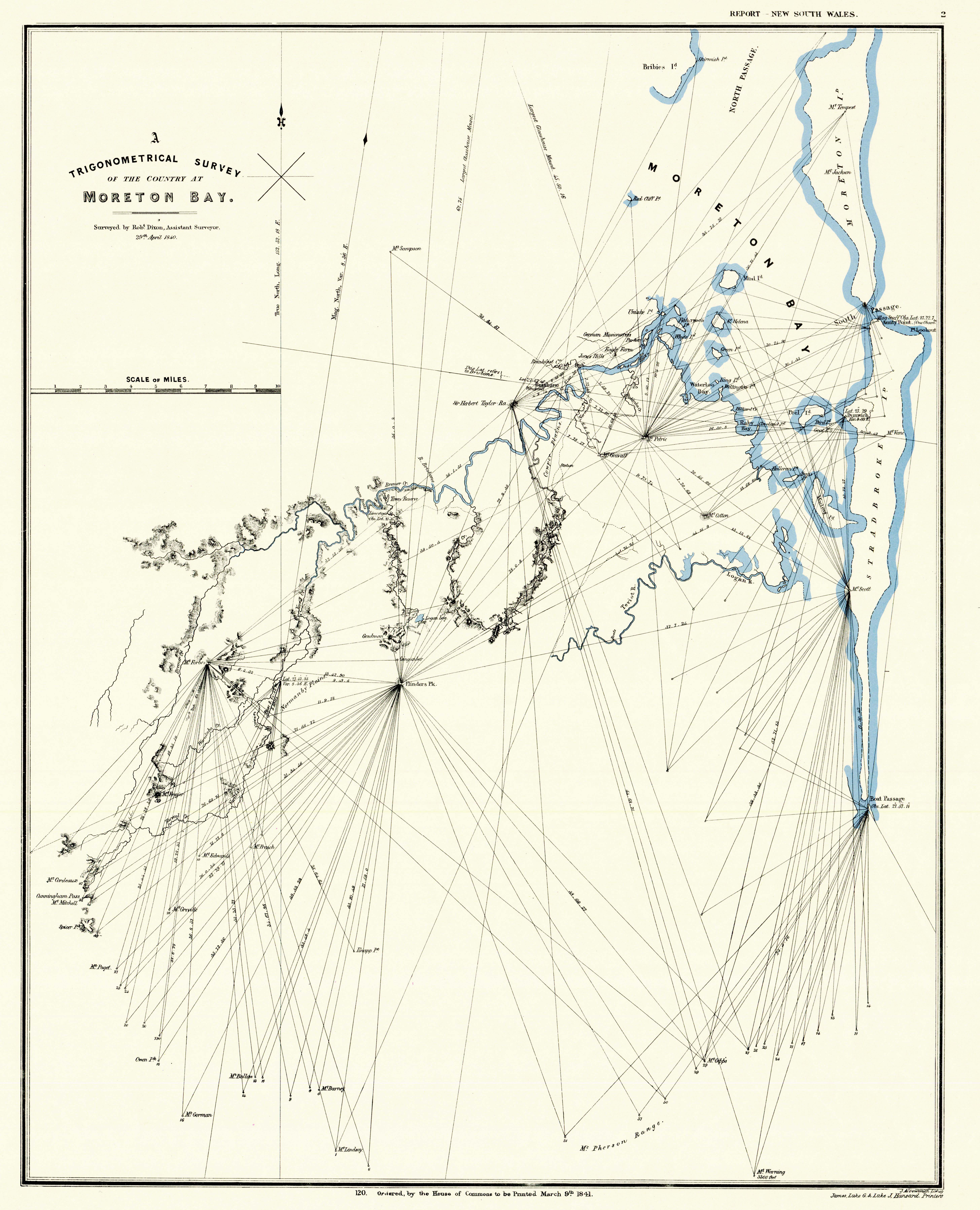
Dixon's Trigonometrical Survey of the Country at Moreton Bay, 1840

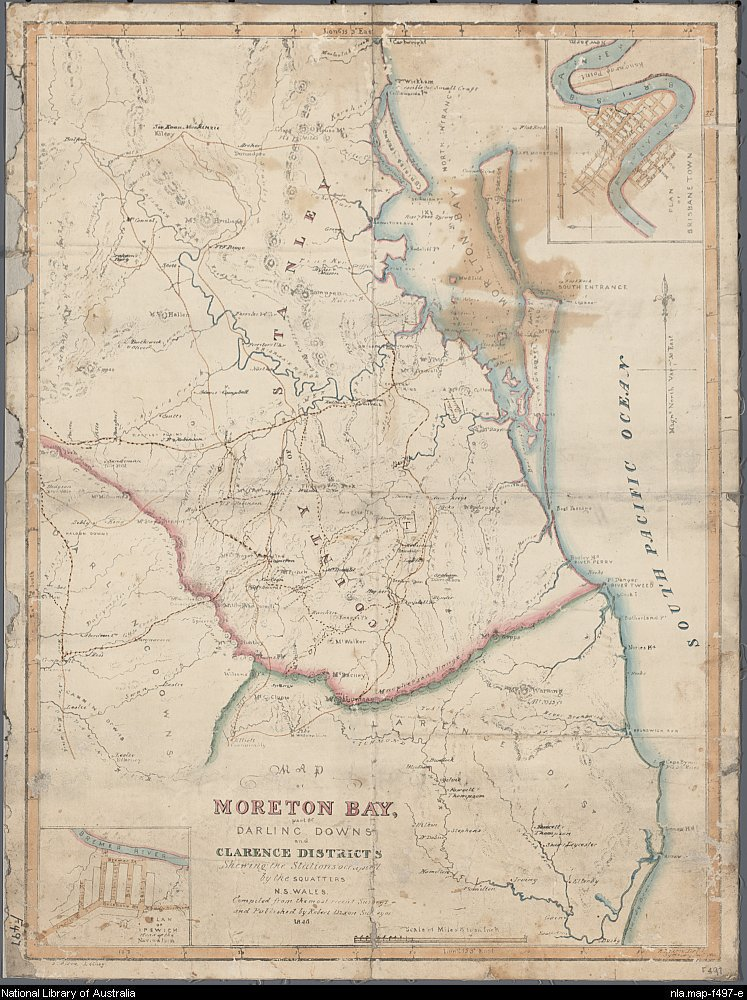
Dixon's map of Moreton Bay, 1845 or 1846

Having failed to gain reinstatement, Dixon moved to Moreton Bay. During that year, Dixon, with assistant surveyors Granville Stapylton and James Warner, began a trigonometrical survey of Moreton Bay for the Government to facilitate free settlement. A baseline of 3 miles (4.8 km) was measured on Normanby Plains (today's Harrisville, south of Ipswich) as a foundation for the triangulation. Dixon was instructed to compile a plan of the district for land sales and town reserves. This angered Governor Sir George Gipps.

Dixon is credited with having first surveyed and named a number of areas along the East Coast of Australia including:

- Cronulla, New South Wales – the named based on the Aboriginal word kurranulla.
- Gunnamatta Bay, New South Wales.
- The Oaks, New South Wales – and surrounding areas.
- Otford, New South Wales – originally named Bulgo by Dixon.
- Russell Island, Queensland.
- Wellington Point, Queensland.

== Legacy ==
Dixon, Stapylton and Warner are commemorated on a plaque at the Land Centre, Woolloongabba in Brisbane (27.4848°S 153.0353°E). The plaque was placed by the Queensland Division of the Australian Institute of Surveyors and unveiled on 7 May 1989 by the Surveyor-General of Queensland K. J. Davies and the Surveyor-General of New South Wales D. M. Grant.

== Personal life ==
On 24 July 1839 at Moreton Bay, he married Margaret Sibly, the daughter of James and Elizabeth Sibly of St Neot in Cornwall.

Dixon died, at age 58, on 8 April 1858 in Sydney. He was survived by his wife and three of their six children.
