= Frederick Goulburn =

Australian politician

Frederick Goulburn (1788 – 10 February 1837) was a British army officer and the first Colonial Secretary of New South Wales (1 January 1821 to 7 January 1826).

He was the third son of Munbee Goulburn of Portland Place London, and his wife Susannah; and was the younger brother of Henry Goulburn, under-secretary for the colonies 1812–1821 and later Chancellor of the Exchequer. He joined the army as a cornet in the 23rd Light Dragoons on 25 May 1805, transferred to the 13th Light Dragoons in June 1813 and fought in the Peninsular War and later at the Battle of Waterloo.

Goulburn was appointed secretary and registrar of the records of New South Wales on 30 June 1820, very likely due to his brother's patronage. He was sworn-in as Colonial Secretary on 1 January 1821.

Also in 1821 Thomas Brisbane was appointed Governor of New South Wales. He was doing useful work, but he could not escape the effects of the constant factional fights which also plagued previous governors. Brisbane discovered that Goulburn had been withholding documents from him and answering some without reference to him. In 1824 Brisbane reported his conduct to Lord Bathurst who was Secretary of State for War and the Colonies. In reply, Bathurst recalled both Brisbane and Goulburn in dispatches dated 29 December 1824.

Goulburn left New South Wales in February 1826 and died in Southgate, London, England on 10 February 1837.

New South Wales Legislative Council
| New creation | Nominated member December 1823 – December 1825 | Unknown |
Political offices
| New creation | Colonial Secretary of New South Wales; 1 Jan 1821 – 7 Jan 1826 | Succeeded by Alexander Macleay |
