= Thomas Desaguliers =

British Army general

Lieutenant-General Thomas Desaguliers FRS
- Born: 5 January 1721; Cannon Row, Westminster, Middlesex
- Died: 1 March 1780 (aged 59); Woolwich, Kent, England
- Military career
- Allegiance: Kingdom of Great Britain
- Branch: British Army
- Service years: 1740–1780
- Rank: Lieutenant-General
- Unit: Royal Artillery

Lieutenant-General Thomas Desaguliers FRS (5 January 1721 – 1 March 1780) was a British Army general and a Colonel Commandant of the Royal Artillery.

== Early life ==
Desaguliers was born 5 January 1721, the youngest son of Dr. John Theophilus Desaguliers. He was the grandson of Jean Desaguliers who, as Protestant pastor of Aytré, near La Rochelle, was exiled in 1682 prior to the revocation of the edict of Nantes. Jean was ordained in the Anglican Church, but served briefly as lecteur at the French chapel in Swallow Street, London.

As a young man Thomas Desaguliers was a Freemason who accompanied his father to masonic meetings and is mentioned in the 1738 edition of the Constitutions of the Freemasons. There is no evidence that he continued his masonic activity.

== Career ==
Desaguliers entered the Royal Regiment of Artillery as a cadet on 1 January 1740, and was promoted to second lieutenant on 1 September 1741, first lieutenant on 1 February 1742, captain-lieutenant on 3 April 1743, and captain on 1 January 1745. He first saw service in Flanders in 1744, when he joined the Royal Artillery train under Colonel William Belford, and remained on the continent until the close of the War of the Austrian Succession in 1748, being present at the battle of Fontenoy, as well as many minor engagements.

On his return to England, Captain Desaguliers was made chief firemaster at the Woolwich Arsenal on 1 April 1748, a post which he held for thirty-two years, until his death in 1780. The chief firemaster was the superintendent of the arsenal, and Desaguliers was the first scientific maker of cannon and the first regular investigator into the powers of gunnery in the English army. In 1749, he was among those who designed and supervised the fireworks for the first performance of Handel's Music for the Royal Fireworks. He was promoted to lieutenant-colonel on 5 February 1757.

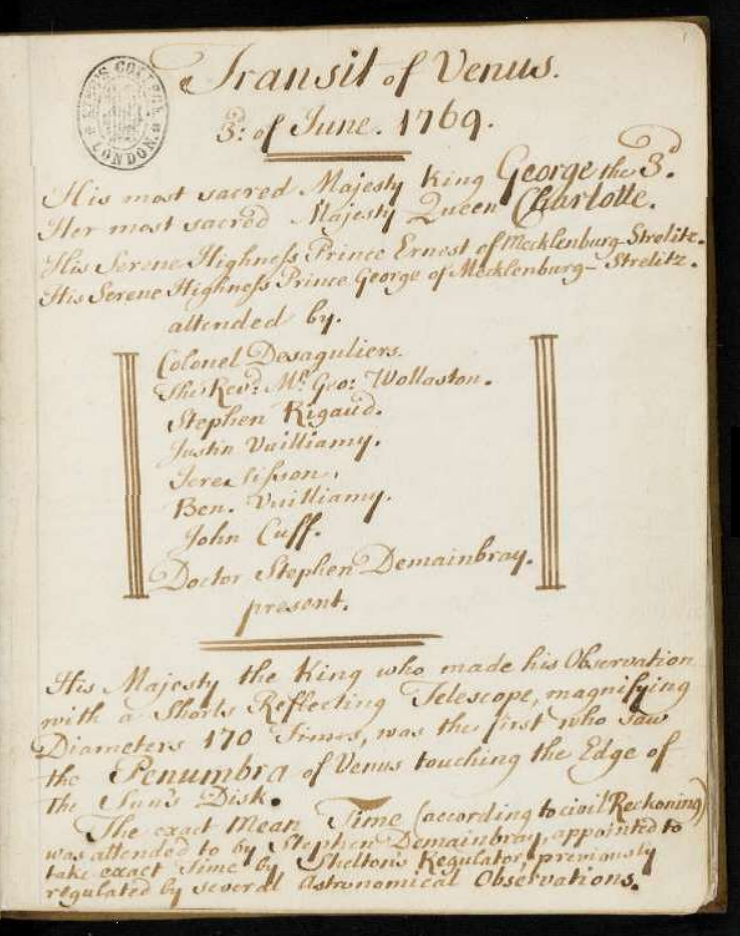
Extract from Observations on the Transit of Venus, a manuscript notebook from the collections of George III, showing Desaguliers' presence at the 1769 Transit of Venus observations at the King's Observatory in Richmond-upon-Thames.

In 1761 Desaguliers was summoned from his experiments and manufactures to take command of the siege train and the force of artillerymen intended to accompany the expedition to the island of Belleisle, off the western coast of France. This was the first opportunity to test on a large scale the improvements made in siege artillery since the days of Marlborough, and Desaguliers was able to put his ideas into practice. General Studholme Hodgson was in command, with Generals John Crauford, William Howe, John Burgoyne, and Guy Carleton under him. When Desaguliers arrived at Belleisle on 12 April with the temporary rank of brigadier-general, one unsuccessful attempt had already been made to disembark. Desaguliers at once volunteered to reconnoitre, and by putting some of his heavy guns into ships' boats, managed to cover the landing of the army. The island soon submitted, and General Hodgson directed Desaguliers to form the siege of the citadel. The manuscript journal which he kept during the siege of all his operations is preserved in the Royal Artillery Institution's Library at Woolwich, and forms the basis of the account given of the siege by Francis Duncan in his History of the Royal Regiment of Artillery. Desaguliers got thirty guns and thirty mortars into battery, fired 17,000 shot and 12,000 shells into the citadel. He had great difficulties to contend with owing to the flooding of the trenches, and was wounded himself five days before the capitulation of the fortress on 7 June.

On his return to England Desaguliers was promoted colonel and made colonel commandant of the Royal Artillery on 19 February 1762. He devoted himself for the rest of his life to his work at Woolwich. His work there was most valuable to the British military; he invented a method of firing small shot from mortars, and made the earliest experiments with rockets. On several occasions he demonstrated artillery to members of the Royal Family. Desaguliers' instrument was still in use at the royal gun factories for examining and verifying the bores of cannon in the late 19th century. He was promoted to major-general on 25 May 1772, and lieutenant-general on 29 September 1777.

In recognition of his scientific work Desaguliers was elected a fellow of the Royal Society on 24 February 1780, just before his death; he was the first officer of Royal Artillery who won that distinction.

== Personal life ==
On 18 March 1745, Desaguliers married Mary Blackwood (1727–1749) at St George's Chapel, Mayfair. She was the daughter of John Blackwood, art dealer, of Crayford, Kent, and a granddaughter of Admiral Sir Cloudsley Shovell. There is a posthumous portrait of Mary by William Hogarth. Together, they had three children before her death at the age of 23:

- Mary Catherine Desaguliers (1747–1814), who married Thomas Cartwright of Aynho, Northamptonshire. After his death, she married Sir Stephen Cotterell, Master of the Ceremonies to the King. She was executrix of her father's will.
- Anne Desaguliers (1748–1801), who married Robert Shuttleworth of Gawthorpe Hall, Lancashire, son of James Shuttleworth.
- Frederick Desaguliers (1749–1777), who joined the Royal Artillery as a cadet in 1762; he died a Second Lieutenant in 1777 at the Battle of Princeton during the American Revolutionary War.

Desaguliers never remarried after the early death of his wife. He had an estate, Graces near Little Baddow, Essex, as well as a London home. He demonstrated artillery to the Royal Family, was equerry to King George III and accompanied the monarch on morning horse rides. Desaguliers died unexpectedly on 1 March 1780. He was attended at Woolwich by the King's physician John Hunter (who had tended his wounds at Belle Isle) but succumbed to a ruptured spleen. He was buried alongside his wife at Crayford, where the grave still exists at St Paulinus church.

There is no known portrait of Thomas Desaguliers.

=== Descendants ===
Through his eldest daughter Mary, he is the ancestor of mathematician Dame Mary Lucy Cartwright.

Through his second daughter Anne, he was a great-grandfather of Janet Shuttleworth, who married the politician and philanthropist Sir James Kay (later Kay-Shuttleworth). A descendant, the present Lord Shuttleworth, is Lord Lieutenant of Lancashire.

== Notes ==
- This article incorporates text from a publication now in the public domain: Stephens, Henry Morse (1888). "Desaguliers, Thomas". In Stephen, Leslie (ed.). Dictionary of National Biography. Vol. 14. London: Smith, Elder & Co. p. 401–402. A more up to date version of the DNB article can be found online: "Desaguliers, Thomas (1721–1780)". Oxford Dictionary of National Biography (online ed.). Oxford University Press. doi:10.1093/ref:odnb/7540. (Subscription, Wikipedia Library access or UK public library membership required.)
