= Chief Secretary of New South Wales =

Australian political office

- Style: The Honourable
- Appointer: Governor of New South Wales
- Precursor: Colonial Secretary
- Formation: 1 January 1821
- First holder: Frederick Goulburn
- Abolished: 4 April 1995

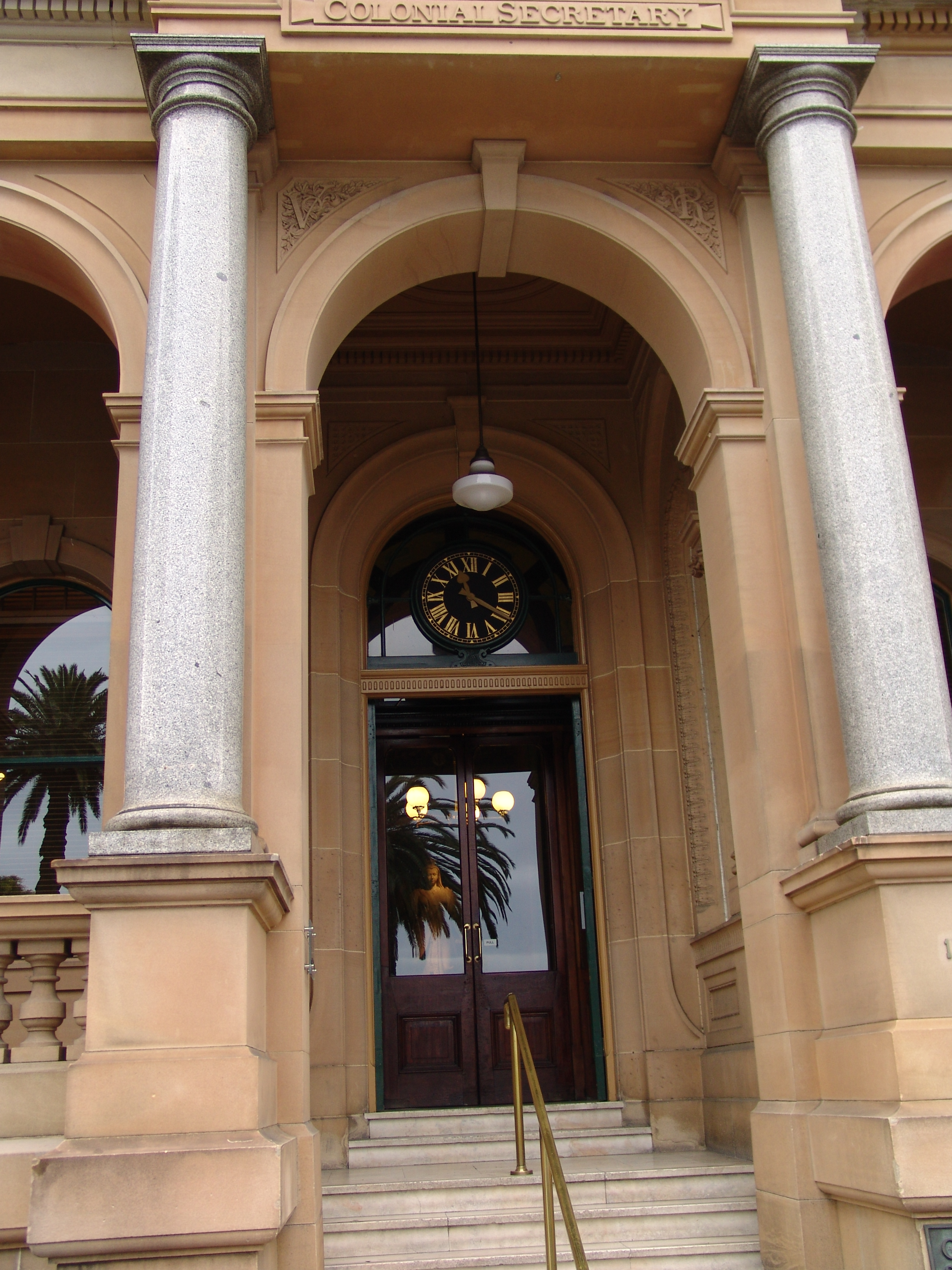
The Chief Secretary's Building in Macquarie Street, Sydney.

The Chief Secretary of New South Wales, known from 1821 to 1959 as the Colonial Secretary, was a key political office in state administration in New South Wales, and from 1901, a state in the Commonwealth of Australia. During much of the 19th century, the Colonial Secretary was the pre-eminent figure in public life. The role of the Chief Secretary changed significantly from the time of its creation in 1821 to its final use in 1995, with various responsibilities changing hands. Nominally subordinate to the Governor of New South Wales from the early 19th century until the beginning of full self-government in 1856, he was effectively a government record-keeper and the officer with responsibility for the general administration of the colony. However, for most of its history the Chief Secretary was in charge of all matters relating to correspondence with government departments, naturalisation, the Great Seal, state security, censorship and classification laws, the arts (to 1975), Public Health (to 1934), Aboriginal welfare (to 1969), Lord Howe Island, and environmental protection and fisheries.

== Role and responsibilities ==
The office of Colonial Secretary was created in 1821 to succeed the previous office of Secretary to the Governor, which had been the primary deputy to the Governor, representing the change from the absolute rule of the governor to the beginnings of self-government not only in NSW but also Australia. Originally having the role of the secretary to the Governor as well as secretary of the Colony this office was at first known as the Colonial Secretary or Principal Secretary. In 1804, Governor of New South Wales Philip Gidley King wrote that the Colonial Secretary "has the custody of all official papers and records belonging to the colony; transcribes the public despatches; charged with making out all grants, leases and other public Colonial instruments; also the care of numerous indents or lists sent with convicts of their terms of conviction, and every other official transaction relating to the Colony and Government; and is a situation of much responsibility and confidence." On 30 June 1820 Major Frederick Goulburn was commissioned as Colonial Secretary and Registrar of the Records of New South Wales, being sworn in on 1 January 1821. The role was initially an administrative role, serving as primary record-keeper and revenue collector, but also being responsible for ensuring the effective operation of government departments, for the Governor's Council and on the Legislative Council, of which they were an ex officio member.

After 1842 the Governor ceased to occupy a seat in the Legislative Council and thus the role of chief government spokesman and representative in the colonial legislature was taken up by the Colonial Secretary, thereby significantly increasing its role at a time prior to the development of the role of Premier. After the grant of full responsible government in 1856, this evolved to be a subordinate cabinet-level political position and not the role of a civil servant or government spokesman, although the office was generally held by the Premier until 1904. (Note: The exceptions were James Martin, who took the office of Attorney General in all 3 of his ministries, John Robertson who took the role of Secretary for Lands in his first ministry, as did James Farnell in his ministry, George Dibbs was Colonial Treasurer in his first ministry, as were Sir Patrick Jennings, Sir William Lyne and George Reid in their ministries.) From 1904 the Colonial Secretary was thus a government minister and was basically equivalent to the British Home Secretary. From 1859 the Colonial Secretary was referred to as the "Colonial Secretary" or "Chief Secretary to the Government", signifying the gradual use of the tern 'Chief' rather than 'Colonial' Secretary although it would not be officially changed until 1 April 1959 under the Ministers of the Crown Act 1959 (No. 4).

For most of the modern role of the Chief Secretary up to its penultimate abolition in 1975, the office had responsibilities for:

- The protection and welfare of the Aboriginal population.
- Lord Howe Island.
- Gaming, racing, betting and poker machines.
- Theatre regulation and licensing.
- Censorship and regulation of literature, art, films and plays.
- Custody of the great seal.
- Electoral matters
- Environmental protection and fisheries.

The role was revived briefly for the period of the Willis Ministry from January to May 1976, and was revived for the last time for the period of the Liberal/National Coalition government from 1988 to 1995.

The correspondence of the Colonial Secretary has become one of the most valuable sources of information on all aspects of the history of New South Wales and the early British settlement of Australia. Various indexes to the correspondence have been compiled, and that relating to the Moreton Bay Penal Settlement (Brisbane) and Queensland to 1860, has been developed by the State Library of Queensland.

== List of Colonial and Chief Secretaries of New South Wales ==
| Ordinal | Minister | Party | Title | Term start | Term end | Time in office | Notes |
|---|---|---|---|---|---|---|---|
| 1 | Frederick Goulburn | Prior to responsible government | Colonial Secretary | 1 January 1821 | 7 January 1826 | 5 years, 6 days | |
| 2 | Alexander Macleay | Prior to responsible government | Colonial Secretary | 8 January 1826 | 2 January 1837 | 10 years, 360 days | |
| 3 | Edward Deas Thomson | Prior to responsible government | Colonial Secretary | 2 January 1837 | 6 June 1856 | 19 years, 156 days | |
| 4 | Stuart Donaldson (Note: Concurrently Premier of New South Wales.) | No party | Colonial Secretary | 6 June 1856 | 25 August 1856 | 80 days | |
| 5 | Charles Cowper | No party | Colonial Secretary | 26 August 1856 | 2 October 1856 | 37 days | |
| 6 | Henry Parker | No party | Colonial Secretary | 3 October 1856 | 7 September 1857 | 339 days | |
| (5) | Charles Cowper | No party | Colonial Secretary | 7 September 1857 | 26 October 1859 | 2 years, 49 days | |
| 7 | William Forster | No party | Colonial Secretary | 27 October 1859 | 8 March 1860 | 133 days | |
| (5) | Charles Cowper (Note: Premier of New South Wales from 10 January 1861.) | No party | Colonial Secretary | 9 March 1860 | 15 October 1863 | 3 years, 220 days | |
| (7) | William Forster | No party | Colonial Secretary | 16 October 1863 | 2 February 1865 | 1 year, 109 days | |
| (5) | Charles Cowper | No party | Colonial Secretary | 3 February 1865 | 21 January 1866 | 352 days | |
| 8 | Henry Parkes | No party | Colonial Secretary | 22 January 1866 | 17 September 1868 | 2 years, 239 days | |
| 9 | Joseph Docker | No party | Colonial Secretary | 28 September 1868 | 26 October 1868 | 28 days | |
| 10 | John Robertson | No party | Colonial Secretary | 27 October 1868 | 12 January 1870 | 1 year, 77 days | |
| (5) | Charles Cowper | No party | Colonial Secretary | 13 January 1870 | 15 December 1870 | 336 days | |
| (10) | John Robertson | No party | Colonial Secretary | 16 December 1870 | 13 May 1872 | 1 year, 149 days | |
| 8) | Henry Parkes | No party | Colonial Secretary | 14 May 1872 | 8 February 1875 | 2 years, 270 days | |
| (10) | John Robertson | No party | Colonial Secretary | 9 February 1875 | 21 March 1877 | 2 years, 40 days | |
| (8) | Henry Parkes | No party | Colonial Secretary | 22 March 1877 | 16 August 1877 | 147 days | |
| (10) | Sir John Robertson | No party | Colonial Secretary | 17 August 1877 | 17 December 1877 | 122 days | |
| 11 | Michael Fitzpatrick | No party | Colonial Secretary | 18 December 1877 | 20 December 1878 | 1 year, 2 days | |
| (8) | Sir Henry Parkes | No party | Colonial Secretary | 21 December 1878 | 4 January 1883 | 4 years, 14 days | |
| 12 | Alexander Stuart | No party | Colonial Secretary | 5 January 1883 | 6 October 1885 | 2 years, 274 days | |
| 13 | George Dibbs | No party | Colonial Secretary | 7 October 1885 | 9 October 1885 | 2 days | |
| 14 | Sir Patrick Jennings | No party | Colonial Secretary | 10 October 1885 | 21 December 1885 | 72 days | |
| (10) | Sir John Robertson | No party | Colonial Secretary | 22 December 1885 | 22 February 1886 | 62 days | |
| (13) | George Dibbs | No party | Colonial Secretary | 26 February 1886 | 19 January 1887 | 327 days | |
| (8) | Sir Henry Parkes | Free Trade | Colonial Secretary | 25 January 1887 | 16 January 1889 | 1 year, 357 days | |
| (13) | George Dibbs | Protectionist | Colonial Secretary | 17 January 1889 | 7 March 1889 | 49 days | |
| (8) | Sir Henry Parkes | Free Trade | Colonial Secretary | 8 March 1889 | 23 October 1891 | 2 years, 229 days | |
| (13) | Sir George Dibbs | Protectionist | Colonial Secretary | 23 October 1891 | 2 August 1894 | 2 years, 283 days | |
| 15 | James Brunker | Free Trade | Colonial Secretary | 3 August 1894 | 13 September 1899 | 5 years, 41 days | |
| 16 | John See | Protectionist | Colonial Secretary | 14 September 1899 | 28 March 1901 | 4 years, 274 days | |
| 16 | John See | Progressive | Colonial Secretary | 28 March 1901 | 14 June 1904 | 4 years, 274 days | |
| 17 | John Perry | Progressive | Colonial Secretary | 15 June 1904 | 29 August 1904 | 75 days | |
| 18 | James Hogue | Liberal Reform | Colonial Secretary | 29 August 1904 | 13 May 1907 | 2 years, 257 days | |
| 19 | Thomas Waddell | Liberal Reform | Colonial Secretary | 14 May 1907 | 1 October 1907 | 140 days | |
| 20 | William Wood | Liberal Reform | Colonial Secretary | 2 October 1907 | 20 October 1910 | 3 years, 18 days | |
| 21 | Donald Macdonell | Labor | Colonial Secretary | 21 October 1910 | 26 October 1911 | 1 year, 5 days | |
| 22 | Fred Flowers | Labor | Colonial Secretary | 7 November 1911 | 26 November 1911 | 19 days | |
| 23 | James McGowen | Labor | Colonial Secretary | 27 November 1911 | 29 June 1913 | 1 year, 214 days | |
| 24 | William Holman | Labor | Colonial Secretary | 30 June 1913 | 29 January 1914 | 213 days | |
| 25 | John Cann | Labor | Colonial Secretary | 29 January 1914 | 15 March 1915 | 1 year, 45 days | |
| 26 | George Black | Labor | Colonial Secretary | 15 March 1915 | 15 November 1916 | 1 year, 245 days | |
| 27 | George Fuller | Nationalist | Colonial Secretary | 15 November 1916 | 12 April 1920 | 3 years, 149 days | |
| 28 | James Dooley (Note: Premier of New South Wales from 5 October 1921.) | Labor | Colonial Secretary | 21 April 1920 | 20 December 1921 | 1 year, 243 days | |
| 29 | Charles Oakes | Nationalist | Colonial Secretary | 20 December 1921 a.m. | 20 December 1921 p.m. | 7 hours | |
| (28) | James Dooley | Labor | Colonial Secretary | 20 December 1921 | 13 April 1922 | 114 days | |
| (29) | Charles Oakes | Nationalist | Colonial Secretary | 13 April 1922 | 17 June 1925 | 3 years, 65 days | |
| 30 | Carlo Lazzarini | Labor | Colonial Secretary | 17 June 1925 | 26 May 1927 | 1 year, 343 days | |
| 31 | Mark Gosling | Labor | Colonial Secretary | 27 May 1927 | 18 October 1927 | 144 days | |
| 32 | Albert Bruntnell | Nationalist | Colonial Secretary | 18 October 1927 | 31 January 1929 | 1 year, 105 days | |
| 33 | Thomas Bavin | Nationalist | Colonial Secretary | 1 February 1929 | 15 April 1929 | 73 days | |
| 34 | Frank Chaffey | Nationalist | Colonial Secretary | 16 April 1929 | 3 November 1930 | 1 year, 201 days | |
| (31) | Mark Gosling | Labor | Colonial Secretary | 4 November 1930 | 15 October 1931 | 1 year, 194 days | |
| (31) | Mark Gosling | Labor (NSW) | Colonial Secretary | 15 October 1931 | 16 May 1932 | 1 year, 194 days | |
| (34) | Frank Chaffey | United Australia | Colonial Secretary | 16 May 1932 | 13 April 1938 | 5 years, 332 days | |
| 35 | George Gollan | United Australia | Colonial Secretary | 13 April 1938 | 16 August 1939 | 1 year, 125 days | |
| 36 | Alwyn Tonking | United Australia | Colonial Secretary | 16 August 1939 | 16 May 1941 | 1 year, 273 days | |
| 37 | Jack Baddeley | Labor | Colonial Secretary | 16 May 1941 | 8 September 1949 | 8 years, 115 days | |
| 38 | James McGirr | Labor | Colonial Secretary | 8 September 1949 | 21 September 1949 | 13 days | |
| 39 | Claude Matthews | Labor | Colonial Secretary | 21 September 1949 | 30 June 1950 | 282 days | |
| 40 | Clive Evatt | Labor | Colonial Secretary | 30 June 1950 | 2 April 1952 | 1 year, 277 days | |
| 41 | Gus Kelly | Labor | Colonial Secretary | 3 April 1952 | 1 April 1959 | 13 years, 40 days | |
| 41 | Gus Kelly | Labor | Chief Secretary | 1 April 1959 | 13 May 1965 | 13 years, 40 days | |
| 42 | Eric Willis | Liberal | Chief Secretary | 13 May 1965 | 19 June 1972 | 7 years, 37 days | |
| 43 | Ian Griffith | Liberal | Chief Secretary | 19 June 1972 | 3 January 1975 | 2 years, 198 days | |
| 44 | Peter Coleman | Liberal | Chief Secretary | 23 January 1976 | 14 May 1976 | 112 days | |
| 45 | Garry West | National | Chief Secretary | 25 March 1988 | 24 July 1990 | 2 years, 121 days | |
| 46 | Ian Causley | National | Chief Secretary | 24 July 1990 | 6 June 1991 | 317 days | |
| 47 | Anne Cohen | Liberal | Chief Secretary | 6 June 1991 | 4 April 1995 | 3 years, 302 days | |
