= Granville William Chetwynd Stapylton =

Granville William Chetwynd Stapylton (1800–1840) was a pioneer explorer and surveyor in Australia.

In 1839, Stapylton was one of the three surveyors (the other two being Robert Dixon and James Warner) sent by New South Wales Governor George Gipps to the Moreton Bay penal colony, arriving on the Sarah Jane. Their first task was to make a coastal survey of Moreton Bay and then to survey Brisbane and the surrounding districts in preparation for the closure of the penal colony and the opening of the area for free settlement in 1842.

He was killed on 31 May 1840 by Aboriginal people while surveying, 14 miles (23 km) east of Mount Lindesay.

== Legacy ==
The locality of Stapylton in the City of Gold Coast is named after him.

Robert Dixon, Stapylton and James Warner are commemorated on a plaque at the Land Centre, Woolloongabba in Brisbane (27.4848°S 153.0353°E). The plaque was placed by the Queensland Division of the Australian Institute of Surveyors and unveiled on 7 May 1989 by the Surveyor-General of Queensland K. J. Davies and the Surveyor-General of New South Wales D. M. Grant.
