= Grove Street Pensioners' Cottages =

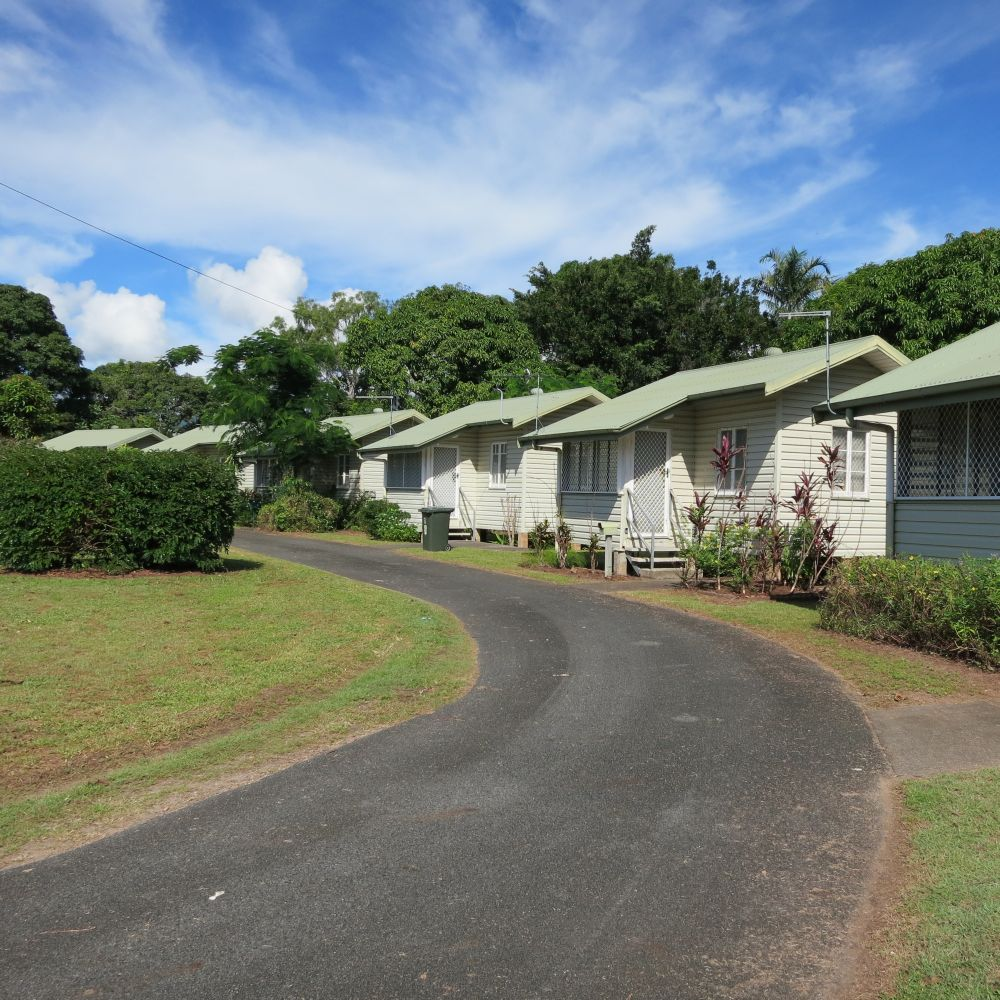
- View southwest along cottages and driveway, 2017

- Location within Queensland
- 16.9156°S 145.7618°E
- Location: 28D Grove Street, Parramatta Park, Cairns Region, Queensland, Australia

History
- Design period: 1940s–1960s (Post-WWII)
- Built: 1953–1958, 1953–1960

Site notes
- Architect: Cairns City Council

Queensland Heritage Register
- Official name: Grove Street Pensioners' Cottages
- Type: state heritage
- Designated: 24 August 2017
- Reference no.: 602832
- Type: Residential: Other – residential
- Theme: Building settlements, towns, cities and dwellings: Dwellings; Providing health and welfare services: Caring for the aged and infirm

Grove Street Pensioners' Cottages is a heritage-listed house at 28D Grove Street, Parramatta Park, Cairns, Cairns Region, Queensland, Australia. They were designed by the Cairns City Council and built from 1953 to 1958. They were added to the Queensland Heritage Register on 24 August 2017 amidst some controversy as their heritage listing would prevent the redevelopment of the site for affordable housing.

== History ==
The Grove Street Pensioners' Cottages were built by Cairns City Council from 1953 to c. 1958 as part of a scheme subsidised by the Queensland Government for providing affordable accommodation for old age pensioners. Located on a reserve in Grove Street in the Cairns suburb of Parramatta Park, the complex comprises eight small timber cottages arranged in a curved layout surrounded by lawns and gardens. They were the first of their type to be built in Cairns and are an important surviving example of a largely intact pensioners' cottages scheme.

The city of Cairns in tropical far north Queensland was established in 1876 as a port to service the newly discovered Hodgkinson goldfields, and its first local authority, the Cairns Divisional Board, was established in 1879. Initial progress was slow until the establishment of a local sugar industry and the opening up of the Atherton Tableland's mineral fields in the early 1880s. Early industries in the region, such as sugar farming and timber harvesting, created a demand for improved transport facilities to the harbour. In 1885 Cairns was constituted a municipality, and the announcement that Cairns was to be the terminus for the Herberton railway established the town as the principal port in the region.

Progress and growth continued in the early 20th century. The Cairns Municipal Council became the Cairns Town Council on 31 March 1903, which in turn became the Cairns City Council on 13 October 1923. By this stage the population had reached 8000. This rose to 12,000 by 1933, and 15,700 by 1941. After the disruption of World War II, post-war optimism and prosperity saw development increase and the population grow to 21,018 by June 1954. Of this number, 2099 Cairns residents, (approximately 10% of the population) were aged 60 and over.

Queensland's social fabric is supported by a network of social security and welfare services provided by the Queensland and Australian Governments and voluntary organisations to disadvantaged persons. Until the late-19th century, however, no such government aid existed in Queensland, with most of the responsibility for providing relief falling upon voluntary organisations. In the 1890s, the Queensland Government provided residential institutions and subsidies to voluntary organisations in aid of orphans, the mentally ill, the destitute, the aged, and the infirm. The Dunwich Benevolent Asylum on North Stradbroke Island (established 1866, closed 1945), operated with minimal services and at times could not meet demand for admission. Factors such as increased longevity and the 1890s economic depression saw many families unable to care for aged relatives, and with the system of private charity proving inadequate, the Queensland Government was forced to act.

In 1907 Queensland implemented a system of non-contributory age pensions, followed shortly after by the Australian Government, which provided a national system in 1909. The intention of the pension scheme was to provide relief for the aged poor that did not involve the stigma associated with charitable aid, or take away individuals' freedom. The age pension was initially 10 shillings a week, available to males and females aged 65 years and over (lowered to 60 years for females in 1910) and to persons aged 60–64 who were permanently incapacitated for work. It was subject to a character and residence test with limitations imposed on income and property.

The site of the Grove Street Pensioners' Cottages in the Cairns suburb of Parramatta Park has a long history of accommodating poor and aged Cairns residents. It was originally part of a railway reserve, with the first stage of the Cairns railway line (constructed 1886–87) running through it. The railway line was deviated in 1910–11 to its present position on the north-eastern side of Lily Creek, and over the following decades negotiations and disagreements about how to use the former railway land (known as the Martyn Street reserve) took place between Cairns City Council and the Queensland Government.

In 1921 part of the Martyn Street reserve, south of Grove Street, was allocated as a site for old age pensioners to reside. Pensioners' reserves, where old age pensioners unable to afford other forms of accommodation could build themselves a hut or shelter to live in, existed in many Queensland towns and some suburbs of Brisbane in the early 20th century. Administered by the local authorities, who issued permits to pensioners wishing to reside there, it was a cheap but ultimately inadequate way of housing the poorest members of the community. Self-built huts were not connected to water or electricity and were vulnerable to bad weather and being destroyed by fire. Several pensioners' reserves existed at different times in Cairns, including one at Bungalow.

A proposal to provide better accommodation for Cairns pensioners was considered by Cairns City Council in September 1926, when the Works Committee recommended that three cottages be erected by the council, to be let at a nominal rental to approved local pensioners. An article in The Cairns Post on 27 November 1926 stated that the council had approved the scheme, however whether or not these cottages were constructed is unclear, as shortly afterwards the pensioners were relocated further north within the Martyn Street reserve, to an area on the southern side of Charles Street. By September 1928 this area had been partly fenced and a water source provided. It was here that the pensioners established themselves, living in tents and small self-built huts.

Between 1910 and 1950 the number of old age pensioners in Queensland rose from 8,561 to 45,937. As the population grew and the pension rate failed to keep pace with rising costs of living, pensioners found it increasingly difficult to afford decent accommodation. A Courier Mail article printed in June 1950 summed up the housing plight faced by hundreds of pensioners living a "hand to mouth" existence, with a lack of proper accommodation forcing many of them to live in small rooms with inadequate facilities. Homes for the aged were too few to handle the number of pensioners seeking accommodation, with at least 1000 waiting for admission to homes in the Brisbane area alone.

From the 1920s the Queensland Government had established institutions for the aged, infirm and/or destitute in different parts of the state. The first purpose-built government home for the aged, named "Eventide", was opened at Charters Towers in 1929, providing accommodation for 150 inmates. Unlike the Dunwich asylum, which housed inmates in large dormitories, Charters Towers inmates were provided with "single and double huts, each having its own small garden plot". In 1945, the Dunwich asylum was closed and the inmates transferred to a former Royal Australia Air Force (RAAF) station at Sandgate. Also named "Eventide", this institution became the principal government aged care facility in southern Queensland. A third "Eventide" was opened in Rockhampton in 1950, offering similar hut accommodation to Charters Towers, arranged within a complex including hospital wards, a workshop/library, a recreation building and kitchen, dining, bathing and laundry facilities.

The alternatives to Government-run institutions were benevolent institutions and homes for the aged run by charities and religious organisations. Early examples were often housed within converted residences, such as at Hanworth Home for the Aged, established in 1913. A new type of charitable institution, similar to the Charters Towers "Eventide", was established in 1936 in the Brisbane suburb of Chermside, due to the combined efforts of Methodist social advocate Reverend Harold Wheller and philanthropist/businessman George Marchant. Chermside Garden Settlement consisted of 20 cottages in a garden setting, with communal dining room and laundry buildings, and grew rapidly to include a chapel, bowling green and a further nine cottages within four years.

Despite the growing number of facilities available, in the mid-20th century there were still not enough places to accommodate all pensioners in need, and the regulated lifestyle offered by institutions did not appeal to able-bodied pensioners who wished to live independently. To encourage the construction of more affordable housing for pensioners, in 1945 the Queensland Department of Health and Home Affairs implemented a state-wide scheme to assist local authorities with constructing cottages. The scheme offered a pound-for-pound subsidy and, where necessary, made loan money available. The cottages were intended for pensioners who were able to care for themselves and desired to live independently in their local districts. The grant of the subsidy was subject to approval by Cabinet, and it was the responsibility of the local authority to secure the site, prepare plans and erect and maintain the cottages.

By September 1953, cottages had been built at Innisfail (11 units), Cloncurry (6 cottages), Inglewood (1 cottage), Texas (1 cottage), Warwick (8 cottages), Toowoomba (22 units), Mareeba (10 cottages), Ipswich (12 units), and Mackay (12 cottages under construction). Other towns known to have carried cottage schemes through to completion include Maryborough, Atherton, Bowen and Blackall. The types of accommodation constructed varied. In Toowoomba, eleven timber United States Army buildings were relocated to West Street and converted into duplex cottages, each housing two couples. This was one of the first schemes completed, with units available from December 1947. In Innisfail, fibro-clad single and double units, and one four-unit cottage for women only, were built in different locations in the town so that the pensioners would be "part of the normal fellowship of suburban life". In Mackay, a "model settlement" of 12 cottages and a communal laundry was designed by architect Karl Langer, built in a low, bungalow style serviced by a winding road. In Cloncurry, six rectangular, concrete and brick cottages were constructed in a row on the edge of town. While in Brassall, Ipswich, six double units, with tiled roofs and brick chimneys, were completed in 1953, each unit containing a bedroom, living room, kitchen, bathroom and verandah. Cottages were let for an affordable rent, and pensioners interested in occupying them made an application to the local authority. Some schemes only permitted all males or all females to reside there, while others provided for mixed groups and married couples.

Not all proposed cottages schemes went ahead as planned and local authorities had different views about the concept. In Barcaldine, a scheme to build 6 cottages did not progress due to building costs and the unwillingness of local pensioners to pay rent for them. The Bowen Town Council was forced to defer building their "model village" for years due to delays in obtaining approvals and rapidly rising construction costs, with only three out of six planned cottages eventually built in c. 1954. The Townsville City Council stated their opinion that homes for the aged were a better system than pensioners' cottages, and that the Australian Government's Social Service Fund were the proper authority to fulfil the obligation to house pensioners.

In Cairns, lobbying on behalf of local pensioners began in 1947, when a branch of the Australian Pensioners' League (APL) was formed in July. The League played an important role in improving the living conditions of Queensland pensioners by lobbying local, state and federal governments on issues such as raising the minimum pension rate, abolishing the means test, and improving social benefits. One of the first acts of the Cairns branch of the APL was to request that Cairns City Council have the Martyn Street reserve officially gazetted as a Reserve for Pensioners' Homes, which took place on 4 September 1948. The reserve, of approximately 2.9 hectares (7.2 acres), was bounded by Grove Street to the southeast, Lily Creek to the northeast, Charles Street to the northwest, and private properties to the southwest.

The following year, in December 1949, a deputation of the Cairns branches of the APL and the Australian Labor Party requested that Cairns City Council erect cottages for single and married pensioners on the reserve that could be let for a nominal rental. In arguing their case, the deputation pointed out the poor living conditions of the pensioners currently occupying the reserve, and stood up for the rights of Cairns pensioners to stay residing in the area, rather than relocating to a state-run institution in another region. In response, the Mayor of Cairns stated that council had already begun investigating costs and would consider the matter when more information was available.

Progress towards constructing the cottages was slow. In mid-1950 a deputation of the Cairns Pensioners' League approached the Member of the Queensland Legislative Assembly for Cook, Carlisle Wordsworth, who wrote to the Cairns City Council urging them to take action, saying: "These elderly people are living under conditions unworthy of a city the size of Cairns. They are not seeking charity but feel entitled to the provision of huts and lighting on a rental basis. Such facilities have been provided for pensioners at Mareeba." The Mayor, William Henry Murchison, replied that an amount for a cottage scheme had been placed on the council's loan budget, and in December 1950 the council passed a resolution to borrow £1500 for erecting six cottages.

Approval for this loan and the £1500 state government subsidy was granted in February 1951, and the Mayor announced that tenders for erecting the cottages would be called shortly. Plans were prepared and submitted to the Department of Public Works for approval. However, the Department's objections to aspects of the cottage design delayed progress for over a year. A frustrated Cairns Mayor, Bill Fulton, defended the cottage plans, explaining that the designs were based on those of the Anderson Street diggers' homes, which had been found very satisfactory.

The diggers' homes scheme that provided a basis for the pensioners' cottage designs was undertaken by the Cairns and District branch of the Returned Sailors' and Soldiers' Imperial League of Australia (RSSILA) in 1937. Built to house "burnt-out" former soldiers, the scheme comprised six small timber cottages, fully furnished with electricity, water and space for gardens, erected in a row off Anderson Street. The site also included a community hall and a communal bathroom. The scheme was funded by public donations and the land was donated by the Mayor, William Aloysius Collins.

The Mareeba pensioners' cottages scheme referred to by Wordsworth had been constructed in 1950. Consisting of ten cottages in a row (two for married couples, eight for single occupants) the Mareeba scheme was held up by advocates of the proposed Cairns scheme as a good model to follow. Neither the diggers' homes nor the Mareeba cottages survive today.

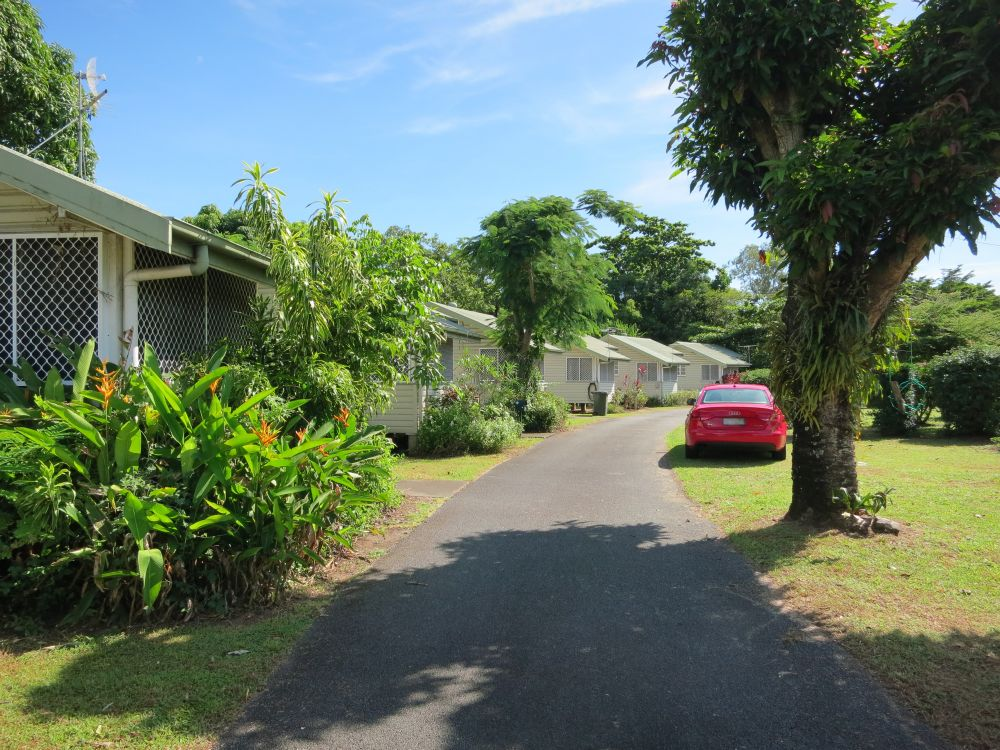
View northwest along the driveway, 2017

In early 1953, after resolving the various design and loan issues with the Queensland Government, Cairns City Council commenced work on the Grove Street cottages. The approved plans and specifications, dated October 1952, were for small, individual cottages containing two rooms – a kitchen and bedroom – each 10 by 8 feet (3.0 by 2.4 m), as well as a stove recess and an 8-by-5-foot (2.4 by 1.5 m) front verandah. They were to be timber-framed, clad in chamferboards with a gable roof clad in corrugated asbestos cement sheeting. Standing on low concrete stumps, access was to be via front and rear timber stairs. Internally, floors were to be of hardwood, walls and partitions lined with plywood, and the ceilings and stove recesses lined with fibrous cement sheeting. Joinery consisted of framed, ledged and braced timber doors, timber casement windows with "obscured fancy glass", and glass louvres to the stove recesses. The cottages were to be laid out in a crescent formation, with plenty of space for gardens at the front and rear. Two earth closets and a laundry/shower block were to be located behind the cottages.

The site for the cottages was facing Grove Street at the southern end of the pensioners' reserve, away from the existing pensioners' huts. Construction of the cottages took place in stages, with the first cottage (the centre cottage today), one laundry block and one earth closet completed by November 1953. In April 1954, a contract to construct four cottages (two each on either side of the existing cottage) and one earth closet was signed by contractor L Davey and the work was likely undertaken in late 1954. In September 1954, Cairns City Council announced its intention to borrow an additional £500 to defray the cost of erecting the pensioners' cottages.

Aerial photographs show the remaining three cottages (one at either end of the crescent and one set behind at the southwest end) and laundry building at Grove Street were built after May 1957, concurrent with a second pensioners' cottages scheme being constructed in Cairns for women and married couples, located in Pease Street. The Pease Street site was first investigated by council in early 1954, and construction of the first stage of pensioners' cottages commenced there in late 1956. Cairns City Council meeting minute books from 1955 to 1958 refer to applications for additional loans (with matching subsidies from the state government) and the use of day labour to erect pensioner cottages, but there is no distinction made between the two sites. The Grove Street site was likely completed in 1958, comprising a total of eight cottages, seven of which were arranged in a crescent and linked by a curved driveway, two laundry buildings, and two earth closets. The Pease Street site grew to comprise 15 cottages, arranged in two straight rows, and an unknown number of outbuildings.

As the first pensioners' cottages to be built in Cairns, the Grove Street cottages set the pattern for further pensioner housing to be built in the region. The cottages constructed in Pease Street followed the same plan, with a larger version for married couples. In 1954, Mulgrave Shire Council invited tenders for a single pensioners' cottage each at Yorkeys Knob, Gordonvale, Babinda and Bramston Beach, with the design to be similar to those being erected in Cairns. Mulgrave Shire Council went on to tender for construction of cottages at Machans Beach and Edmonton in 1957. None of the Mulgrave Shire cottages survive today.

Accommodation at the Grove Street Reserve was increased substantially during the 1970s and 80s, when the remainder of the reserve land between Grove and Charles streets was subdivided and developed in stages by the Queensland Housing Commission. These developments took the form of long blocks of single storey units in a garden setting.

The gardens surrounding the Grove Street pensioners' cottages varied in use and layout over the decades, and by the 1970s included clusters of large trees at the western end of the site. In 1989 Cairns City Council added a plaque to the front gardens in line with cottage 4 (the centre cottage), dedicated to former resident Keron Glendon, who "established this garden and caringly tended it for 14 years". In 2017, surviving trees and shrubs from Glendon's garden remain near the plaque.

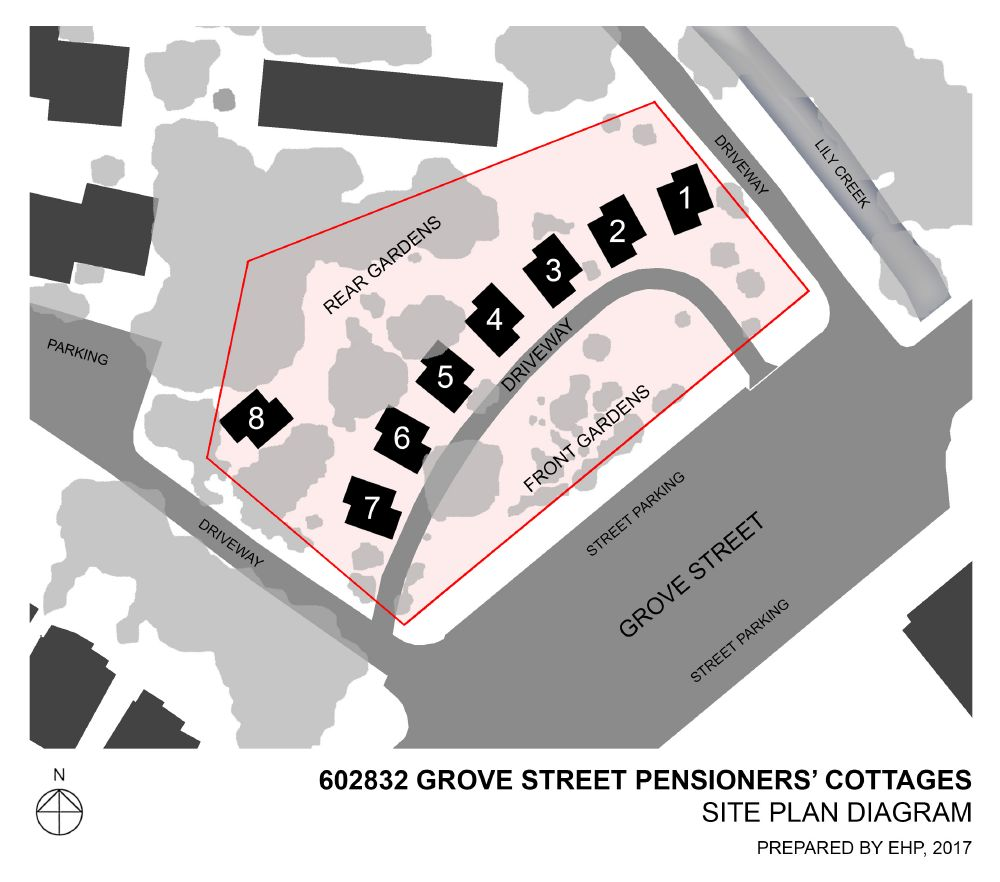
Site plan for the cottages

Of the many pensioners' cottages schemes built in Queensland in the 1940s and 50s, most have been demolished or replaced by more modern accommodation. Known surviving schemes include: Toowoomba (9 out of 11 duplex cottages), Brassall, Ipswich (original 6 duplex units), Blackall (original 4 cottages), Warwick (original 4 single and 2 duplex cottages), Atherton (original 2 cottages), Pease Street, Cairns (7 out of 15 cottages - 3 single cottages, 4 married couples' cottages, some relocated on site) and Grove Street, Cairns (original 8 single cottages).

The Grove Street cottages remain in their original layout surrounded by gardens and mature trees, and have undergone some alterations and additions over the decades. In the 1980s a bathroom extension was added to the rear of the bedroom of each cottage, and the front verandahs were enclosed. The laundry/shower blocks were subsequently used for storage, and have recently been demolished. All cottages had their roof sheeting replaced by 1990 and the exterior walls have been covered with vinyl panels replicating timber boards. Other additions include roof ventilators and security screens. In 2017, most of the Grove Street Pensioners' Cottages continue to be occupied by elderly pensioners and the site remains under the trusteeship of Cairns Regional Council.

The heritage listing in August 2017 was controversial as the Cairns Regional Council had proposed to redevelop the site with 20 to 30 modern affordable dwellings with better mobility access. Following the nomination for heritage listing, the council suggested that two of the cottages should be relocated and refurbished for the purposes of heritage listing, arguing they had outlived their usefulness as public housing. Critics of the 1950s cottages described them as "asbestos ridden" "huts" and did not think they were worthy of heritage listing as "they're pretty bloody ordinary". However, the final decision was to list all 8 of the cottages in situ.

== Description ==
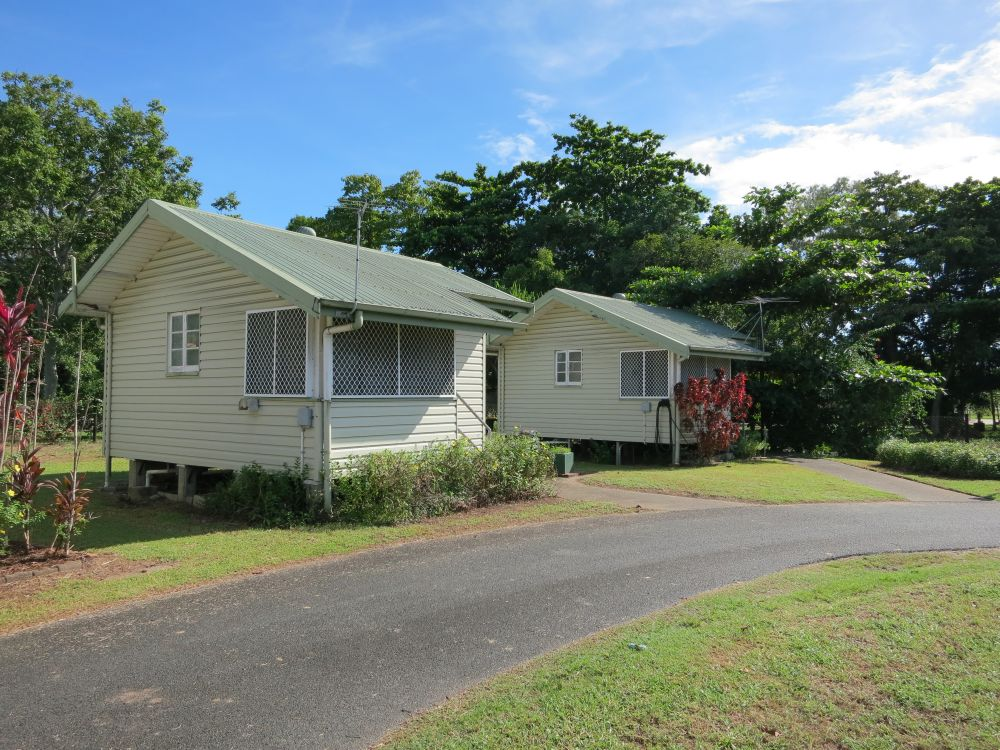
Front view of cottages 1 and 2, 2017

The Grove Street Pensioners' Cottages occupy a southeast-facing 0.33-hectare (0.82-acre) site on Grove Street in the Cairns suburb of Parramatta Park. Seven individual cottages are arranged in a crescent addressing Grove Street, linked by a curved driveway, while an eighth cottage stands alone in the western corner of the site. Residential development surrounds the site to the southwest and northwest, largely screened from view by trees, and Lily Creek lies to the northeast. Driveways accessing properties to the rear of the site adjoin the northeast and southwest boundaries.

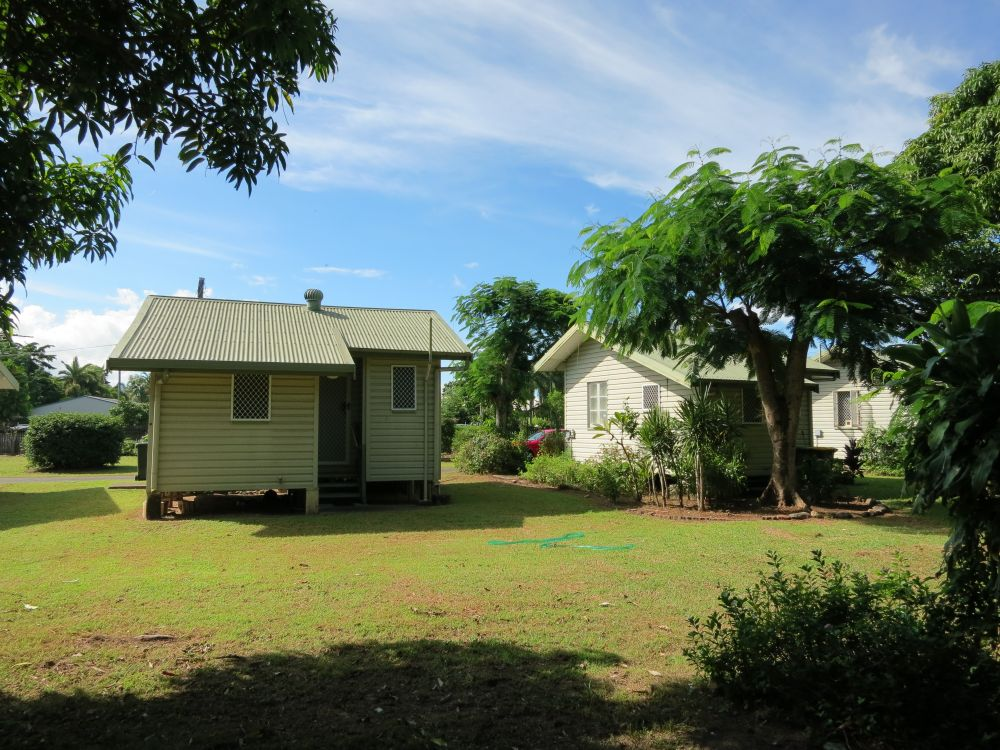
Rear view of cottages 4 and 5, 2017

From the exterior, the cottages appear almost identical. Small in scale, they are single storey, timber-framed buildings on low concrete stumps. Each has a gable roof clad in corrugated metal sheeting with raked eaves. The walls and eaves are clad in pre-painted vinyl panels replicating timber boards. Original windows are timber-framed, three-light casements of patterned glass, and louvres to the stove recess. The front verandahs have been enclosed with louvres above balustrade height. A short flight of steps to the front door has a modern metal handrail, while the rear steps retain their timber balustrade. Non-significant elements of the exterior include: louvre windows to the verandah enclosure and rear bathroom addition, roof ventilators, security screens to doors and windows, vinyl cladding, and metal handrails.

The interior of each cottage contains four rooms – an enclosed front verandah, a kitchen with original stove recess, a bedroom, and a bathroom extension. All have been renovated at different times and contain a variety of linings, fittings and fixtures. Surviving early fabric includes: framed and ledged timber board doors, early locks and door handles, kitchen cabinets, chamfered architraves, and flat wall and ceiling linings with cover strips. Non-significant elements of the interior include: ceiling fans and lights, bathroom fit-outs, and modern shelving and cabinets.

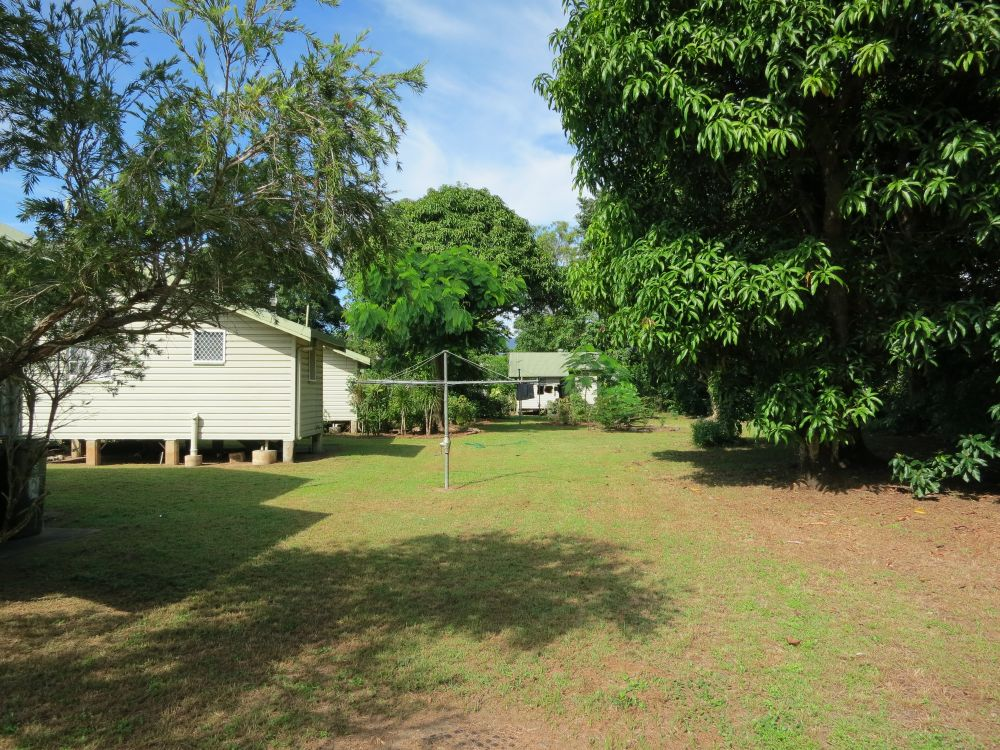
Rear gardens, 2017

The cottages are surrounded by lawns and garden beds with mature trees (including mango trees) lining the rear boundary. Garden beds adjacent to each cottage vary in layout and extent, and the site contains a wide variety of tree and plant species. The western end of the site is characterised by dense clusters of vegetation and mature trees, including a large fig tree to the north of Cottage 8. In the centre of the front gardens are trees and shrubs remaining from an earlier garden layout and a 1989 plaque laid by Cairns City Council in appreciation of the work of KP (King) Glendon in establishing and tending the garden for 14 years.

A curved bitumen driveway links the cottages along their south-eastern side, following the path of an earlier unsealed driveway. Fencing enclosing the site is not of heritage significance.

The identical cottages in their curved layout and garden setting are an attractive feature of the Grove Street streetscape.

== Heritage listing ==
Grove Street Pensioners' Cottages was listed on the Queensland Heritage Register on 24 August 2017 having satisfied the following criteria.

The place is important in demonstrating the evolution or pattern of Queensland's history.

The Grove Street Pensioners' Cottages, constructed from 1953 to c. 1958, are important in demonstrating the widespread movement to provide affordable housing for old aged pensioners in the 1940s-50s in Queensland. Pensioners' Cottages schemes, which were built by local authorities with the aid of a State Government subsidy offered from 1945, were an important social welfare initiative that allowed pensioners to lead independent lives in their local districts, and were an alternative to aged care homes and institutions.

The Grove Street cottages were the first of their type to be built in Cairns and are important surviving evidence of a largely intact pensioners' cottages scheme.

The place is important in demonstrating the principal characteristics of a particular class of cultural places.

The Grove Street Pensioners' Cottages are an excellent and largely intact example of a pensioners' cottage scheme, and are important in demonstrating the principal characteristics of this type of affordable, independent accommodation constructed for aged pensioners in the 1940s and 50s. This class of place comprises multiple, small, single or duplex residences of few rooms, of similar or identical appearance and with a simple plan form, arranged on a single site with open space for gardens, and often including communal laundry and/or bathroom facilities.

The Grove Street site retains its original layout of eight single cottages in a spacious garden setting, connected by a curved driveway. The cottages retain their identical external appearance, original form and plan layout, and most original joinery and materials, with some alterations and additions over time.
