= St Mark's Anglican Church and Dunwich Public Hall =

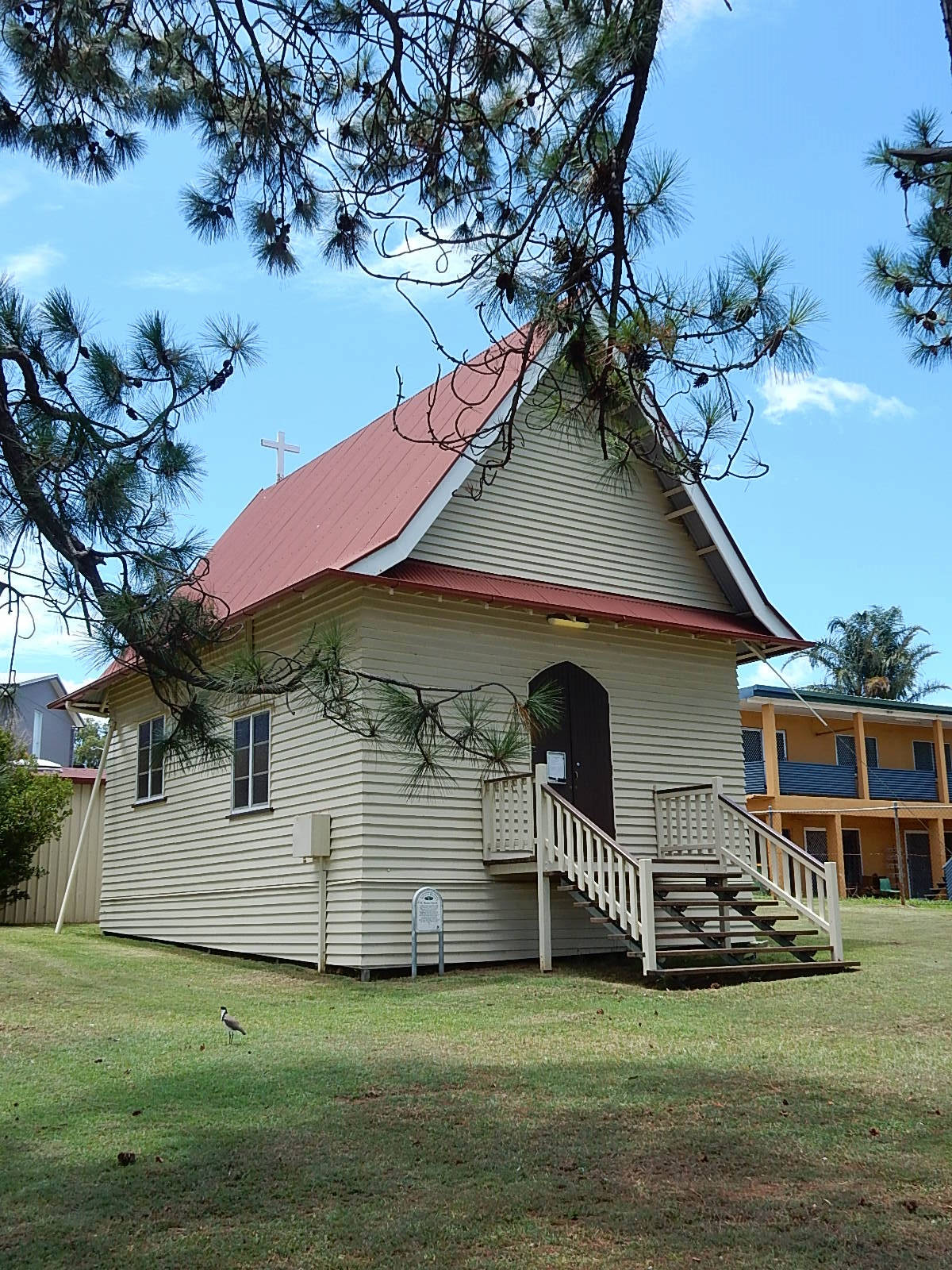
- St Mark's Anglican Church

- Location within Queensland Location within Australia
- 27.5005°S 153.4037°E
- Location: Junner Street, Dunwich, North Stradbroke Island, City of Redland, Queensland, Australia

History
- Design period: 1900–1914 (early 20th century)
- Built: 1907–c. 1913

Queensland Heritage Register
- Official name: St Mark's Anglican Church and Dunwich Public Hall, Benevolent Asylum Mess Hall
- Type: state heritage (built, landscape)
- Designated: 28 July 2000
- Reference no.: 601163
- Significant period: 1900s–1940s (historical); 1900s (fabric church); 1910s (fabric hall) ongoing (social)
- Significant components: views to, hall, furniture/fittings, views from, church, memorial – plaque

St Mark's Anglican Church and Dunwich Public Hall are a heritage-listed church and public hall at Junner Street, Dunwich, North Stradbroke Island in the City of Redland, Queensland, Australia. The church was built in 1907 and the hall c. 1913 as part of the Dunwich Benevolent Asylum. The Dunwich Public Hall is also known as Benevolent Asylum Mess Hall. They were added to the Queensland Heritage Register on 28 July 2000.

== History ==
The Benevolent Asylum St Mark's Anglican Church (1907) and the Dunwich Public Hall (1913) were once integral structures of the Dunwich Benevolent Asylum located at Dunwich from 1864 to 1947. The institution was declared a home for the old and infirm, disabled, inebriates and for a short time lepers. Previously the site had been used as an out-station during the penal settlement of Brisbane (1827–1831), a Catholic mission to local Aborigines (1843–1847) and a Quarantine Station (1850–1864).

The Benevolent Asylum may be likened to the English poorhouses which were established to house and feed those members of the community who were unable to provide for themselves. Under 19th century legislation these poorhouses developed into the stricter regime of the workhouse. Conditions within these workhouses was generally appalling with inmates often being reduced to starvation levels, families separated and inmates forced to perform boring and demeaning work tasks.

The Australian version of the workhouse was the Benevolent Asylum; however it was not a place of committal and was generally considered by the authorities and advocates to be of better social standing. Generally, governments of the period, including the Queensland Government, were loath to recognise the existence of a vagrant class. In the 19th century class structure, poverty was seen as the fault of the individual and governments avoided providing relief to these groups for fear they would establish a level of government reliance. Instead, aid was provided to various charity groups, such as benevolent societies. The government subscribed to a view that this aid should be in the form of kind rather than cash which undermined self-reliance and initiative.

The desperate decline of some community groups saw the government eventually forced to subsidise some charity organisations. Unwillingly, they also assumed responsibility for the aged and infirmed who were unable to care for themselves and had no relatives or friends who could support them.

In 1844 the Moreton Bay Benevolent Society formed as a charity administered by citizens. The society was given responsibility for the Brisbane hospital in 1858 as part of the New South Wales government hand over of hospitals to local committees. In 1861 the Queensland Government passed the Benevolent Asylum Act awarding funds to Queensland Hospitals to set wards aside as Benevolent Asylums.

Whilst the integration of the asylum into the hospital structure may have alleviated some of the pressure for the Queensland government, over expenditure and crowding stretched hospital facilities to their limit, resulting in requests from the Hospital Committee for the asylum to be removed. In 1863 the hospital committee resolved that the hospital and asylum should be separate institutions. It was suggested this new facility could be a combined benevolent asylum and orphanage. The new building would initially house men until funds became available for further extensions when women and children could also be relocated from the hospital.

In 1864 the government proposed relocating the hospital to Bowen Bridge Road. The hospital committee considered this move a prime opportunity to officially separate the institutions. Following a visit to the asylum, Colonial Secretary Robert Herbert agreed with the suggestion, but on reflection, considered a separate building constructed on the hospital site could be used to house the asylum. The hospital committee disagreed and objected to the proposal resulting in Herbert arranging for the benevolent asylum to be housed by the immigration department.

In 1865, under the control of the Immigration Department, the benevolent asylum was transferred to the old quarantine station at Dunwich, North Stradbroke. The government considered this a temporary relocation; however, the asylum remained at Dunwich until its closure in 1947. Following years of debate between the hospital and Queensland Government concerning the responsibility of the asylum, the Colonial Secretary assumed complete control of the facility in 1867 and established an administration which lasted until 1947. However, the government considered asylum inmates responsible for their own condition and as such the asylum was low on the government priority list and funds were administered begrudgingly.

Dunwich became a repository for the male and female pauper population of Queensland including the old and infirm, the sick and disabled and the orphaned. The incredible mix of people meant the facility was overcrowded and difficult to manage. Coupled with poor funding and unqualified staff, asylum conditions were often appalling. During the depression years the asylum was in heavy demand for the unemployed and elderly who could no longer be cared for by their families. The asylum was now populated with able bodied people, and the administration developed a plan to create in-house work which would help support the facility. This prompted the Brisbane Courier at the time to pose the question "asylum or workhouse?".

A site plan from 1913 illustrates the development of the expanding benevolent asylum at the time of its peak. The development quite obviously expanded the original quarantine station layout and was established on the high ground in a "u" shape around a lower lying open community space (now the public reserve) which fronted the beach. The asylum at this point included a police station and lock up, visitor centre, public hall, ancillary service buildings, ward buildings, tent accommodation and recreational facilities. Early structures were constructed of timber however later buildings such as the bakery, kitchen, laundry and men's mess hall were constructed of brick.

In 1947 the institution was officially closed as a result of overcrowding and deteriorating health conditions. Over its eighty years the asylum admitted and readmitted 21,000 people. The institution was then transferred to the old RAAF Station Sandgate at Sandgate, and renamed "Eventide". Dunwich was then opened up to government land sales and mining of mineral sand resources. Ward buildings were sold and either relocated on site or to the mainland. More substantial brick structures were demolished. The parcel of land which once formed the community space was gazetted by the government in 1949 as a public reserve and since that time has stood as the community green space of the Dunwich Township.

The development of North Stradbroke island as a popular holiday retreat and rich mineral sand mining resource has meant the barge landing facilities and surrounding area at Dunwich have undergone continual change since 1947. Despite the substantial development of Dunwich, the remnant structure of the benevolent asylum is still echoed in the current town layout.

=== St Mark's Church ===
Initially church services at the asylum were held in Victoria Hall, the main assembly facility within the complex. This was rectified in 1907 when St Mark's church was constructed at the asylum. While the church was built for the Benevolent Asylum residents, it was not commissioned by the Queensland Government. The money to fund the church construction is reported to have been privately donated. The annual report to the Queensland Parliament for the Dunwich Benevolent Asylum for the year ending 1907 noted that, owing to the munificence of an anonymous donor, who takes a great personal interest in the poor, a small church is to be erected. The Church of England authorised the construction and part of the asylum site was leased from the government by the church.

Lady Chelmsford, the wife of the Governor of Queensland at the time is reported to have donated the money for the construction of the church. In an address to the Queensland Women's Historical Association, Bonty Dickson, a long time resident of the island claimed that when Lady Chelmsford visited the Benevolent Asylum she was shocked and amazed to find that the inmates had no place of worship and so gave the money to build a church at Dunwich.

The church was designed by the Diocesan Architect for the Church of England, Robin Dods. His tender books for October 1907 record the tender for the construction of the church being awarded to the builders Hall and Meyer for the sum of 273 pounds. Dods was an exceptionally talented and original architect, introducing to Queensland the "formal and philosophical ideas of both the British Arts and Crafts movement and Edwardian classicism." At the same time, he refined and re-worked common elements of traditional Queensland houses and methods of construction and his houses exhibited a common-sense and often innovative approach to designing for the sub-tropical climate. Dods produced an impressive and high quality body of work in Queensland including hospital, commercial and ecclesiastical buildings as well as many residences.

The first chaplain of the church was Reverend W Richner who was appointed in an honorary capacity, representing the City and Dunwich and St Helena Mission. After the Benevolent asylum closed the church continued to be used by local residents. In 1973 the building was condemned by the Redland Shire Council as it was considered structurally unsound. However the Stradbroke residents united to raise funds to carry out emergency repair works and save the church from demolition. In 1977 the Archbishop of Brisbane the Reverend Dr F. R. Arnott held a service of thanks at St Mark's to celebrate the event. Since that time a series of conservation works have been carried out on the church .

In 2015, the church is within the Anglican parish of Stradbroke Island and services are held at the church on the 2nd and 4th Sunday of each month.

=== Dunwich Public Hall ===
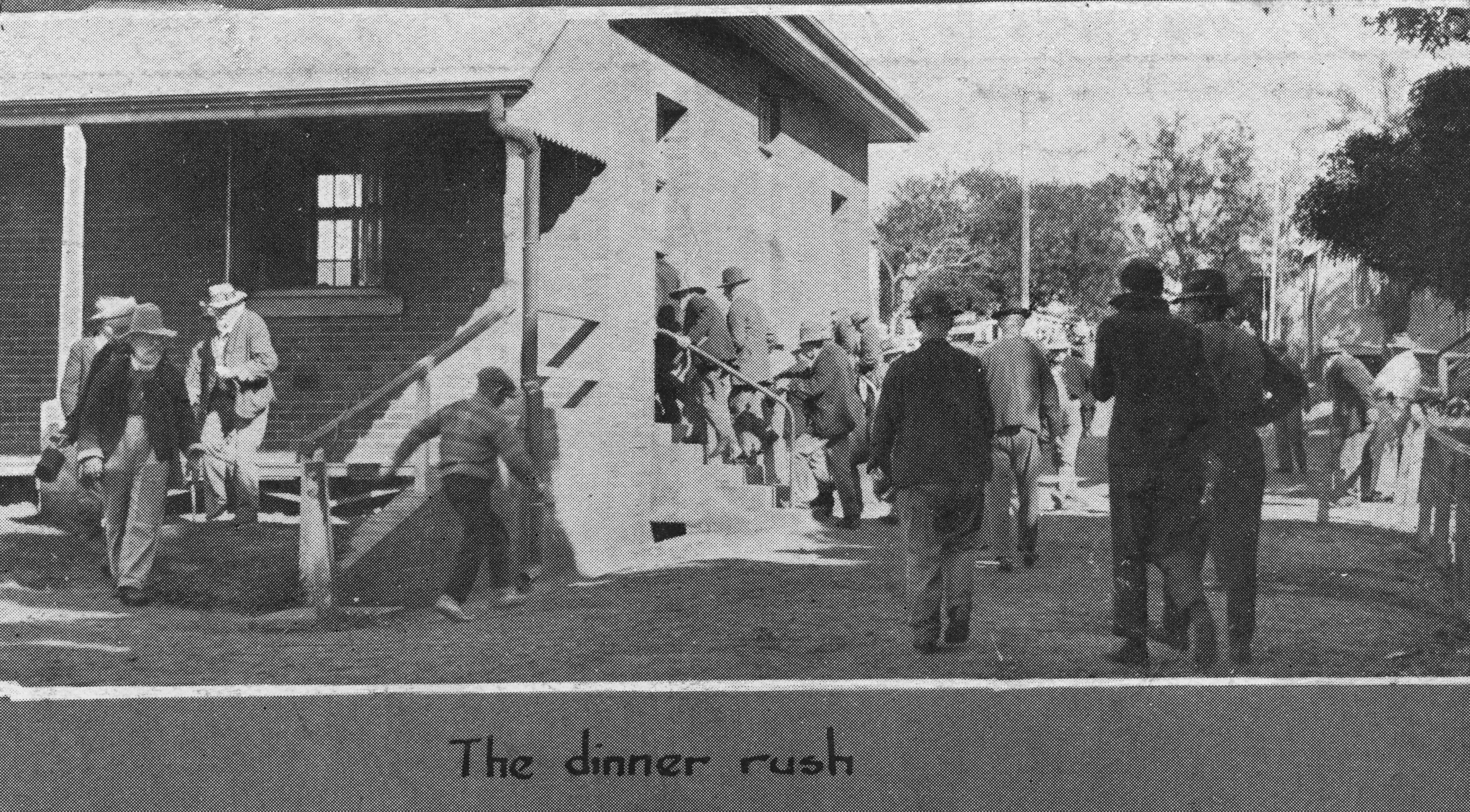
Patients entering the dining hall at the Dunwich Benevolent Asylum Queensland, 1932

Dunwich Public Hall, located at the corner of Junner Street and Ballow Road, Dunwich, North Stradbroke Island, was constructed in 1913. Formerly the men's mess hall at the Benevolent Asylum, the building was ordered and funded by the Queensland government. Department of Public Works Tender records confirm that tenders for the proposed works were received at the Department of Public works on Friday 7 March 1913. The contractor selected to carry out the works is noted as Graham and Speering.

The mess hall was located centrally within the asylum along with the kitchen, laundry and stores. Goods received from the mainland were transported to the mess hall and other buildings by a horse-drawn tram system. This tram system was also used to transport food in huge pannikins from the kitchen, located approximately 200 yards away, to the mess hall. Consequently, food was often served cold which was a point of much debate amongst the inmates.

The hall seated 400 single men and had provision for a servery and scullery at one end. The walls were partially lined with tiles for hygiene purposes and the clerestorey windows and large side windows ventilated the large room and flooded the space with natural light. Head attendants were said to supervise the meals which were served by inmate labour. After 1913 the building was extended to include a boiler room which provided hot water to the kitchen wash up troughs. It is reported that during WWII the floor of the hall was removed and an air raid shelter dug into the floor.

Most of the buildings associated with the asylum were relocated or demolished with the closure of the facility in 1947. The mess hall however survived this period and has since been used as the Dunwich Public Hall. During that period the building has remained remarkably intact with the only significant building additions being the enclosure of part of the verandah to accommodate toilets and the construction of an interior stage. Most recently the earlier verandah enclosure was removed and new toilet facilities established in a separate building connected to the hall by way of a timber battened breezeway.

As of 2015, the Dunwich Public Hall is managed by the Redland City Council.

== Description ==
=== St Mark's Church ===
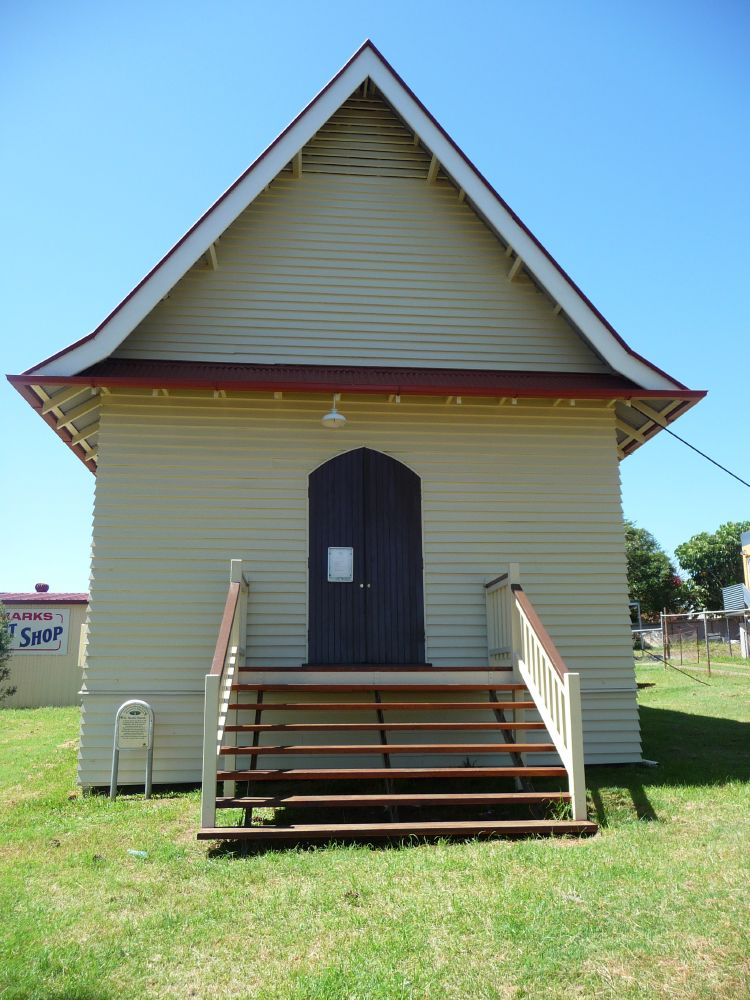
St Mark's Anglican Church, 2009

St Mark's Church is located at the corner Rous Street and Ballow Road, Dunwich, North Stradbroke Island on a parcel of land that falls toward Ballow Road. The building is set back from the street frontages and a line of pine trees follows the street edge. A significant view across Moreton Bay and on to Brisbane is obtained from the front of the church looking toward Ballow Road.

The church is elevated above ground level and is constructed of timber with a steeply pitched corrugated metal roof. The roof pitch flattens slightly at the eaves creating a semi bell cast profile. Externally the building is clad with timber weatherboards which extend below the floor level to create a solid skirt to the building. At the corner junctions, the boards are mitred and at the gable ends the weatherboards are slightly separated to create a vent to the roof space. Both the roof and weather board details are typical of Dod's work.

A recent addition to the church are the steel tie rods to the south eastern side of the building. These rods are integrated into the existing timber tie beams of the building and were installed to stabilise the structural failings of the structure. The tie rods are anchored back to substantial concrete footings which are raised above ground level. A timber cross brace has also been installed on the rear north east wall to further stabilise the structure.

Entry to the church is from the Ballow Road frontage by a more recent timber stair with steel handrails. The paired entry doors to the church have an arched head and are timber framed and clad with tongue and groove boards. Windows to the church are three panel timber framed casements with coloured glass infills.

Internally the church is a single volume space with a small vestry formed in the southern corner by low height partitions. The ceiling follows the line of the rafters giving greater height to the internal space which is punctuated by two large tie beams. Both the walls and ceilings are lined with timber tongue and groove boarding. A series of generous steps lead to the altar. The timber floors are carpeted in the nave and polished at the steps with a central carpet runner leading to the altar. The interior space is embellished with decorative timber mouldings to the cornice and tie beams.

Furniture to the interior space includes the altar of varnished timber with inset quatrefoil panels, a timber framed fabric curtain screen to the altar, the altar rail and varnished pews. A painting by the late aboriginal poet and local Stradbroke resident Oodgeroo Noonuccal ( or Kath Walker) hangs on the southern wall near the altar.

Located at the rear of the site is a more recent building currently used as the thrift shop. This building is rectilinear in plan and is clad with cement sheeting with a simple metal butterfly roof.

=== Dunwich Public Hall ===
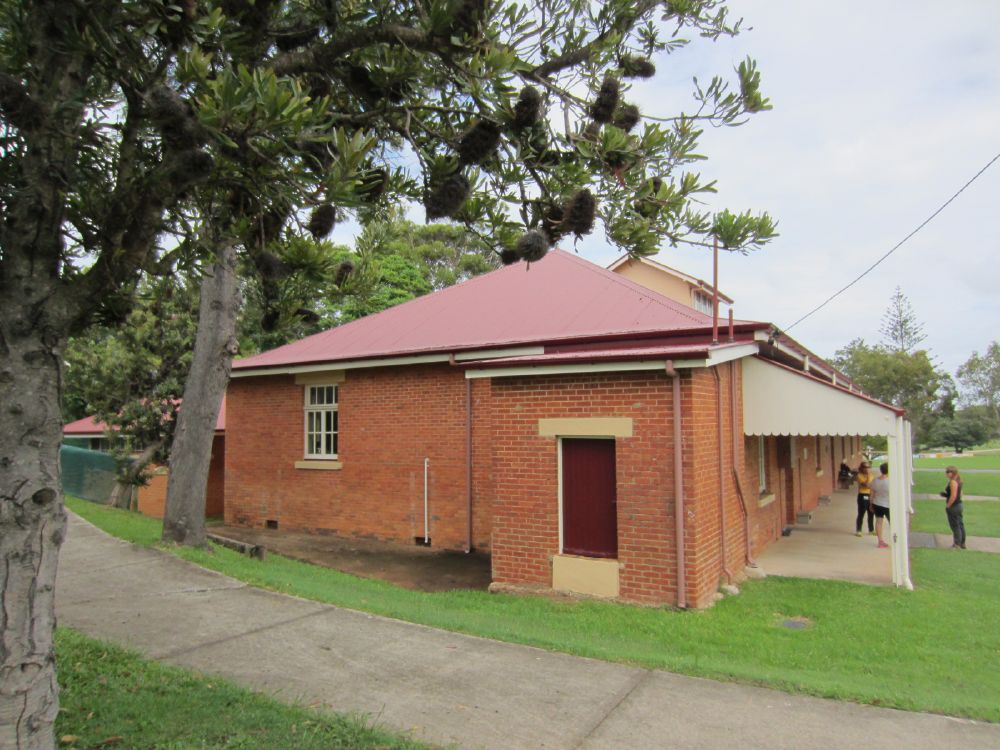
Dunwich Public Hall, 2015

Dunwich Public Hall located at the corner of Junner Street and Ballow Road, Dunwich, North Stradbroke Island. The site is generally an open grassed area with a small number of gum trees to the north east side of the building. Consequently, the building is a prominent feature on arrival at Dunwich.

The hall is a substantial low set stretcher bond brick structure which is rectilinear in plan with a simple corrugated iron hip roof. Set centrally on the hip roof is a gabled clerestorey roof comprising five windows on either side of the structure. A verandah extends the full length of the north east side of the building. Located on the south eastern end of the building is the boiler room extension which is constructed of brick to match the existing structure and has a simple skillion roof.

New toilet facilities have recently been constructed in a separate building to the south west side of the hall. This structure is joined to the hall by an enclosed timber battened breezeway. While the structure's form and material echo the details of the original hall, it is clearly distinguished as a new addition to the site.

Access to the hall is via timber framed French doors to the north western end of the building or from the southern end of the verandah. Six timber casement window suites with high level pivot fan lights punctuate the north eastern and south western elevations of the building. Doors and windows include simple paint finished rendered concrete heads and sills. Ventilation to the sub floor area and roof space is via metal and clay wall grilles and timber battened eaves soffits.

Internally the building is one large volume with the original servery and scullery at the south eastern end of the building and the new stage at the opposing end. Low height partitions separate the servery and scullery from the rest of the hall. The ceiling is clad with hardboard and timber cover battens and follows the line of the rafters exposing the primary timber trusses which are connected by way of steel plates. The focus of the hall is the central clerestorey which floods the space with natural light.

The floor is polished timber and the walls are a combination of tiles to the lower section and painted brickwork above. A collection of memorial plaques are located on the walls.

== Heritage listing ==
St Mark's Anglican Church and Dunwich Public Hall was listed on the Queensland Heritage Register on 28 July 2000 having satisfied the following criteria.

The place is important in demonstrating the evolution or pattern of Queensland's history.

St Mark's Anglican Church and the Dunwich Public Hall are important in demonstrating the evolution of Queensland's history, being surviving buildings of the former Benevolent Asylum.

The place demonstrates rare, uncommon or endangered aspects of Queensland's cultural heritage.

The places demonstrate rare aspects Queensland's cultural heritage being surviving intact examples of the type of buildings that were once part of the only nineteenth century Benevolent Asylum in Queensland.

The place has potential to yield information that will contribute to an understanding of Queensland's history.

The places demonstrate rare aspects Queensland's cultural heritage being surviving intact examples of the type of buildings that were once part of the only nineteenth century Benevolent Asylum in Queensland.

The place is important in demonstrating the principal characteristics of a particular class of cultural places.

The establishment and administration of the Benevolent Asylum illustrates the social policies adopted by the Queensland Government of the late Nineteenth and first early part of the Twentieth century to deal with those elderly, sick or disabled members of society who were unable to care for themselves.

The place is important because of its aesthetic significance.

The buildings are important for their aesthetic significance. St Mark's Anglican Church exhibits outstanding architectural quality and has significance as a surviving intact example of the ecclesiastical work of important Queensland architect Robert S.(Robin) Dods. Whilst modestly detailed, the Dunwich Public Hall is an evocative structure which is prominent on entry to Dunwich.

The place has a strong or special association with a particular community or cultural group for social, cultural or spiritual reasons.

As surviving remnants of the Benevolent Asylum both buildings hold have a strong social association with past inmates of the asylum and their families. Since the closure of the asylum in 1947, St Mark's Anglican Church has remained a place of worship and the former Men's Mess Hall has been used as the Dunwich Public Hall. Accordingly, both buildings have important social associations with the Anglican congregation of Dunwich and the broader Dunwich and North Stradbroke community.
