= Parramatta State School =

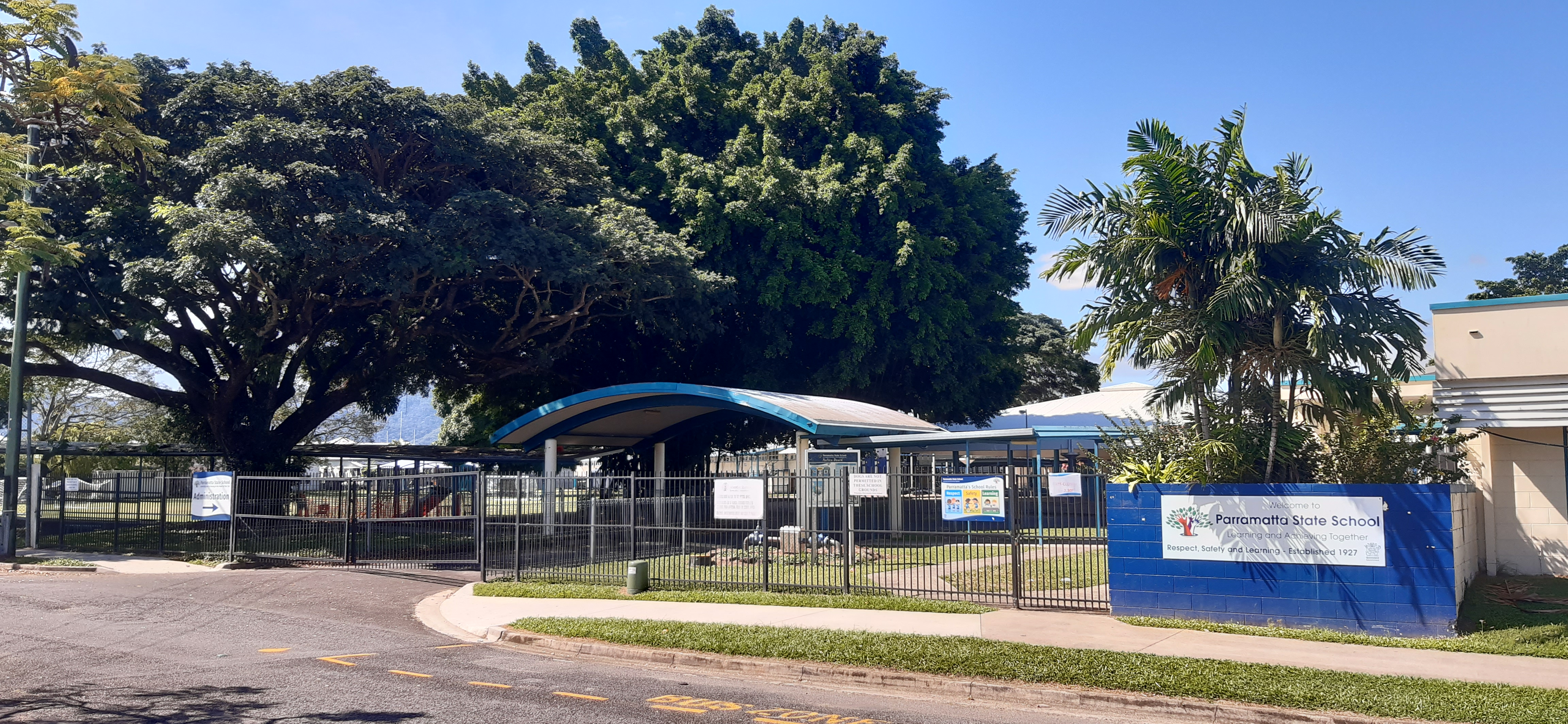
- The entrance to the school

Location
- Cairns, Queensland; Australia
- Coordinates: 16°55′30″S 145°45′46″E

Information
- Type: Public state primary
- Motto: Learning and achieving together
- Established: 1927
- Principal: Michael Patane
- Enrolment: 443 (2023)
- Campus: Parramatta Park
- Website: parramattass.eq.edu.au

Parramatta State School is a public co-educational primary school located in the Cairns suburb of Parramatta Park, Queensland, Australia. It is administered by the Department of Education, with an enrolment of 443 students and a teaching staff of 53, as of 2023. The school serves students from Prep to Year 6, and is one of the oldest schools within the Cairns region.

== Location ==
The school is located north of the Parramatta Park reserve, at 122 Mulgrave Road.

== History ==
In 1925, a state school within the region was being proposed. The land for the school was bought in March 1926 and the construction of the school began in May 1926, and was set to accommodate approximately 450 students. The cost was stated to be £10,878.

The foundation head teacher, Don Campell, was meant to make the arrangements for the school's opening the weekend prior, however, train delays caused this from happening. The Education Department wired the work on to Mr. E. Gordon (the head teacher of Cairns State School at the time) so the school could open the following Monday. The school opened on Monday, 24 January 1927, without a hitch, besides from the school grounds being not quite complete. Don Campell arrived in time to take over on the schools opening day.

By the end of 1930, the school had an enrolment of 581 students.

In 2015, the principal at the time, Wayne Kirk, was suspended from his role after using a Department of Education credit card for his own personal affairs.

== See also ==
- List of schools in Far North Queensland
