= Parramatta Park, Queensland =

Parramatta Park Cairns, Queensland
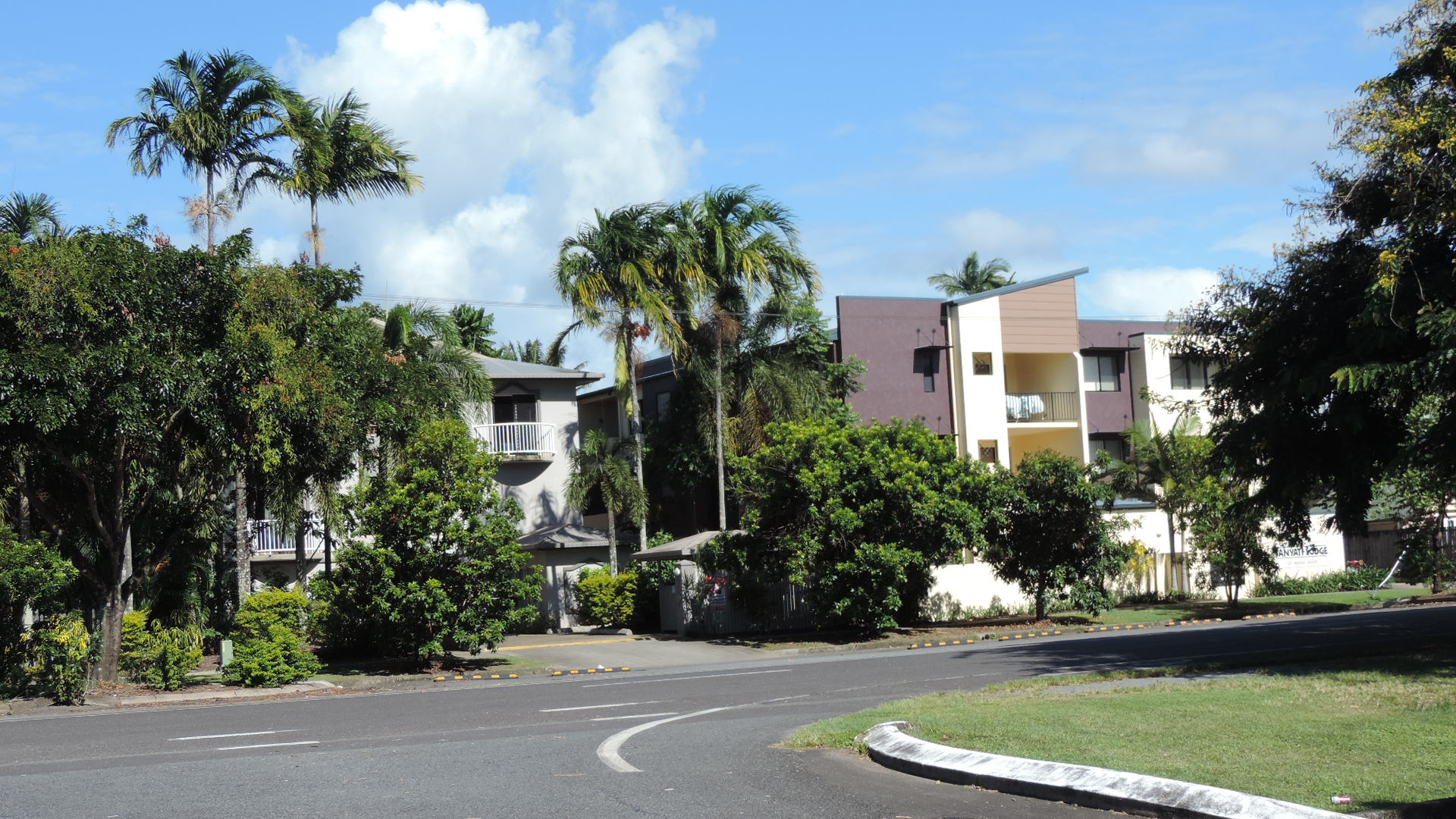
- Apartments in Minnie Street, 2018

- Coordinates: 16.9244°S 145.7625°E
- Population: 3,621 (2021 census)
  - Density: 2,260/km^{2} (5,860/sq mi)
- Postcode(s): 4870
- Area: 1.6 km^{2} (0.6 sq mi)
- Time zone: AEST (UTC+10:00)
- Location: 1 km (1 mi) SW of Cairns CBD; 346 km (215 mi) NNW of Townsville; 1,677 km (1,042 mi) NNW of Brisbane
- LGA(s): Cairns Region
- State electorate(s): Cairns
- Federal division(s): Leichhardt
Suburbs around Parramatta Park:
Manunda	Cairns North	Cairns City
Westcourt	Parramatta Park	Cairns City
Westcourt	Bungalow	Portsmith

Parramatta Park is a suburb of Cairns in the Cairns Region, Queensland, Australia. In the 2021 census, Parramatta Park had a population of 3,621 people.

== Geography ==
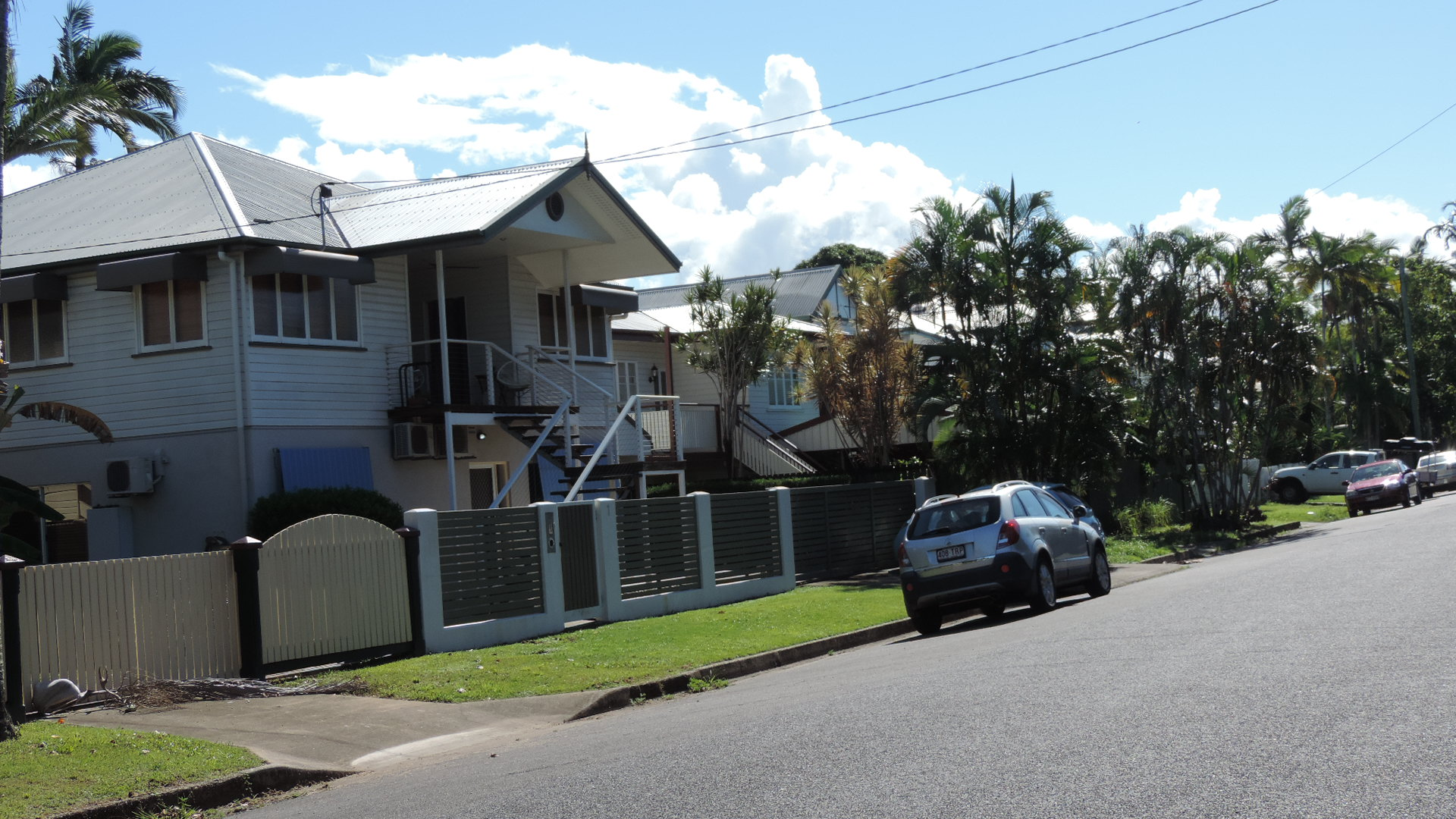
Houses in Archie Street, 2018

Parramatta Park is the suburb immediately west of Cairns City (the Cairns central business district). The northern part of the suburb is residential. The southern part of the suburb has a number of schools, the Cairns Showgrounds, Barlow Park (a multi-sports facility and stadium) and an industrial precinct.

== History ==
Parramatta Park is situated in the Yidinji traditional Aboriginal country.

The origin of the suburb name is from the suburb of Parramatta in the Sydney metropolitan area of New South Wales with a possible derivation from a hotel situated locally during the late nineteenth century.

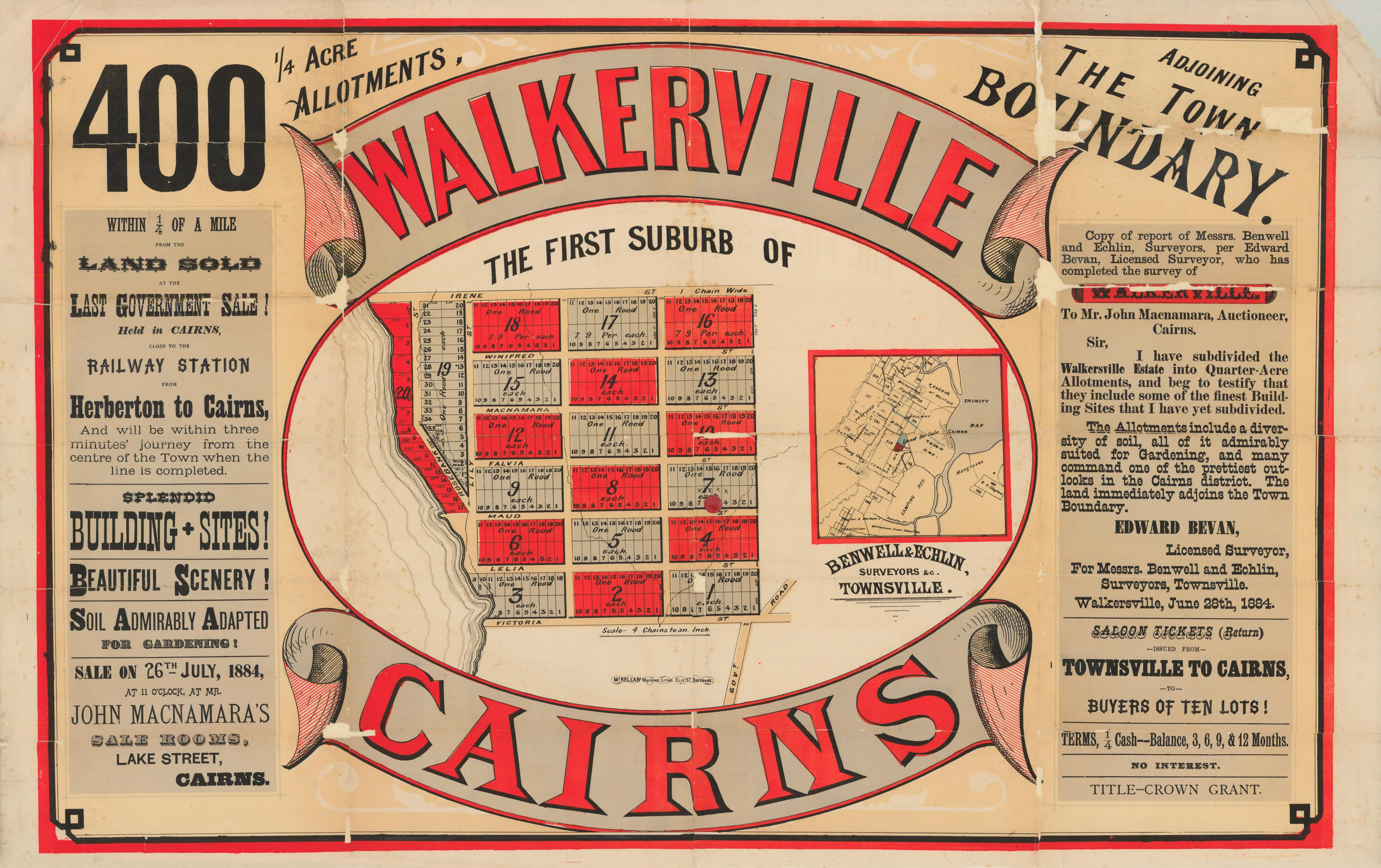
Real estate map of Walkerville (now Parramatta Park), the first suburb of Cairns, 1884

On 26 July 1884 auctioneer John McNamara offered the Walkerville Estate as the first suburb of Cairns, consisting of 400 lots, predominantly of 1 rood (11,000 sq ft; 1,000 m^{2}). The estate was promoted as being close to the terminus of the Herberton railway line and as a "paradise of health". To attract buyers from Townsville, there was the inducement of a free return trip to Cairns for buyers of 10 lots.

Parramatta State School was opened on 24 January 1927.

St Joseph's Primary School opened on 1 July 1927 by the Sisters of Mercy. Mercy Sisters were part of the teaching staff of the school until 2015. On Sunday 15 April 1928 Bishop John Heavey officially opened the new Catholic church and school building.

St Augustine's College opened on 9 February 1930 by the Marist Brothers.

On 17 June 1932, the Cairns City Council asked unemployed vagrants living in Parramatta Park, to leave the grounds for the duration of the Cairns show. They refused to go and by July 1932 the town's people were getting frantic and angry because they could not set up for the show. On 17 July 1932 police were called in to forcibly remove the men from the park, many towns people also took part in the hostilities and a riot broke out. A number of people were injured and the majority of the vagrants were "run out of town".

The Parramatta Park parish of the Roman Catholic Diocese of Cairns was established in 1946.

== Demographics ==
In the 2016 census, Parramatta Park had a population of 3,508 people.

In the 2021 census, Parramatta Park had a population of 3,621 people.

== Heritage listings ==
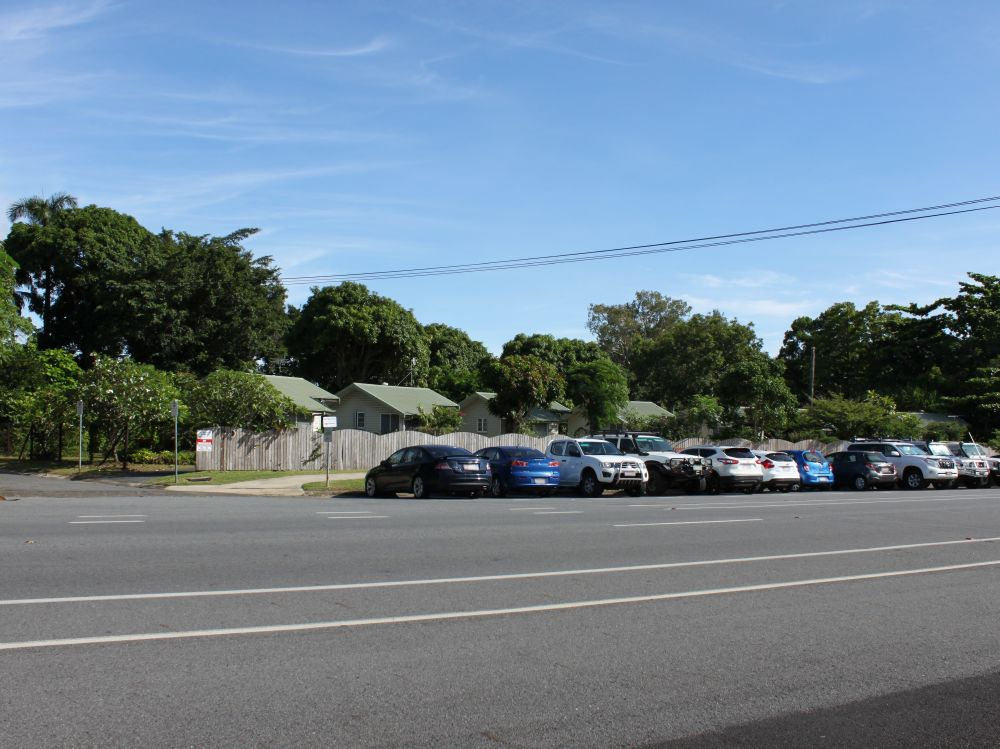
Grove Street Pensioners' Cottages

There is one heritage-listed site in Parramatta Park:

- Grove Street Pensioners' Cottages, 28D Grove Street

== Education ==
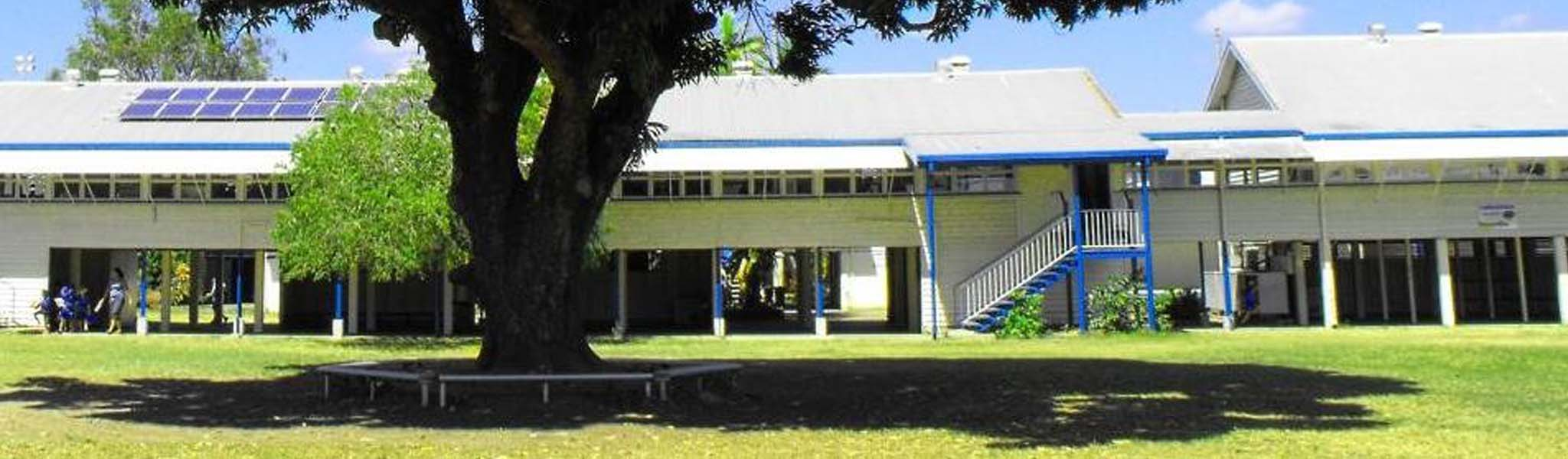
Parramatta State School, 2020

Parramatta State School is a government primary (Early Childhood to Year 6) school for boys and girls at 122 Mulgrave Road (16.9251°S 145.7632°E). In 2016, the school had an enrolment of 379 students with 46 teachers (39 full-time equivalent) and 40 non-teaching staff (24 full-time equivalent). In 2018, the school had an enrolment of 316 students with 46 teachers (39 full-time equivalent) and 34 non-teaching staff (20 full-time equivalent). It includes a special education program.

St Joseph's School is a Catholic primary (Preparatory to Year 6) school for boys and girls at 13 Loeven Street (16.9265°S 145.7665°E). In 2018, the school had an enrolment of 389 students with 28 teachers (23 full-time equivalent) and 19 non-teaching staff (12 full-time equivalent).

St Augustine's College is a Catholic secondary (7–12) school for boys at 251 Draper Street (16.9263°S 145.7681°E). In 2018, the school had an enrolment of 748 students with 64 teachers (61 full-time equivalent) and 36 non-teaching staff (31 full-time equivalent). Boarding facilities are available.

There is no government secondary school in Parramatta Park. The nearest government secondary school is Cairns State High School in neighbouring Cairns North to the north-east.

== Amenities ==
St Joseph's Catholic Church is on the corner of Draper and Loeven Streets (16.9259°S 145.7676°E). Services are also held in the chapel of St Augustine's College and at Trinity Chapel in Mercy Place aged care facility (formerly Bethlehem Home) in Gatton Street, Westcourt. These are within the Parramatta Park Parish of the Roman Catholic Diocese of Cairns.

The Cairns Showground is at the corner of Severin Street and Mulgrave Road (16.9270°S 145.7625°E).
