= Benevolent asylum =

19th century institutions in the Australian colonies

Benevolent asylums, also known as destitute asylums or infirmaries for the destitute, were institutions established throughout the colonies of Australia in the 19th century to house destitute men; deserted, vagrant or homeless women and their children; and orphans not able to support themselves. Poor conditions in the sleeping quarters and harsh treatment in some of these institutions created unpleasant experiences for many of those who had to reside in such places.

The colony of Victoria had nine benevolent asylums, of which three were attached to hospitals, in 1857, with an annual cost to the colony (including some building costs) of £124,250.

By January 1860 there were 11 benevolent asylums in the colony of New South Wales, housing 1,282 inmates and with a total annual expenditure of £25,822.

== Benevolent Asylums and Infirmaries in Australia ==
- New South Wales
  - Benevolent Asylum (Hyde Park, Sydney)
  - Carcoar Hospital and Benevolent Asylum
  - Deniliquin Benevolent Asylum
  - Eden Benevolent Asylum
  - Goulburn Benevolent Asylum
  - Hawkesbury Benevolent Asylum, Windsor
  - Liverpool Benevolent Asylum
  - Newcastle Benevolent Society
  - Newington Benevolent Asylum
  - Parramatta Benevolent Asylum
  - Queanbeyan Hospital and Benevolent Asylum
  - Randwick Asylum for Destitute Children
  - Scone Benevolent Asylum and Hospital
  - Singleton and Patrick's Plains Benevolent Asylum
  - Sydney Infirmary and Dispensary, now Sydney Hospital
- Victoria
  - Ararat Benevolent Asylum
  - Belfast (Port Fairy) Hospital and Benevolent Asylum
  - Ballarat Benevolent Asylum
  - Casterton Benevolent Asylum
  - Castlemaine Benevolent Asylum
  - Creswick Hospital and Benevolent Asylum
  - Daylesford Hospital and Benevolent Asylum
  - Eaglehawk Benevolent Asylum
  - Hamilton Hospital and Benevolent Asylum
  - Ovens Benevolent Asylum, Beechworth
  - Port Fairy Hospital and Benevolent Asylum
  - Sandhurst (Bendigo) Female Benevolent Asylum
  - Sandhurst (Bendigo) Male Benevolent Asylum
  - Melbourne Benevolent Asylum now Kingston Centre
  - Victorian Benevolent Hospital/Asylum, later known as Mount Royal (closed)
  - Geelong Infirmary and Benevolent Asylum
  - Bendigo Benevolent Asylum and Industrial School
  - Warrnambool Benevolent Asylum
- South Australia
  - Adelaide Destitute Asylum
  - Home for Incurables
- Queensland
  - Dunwich Benevolent Asylum
- Tasmania
  - Launceston Benevolent Asylum

Several of the buildings of the Adelaide Destitute Asylum are now home to the SA Migration Museum, which opened on August 26, 2003.
