= North Stradbroke Island Historical Museum =

North Stradbroke Island Museum on Minjerribah
- Established: 1987
- Location: 15-17 Welsby Street; Dunwich, Queensland; Australia
- Coordinates: 27.4977°S 153.4040°E
- Type: Historical
- Website: North Stradbroke Island Historical Museum

The North Stradbroke Island Museum on Minjerribah is a community museum founded in 1987 to present the history of North Stradbroke Island. It is found at 15–17 Welsby Street, in Dunwich on North Stradbroke Island. The museum comprises four buildings: the Dunwich Benevolent Asylum, the main building, the Herdsman's Hut, and a replica of the first Dunwich Post Office. The museum also contains archives with local documents and images.

The museum contains the following exhibits:

- Aboriginal Room
- Pioneer Room
- Lighthouse
- Shipping
- Whale Skull (on loan from the Queensland Museum)
