= RAAF Station Sandgate =

Coordinates: 27°17′23.34″S 153°3′49.69″E

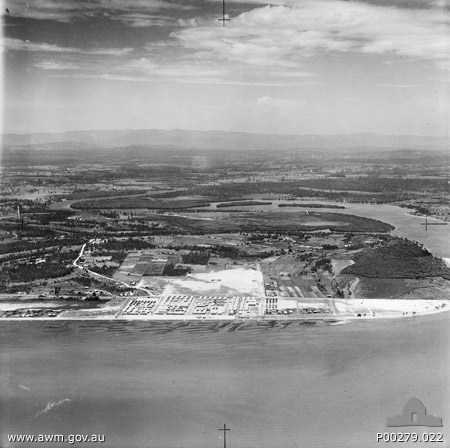
RAAF Station Sandgate

RAAF Station Sandgate was a Royal Australian Air Force (RAAF) station located at Brighton, Queensland during World War II.

The Station was formed on 16 December 1940 under the command of Squadron Leader H.A. Rigby, MC. An advance party arrived at Sandgate prior to the Station's formation and found that works on the installation had been suspended. Station Headquarters, No. 3 Initial Training School and No. 3 Embarkment Depot were based at Amberley, the airmen billeted at RAAF Station Archerfield and the officers at the Hotel Canberra in Brisbane, until 18 April 1941 when the RAAF buildings at Sandgate had been completed.

RAAF Station Sandgate was disbanded on 6 November 1944. The Premier of Queensland, Ned Hanlon, negotiated the purchase of the Station for £25,000 and the Government of Queensland relocated the Dunwich Benevolent Asylum to the site in October 1946, renaming it the Eventide Nursing Home. Eventide closed in 2012. In April 2016, the Queensland Government announced that the site would become the Brighton Health Campus for Queensland Health, providing over 200 beds for community transition care, rehabilitation and residential aged care.

== Units based at Sandgate ==
=== No. 3 Initial Training School ===
No. 3 Initial Training School was formed as part of the Empire Air Training Plan on 16 December 1940. Recruits started their training with a few weeks at an Initial Training School to learn the basics of military life. They were taught subjects such as mathematics, navigation and aerodynamics. The school relocated to Kingaroy via Amberley in 1942.

=== No. 3 Embarkment Depot ===
No. 3 Embarkment Depot was formed on 16 December 1940. At the end of their courses of training aircrew and ground staff were posted to embarkation depots, where they were appropriately kitted and given a final medical examination before deploying to operational theatres.

== Sandgate RAAF Station Memorial ==
In 1999 a memorial was dedicated "To All Who Served Here Especially Those Who Did Not Return"

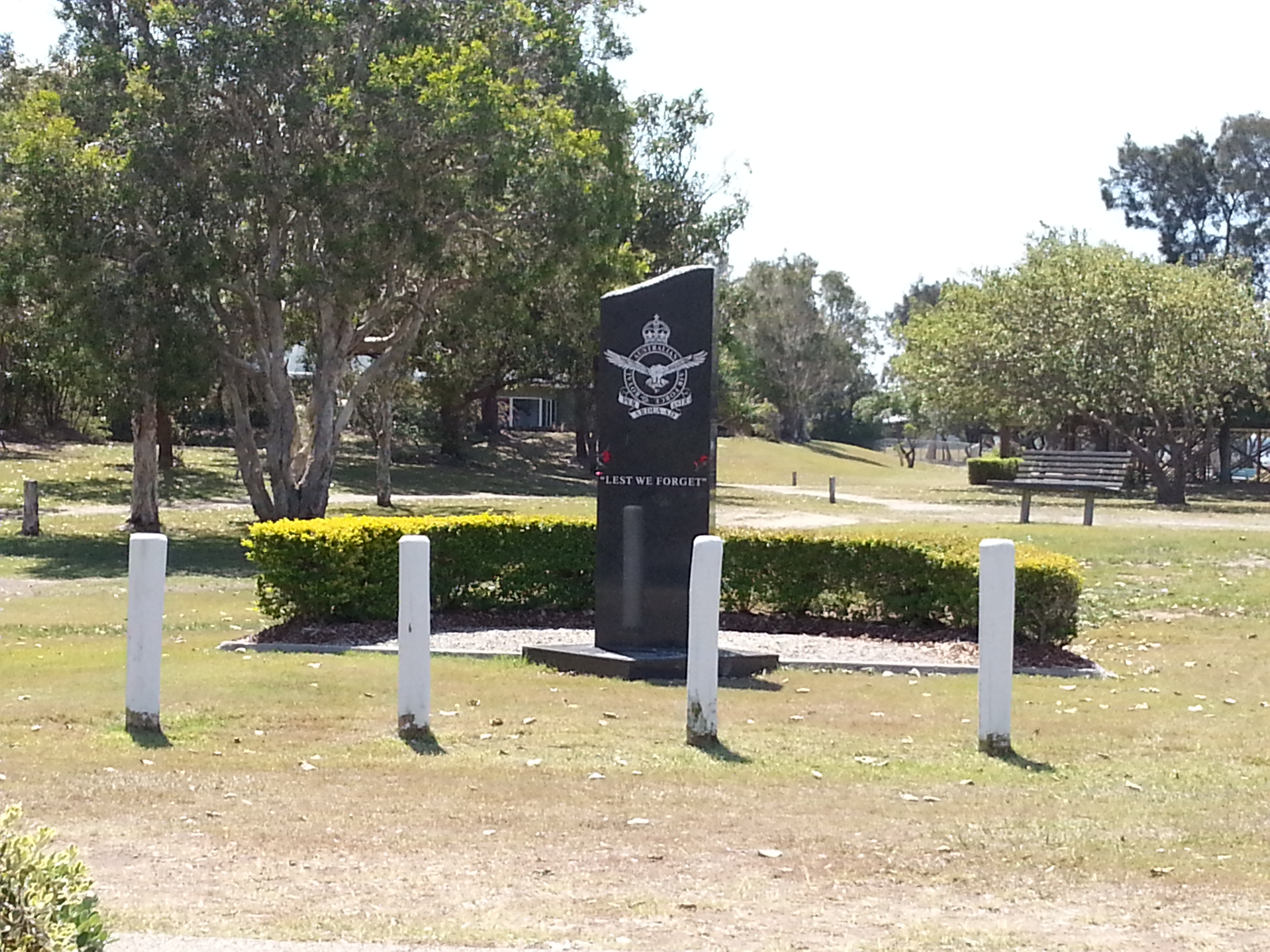
Memorial at Site of RAAF Station Sandgate

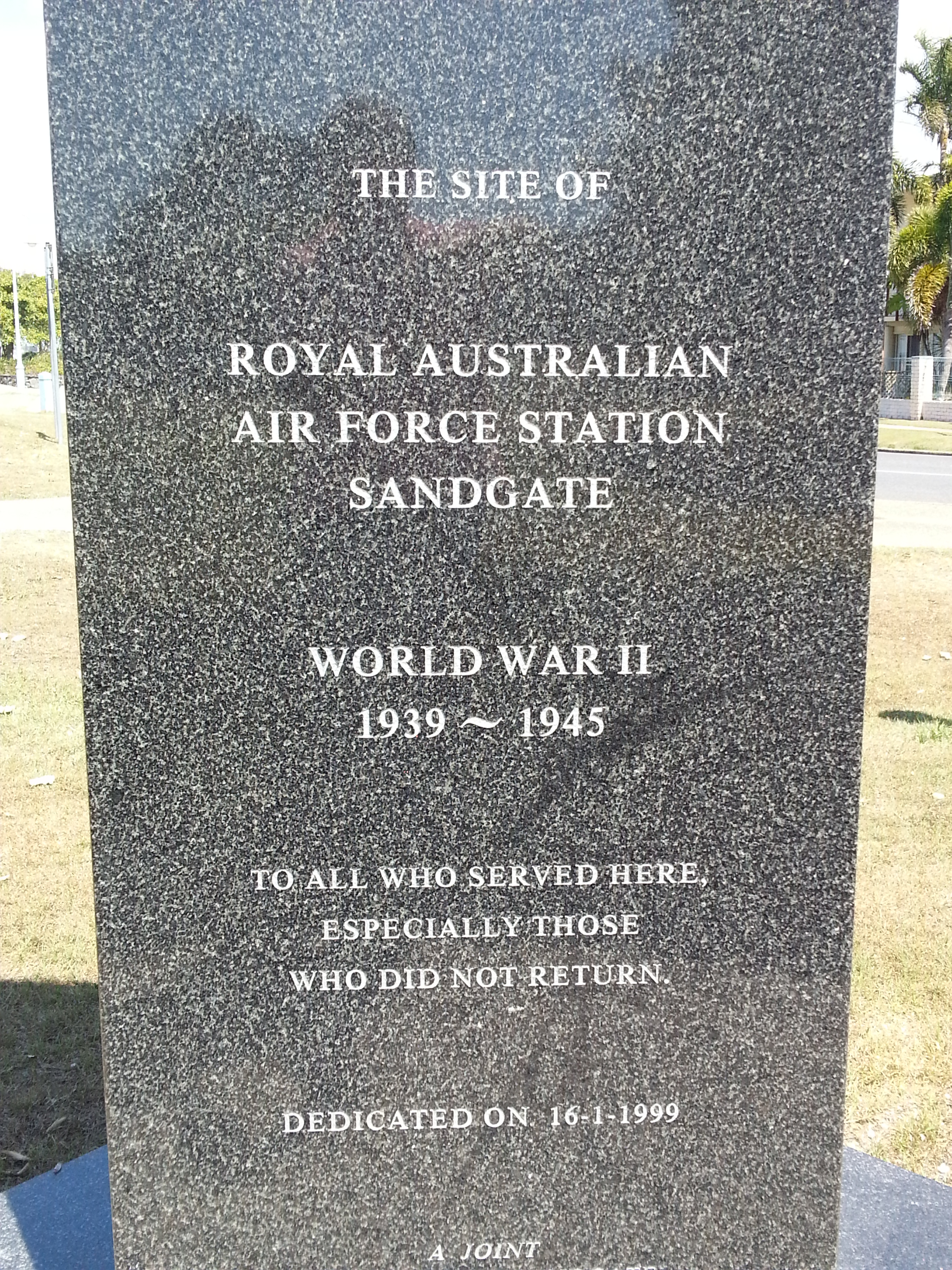
Close-up of memorial showing details

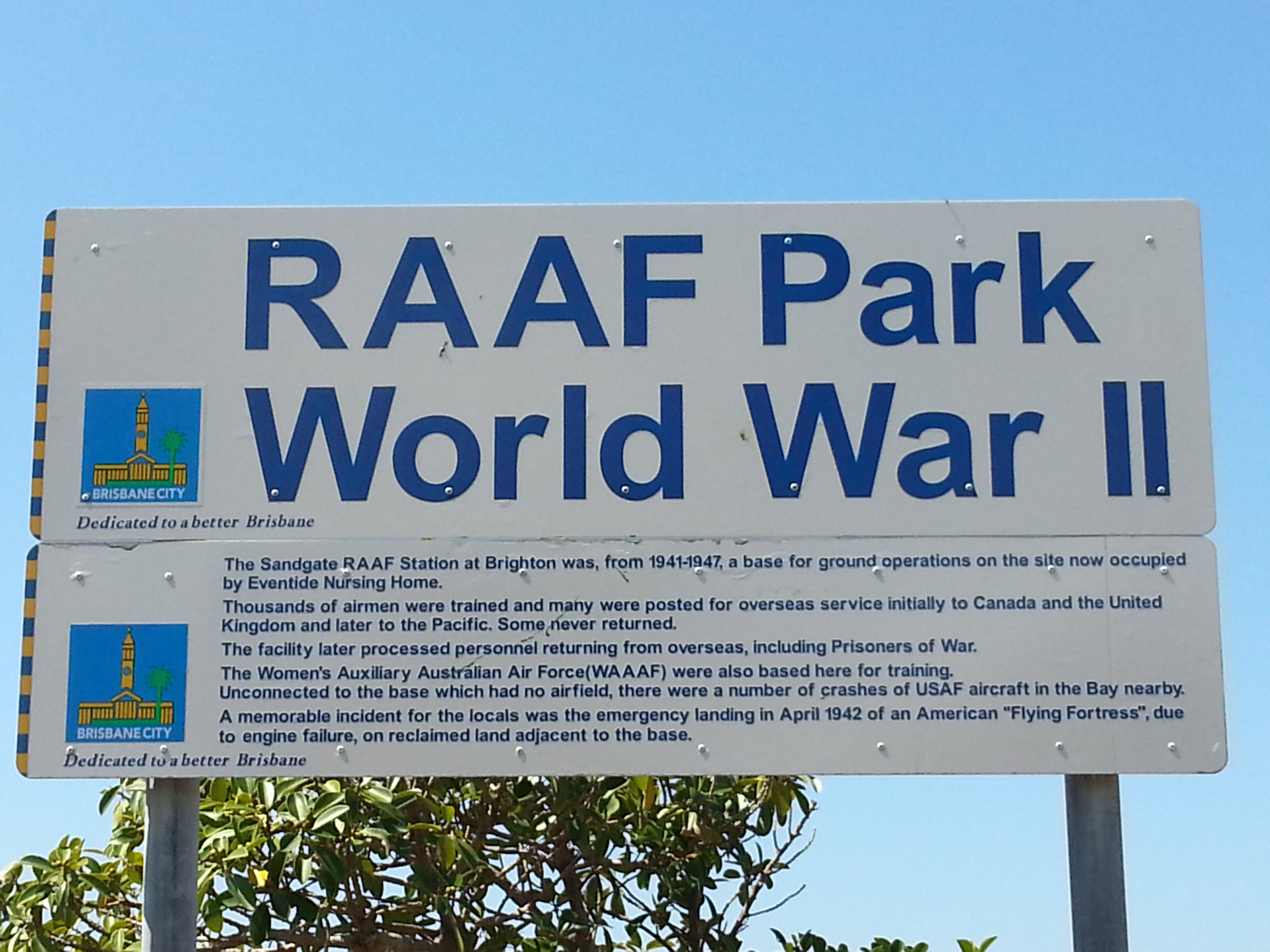
Sign adjacent to memorial about the RAAF Station Sandgate
