= Dunwich Benevolent Asylum =

Benevolent asylum in Queensland, Australia

Coordinates: 27.497°S 153.403°E

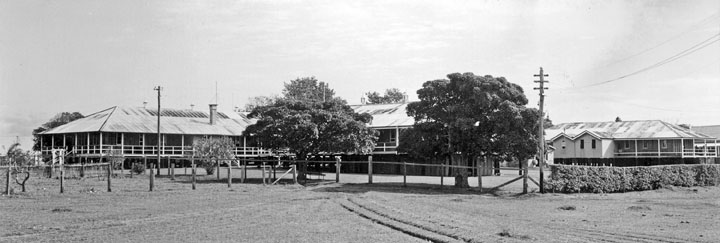
Dunwich Benevolent Asylum, 1937

The Dunwich Benevolent Asylum was a Benevolent Asylum for the aged, infirm and destitute operated by the Queensland Government in Australia. It was located at Dunwich on North Stradbroke Island in Moreton Bay and operated from 1865 to 1946.

== History ==
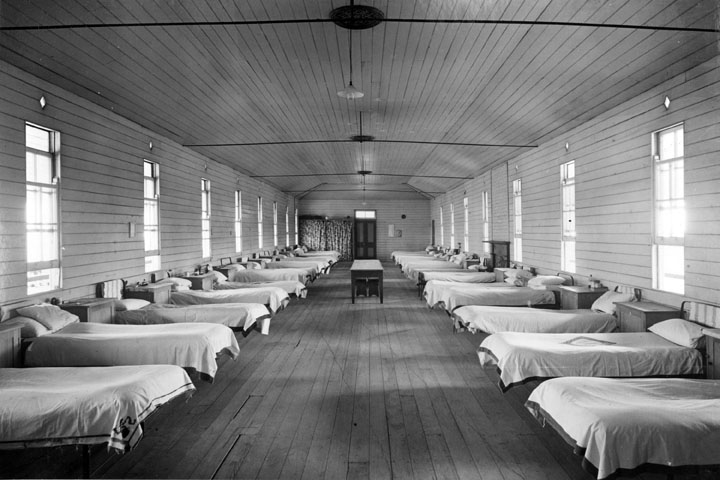
Dormitory, 1937

The Dunwich Benevolent Asylum was established under the Benevolent Asylum Wards Act of 1861 to provide accommodation and care to poor people unable to care for themselves due to illness or infirmity. It opened on 13 May 1865 with the transfer of initial patients from the Benevolent Ward of the Brisbane General Hospital.

Over 21,000 people were admitted to the asylum during its operation, with around 1000 to 1600 at any one time. Those who died in the asylum were generally buried in the Dunwich Cemetery unless families made other arrangements. In the 80 years spanning 1867–1947, 8,426 former inmates of the Dunwich Benevolent Asylum were buried in the Dunwich Cemetery.

It operated until 30 September 1946, after which the patients were transferred to the newly opened Eventide Home at Sandgate, a northern suburb of Brisbane. Most of the buildings were subsequently destroyed. However, some buildings remain including the heritage-listed St Mark's Anglican Church and Dunwich Public Hall.

The 'Aboriginal Gang' that worked the Dunwich Benevolent Asylum were the first Aboriginal people in Australia to receive equal wages. In 1944, after a 25 year campaign, the Aboriginal workers gained equal wages almost 20 years before anywhere else in Australia. The Asylum closed shortly after with the Aboriginal Gang only getting equal wages for one and a half years.

== Geography ==
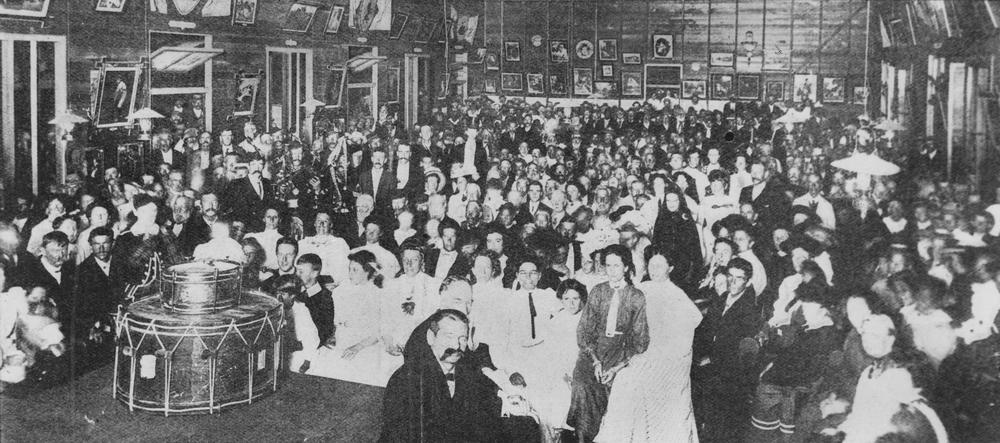
Concert in the Victoria Hall for the Dunwich inmates, 1909

The asylum occupied most of the current Dunwich township. There were many buildings with wards for men, women and Asiatics. It had a kitchen, bakery, laundry and other service buildings including a power station from 1926. It had a public hall, recreational facilities and a visitor centre for social activities. A farm with associated outbuildings provided meat and dairy products. A 1913 map shows it occupying the coastal area from Dunwich Cemetery down to the present day jetty and inland to approximately the present day Mitchell Crescent and Barton Street. Swamps are shown beyond the boundaries.

== Research holdings ==
Archival material on Dunwich Benevolent Asylum is held by the Queensland State Archives and by the North Stradbroke Island Historical Museum.

== Notable inmates ==
- Alexandre Arsène Girault, entomologist
