= Janday language =

Extinct Australian Aboriginal language

Jandai
- Native to: Australia
- Region: Stradbroke Island
- Ethnicity: Quandamooka, Goenpul
- Extinct: (date missing)
- Language family: Pama–Nyungan: Durubalic; Jandai

Language codes
- ISO 639-3: jan
- Glottolog: yaga1256 Yagara-Jandai
- AIATSIS: E19
- ELP: Janday

Jandai is an Australian Aboriginal language of the Quandamooka people who live around the Moreton Bay region of Queensland. Other names and spellings are Coobenpil; Djandai; Djendewal; Dsandai; Goenpul; Janday; Jendairwal; Jundai; Koenpel; Noogoon; Tchandi. Traditionally spoken by members of the Goenpul people, it has close affinities with Nunukul language (spoken by the Nunukul people) and Gowar language (spoken by the Ngugi people). Today now only few members still speak it.

== Classification ==
The three tribes that comprise the Quandamooka people spoke dialects of a Durubalic language. The language that the Goenpul tribe of central and southern Stradbroke Island speaks is Jandai, and the Nunukul dialect of northern Stradbroke island was called Moondjan, the term for its distinctive word for "no".

Bowern (2011) lists five Durubalic languages:

- Jandai (Janday)
- Turrubal (Turubul) and Yagara (Jagara)
- Nunukul (Nunungal, Moonjan)
- Gowar (Guwar)

Dixon (2002) considers all but Guwar to be different dialects of the Yagara language.

== Phonology ==
=== Consonants ===
	Peripheral		Laminal	Apical
	Labial	Velar	Palatal	Alveolar
Plosive	p	k	c	t
Nasal	m	ŋ	ɲ	n
Rhotic				r
Lateral				l
Approximant	w		j	

- /c/ can be heard as either voiceless [c] or voiced [ɟ].
- Stop sounds /p, t, k/ may also be heard as voiced [b, d, ɡ].

=== Vowels ===
	Front	Central	Back
Close	i		u
Mid	e		o
Open		a	

- Vowel length is also distinctive.

== Vocabulary ==
Some words from the Jandai language include:

- Maroomba bigi/maroomba biggee: good day
- Juwanbinl: bird
- Buneen: echidna
- Gagarr: fish
- Murri: kangaroo
- Dumbirrbi: koala
- Gabul: snake
- Bingil: grass
- Humpi: home/camp
- Djara: land
- Juhrram: rain
- Bigi: sun
- Dabbil: water
- Bargan: boomerang
- Goondool: canoe
- Jahlo: fire
- Marra: hand
- Jalwang: knife
- Tabbil: water
- Wanya: where?
- Ragi: bush
