= Moreton Bay conflict =

1832–1833 conflict between the British penal settlement and the Quandamooka peoples

Moreton Bay conflict (1832–1833)
- Part of the Australian frontier wars
- Robert Dixon's 1842 survey of Moreton Bay
Date	1832–1833
Location	Moreton Bay, Moreton Island (Mulgumpin) and North Stradbroke Island (Minjerribah), Colony of New South Wales
Result	Indeterminate; decline of conflict following reduction of the Moreton Bay penal settlement

Belligerents
United Kingdom of Great Britain and Ireland; Colony of New South Wales	Quandamooka people (Nunukul, Ngugi, Goenpul clans)

Commanders and leaders
Captain James Clunie; Governor Sir Ralph Darling; Governor Sir Richard Bourke	Eulope (Napoleon)

Strength
70–100 soldiers of the 17th (Leicestershire) Regiment	400–500 Quandamooka islanders (estimated)

Casualties and losses
5-8 convicts and pilots killed; dozens wounded	Estimated 30-40 killed or wounded
- Part of the broader conflict of Australian frontier wars

The Moreton Bay conflict of 1832–1833 was a period of violent confrontation between the Moreton Bay penal settlement and the Quandamooka islander clans of North Stradbroke Island and Moreton Island, in what is now Queensland, Australia. Sparked by growing tensions over land use, resources, and the treatment of Aboriginal women. The conflict had its origins in 1827, when the establishment of military and convict outposts on the islands led to increasing tensions with the local Indigenous islanders, but it escalated significantly in late 1831 following a British punitive expedition to Moreton Island. The expedition was launched amid fears that the Quandamooka were preparing a coordinated attack on the mainland settlement at Eagle Farm, leading to a massacre that intensified hostilities across the region. The conflict formed part of the wider Australian frontier wars, reflecting the growing violence associated with land occupation, resource competition, and cultural clashes between colonists and Aboriginal communities.

== Background ==
The Moreton Bay penal settlement was established in 1824 as a "prison within a prison" for recidivist convicts from Sydney. Following the transfer of the colony from Redcliffe to the Brisbane River, outstations were created at Amity Point and Dunwich on North Stradbroke Island to service shipping entering Moreton Bay.

By 1827, convict labourers were working at Dunwich to construct a causeway and warehouse, marking the first permanent European settlement on the island. As European activity expanded, tensions grew with the local Quandamooka people, whose lands, food sources and water supplies were increasingly disrupted. The taking of Aboriginal women by convicts and soldiers further inflamed relations.

By late 1831, relations had deteriorated to the point where officials at Moreton Bay believed that the Quandamooka clans were preparing a coordinated attack on the mainland settlement at Eagle Farm. Acting on these fears, Captain James Clunie, the commandant, authorised a punitive expedition to Moreton Island in December 1831. At dawn, soldiers of the 17th Regiment of Foot attacked a Ngugi camp near a freshwater lagoon, killing around 15 to 20 people. This incident marked a turning point, igniting the cycle of reprisals and skirmishes that continued across the bay through 1832 and 1833.

== Outbreak of violence ==
Tensions erupted into open violence in 1831. A detachment of the 17th Regiment of Foot under Captain James Clunie, the commandant of the penal settlement, led a punitive expedition to Moreton Island (Mulgumpin) after reports of European casualties among shipwreck survivors and escaped convicts.

At dawn, the soldiers surrounded a Ngugi camp near a freshwater lagoon and opened fire, killing an estimated fifteen to twenty people. Contemporary accounts described it as an act of retaliation; later historians have characterised it as a massacre. The violence prompted the rise of local Indigenous leaders, most notably Eulope (also called Napoleon), who began organising coordinated resistance across the Moreton Bay islands.

== Retaliations at Dunwich ==
Following the Moreton Island military expedition, Indigenous Islanders launched retaliatory attacks against the convict outpost at Dunwich on North Stradbroke Island. Several convict escapees were killed and two soldiers were wounded in what contemporary observers described as “payback” for earlier killings. Quandamooka oral traditions link these events to the murder of an elder by a convict named William Reardon and to the broader resentment caused by the 1831 massacre.

These reprisals marked the beginning of a sustained cycle of violence that extended into 1833, with an estimated 30 to 40 people wounded or killed during the period, most of them Indigenous.

== Battle of Moongalba / Battle of Narawai ==
By mid-1832 the violence spread further across the bay. In response to continuing raids and rumours of additional attacks on outstations, Captain Clunie again ordered troops of the 17th Regiment of Foot to patrol the islands. One such operation culminated in a major engagement at a site near the present-day township of Dunwich, close to Amity Point.

The clash occurred near a freshwater lagoon known to the Quandamooka people as Moongalba, close to Cooroon Cooroonpah Creek, or Narawai. The Indigenous force was led by Eulope, a prominent Ngugi or Nunukul leader who had unified the island clans in defence of their territory. British soldiers advanced on the camp at dawn, opening fire after being met with resistance. While colonial sources later described the action as a successful “punishment expedition”, Quandamooka oral histories depict a fierce and prolonged battle in which Eulope and his warriors exploited the heavy vegetation and the limited range of British muskets to repel the soldiers’ advance.

Casualty estimates vary, but contemporary accounts and later reconstructions suggest that around twenty Aboriginal people were killed and several soldiers wounded. The engagement effectively marked the high point of the conflict. Neither side achieved a decisive victory, and after the fighting subsided the British withdrew to the mainland.

The Battle of Moongalba is sometimes conflated with the earlier 1831 Moreton Island massacre; however, modern research treats them as separate but related events within the same cycle of violence across the Moreton Bay islands.

== Aftermath ==
The fighting at Moongalba marked the effective end of sustained hostilities between the British garrison and the Quandamooka clans. The Moreton Bay penal settlement remained on alert for further attacks through late 1832, but no large-scale engagements were recorded after the battle.

Contemporary observers and later historians have described the outcome as a stalemate. While British authorities claimed to have “restored order,” Quandamooka oral traditions maintain that their warriors successfully defended their island and compelled a measure of restraint from the settlement. According to Australian historian Ray Kerkhove, the aftermath was described as “terms of coexistence” between the Stradbroke communities and the colony, based on limited cooperation and cautious trade.

The broader political context also shifted. By 1832, officials in Sydney had begun questioning the expense and practicality of maintaining the isolated penal settlement. Recommendations for closure were issued in 1832 and again in 1835, and convict numbers were steadily reduced from 1837. The Moreton Bay settlement was formally abolished in 1839.

== Significance ==
The Moreton Bay conflict of 1832–1833 is recognised by historians as one of the earliest organised events of frontier warfare in southeastern Queensland. It demonstrated both the capacity for coordinated Indigenous resistance—led by figures such as Eulope (Napoleon)—and the willingness of colonial authorities to employ military force to protect the penal colony’s interests.

The events on Moreton Island and North Stradbroke Island set a precedent for later punitive expeditions elsewhere in the colony, foreshadowing the operations of the Native Police in the 1840s and 1850s. They also revealed the strategic use of geography and knowledge of terrain by the Quandamooka people, who were able to resist complete subjugation and maintain a degree of autonomy over their island territories.

Modern scholarship and Quandamooka oral history identify the conflict as part of the wider Australian frontier wars, illustrating the complex interplay of violence, reprisal, and negotiated coexistence that shaped the early colonial history of the Moreton Bay region.

== See also ==
- Australian frontier wars
- War of Southern Queensland
- History of Queensland
- North Stradbroke Island
- Moreton Bay penal settlement

== Bibliography ==
- Murphy, David (2005). The 17th (Leicestershire) Regiment in New South Wales and Van Diemen's Land 1830–1836. David Murphy. OCLC 225492020.
- Fisher, Rod (1988). "Moreton Bay's first whites and the Quandamooka people". Journal of the Royal Historical Society of Queensland. 13 (3): 93–109.
- Pratt, Rod (1997). "\"A brace of pistols in my pocket... and a cutlass in my hand\": Corporal Archibald Campbell's military service in Australia, 1832–1837". Journal of the Royal Historical Society of Queensland. 16: 343–352.
- Kerkhove, Ray (2019). "Reconstructing the Battle of 'Narawai (Moongalba)'". Queensland Review. 26 (1): 3–31.
- Kerkhove, Ray (2025). "Stradbroke and Moreton Islands 1832–1833". Frontier Battle.
- Connor, John (2002). Conflict in the Colonies: Australian Frontier Wars 1788–1850. Wakefield Press. ISBN 978-1-86254-536-6.
- "Dunwich Convict Causeway (entry 601021)". Queensland Heritage Register. Queensland Heritage Council. Retrieved 1 August 2014 from .
- "Dunwich Cemetery (entry 600773)". Queensland Heritage Register. Queensland Heritage Council. Retrieved 29 August 2009 from .
- Evans, Raymond (2007). A History of Queensland. Cambridge University Press. ISBN 978-0-521-87692-6.
