= Paul Tripcony =

Australian collector (1901–1975)

Paul Tripcony (1901–1975) was an Indigenous Australian and a collector of rare books and Aboriginal stone artefacts from Minjerribah, also known as Stradbroke Island.

== Early life ==
Paul Ambrose Tripcony was born in 1901 at Moongalba, North Stradbroke Island on the Myora Aboriginal mission. He was the son of Thomas Tripcony, whose family had emigrated from Cornwall, England and Mary Rose Rollands, whose mother was Ngugi. Thomas Tripcony and his family farmed cattle at Beerburrum and worked oyster banks in Moreton Bay. Paul Tripcony probably attended the local schools on Stradbroke Island. The family moved to the mainland and Paul took up work as a labourer, brewery cellar hand and driver in Brisbane after 1914. He lived with his mother, sister Anastasia and brother Vincent in Kangaroo Point, Brisbane. Both Vincent and their elder brother Albert Tripcony served with the AIF in World War I. Albert Tripcony was killed in France in 1917.

== Later life ==
Paul joined the local trade union and became an advocate for workers rights. He worked at Queensland Breweries, Bulimba from approximately 1917–1937. Tripcony was sacked by the Brewery for his role as a union representative. He was Queensland Vice President of the Federated Liquor Union from 1936–1937. He subsequently worked for the Brisbane City Council as a refrigerated machinery operator and steam roller driver after 1937. He was exempted from war service in 1942, but served in civil defence.

A keen collector of books, Tripcony was an enthusiast of bookstores, a member of literary and civil liberties societies and amassed a personal library which included a number of rare books. He collected Australian literature, poetry and bush music, books on politics, Australian Aborigines and their culture and collected Aboriginal stone artefacts from around Minjerribah, his childhood home. He visited the shell middens on Stradbroke Island, noting the ancient campgrounds and his knowledge of these informed anthropologists and other researchers who have studied these ancient sites.

He and his brother returned to live at North Stradbroke Island for a period before he moved back to the mainland to reside at Lota from the mid-1960s until his death in 1975. He did not marry or have children and was survived by his large extended family, including nephew Robert Anderson, a Quandamooka Elder. Tripcony's ashes were placed in his mother's grave at Dunwich Cemetery on North Stradbroke Island. Many items from Tripcony's artefacts collection were donated to the University of Queensland Anthropology Museum and his book and ephemera collection to the University of Queensland Fryer Library.

== Personal works ==
Paul's handwritten creation story, The Legend of the Lightning's Playground can be found in his nephew's biography and in the Museum of Brisbane. Tripcony interviewed writer and activist Oodgeroo Noonuccal, who had also grown up on Minjerribah and they discussed the languages and history of the island. This recording can be found in the Fryer Library at The University of Queensland, in addition to nine boxes of his papers, correspondence and photographs. His sister, Anastasia's history of the family on Minjerribah can also be found there.
