= Aileen Moreton-Robinson =

Indigenous Australian academic, activist and feminist

- Born: Stradbroke Island, Queensland, Australia

Academic background
- Education: Australian National University; Griffith University
- Thesis: Talkin' up to the white woman: Indigenous women and feminism in Australia (1998)

Academic work
- Discipline: Women's studies; Sociology; Indigenous studies
- Main interests: Indigenous sovereignty; Critical whiteness studies

Aileen Moreton-Robinson is an Indigenous Australian academic, Indigenous feminist, author and activist for Indigenous rights. She is a Goenpul woman of the Quandamooka people from Minjerribah (North Stradbroke Island) in Queensland. She completed a PhD at Griffith University in 1998, her thesis titled Talkin' up to the white woman: Indigenous women and feminism in Australia. The thesis was published as a book in 1999 and short-listed for the New South Wales Premier's Literary Awards and the Stanner Award. A 20th Anniversary Edition was released in 2020 by University of Queensland Press. Her 2015 monograph The White Possessive: Property, Power, and Indigenous Sovereignty was awarded the Native American and Indigenous Studies Association's (NAISA) prize in 2016.

Moreton-Robinson was the first Aboriginal person to be appointed to a mainstream lecturing position in women's studies in Australia, was Australia's first Indigenous Distinguished Professor, and the first Indigenous scholar from outside the US to be elected as an honorary member of the American Academy of Arts and Sciences. She has held positions in women's studies at Flinders University, Indigenous studies at Griffith University, Queensland University of Technology, and RMIT. She was formerly the Director of the National Indigenous Research and Knowledges Network and President of the National Aboriginal and Torres Strait Islander Higher Education Consortium (NATSIHEC). She is currently Professor Indigenous Research at the University of Queensland and the ARC Centre of Excellence for Indigenous Futures, Australia's first Indigenous led Centre of Excellence.

== Early life ==
Moreton-Robinson is of the Goenpul (Koenpul) people, who are part of the Quandamooka nation on Stradbroke Island in Queensland, Australia. Moreton-Robinson showed promise as a student in high school, where she received an offer of a scholarship to a Catholic boarding school, which she declined. Her experience of racism and discrimination in high school led to her failing to graduate and becoming politically involved in movements for Aboriginal land rights and human rights for Aboriginal people.

Moreton-Robinson was later accepted to the Australian National University as a mature student, and at the time she was the only Aboriginal student at the university. She completed a 1st class honours degree in sociology from the Australian National University and her doctorate from Griffith University. Aileen's doctoral thesis was titled Talkin' up to the white woman : Indigenous women and feminism in Australia. Her thesis was subsequently published as a book in 1999 which was short-listed for the New South Wales Premier's Literary Awards and the Stanner Award for Indigenous writing.

== Career ==
Moreton-Robinson taught Indigenous studies at Griffith University in Brisbane and Women's Studies at Flinders University in Adelaide. She was an Australian Research Council Postdoctoral Fellow at the Australian Studies Centre, University of Queensland. She worked at Queensland University of Technology from 2006 until 2019, becoming Professor of Indigenous Studies and Dean of Indigenous Research and Engagement. On 17 June 2016 she was the first Aboriginal Professor to be conferred the title of Distinguished Professor there. She has served as Professor of Indigenous Research at RMIT in Melbourne, and an Indigenous Elder Scholar in Residence.

Moreton-Robinson is the Director of the National Indigenous Research Knowledges Network, a former Council Member of the Native American Indigenous Studies Association, Executive member of National, Aboriginal and Torres Strait Islander Higher Education, President of Australian Critical whiteness studies Association, Member of Australian Institute of Aboriginal and Torres Strait Islander Studies, and has held positions on a number of boards, advisory committees and associations. Moreton-Robinson established and is an editor for the International eJournal of Critical Indigenous Studies.

She has been invited to and presented at the University of Washington, University of California Los Angeles, Oberlin College, University of London, University of Geneva, University of Illinois, Dartmouth, Wesleyan University, University of Hawaii, University of Michigan and the University of Alberta.

Distinguished Professor Moreton-Robinson developed a masterclass for Indigenous postgraduate students. The program is designed to build research skills and to improve the completion rates of Indigenous researchers. The Indigenous Research Methodologies Masterclass is the only Indigenous-designed and evidence-based model contributing to closing the education gap in Australia.

== Contributions to theory ==
Moreton-Robinson's research and writing has focused on the experience of Aboriginal Australians since colonial settlement and issues of race and Whiteness studies, post-colonialism, women's studies and indigenous feminism, indigenous studies, native title law and Aboriginal land rights.

Moreton-Robinson, through her series of journal articles which were compiled to create the book The White Possessive, is considered to have made a significant contribution to the field of Indigenous Studies. Maori academic, Hemopereki Simon, refers to this collection of articles and the theory derived from them as "The White Possessive Doctrine" in his application of Moreton-Robinson's theory to Aotearoa/New Zealand.

== Recognition and awards ==
- 2024 Fellow, Academy of the Social Sciences in Australia
- 2020 Fellow, American Academy of Arts and Sciences. The first Indigenous scholar from outside of the US to be chosen.
- 2010 Australian Learning and Teaching Council Award for Excellence in Indigenous Education for the development of The Indigenous Research Methodologies Masterclass

== Works ==
=== Books ===
- Aileen Moreton-Robinson (ed.). 2016. Critical Indigenous Studies: Engagements in First World Locations. Tucson: University of Arizona Press. ISBN 978-0-8165-3273-5.
- Aileen Moreton-Robinson. 2015. The White Possessive: Property, Power, and Indigenous Sovereignty. Minneapolis: University of Minnesota Press. ISBN 978-1-8597-3629-6.
- Aileen Moreton-Robinson, Maryrose Casey, Fiona Nicoll (eds.).2008. Transnational Whiteness Matters. Lexington Books. ISBN 978-0-7391-3221-0.
- Aileen Moreton-Robinson (ed.). 2007. Sovereign Subjects: Indigenous Sovereignty Matters. Allen & Unwin. ISBN 978-1-7411-5701-7.
- Aileen Moreton-Robinson (ed.). 2004. Whitening Race: Essays In Social And Cultural Criticism. Aboriginal Studies Press, ISBN 978-0-8557-5465-5.
- Moreton-Robinson, A., 1999. Talkin' up to the White Woman: Aboriginal Women and Feminism. St Lucia: University of Queensland Press.

=== Other ===
- 2004. Aileen Moreton-Robinson, "Whiteness, epistemology, and indigenous representation", in Whitening Race: Essays In Social And Cultural Criticism, ed. Aileen Moreton-Robinson, Aboriginal Studies Press, ISBN 978-0-8557-5465-5.
- Moreton-Robinson, A., 2004. Treaty Talk: Past, Present and Future. Ngunnawal Centre, University of Canberra, pp. 18
- Moreton-Robinson, A. 2003. I Still Call Australia Home: Indigenous Belonging and Place in a White Postcolonizing Society in Ahmed, S., Castaneda, C., Fortier, A and Sheller, M., (Eds) Uprootings/Regroundings: Questions of Home and Migration. Berg: Oxford. pp. 23–40 (QUT). ISBN 978-0-8166-9214-9.
- Moreton-Robinson, A., 2003a, 'Resistance, Recovery and Revitalisation', in M Grossman (ed.), Blacklines: Contemporary Critical Writing by Indigenous Australians, Melbourne University Press, Melbourne
- Moreton-Robinson, A., 2000. "Troubling Business: Difference and Whiteness within Feminism". Australian Feminist Studies
- Moreton-Robinson, A., 2001. "A Possessive Investment in Patriarchal Whiteness: nullifying native title?", in P Nursey-Bray and CL Bacchi (eds), Left Directions: Is There a Third Way?, UWA Press, Crawley
- Moreton-Robinson, A., 1999. "Unmasking Whiteness: A Goori Jondal's look at Some Duggai Business", Queensland Review
- Moreton-Robinson, A., 1999, 'Wrestling Whiteness, on the Journey to Truth, Justice and Reconciliation', Graduate
- Moreton-Robinson, A., 1998. Witnessing Whiteness in the Wake of Wik. Social AlternativesWomen
- Moreton-Robinson, A., 1998, 'When the Object Speaks, A Postcolonial Encounter: anthropological representations and Aboriginal women's self-presentations, Discourse: Studies in the Cultural Politics of Education, vol. 19, no. 3, pp. 275–289, doi=10.1080/0159630980190302.
