= Lisa Bellear =

Australian artist (1961–2006)

- Publicity photo from The University of Queensland Press
- Born: 2 May 1961; Australia, Sydney
- Died: 5 July 2006 (aged 45); Melbourne, Victoria
- Known for: Poetry, Photography

Lisa Marie Bellear (2 May 1961 in Melbourne, Victoria – 5 July 2006 in Melbourne) was an Indigenous Australian poet, photographer, activist, spokeswoman, dramatist, comedian and broadcaster. She was a Goenpul woman of the Noonuccal people of Minjerribah (Stradbroke Island), Queensland. She was also a Minjungbal woman and with Solomon Islander descent.

== Biography ==
Bellear's mother was Jocelyn 'Binks' Bellear and her father was Stanko Kvesic, a Croatian-born heavyweight boxer. On her mothers side two of her uncles were Bob Bellear, Australia's first Indigenous judge, and Sol Bellear who helped to found the Aboriginal Housing Corporation in Redfern in 1972.

Shortly after Bellear's birth her mother returned to live in the Northern Rivers region of New South Wales and her father moved to Queensland to find work. This left Bellear in the care of the Berry Street Foundling Hospital and, although she planned to return for her daughter, after Jocelyn's death and attempts by the wider Bellear family to claim her, she was made a ward of the state.

Soon after this Bellear was adopted into a white family living in regional Victoria and was told she had Polynesian heritage. Bellear was sexually abused in this home and was later sent, as a boarder, to Sacred Heart College, Ballarat and later finished high school at Mercy Regional College.

Bellear then attended the University of Melbourne, studying social work, where she made friends with many Aboriginal students who encouraged her to look for her adoption records; one of these friends was Destiny Deacon. When doing so she found a letter there from Bob Bellear leading her to make a trip to see them and she remained in contact with them for the remainder of her life.

After completing her undergraduate degree in 1986 she became an Aboriginal liaison officer at the university and assisted other students like her through their studies. She worked there until 1995 and was strongly influence by her own experience of being removed from her family and believed strongly in self-determination. She identified as a ‘blak’ feminist and was committed to Aboriginal women’s rights and education.

Between 1986 and 2006 Bellear was also one of the hosts on Not Another Koori Show! on 3CR Melbourne where she interviewed many different kinds of people. One notable series she led during this time was broadcasting interviews with Aboriginal women who were incarcerated at the Dame Phyllis Frost Centre and having them both read and write poetry. She firmly believed in the power of poetry and saw 'jail poetry' as a "powerful and valid form of expression".

She was a member of the 2003 Victorian Stolen Generations Taskforce, having herself been removed from her parents under this policy.

Bellear died unexpectedly at her home in Melbourne. She was 45 years old and was then buried at Mullumbimby cemetery.

== Published works and photography ==
Bellear's posthumous poetry collection Aboriginal Country, Ed. Jen Jewel Brown, UWA Publishing, 2018 was chosen as one of the books of the year by poet John Kinsella in Australian Book Review. Bellear also wrote Dreaming in Urban Areas (UQP, 1996), a book of poetry which explores the experience of Aboriginal people in contemporary society. She said in an interview with Roberta Sykes that her "poetry was not about putting down white society. It's about self-discovery."

Other poetry was published in journals and newspapers. She was awarded the Deadly Awards prize in 2006 for making an outstanding contribution to literature with the Ilbijerri Theatre Company performed play by Kylie Beling, John Harding and Gary Foley The Dirty Mile: A History of Indigenous Fitzroy (a suburb of Melbourne) based on her original concept; and her many published poems and performances of her writing as a poet, actor and comedian.

Bellear was a prolific photographer. Her work was exhibited at the 2004 Athens Olympic Games and at the Melbourne Museum as part of their millennium celebrations.

== Community activities ==
Bellear was a founding member of the Ilbijerri Aboriginal & Torres Strait Islander Theatre Co-op, the longest-running Aboriginal theatre troupe in Australia. Ilbijerri produced The Dirty Mile in March 2006 as a dramatised walking trail through the streets of Fitzroy, Melbourne.

Bellear also contributed to the Brunswick Power Football Club and the Australian Labor Party.

== Recognition ==
- In 2008 Bellear was inducted posthumously to the Victorian Honour Roll of Women.
- The City of Melbourne in partnership with the Victorian Women's Trust recognised Bellear's life and work in 2018 in naming a laneway in Carlton, Warrior Woman Lane, after her.
- The University of Melbourne named student accommodation at 303 Royal Parade, Parkville, Melbourne as Lisa Bellear House.
- Victoria University offer the Lisa Bellear Indigenous Research Scholarship.
- Bellear Gardens in the Canberra suburb of Franklin are named in her honour.
