= Jagara =

Jagara may refer to:

- Jagara people, an ethnic group of Australia
- Jagara language, formerly spoken by them
- Jagara (ThunderCats), a fictional character
- Jagara, Assam, a village in India

== See also ==
- Jagera (disambiguation)
- Jagar (ritual), a Hindu ritual in India
- Jaggar Dam, in Karauli District, Rajasthan, India
