= Guwar language =

Extinct Australian Aboriginal language

Gowar
- Ngugi
- Native to: Australia
- Region: Queensland
- Ethnicity: Ngugi Quandamooka
- Era: attested 1886
- Language family: Pama–Nyungan: Durubalic? Bandjalangic?; Guwar–Pimpama ?; Gowar

Language codes
- ISO 639-3: None (mis)
- Glottolog: guwa1244
- AIATSIS: E26

Gowar is an extinct indigenous language of Australia. The language was spoken on Moreton Island off the coast of modern-day Brisbane.

== Name ==
Other spellings and names for Guwar are Goowar, Gooar, Guar, Gowr-burra; other names Ngugi (Mugee, Wogee, Gnoogee), Chunchiburri, Booroo-geen-merrie. The name of the language comes from the word for 'no', gooar or goowar.

== Revival ==
Guwar is currently undergoing revival by the Ngugi people. Various language guides and dictionaries of Guwar have been produced.

== Classification ==
Conventionally, Guwar is classified as a Durubalic language. However, Tony Jeffries argues that Guwar (along with the Pimpama language) belongs to the Bandjalangic languages, having been influenced greatly by Turrbal. However, the classification of Guwar as Durubalic is more widely accepted.

== Phonology ==
=== Vowels ===
Guwar has a three-vowel system, with both short and long vowels.

Guwar vowels
	Front		Central		Back	
	short	long	short	long	short	long
High	i	iː			u	uː
Low			a	aː		

=== Consonants ===
Guwar consonants
	Labial	Velar	Palatal	Apical
Plosive	p	k	c	t
Nasal	m	ŋ	ɲ	n
Rhotic				r ɹ
Lateral				l
Approximant	w		j	
