= Ngugi =

Ngugi or Ngũgĩ is a name of Kikuyu origin that may refer to:

- Ngugi wa Mirii (1951–2008), Kenyan playwright
- Ngũgĩ wa Thiong'o (1938-2025), Kenyan writer
- David Mwaniki Ngugi, Kenyan politician and member of the National Assembly of Kenya
- John Ngugi (born 1962), Kenyan long-distance runner and 1988 Olympic champion
- Mary Wacera Ngugi (born 1988), Kenyan long-distance runner
- Mũkoma wa Ngũgĩ (born 1971), Kenyan poet and author
- Packson Ngugi, Kenyan actor
- Wanjiku wa Ngũgĩ (born 1970s), Kenyan writer and political analyst

== See also ==
- Ngugi people, an Indigenous Australian group around Queensland
