= Amity, Queensland =

Amity (Bulan)
- Town
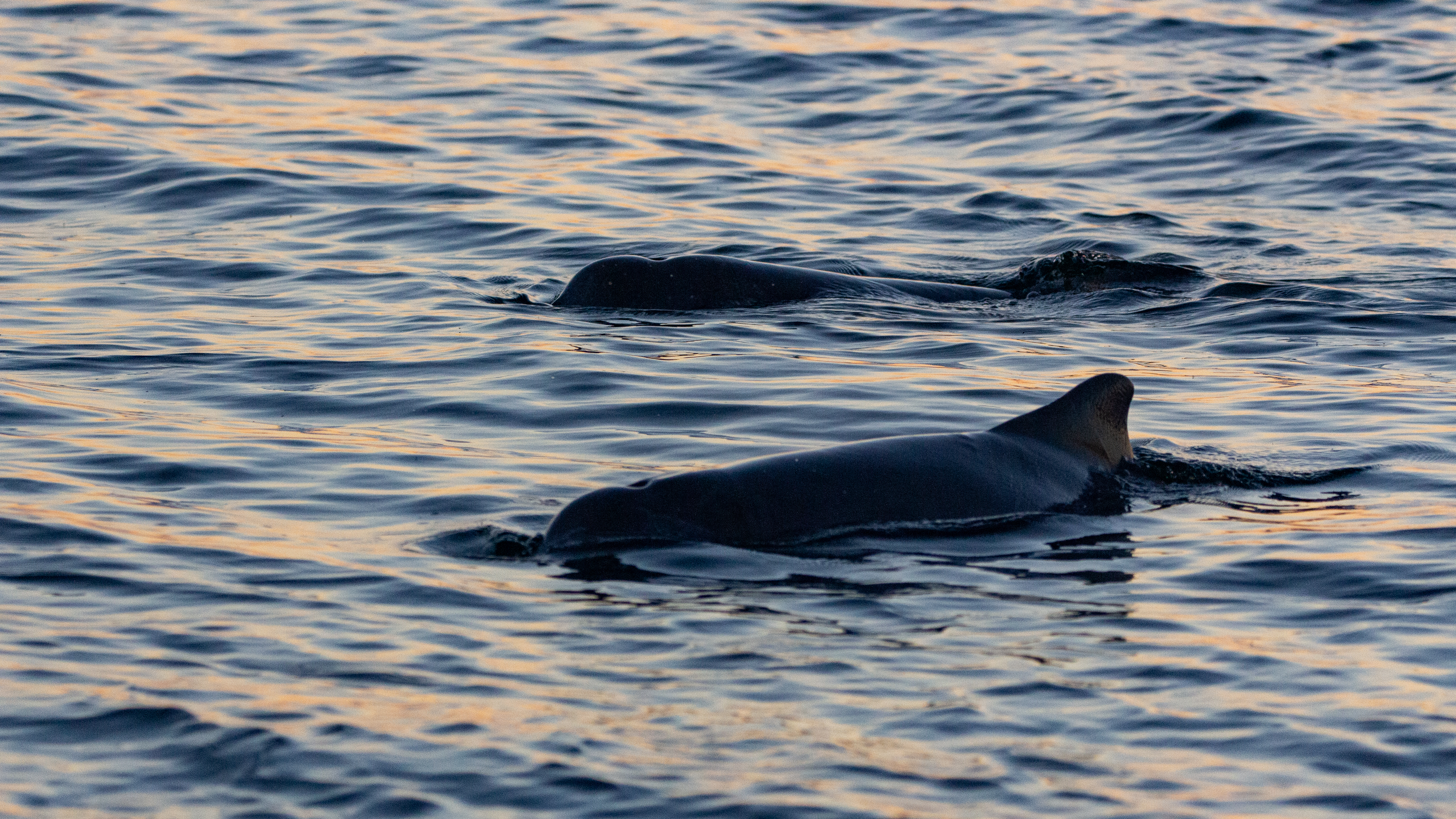
- Bottlenose Dolphins, off Amity Point, 2021

- Interactive map of Amity (Bulan)
- Coordinates: 27.3952°S 153.4411°E
- Country: Australia
- State: Queensland
- City: North Stradbroke Island
- LGA: Redland City
- Location: 14.0 km (8.7 mi) WNW of Point Lookout; 16.6 km (10.3 mi) NNE of Dunwich
- Established: 1824

Government
  - State electorate: Oodgeroo
  - Federal division: Bowman

Area
  - Total: 5.8 km^{2} (2.2 sq mi)

Population
  - Total: 453 (2021 census)
  - Density: 78.1/km^{2} (202.3/sq mi)
- Time zone: UTC+10:00 (AEST)
- Postcode: 4183

Amity is a coastal town and locality on North Stradbroke Island in the City of Redland, Queensland, Australia. In the 2021 census, the locality of Amity had a population of 453 people.

It is known as Bulan by the traditional owners, the Quandamooka people.

== Geography ==
Amity is located on the north western point of North Stradbroke Island (known as Amity Point). Directly north is the South Passage and the southern tip of Moreton Island. To the east lies the small town of Point Lookout and to the south lies the main town of North Stradbroke Island, Dunwich. Wallum Creek snakes along the southern border of the town. Rainbow Channel lies directly adjacent to Amity Point in Moreton Bay.

== History ==
=== Nunukul village ===
The Aboriginal people of the area before British colonisation were the Nunukul. They had a close affiliation with the Ngugi people of nearby Moreton Island. The Nunukul were proficient fishers who hunted dugong (yungon), turtle, oysters, mullet, nautilus, as well as other seafood and land animals. The women were expert dillybag (dili) makers. Amity Point was one of several seasonal villages that the Nunukul occupied on the island. Modern day descendants of these people are called the Quandamooka.

=== Convict castaways ===
In 1823, the first Europeans arrived at Amity. These were three British convicts named Thomas Pamphlett, Richard Parsons and John Finnegan, who had become lost at sea with their boat washing up on Moreton Island. They lived peacefully with the Nunukul at Amity Point for a few months before eventually returning to British society.

=== Naming of Amity Point ===
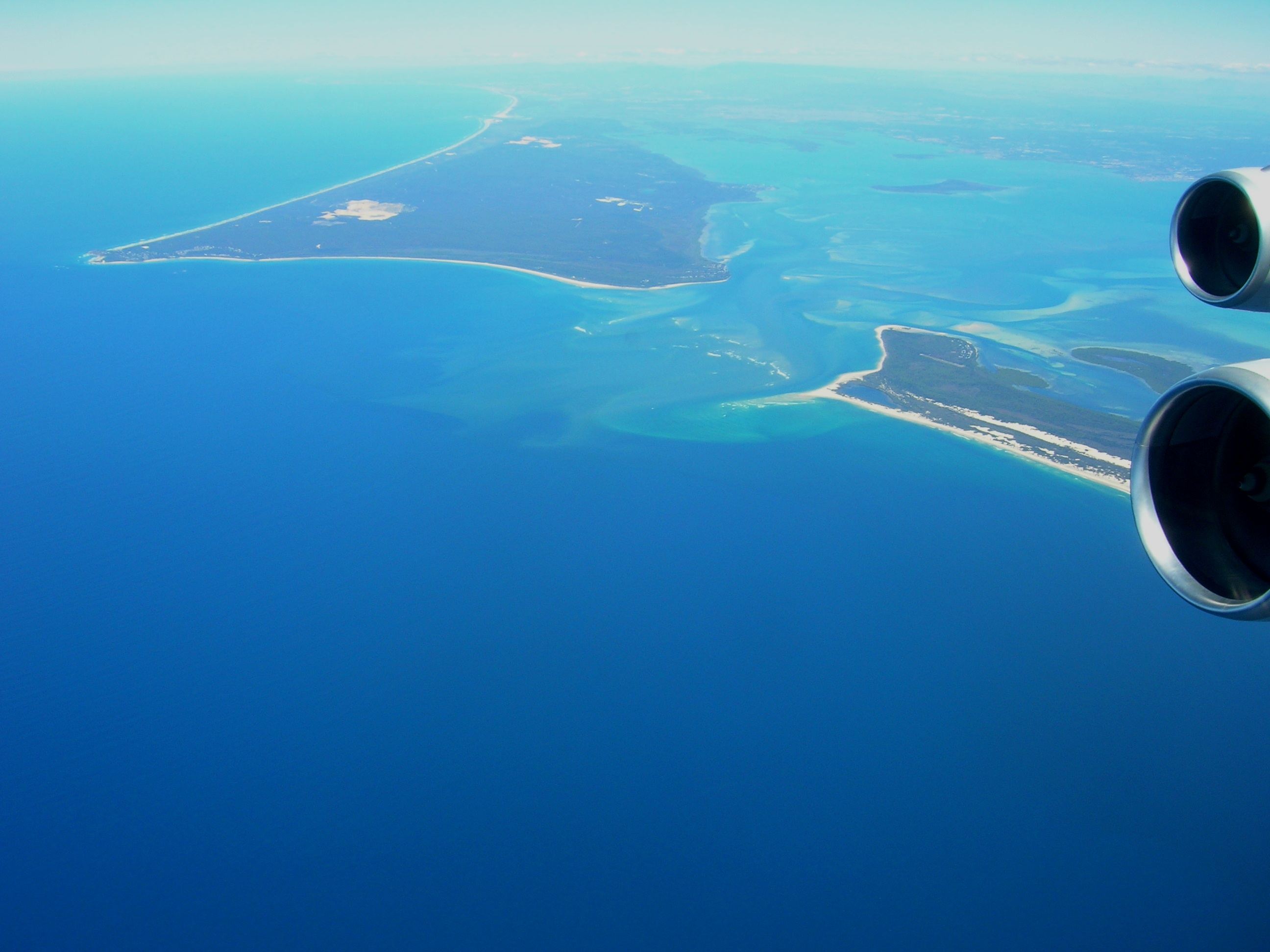
The South Passage, with Amity located on the lower, right side of North Stradbroke Island, the island at the top of image

In 1824, John Oxley and Robert Hoddle named the headland Amity Point after the brig Amity they sailed in when surveying the area during the establishment of the Moreton Bay penal colony. It had also been given the name Cypress Point for which it was only known as for a brief period.

=== Maritime pilot station ===
In 1825, the site was chosen as a maritime pilot station by John Gray because of its location close to the South Passage into Moreton Bay. It was the first British settlement on Stradbroke Island.

The pilot station was occupied by the pilot, the convict boat crew and several soldiers. An adjacent village of Ngugi and Nunukul people co-existed with the pilot station, its occupants still living a mostly traditional lifestyle throughout the 1830s.

By the 1840s some of the local Ngugi and Nunukul men became employed as crew for the pilot boat at Amity.

In 1847, the paddle steamer Sovereign was wrecked in heavy swell in the passage off Amity. Forty-four people on board died, but ten were saved, mostly through the efforts of the Aboriginal pilot boat crewmen named Toompani, Billy Cassim, Jack Kalider, Poonipun and Woondi. They all received an Aboriginal breastplate as a reward and Toompani also was given a boat.

The wreck of the Sovereign highlighted the dangers of using the South Passage between Stradbroke and Moreton Island for shipping, and the main shipping channel for Brisbane was transferred to the safer North Passage between Bribie and Moreton Island. As a result, the pilot station at Amity was shut in 1848 and moved to the northern part of Moreton Island.

=== Dugong fishing station ===
After the relocation of the pilot station, Amity became a base for commercial dugong fishing operations. This was primarily led by a Filipino ex-convict named Fernandez Gonzales, who had befriended the local Aboriginal community at Amity. He had married a Ngugi woman named Junnumbin (Juno) and was able to work with Aboriginal people to harvest the dugong. Other fishing ventures owned by the Campbell brothers and the Stillers also became based at Amity.

Amity maintained a strong Aboriginal presence, with around 150 Indigenous people resident there during the 1850s. In 1853, convict escapees from Norfolk Island terrorised Amity's population before their eventual re-capture.

=== Township ===
Amity was declared a reserve for a township in 1884 and the first land sales occurred in 1886. The street names chosen for the town honoured some of its notable Aboriginal and immigrant residents. Toompany Street honoured the hero of the Sovereign wreck; while Kindarra Street was named after a respected Aboriginal woman (who later died after being forcibly moved to the Cherbourg Aboriginal incarceration site). Streets were also named after Fernandez Gonzales, the Filipino dugong fisherman.

A supply boat called The Otter, which also carried tourists, ran between Brisbane's central business district and Amity from 1885 to 1946.

Amity Point State School opened on 7 April 1919, but closed in 1920. On 22 February 1937, it reopened as Cylinder Beach Provisional School. After 8 months the school was relocated to a site approx 1.6 km (0.99 mi) from Amity Point, where it reopened on 19 October 1937 as Amity Provisional School, but closed on 2 September 1938. On 30 January 1951, the school reopened as Amity Point State School. It closed permanently on 19 November 1961.

Amity Point Post Office opened around 1942.

St Peter's Anglican Church was dedicated on 29 October 1957 by Venerable Frank Knight. Its closure circa 2018 was approved by Locum Bishop Godfrey Fryar.

Amity was badly affected by coastal erosion due to tidal outflows, storms and vegetation removal. Around 200 metres of shoreline was lost at Amity from the 1890s up to the middle of the 20th Century, resulting in the town's racetrack, several properties and streets being permanently submerged by the waters of Moreton Bay. Rock seawalls completed in 1993 helped to preserve the remaining shoreline.

== Demographics ==
In the 2006 census, the locality of Amity had a population of 408 people.

In the 2011 census, the locality of Amity had a population of 348 people, 50.3% female and 49.7% male. The median age of the Amity population was 53 years, compared to the national median age of 37. 86% of people living in Amity were born in Australia. The other top responses for country of birth were England 4.4%, New Zealand 1.7%, Solomon Islands 1.2%, Papua New Guinea 1.2%, Latvia 1.2%. 98% of people spoke only English at home; the next most common language was 0.9% Yumplatok (Torres Strait Creole).

In the 2016 census, the locality of Amity had a population of 387 people.

In the 2021 census, the locality of Amity had a population of 453 people.

== Education ==
There are no schools in Amity. The nearest government primary school is Dunwich State School in Dunwich to the south. The nearest government secondary school is Cleveland District State High School in Cleveland on the mainland.

== Infrastructure ==
Amity has little infrastructure built by either the private or public sectors. Due to this, the town's populace have to end up driving to either Dunwich for health and schooling facilities, or going by ferry or boat to the mainland town of Redlands.

=== Public sector ===
The only government infrastructure for the town is a single jetty, a library, a community hall, a Fire Station and a post office. No schools or hospitals are found in the town. This, however, is not due to a lack of government investment for the town, but rather due to the very small size of the town. There are only eighteen roads in the town, with the majority of those very small. Claytons Road, often called Point Lookout Road by the locals, due to the road leading to Point Lookout, is the only road which gives access to Amity from the rest of the island.

The Redland City Council operate the Amity Point Library. It is a very small library being only 22 square metres (240 sq ft) on the veranda of the local community hall and open only 9 hours each week.

=== Private sector ===
Private sector investments on the town only cater for the large number of tourists which come to the island every holiday season to make use of the town's beaches. There is a caravan park that caters for the budget traveller in the town. The cricket club at Amity is the only investment by the private sector that is catered for the local populace of the town, though it still receives much business from tourists.

== Environment ==
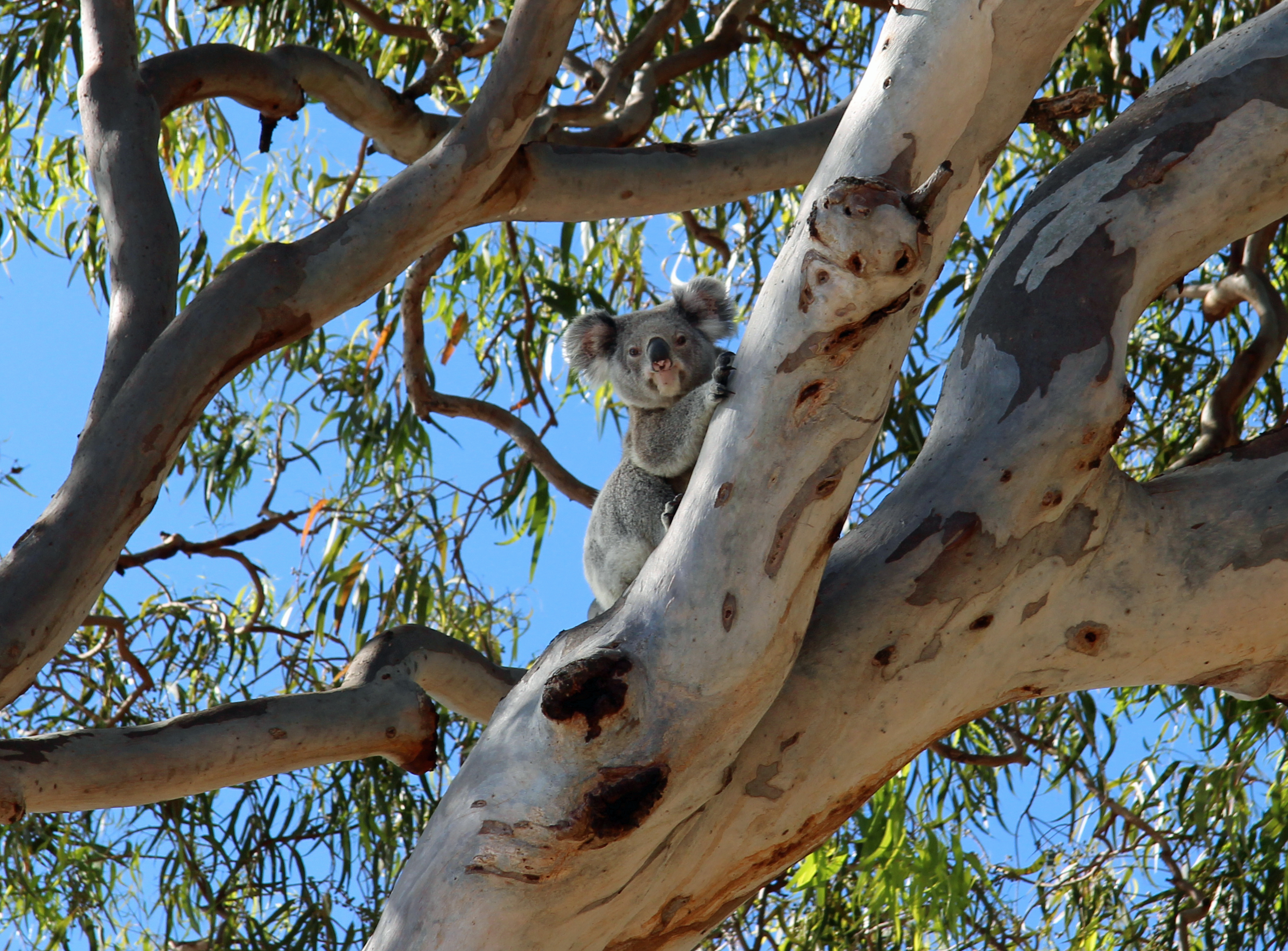
Koala in a eucalyptus tree at Cabarita Park, Amity (North Stradbroke Island)

Amity is surrounded by virgin forests to the south east and pristine beaches elsewhere.

=== Forests ===
The forests surrounding Amity are subtropical rainforests with a significant amount of diversity in both flora and fauna. This is despite the fact that North Stradbroke Island, along with Moreton Island to the north and South Stradbroke Island to the south, are made up entirely of sand, a substance that only a few, mostly monocotyledon plants have managed to survive in elsewhere in the world. The three islands also have species of ancient ferns that have survived only on these islands. The flowering rate of these ferns are very slow, and the trees are protected by Australian law so that only the Aboriginals, the original people of the island, may harvest them.

=== Beaches ===
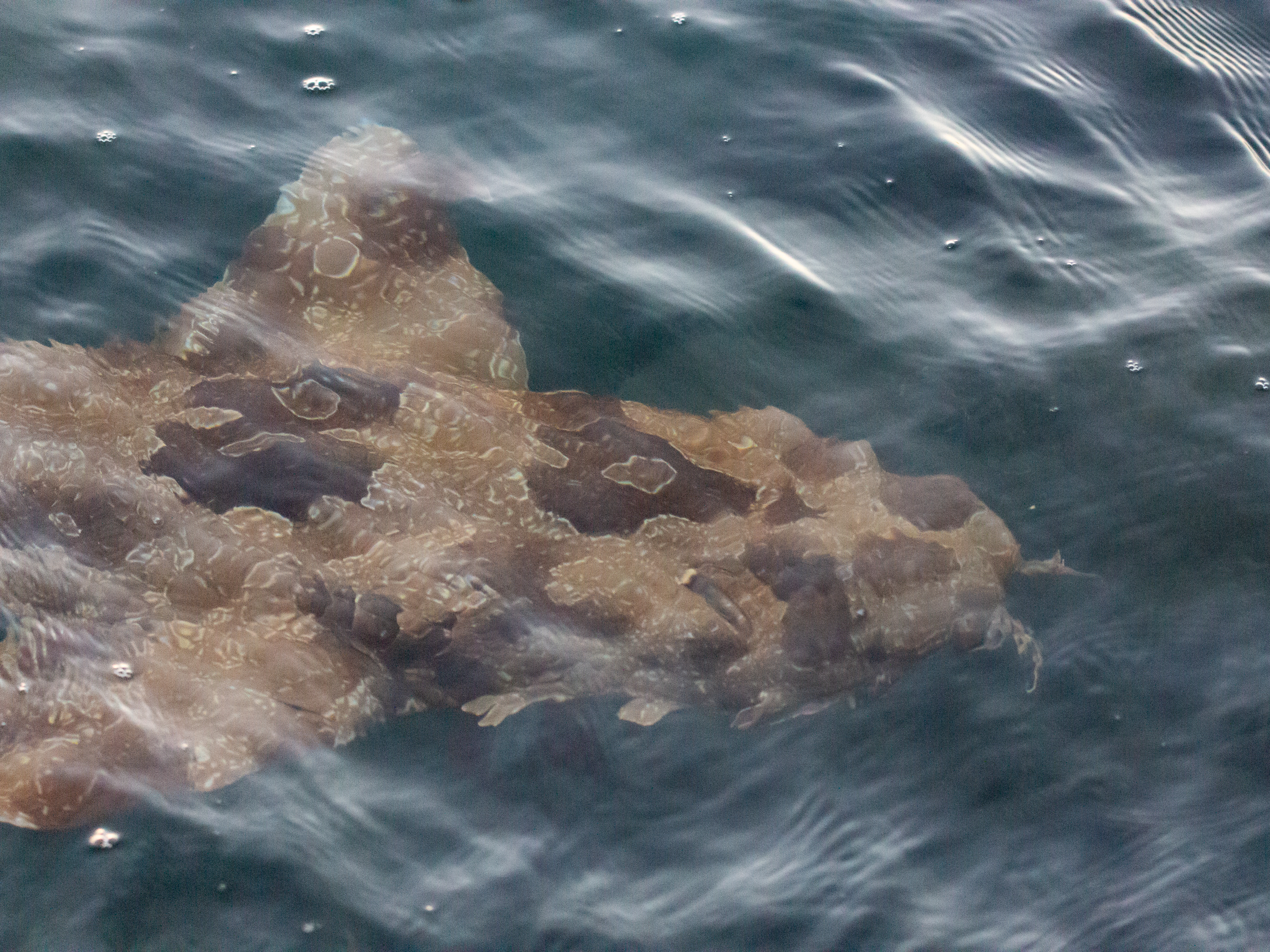
Wobbegong Shark, Amity Point, 2021

The beaches around Amity township have been eroded heavily by the rainbow channel, but Flinders Beach, 2–3 kilometres (1.2–1.9 mi) to the east, and the Wanga Wallen Bank approximately 500 m (1,640 ft) to the south are in pristine condition, with a range of wildlife from U-Tube worms to Wobbegongs, a small brown shark, all present.

Amity Point boasts some of the largest shark numbers in the world, though shark attacks are rare, with only one recorded fatal attack. Despite the presence of shark drumlines, in places since 1997, a Brisbane woman was mauled to death by sharks while swimming in Rainbow Channel. The species of shark remains unknown, with bull sharks suspected by an expert and tiger sharks suggested by locals.
