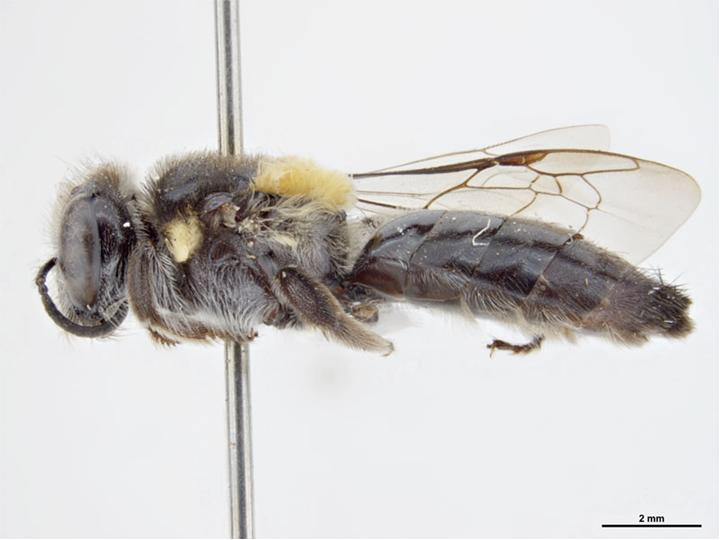
- Female

Scientific classification
- Kingdom: Animalia
- Phylum: Arthropoda
- Clade: Pancrustacea
- Class: Insecta
- Order: Hymenoptera
- Family: Colletidae
- Genus: Leioproctus
- Species: L. flavomaculatus

Binomial name
- Leioproctus flavomaculatus (Cockerell, 1905)

Synonyms
- Paracolletes flavomaculatus Cockerell, 1905

= Leioproctus flavomaculatus =

Species of bee

Leioproctus flavomaculatus, or Leioproctus (Exleycolletes) flavomaculatus, is a species of bee in the family Colletidae and subfamily Colletinae. It is endemic to Australia. It was described by British-American entomologist Theodore Dru Alison Cockerell in 1905.

== Distribution and habitat ==
The species occurs in eastern Australia. Published localities include Kuranda, Cairns and Stradbroke Island in Queensland.

== Behaviour ==
The adults are flying mellivores. Flowering plants visited by the bees include Eucalyptus species.
