= Jagera =

Jagera may refer to:

- Jagera people, an Aboriginal Australian people
- Jagera language, an Aboriginal Australian language
- Jagera (plant), a genus of trees

== See also ==
- Jagara (disambiguation)
