= Leioproctus saltus =

Scientific classification
- Kingdom: Animalia
- Phylum: Arthropoda
- Clade: Pancrustacea
- Class: Insecta
- Order: Hymenoptera
- Family: Colletidae
- Genus: Leioproctus
- Species: L. saltus

Binomial name
- Leioproctus saltus Maynard 2013

Species of bee

Leioproctus saltus, or Leioproctus (Charicolletes) saltus, is a species of bee in the family Colletidae and subfamily Colletinae. It is endemic to Australia. It was described by Australian entomologist Glynn Maynard in 2013.

== Etymology ==
The specific epithet saltus (Latin: "leap" or "dance") is a behavioural reference to the males dancing from flower to flower.

== Description ==
Female body length is about 8 mm, male body length 6 mm. Integumental colouration is mainly black. The hair is mostly white.

== Distribution and habitat ==
The species occurs in eastern Australia. The type locality is Stradbroke Island in south-east Queensland.

== Behaviour ==
The adults are flying mellivores. Flowering plants visited by the bees include Leucopogon species.
