= Myora Mission =

Aboriginal reserve on Stradbroke Island

Myora Mission was established as a mission station in 1892 in the Colony of Queensland, at Moongalba, a few kilometres north of Dunwich on Minjerribah (Stradbroke Island). It became an Aboriginal reserve and "industrial and reform school", its residents being used as a source of cheap labour before it eventually closed in 1943.

== History ==
=== Moongalba ===
The location of the mission was at Moongalba, a traditional Nunukul site of residence, where a natural fresh water spring arises close to the coast. The area is known for its ecological abundance and is an excellent source of drinkable water and variety of food sources. Large shell middens located there are evidence of long term semi-permanent occupation by the Indigenous people. The British called the place Myora Springs or just Myora.

=== 1843 Catholic mission ===
An earlier mission was established at Moongalba by Passionist priests under Archbishop Polding in 1843, but their attempts failed and they left the island not long afterwards.

=== Establishment of the Myora Mission in 1892 ===
The Queensland Aboriginal Protection Association established the mission on the island in October 1892, after an area of 20 hectares (49 acres) was reserved for a mission station at Moongalba, just north of Dunwich on what is now North Stradbroke Island. The mission had originally been operating on Bribie Island since 1890, but the authorities decided to transfer it to Moongalba.

On the 26 November 1892, Myora Mission was proclaimed a "Reserve for Mission", signed by Queen Victoria. "Assimilation through institutionalisation" began from October 1893, with the staff enforcing European cultural practices and values. The Mission was declared an "industrial and reformatory school" and a Mission Superintendent and Mission Matron were appointed by QAPA, but paid by the Queensland Government.

Most of the inmates of the mission were children who had been involuntarily brought to Myora from other reserves around the colony. They were housed in two dormitories, one for the boys and the other for the girls. The older boys and girls were trained to be "made useful and profitable to the mission and to society", and punished if they transgressed.

Initially, the local Indigenous Quandamooka people lived separate from the Aboriginal people brought into Myora by taking up residency at a place called One Mile which was between Moongalba and Dunwich.

=== The beating to death of an Aboriginal child in 1896 ===
In September 1896, a forcibly removed four year old Indigenous child at Myora named Cassey, was beaten to death by the Danish matron of the institution, Marie Christensen. She was subsequently charged with manslaughter and was sentenced to two years hard labour at the Toowoomba Gaol. However, the sentence was suspended on condition that the defendant would enter a good behaviour bond of £100. This was partly because in the doctor's opinion, the child was neglected and emaciated, and the blows struck by Christensen could not alone have been responsible for Cassey's death. Key incriminating evidence given by an Aboriginal woman was left out of the proceedings.

BBC Radio 4 presenter Lucy Worsley, with the assistance of local Aboriginal woman Vanessa Turnbull Roberts, produced a podcast episode in the series Lady Killers with Lucy Worsley chronicling and reflecting on the injustices of the incident. The episode was made with the help of the Minjerribah Moorgumpin Elders-In-Council and North Stradbroke Island Museum on Minjerribah.

The killing of Cassey led to the dormitories being closed, and the children at Myora being classified as orphans and removed to Deebing Creek Mission, near Ipswich.

=== Aboriginal reserve from 1896 ===
Myora was then re-proclaimed a "Reserve for the use of the Aboriginal Inhabitants of the State" changing its official status from mission to Aboriginal reserve. The reserve came under the control of four Chief Protectors of Aborigines between 1897 (the year of the Aboriginals Protection and Restriction of the Sale of Opium Act 1897) and 1940.

The school at Myora remained opened and the children of the local Quandamooka people became the attendees. Some Quandamooka people also moved into the area from the One Mile fringe camp. At this stage, it was still forbidden for Aboriginal people to live at Dunwich.

By 1905, there were about 48 permanent residents at Myora (Moongalba), including five South Pacific Islander men married to local women. The residents were used as cheap or free labour at the Dunwich Benevolent Asylum. Other residents worked at the nearby fish cannery, or the abattoir or for the Moreton Bay Oyster Company. They also worked as nursing assistants, domestic servants and fishermen on the island.

In 1904, a school at Dunwich was opened for the white residents of that town. However, Aboriginal children were eventually able to attend and by 1924 they accounted for over half the enrolments.

=== Closure in 1943 ===
The Myora reserve and school closed in 1943 with the residents continuing to live either at Myora or One Mile. In 1947 the Benevolent Institution was relocated to Sandgate, taking all of its amenities and opportunities for employment for the Aboriginal people. However, in 1950, sand mining companies started operating in the area and Indigenous people were able to find employment and were gradually allowed to live at Dunwich. By 1966, most Aboriginal families had either moved off the island or to Dunwich, with only a few people remaining at Myora and One Mile.
