= Pimpama language =

Indigenous language of Australia

Pimpama
- Native to: Australia
- Region: Queensland
- Era: attested
- Language family: Pama–Nyungan: Bandjalangic? Durubalic?; Guwar–Pimpama ?; Pimpama

Language codes
- ISO 639-3: None (mis)
- Glottolog: pimp1234

Pimpama is an indigenous language of Australia. The language was spoken on the coast near modern-day Brisbane. Along with Gowar, it may have been related to the Bandjalangic languages.
