= Deebing Creek Mission =

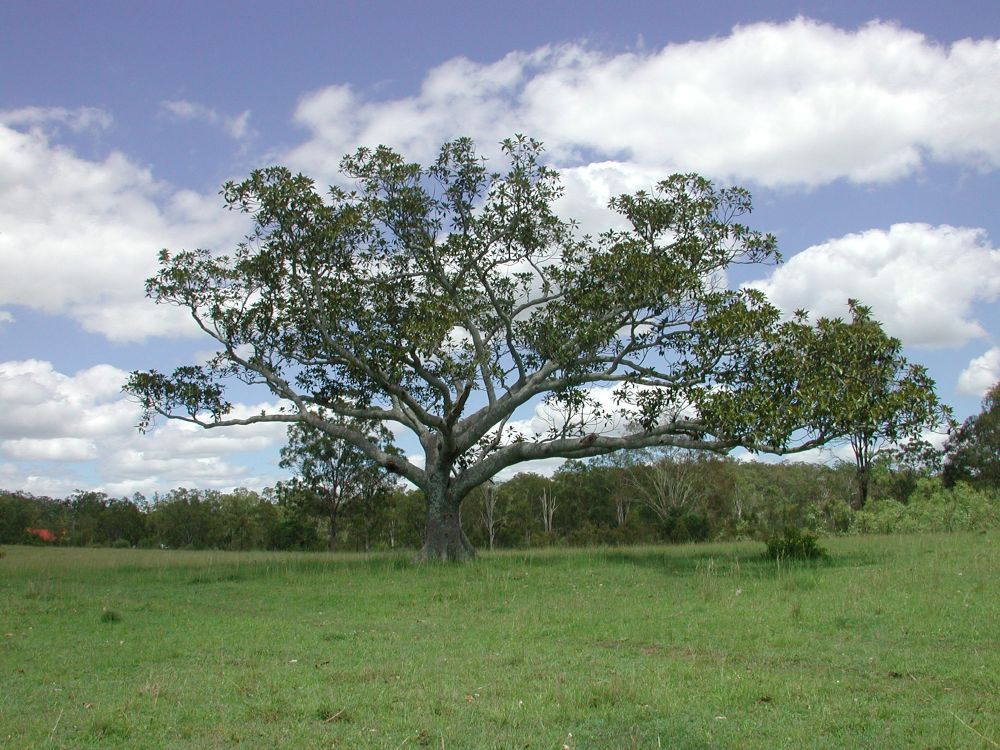
- Former Deebing Creek Mission, 2004

- Location within Queensland Location within Australia
- 27.6842°S 152.7642°E
- Location: Grampian Drive, Deebing Heights, City of Ipswich, Queensland, Australia

History
- Design period: 1870s - 1890s (late 19th century)
- Built: c. 1887 - c. 1915

Queensland Heritage Register
- Official name: Deebing Creek Mission (former), Deebing Creek Aboriginal Home, Deebing Creek Aboriginal Mission, Deebing Creek Aboriginal Reserve
- Type: state heritage (archaeological, landscape)
- Designated: 24 September 2004
- Reference no.: 602251
- Significant period: 1880s-1915 (historical)
- Significant components: tank - water, trees/plantings, terracing, cemetery

Deebing Creek Mission is a heritage-listed former Aboriginal reserve at South Deebing Creek Road (now Grampian Drive), Deebing Heights, City of Ipswich, Queensland, Australia. Considered a sacred site for the Yuggera and Jagera tribes. It was built from c. 1887 to c. 1915. It is also known as Deebing Creek Aboriginal Home, Deebing Creek Aboriginal Mission, and Deebing Creek Aboriginal Reserve. It was added to the Queensland Heritage Register on 24 September 2004.

== History ==
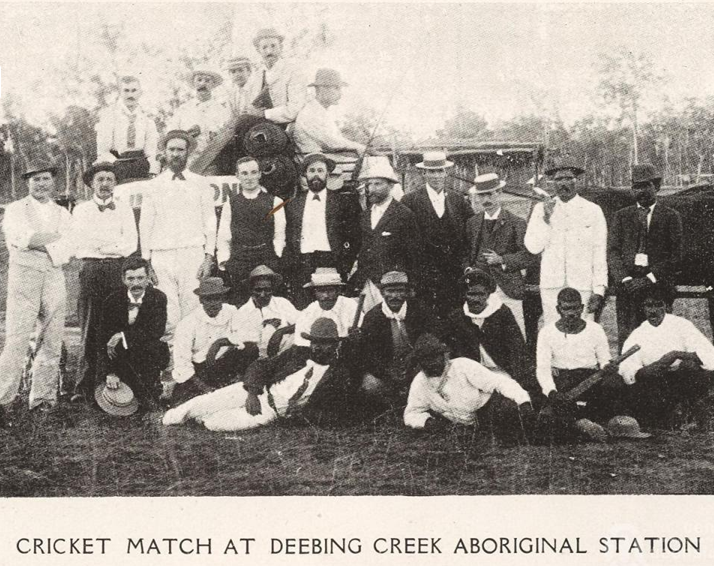
Cricket match at Deebing Creek Aboriginal Station

=== Establishment, 1892 ===
Deebing Creek Mission comprised areas of land which were gazetted for Aboriginal purposes from 1892 to 1948. The first area of land to be gazetted was R. 177 situated at what is now known as Lot 219 RP858789. This area does not appear to have been used as a place of residence, but from about 1900 it was used as a farm to support the Mission. Two further portions of land were gazetted as Aboriginal Reserves in 1892, the first in lieu of a Water Reserve, and the second nearby on the west bank of Deebing Creek. This area, with the proclamation of additional land, became what is known as the Deebing Creek Mission and a place of residence and work for missionaries and Aborigines until 1915. This Mission was transferred to Purga in 1915, although the Deebing Creek Mission land, remained an Aboriginal Reserve and was used for grazing purposes. Purga Mission was closed in June 1948 and all the reserves were rescinded in December 1948.

Around 1887 the Aboriginal Protection Association of Ipswich (Note: It is not known whether this group had any connection with the Queensland Aboriginal Protection Association (QAPA), but it appears that it was a local group.) commenced work on the establishment of a mission at Deebing Creek. It is not clear from the records if a specific religious denomination had responsibility for the Mission, although it is understood that the Reverend Peter Robertson, Chairman of the Aboriginal Protection Association, was a minister of the Presbyterian Church. The Aboriginal Protection Association, comprising Reverend Peter Robertson and local business figures William Foote, George Thorn and John Greenham formed with philanthropic and economic motives to establish a Mission. The Committee had sole authority to run the Mission from 1892 to 1897. At the time of establishment there were two known groups of Aborigines in the Ipswich area. The first were camped in Queen's Park in Ipswich and the second at Purga. It is thought that a combination of the two groups were the core of the first residents at the Deebing Creek Mission.

The Statistical Returns for Deebing Creek School No. 612 (the Mission school) for 1900 state that all of the children attending the school belonged to the Salvation Army, but this may have come about because the Superintendent, Thomas Ivins, appointed in 1896 was a member of the Salvation Army. A report from the Chief Protector of Aborigines in 1906 states that the Deebing Creek Mission, situated 5 miles (8.0 km) from Ipswich, was controlled by a Board appointed by the Church authorities. However, the name of the Church has been blackened out in the report. It is evident, however, that the Aboriginal Protection Association, the term regularly used by the committee, managed the Deebing Creek Mission, but relied heavily on the Government to assist financially. The Committee saw this as a legitimate claim after the Deebing Creek Mission was asked to take orphan children and was proclaimed an Industrial School in 1896. The Industrial and Reformatory Schools Act of 1865, provided that Aboriginal and "half-caste" children under the age of fifteen could be brought before a bench of magistrates and ordered for detention at a relevant mission.

The Reverend Edward Fuller became the first manager of the Deebing Creek Mission. From February 1892 he was thought to have lived in a tent for a year, after which he and his family lived in an architect designed house overlooking the bark huts of the Aborigines along Deebing Creek. It is not stated where this was situated, but it may have been on R. 371, the area gazetted in lieu of a water reserve in April 1892. The mission was supplied with provisions by the Government from February 1891 to February 1894 when a grant of £250 per annum was authorised. This continued until 1896.

In July 1892 a deputation from the committee of the Ipswich Aboriginal Protection Association requested that the land already granted to the home be vested in trustees and that a small additional area of land be granted in the immediate locality for the purposes of the Mission. This occurred on 29 October 1892, with the gazettal of a temporary Reserve for the use of the Aboriginals of 41 acres (17 ha) adjacent to Deebing Creek. This description aligns it to the east of portion 197, and is denoted on the survey plan as R. 65, a part of which is now Lot 228 on CC2905, an Aboriginal Cemetery Reserve. Trustees of the Aboriginal Protection Association were appointed.

When Myora Mission ceased to be a school around 1896, the dormitories were closed, and the children classified as orphans and removed to Deebing Creek Mission, without provisions and given a penny a day allowed for food.

The first record of the number of Aboriginal residents at the Mission appeared in correspondence of 1893, which indicated that there were 33 people. The numbers varied as some went away to work and returned at other periods. Prior to the Aboriginals Protection and Restriction of the Sale of Opium Act 1897, the Aboriginal people of Deebing Creek Mission were free to come and go as they pleased. There were only two Aboriginal workers on the Mission at that time.

=== The Act, 1897 ===
With the passage of the Aboriginal Protection and Restriction of the Sale of Opium Act 1897, the lives of Aboriginal people became increasingly controlled by the State. This Act was described as being passed "to make Provision for the better Protection and Care of the Aboriginal and half-caste Inhabitants of the Colony, and to make more effectual Provision for Restricting the Sale and Distribution of Opium". The Act established the positions of Protectors of Aborigines who administered the Act, and to whom a report was provided each year on each Mission and government settlement. It also provided for the establishment of government-run reserves, made provision for the removal of Aborigines to reserves, and provided for written agreements for the employment of Aborigines. The Act provided Regulations to control the residence, movement, employment and wages, in effect, every aspect of an Aborigine's life. The Act also expanded official control over mixed-race families. This control, of course, extended to the residents of the Deebing Creek Mission after 1897, especially in relation to agreements for employment outside the Mission.

Both children and adults were sent to Deebing Creek Mission from all over the State, from north Queensland as far west as Charleville. Aboriginal people who were sent to reserves away from their traditional lands are known as "historical" people. The reserves which became their homes were the traditional lands of other groups, but the State authorities did not take this cultural aspect into account in removing people from place to place. Nonetheless the reserves, such as Deebing Creek Mission, became "home" to those who were sent there by the Aboriginal Protectors. This has caused great difficulties for Aboriginal Peoples.

A typescript report, probably from Archibald Meston in 1896, stated that the Deebing Creek Mission provided a home and food in varying numbers for up to 150 people. He commented that the children received a plain public school education, and that the Aborigines provided labour for clearing, fencing and cultivation on the land that was suitable. Evidence from Meston's official report of 1896 indicates that the Mission consisted of a Mission house, buildings at the head of the creek and housing for Aborigines which Meston considered were too close together.

A short history of the school dated 30 January 1894 verifies that work began at the Mission in 1887 by the then present committee of the Aboriginal Protection Association. In 1894 there were 62 Aborigines at the Station and 27 attending school. An amount of £20/6/8 per month was received from the Government. J Fitzgerald was the teacher and Superintendent. At this stage a tent was being used as a school-room. Each adult male was required to work on the Mission for four hours each day and each family was encouraged to build their own dwelling. By 1897 the land had been fenced off into three portions and the houses and gardens had been fenced off from a common area. Thirteen cottages had been erected.

A report dated 5 September 1894 from the Police Magistrate to the Under Secretary, Colonial Secretary's Office, states that there had been clearing of timber at Deebing Creek Mission and substantial two-railed fencing erected. Two new huts were in evidence and another one was being built. There were about twenty children at the school. It was reported that the land was poor and that 12 young men were doing fencing and clearing.

Evidence that a school had been established by 1895 is also located in the Register of Purga Aboriginal School (formerly Deebing Creek) which shows the name, residence and admission age of children from 21 January 1895. Twenty-five names appear on the admission register for 1895. Thereafter the numbers ranged from 3 to 20 until the school was relocated to Purga Mission site in 1915. On 4 September 1895 correspondence indicates that there were new cottages, and that a tent that had been used as a school-room had been replaced by a new building to accommodate 80 people. There was at this time mention of the game of cricket being played.

A report dated December 1895 on the material organisation of Deebing Creek Provisional School shows that the school was a rough slab building, canvas lined, and with shingles, being 36 feet (11 m) long, 13 feet (4.0 m) wide with a semi partition about 10 feet (3.0 m) from the entrance. It was close to the Superintendent's quarters. Another hardwood building, 38 by 12 feet (11.6 by 3.7 m), to accommodate children being sent was thought not to be required, in which case it was to be converted to a school room.

The only evidence of the location of the school in the Deebing Creek area appears on the original plan. This plan indicates that the school was situated on R. 371, the area of land granted in lieu of the water reserve. A report of 1931 states that the school was erected on the south-west corner of the portion. In 1905 the Secretary of the Aboriginal Protection Association reported to Dr Walter Roth, Chief protector of Aborigines, that the portion on which the farm was situated was R. 371 and the house was on the west and the farm on the east end.

Correspondence from the Chief Protector of Aborigines to the Home Secretary on 1 February 1907 provides an indication of how the Industrial and Reformatory Schools Act 1865 was administered. The Chief Protector stated that the Government was pleased to remit the unexpired portions of the sentences of detention passed upon the undermentioned Industrial School children: Paddy, Jacky and Chloe - sentenced by the Bench of Magistrates, Roma on 7 June 1904, upon conviction on charges of being neglected children, to detention in the Deebing Creek Industrial School for seven years.

On 21 November 1896 the Government established, under the Industrial and Reformatory Schools Act 1865, an Industrial School at the Deebing Creek Mission, near Ipswich, to be known as the Deebing Creek Industrial School. The gazettal notice included the appointment of Thomas Ivins and Charlotte Emily Ivins as Superintendent and Matron respectively. The grant of £250, authorised in March 1894, was continued until June 1896, at which time a grant of £50 was given to assist in building rooms for orphan children. In 1896 the Reverend Peter Robertson, chairman of the Aboriginal Protection Association, requested and was granted funding for building and to purchase more land. In 1902 it was reported that the Mission received 3s. 6d. weekly for each child committed there under the Industrial and Reformatory Schools Act 1865. At that time there were twenty-three committed children.

The Statistical Returns for Deebing Creek School from 1895 to 1923 indicate that the name of the first school was Deebing Creek Provisional School, No. 612. The school retained this number when it became the Purga Aboriginal School. The building was thought to have been removed to the Purga Creek site in 1915.

After the passing of the 1897 Act, regular reports were submitted to the Parliament from the Northern and Southern Protector of Aborigines until 1904 when the positions of Northern and Southern Protector were amalgamated to the position of Chief Protector. Although the Aboriginal Protection Association was managing the Mission at this time, it was apparent that the Committee or the Superintendent provided a report to the Protector each year. These reports provide some indication of the number of Aborigines who were admitted or attended the school and the number residents at the Mission. The numbers varied at Deebing Creek Mission largely because of the itinerant work that occupied Aboriginal people outside the Mission. From 1896 the numbers resident show a high of 150 that year to a low of around 54 in 1913. Similarly the school admission register shows a high of 21 admissions in 1896 and a low of one admission in 1910, but these figures are sometimes at variance with those shown in the Chief Protector's Report.

On 20 November 1896 the Aboriginal Protection Association notified the Government that they had bought adjoining land to prevent new houses being built too close together along Deebing Creek, and requested £100 towards the cost. This was probably the additional 110 acres (45 ha) of land purchased by the committee from Joseph Gutteridge, but in May 1897 it was decided to convey the land to the Government rather than have it vested in trustees. The annual grant was increased to £550. The additional land was stated as being portion 197 of 57 acres (23 ha) and portion 204 of 53 acres (21 ha), adjacent to R. 65 which had been gazetted as an Aboriginal Reserve on 29 October 1892.

Meston was not the only person to complain about the unsuitable locality of the Deebing Creek Mission, especially in relation to the absence of fertile land, but also the proximity of the Mission to Ipswich and the availability of alcohol. The only fertile land available was the Nine Mile Reserve. During January and February 1901 there was a dispute over the use of the Nine Mile reserve, the Reserve for the Use of the Aborigines at Purga Creek. This was a part of the original land reserved in January 1892 for the use of Aborigines but had not been used, and no buildings had been erected by the mission because of threats by local residents. As the Mission grew it became necessary to utilise the land and the Aboriginal Protection Association decided a fence was required. Local residents petitioned against this as the Nine Mile was used for camping and water for stock. The dispute led to a deputation asking that the Mission not continue fencing, a decision that was reversed by the Home Secretary. Letters to the Editor from both sides of the argument appeared in The Queenslander. The Reverend Robertson claimed that the Mission was not able to build a fence on a property they had owned for 9 years, and also that produce of cream and timber produced by the Mission was being boycotted. There were some vicious letters from the local constituency in the newspaper, one suggesting that an alternative piece of land be found for the Mission. Reverend Robertson stated that due to the Mission's increase the Committee had bought three farms at Deebing Creek and two at Purga.

=== 1904 improvements ===
Improvements to buildings and land were made and reported from time to time. In 1904 it was reported that improvements on the Mission property itself were made to the value of over £250, and in 1907 a 20,000 imperial gallons (91,000 L; 24,000 US gal) underground tank was to be constructed at Deebing Creek Mission to alleviate the poor water supply. The 1907 Protector's Report published a photograph of Deebing Creek Mission which shows about 8 homes in the background with numerous people in the foreground of the image. The Aboriginal people were interested in attending and competing in the footrace in Ipswich called the Sheffield Handicap. In 1907, for the purposes of the Aborigines attending the footrace, the operation of the 1897 to 1901 Act was suspended for same. This referred to the Aboriginals Protection and the Restriction of the Sale of Opium Act 1897 which controlled the movement of Aboriginal people outside the reserves; they were required to have a permit to travel. In 1909 it was reported that a new home had been erected beside the school for the committal children. The reports during this time also showed a gradual improvement in the farming operations, with an increase in stock and vegetable produce which supplied the Mission with meat, milk and vegetables, with some at times being sold to supplement the Mission's income.

The 1910 Protector's Report suggests that there was a marked improvement in the homes and life of those residents who had been the longest under the influence of the Mission. It was reported that the Aboriginal people made it a true home.

In 1912 two new homes were built at Deebing Creek Mission and improvements made to others. It was stated that the Mission controlled about 2,072 acres (839 ha) of land, which including 200 acres (81 ha) at Deebing Creek.

In 1914 the Deebing Creek Mission was relocated to Purga. It is not stated clearly in the records exactly where the buildings from Deebing Creek Mission were relocated to and what improvements were made. The Government, who it is known was managing the area in 1920 when the Salvation Army took over, may have taken over management of Deebing Creek Mission around 1914.

=== Abandonment of the mission, c.1915 ===
In correspondence on 18 December 1914, the Reverend Robertson requested payment to assist the removal of buildings from Deebing Creek Mission to Purga. The letter stated that for 25 years "we" have been in charge of the Mission and have spent every year more money on food and clothing for the people than received from the Government. The Aboriginal Protection Association had concerns regarding the paying of their accounts. From this time the Reverend Robertson is not mentioned in reports or correspondence and the Committee is mentioned in the 1914 Protector's Report for the last time. Although the records are not clear on this point, it appears that the Aboriginal Protection Association of Ipswich may have decided to abandon the management of the Mission after it moved to Purga.

== Subsequent use of the land ==
It is apparent from documents in relation to the prickly pear infestation at Deebing Creek in 1929 that the Mission there was not occupied, but under the control of the Salvation Army and John Bleakley, Chief Protector. The document refers to the Salvation Army Aboriginal Colony. In 1931 a report by the Ranger in relation to the proposed opening up the Deebing Creek Mission area for selection stated that a school had been erected on the south west corner of portion 204.

The 1934 Report of the Aboriginal Department indicated that the farm had been subdivided, and a considerable amount of ring barking and suckering had been carried out at Deebing Creek.

In 1967 some Ipswich Aboriginal people, under the leadership of Les Davidson, petitioned the Queensland Premier requesting that their burial grounds, bora rings, cave paintings and any cemetery excavations be preserved as are European burial grounds. This letter identified two burial grounds, one at Deebing Creek Mission and one at Purga.

Undated newspaper clippings from 1974 to 1975 gave publicity to the request of the Aboriginal people, whose ancestors were buried at Deebing Creek Mission, for their land to be returned. Davidson also enlisted the assistance of Senator Jim Cavanagh to have the land of their forefathers returned. Davidson said that Aborigines who were born at Deebing Creek Mission included people from around Ipswich, Cherbourg, Brisbane, Beaudesert and country areas.

On 21 February 1976 land was gazetted for the resumption of an area of 3,600 square metres being part of Agricultural Farm No. 7869, Lot 218 CC2906, for Aboriginal Cemetery purposes. At the same time an easement was proclaimed, which was resumed from the same Lot. This was surveyed on 25 June 1975 and is currently gazetted as Lot 228 CC2905. The Cemetery Reserve, Lot 228 CC2905, is situated on the west bank of Deebing Creek, which was a part of the original Aboriginal Reserve, R. 65.

During 1977 there was correspondence in relation to compensation for the owners of the land from which the resumption was executed. There was also discussion relating to access for visitors to the reserve. It appeared that access to the Cemetery was to be controlled by the Lands Department for the purpose of clearing the area and repairing headstones until the matter of compensation was finalised.

From 1978 to 1980 there is correspondence in relation to requests from William Thorpe for access to land records for his personal research. One of the letters from the Department of Aboriginal and Islander Advancement to Thorpe indicates that the Department was undertaking research to ascertain the names and burial places of the original residents of Deebing Creek Mission. Other papers indicate that there was a proposed submission to the Aboriginal Development Commission to obtain several hundred acres of land at Deebing Creek.

On 23 November 1985 an Order in Council of 21 November 1985 rescinded the proclamation of a portion of land of 55.847 hectares (138.00 acres) in the Ipswich Land Agent's District, parish of Purga (Churchill) which had been proclaimed for Public Purposes on 25 August 1886 and gazetted on 28 August 1886. The area of about 138 acres (56 ha) aligned largely with the Aboriginal Reserve R. 177 proclaimed on 2 January 1892 that was reduced in size in the re-gazettal in 1901.

== Description ==
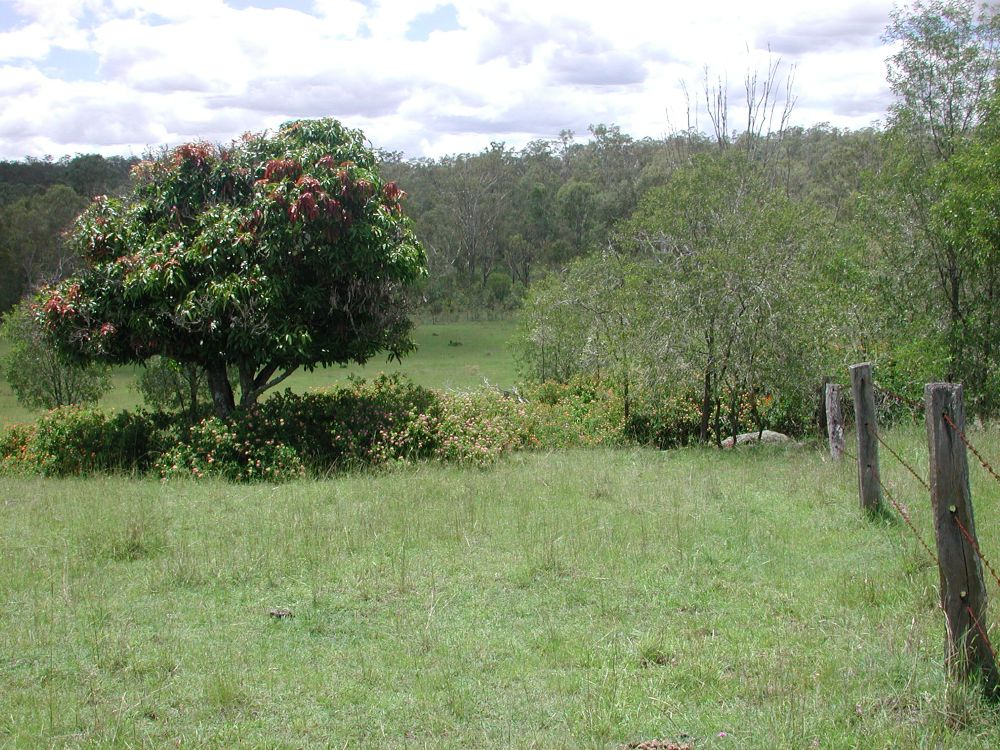
Mango tree, former Deebing Creek Mission

Located approximately 8 kilometres (5.0 mi) south of Ipswich City, access to the site of Deebing Creek Mission is from the Cunningham Highway and at the end of South Deebing Creek Road.

Historic plantings at the site include a large bunya pine tree. Other historic plantings include two large fig trees, a mango tree and a date palm.

The 1907, 20,000 imperial gallons (91,000 L; 24,000 US gal) underground brick tank constructed at the Deebing Creek Mission to alleviate the poor water supply remains in situ. This underground tank is now screened by thick vegetation on three sides and has an old fence around it. The tank has been used as a rubbish dump and has numerous car tyres in it.

Evidence of terracing remains at the site near the southern boundary fence as the land falls away to Deebing Creek. A large stone on which the children of the school sharpened their lead pencil has also been reported at the site in proximity to the terracing and water tank.

A single headstone was erected at the Cemetery dedicated to Julia Ford who died in 1896. However oral evidence from John Lynch and Les Davidson, and a 1975 report by J. Skinner, Land Inspector to the Land Administration Commission indicate that there were as many as 13 additional burials at the Cemetery. This is substantiated by a newspaper article of 1892 stating that two people had died at the Mission that year and were buried at the nearby Cemetery. The remains of several stone cairns thought to mark the locations of some of the additional grave are also present at the Cemetery.

There are two old huts on the land dating to the Second World War which do not relate to the Mission period. Local Indigenous families squatted in the huts during the 1950s-1960s.

There is a high level of archaeological potential at the Deebing Creek Mission site. Inspection by officers of the Environmental Protection Agency and traditional owners revealed a possible location for the Deebing Creek Mission school site and Superintendent's residence including the presence of ceramics, old bottles, glass and a harmonica. Additionally, it is known that Aboriginal residents constructed housing along the banks of Deebing Creek. Published reports state that each house was made of timber with up to four partitions, dirt floors and concrete steps leading from the back of the house towards the banks of Deebing Creek.

== Heritage listing ==
The former Deebing Creek Mission was listed on the Queensland Heritage Register on 24 September 2004 having satisfied the following criteria.

The place is important in demonstrating the evolution or pattern of Queensland's history.

Deebing Creek Mission is important in illustrating the pattern of Queensland's history as it was an institution created to house, utilise labour and control the movement of Aboriginal people in the latter part of the 1800s until its closure in 1915 when the Mission was moved to Purga.

The place has potential to yield information that will contribute to an understanding of Queensland's history.

The intactness of an underground water facility, historic plantings, and the cemetery at Deebing Creek Mission have the potential to reveal further information about 19th and 20th century life and burial practices at an institutionalised Mission.

The place has a strong or special association with a particular community or cultural group for social, cultural or spiritual reasons.

Deebing Creek Mission has a strong association with the Indigenous community as evidence of the impact of a major historic event. The Mission is of great significance to the traditional Aboriginal people of that area, and also to others known as "historical people" who were sent to live at the Mission from 1892 to 1915. The Cemetery is a significant burial ground for Aboriginal people in the area relating to Mission times.
