= Queensland Aboriginal Protection Association =

Former state government agency for the maintenance of Aboriginal lands

The Queensland Aboriginal Protection Association (QAPA) was responsible for the creation of various mission stations or Aboriginal reserves in Queensland, Australia, in the late nineteenth century.

== Aims ==
While they were concerned with the welfare of Australian Aboriginal people, they thought that the people needed to be changed to learn and adopt European values, in a form of cultural assimilation.

== History ==
=== Two local precedents ===
In 1887, the "Aboriginal Protection Association of Ipswich" (a local organisation) commenced work on the establishment of the Deebing Creek Mission. In 1889, the Secretary of the "Townsville Aboriginal Protection Association" proposed to the Colonial Secretary that an Aboriginal reserve be created on Great Palm Island. However it is not known if either had any link with QAPA.

=== Founding of QAPA ===
The inaugural meeting of QAPA was held in Brisbane. In 1890, the Association established a mission on Bribie Island, off the coast near Brisbane, at the northwestern end of Moreton Bay. A school and provision for 20 residents living in dormitories was established. QAPA suffered financial difficulties on Bribie, with the Colonial Secretary, Horace Tozer, refusing to pay their creditors in September 1892. The Association turned their attention to Stradbroke Island, then one island and known as Minjerribah by the local Aboriginal people. In October 1892, an area of 20 hectares (49 acres) was reserved for a mission station at Moongalba, near the northern tip of what is now North Stradbroke Island, and Myora Mission was created.

=== Myora Mission ===
On 26 November 1892, Myora Mission was proclaimed a "Reserve for Mission", signed by Queen Victoria. "Assimilation through institutionalisation" began in October 1893, with the staff enforcing European cultural practices and values. The Mission was declared an "industrial and reformatory school" and a Mission Superintendent and Mission Matron was appointed by QAPA, but paid by the Queensland Government. The mission later ceased to be a school, the dormitories were closed, and the children classified as orphans and removed to Deebing Creek Mission. It was then re-proclaimed a "Reserve for the use of the Aboriginal Inhabitants of the State", changing its official status to Aboriginal reserve, coming under the control of the Chief Protector of Aborigines.
