= Jagara, Assam =

Village in Assam, India

Jagara Jagra
- Village
- Location in Assam, India Jagara (India)
- Coordinates: 26.3626°N 91.3831°E
- Country: India
- State: Assam
- District: Nalbari

Area
  - Total: 578.59 ha (1,429.7 acres)

Population (2011)
  - Total: 6,842
  - Density: 1,183/km^{2} (3,063/sq mi)

Languages
  - Official: Assamese
- Time zone: UTC+5:30 (IST)
- PIN: 781310
- Telephone code: 03624
- ISO 3166 code: IN-AS
- Vehicle registration: AS-14
- Website: nalbari.gov.in

Jagara, commonly known as Jagra, is a census village in Nalbari district, Assam, India. According to the 2011 Census of India, Jagra has a total population of 6,842 people, including 3,586 males and 3,256 females.

Like other places in North-east India, the village also carries a history of militancy.
