= Queensland Review =

Australian academic journal

- Discipline: Australian studies
- Language: English

Publication details
- History: 1994–present
- Publisher: Equinox Publishing

Standard abbreviations
- ISO 4: Qld. Rev.

Indexing
- ISSN: 1321-8166

Links
- Journal homepage

The Queensland Review is a peer-reviewed academic journal of Queensland studies published by Equinox Publishing, having been formerly published by Cambridge University Press. Established in 1994, it publishes articles, interviews and commentaries on Queensland history, politics and culture. The editor-in-chief is Michael T. Davis (Griffith University).
