= Packson Ngugi =

Kenyan actor

- Occupation: actor

Packson Ngugi is a Kenyan actor. He has played roles in plays and movies, and appeared in Kenyan TV commercials. He hosted a TV show, Omo Pick A Box, in the late 1990s.

He played a mortuary attendant in the movie The Constant Gardener. He is the founder of Za kikwetu Productions ltd, a Casting Agency that also houses a Recording Studio for Radio commercials and documentaries.

In the mid 1990s, Ngugi joined actors like the late Joni Nderitu, Paul Onsongo and Ben Mutua Jonathan Muriithi (BMJ Muriithi), in holding demonstrations on the streets of Nairobi to protest the planned acquisition of Kenya National Theatre by the adjacent Norfolk Hotel, an action that made the Kenyan government rescind its decision.
