= Durubalic languages =

Family of Australian Aboriginal languages

Durubalic
- Geographic distribution: Queensland
- Linguistic classification: Pama–Nyungan: Southeast; New South Wales; Durubal–Bandjalang; Durubalic
- Subdivisions: Turrubal (Yagara); Janday †; Moondjan †; ?Gowar–Pimpama †

Language codes
- Glottolog: None yaga1256 Yagara-Jandai guwa1244 Guwar
- Durubalic languages (green) among other Pama–Nyungan (tan)

Durubalic is a small family of Australian Aboriginal languages of Queensland.

Bowern (2011) lists five Durubalic languages:

- Durubalic
    - Turrubal (Turubul)
    - Yagara (Jagara)
  - Jandai (Janday)
  - Nunukul (Nunungal, Moonjan)
  - Gowar (Guwar)

Dixon (2002) considers all but Guwar to be different dialects of the Yagara language. Tony Jefferies (2011) links Gowar to the Bandjalangic languages rather than to Durubalic.

Pimpama seems to be related to Gowar, whether they are in turn related Durubalic or to the Bandjalangic languages.
