= Goenpul =

Aboriginal Australian people

The Goenpul, also written Koenpal, are an Aboriginal Australian people, one of three Quandamooka peoples, who traditionally lived on the southern part of Stradbroke Island in southern Queensland. Today their preferred term for their group is Dandrubin Gorenpul.

== Name ==
In the Brisbane area tribal, the words for 'no' used by each tribe were often selected to form the appropriate ethnonym. Both djandai and goenpul used for the Goenpul reflect this principle of nomenclature. Djandai meant the language spoken by the Goenpul, while Goenpul itself was formed from the Moreton Island term for 'no', namely goa.

== Country ==
The Goenpul's traditional lands occupied some 100 square miles (260 km^{2}) on southern part of Stradbroke Island. On their northern boundary were the Nunukul. As one of the three tribes constituting the Quandamooka people, the others being the Nunukul and the Ngugi, they are custodians with traditional ownership rights in Moreton Bay.

== Alternative names ==
- Coobenpil
- Djandai
- Dsandai, Tchandi
- Jandai (djandai means = no)
- Jendairwal
- Jundai
- Noogoon (word for St. Helens Island)

Source: Tindale 1974, pp. 175–176

== Sources ==
- Ross, Anne; Sherman, Kathleen Pickering; Snodgrass, Jeffrey G; Delcore, Henry D; Sherman, Richard (2016). Indigenous Peoples and the Collaborative Stewardship of Nature: Knowledge Binds and Institutional Conflicts. Routledge. ISBN 978-1-315-42659-4.
- Tindale, Norman Barnett (1974). "Koenpal (QLD)". Aboriginal Tribes of Australia: Their Terrain, Environmental Controls, Distribution, Limits, and Proper Names. Australian National University Press. ISBN 978-0-708-10741-6.
