= Quandamooka people =

Aboriginal Australian people

- Location: Moreton Bay, Southeast Queensland
- Coordinates: 27°30′S 143°30′E

Notable people
- Oodgeroo Noonuccal; Leeanne Enoch; Aileen Moreton-Robinson

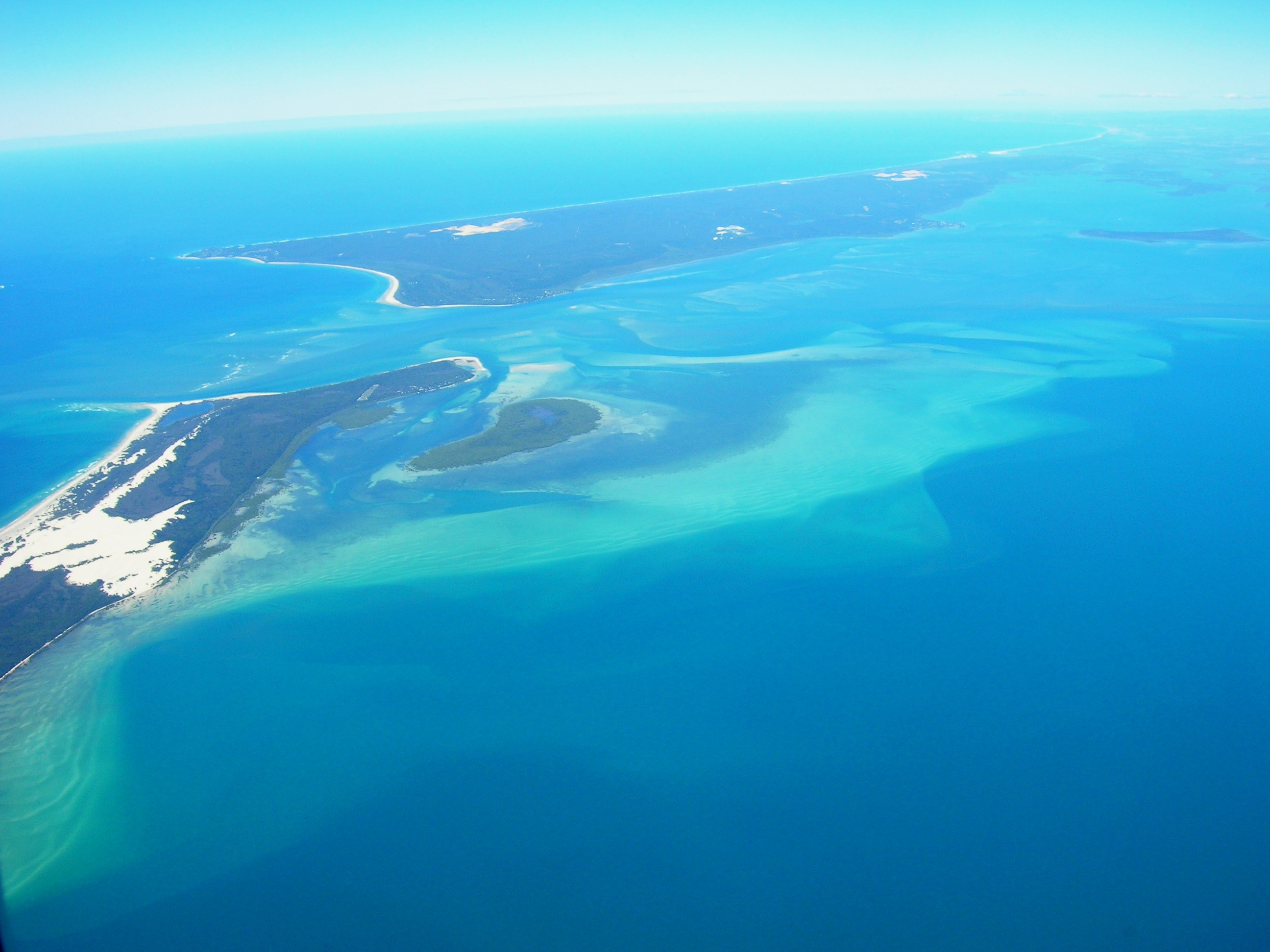
Moreton Bay, Moreton Island, Stradbroke Island and the rest of Redland Bay islands are the traditional homes of the Quandamooka people

The Quandamooka people are Aboriginal Australians who live around Moreton Bay in Southeastern Queensland. They are composed of three distinct tribes, the Nunukul, the Goenpul (Note: The Goenpul's contemporary descendants prefer the ethnonym Dandrubin Gorenpul (Ross et al. 2016, p. 4).) and the Ngugi, and they live primarily on Moreton and North Stradbroke Islands, that form the eastern side of the bay. Many were pushed out of their lands when the English colonial government established a penal colony near there in 1824. Each group has its own language. A number of local food sources are utilised by the tribes.

== Name ==
The term Quandamooka refers geographically to the southern Moreton Bay, the waters, islands and adjacent coastal areas of the mainland. The Nunukul and Goenpul tribes lived on Stradbroke Island, while the Ngugi tribe lived on Moreton Island. The Nunukul, Goenpul and Ngugi tribes together constitute the Quandamooka people.

== History ==
The archaeological remains of the Moreton Bay islands were studied intensively by V.V. Ponosov in the mid 1960s, and indigenous occupation of the islands seems to go back at least some 18,000 years BP.

The Quandamooka people first encountered Europeans in 1799, when the English navigator and cartographer Matthew Flinders passed several weeks exploring Moreton Bay. The Moreton Bay people occasionally took in and cared for English ticket-of-leave castaways, most notably Thomas Pamphlet, Richard Parsons and John Finnegan, whom the explorer John Oxley found when he sailed into the bay in 1823. The first settlement, a penal colony, was established the following year by Oxley at Redcliffe with 50 settlers, 20–30 of whom were convicts. (Note: Dutton, in 1983, 4 years before Hughes' book, writes of 20 convicts and 14 soldiers, plus an assortment of help and family (Dutton 1983, p. 96).) Contacts were scarce for over a decade, as no free settlers were allowed to enter within a 50 mile radius of the penal colony. In 1873 Gustavus Birch, a well educated recluse found solace in the company of the Quandamooka people having relinquished his life on the mainland, setting up camp at Pulan Pulan (Amity Point) staying for over 30 years. During that time he kept a diary of his life on the island recording in detail, every day – who visited the camp, the food they caught and foraged for, weather patterns and other significant events. Significantly he recorded many Aboriginal words and their local meaning, and clearly identified the men, women and children with whom he shared his reclusive life.

As free settlers began to move in, the indigenous peoples were pushed out of the more fertile lands into the coastal fringe, with many of them moving to the less occupied small islands. The three Quandamooka peoples each faced dispossession and the loss of their hunting and fishing grounds. The presence of settlers introduced a number of diseases that ravaged the islands and coastal areas. Forced displacements and the removal of children also had an impact. The indigenous people living on Stradbroke island were able to sustain their lifestyle for the longest period; however, in 1897 the Aboriginal Protection and Restriction of the sale of Opium Act moved all indigenous people to reservations, with the exception of those who were imprisoned or were employed as servants.

== Culture ==
=== Nomadism ===
The lifestyle of the Quandamooka people was semi-nomadic, moving between semi-permanent campsites. They built shelters of various kinds, ranging from simple lean-tos for an overnight stay to more robust huts used at well-frequented campsites. Their traditions were recorded in the form of art, songs, and dances.

=== Language ===
The three tribes that comprise the Quandamooka people spoke dialects of a Durubalic language. The language that the Goenpul tribe of central and southern Stradbroke Island speaks is Jandai, and the Nunukul dialect of northern Stradbroke island was called Moondjan, the term for its distinctive word for "no".

=== Food ===
The Quandamooka people used several local food sources, including many from the ocean. The collection of these resources was often segregated by gender. Canoes were used to fish in Moreton Bay for mullet, and to hunt dugongs and sea turtles. They were also used to travel to the mainland to hunt.

Hunting and fishing were male specialisations. Dugongs were highly prized catch, because of their multiple uses. The meat was roasted and eaten, while medicinal oil was also obtained from the animals. The men used several different techniques to catch fish. These included netting them from canoes using nets made of vines or bark, spearing them, and trapping them.

The collection of other sources of food was done by women. These included shellfish, fern roots, Pandanus trees, insect larvae, berries, lily bulbs, honey, and small game. The fern roots were roasted and pounded into flour, while the fleshy part of Pandanus trees were used to make a drink. The game animals consumed by the Quandamooka included lizards, snakes, waterbirds, and marsupials.

=== Art and tools ===
The Quandamooka people made several tools and weapons from materials found locally. These included boomerangs and shields, as well as dilly bags made from woven reeds. These tools were frequently decorated with patterns, which were either burned or painted. Tools and weapons were also occasionally traded with other nearby tribes.

== Native title ==
On 4 July 2011, the Quandamooka people were granted Native title to a 568-square-kilometre (219 sq mi) plot of land, following a 16-year legal battle. The title that was granted covered most of North Stradbroke Island, many smaller islands, and the adjoining parts of Moreton Bay. The title was the first granted to indigenous people in South Queensland.

== Prominent people ==
- Oodgeroo Noonuccal (born Kathleen Ruska; later Kath Walker, 1920–1993) was one of the most nationally prominent members of the Quandamooka people. She served as a wireless operator in the Australian Women's Army Service, and later became a poet.
  She was also a political activist, campaigning for Aboriginal rights. Oodgeroo was best known for her poetry, and was hailed as the first Aboriginal Australian to publish a book of verse.
- Leeanne Enoch, a Quandamooka of Nunukul-Nughi descent, is the Labor party member for the district of Algester in the Queensland assembly since 2015. She is the first Indigenous woman to be elected to the Parliament of Queensland and has held various ministerial positions.
- Wesley Enoch (born 1969) is an Australian playwright and artistic director of Murri descent from Stradbroke Island (Minjerribah). He is a Noonuccal Nuugi man and currently Artistic Director of the Sydney Festival.
- Lisa Bellear (2 May 1961 in Melbourne, Victoria – 5 July 2006 in Melbourne) was an Indigenous Australian poet, photographer, activist, spokeswoman, dramatist, comedian and broadcaster. Bellear was a broadcaster at the community radio station 3CR in Melbourne where she presented the show "Not Another Koori Show" for over 20 years.
- Bob Bellear also known as Robert William "Bob" Bellear (17 June 1944 – 15 March 2005) was an Australian social activist, lawyer and judge. Robert was the first Aboriginal Australian judge. His grandmother was an Aboriginal Australian woman from Minjerribah, married to a blackbirded Vanuatu man Jack Corowa.
- Megan Cope is a contemporary Indigenous Australian artist. Cope is a member of the Brisbane based Indigenous Art Collective ProppaNOW and was the winner of the Western Australian Indigenous Art Award 2015 for her video satire of Australian stereotypes over Indigenous inclusion The Blaktism.
- Lorraine Hatton, OAM (born 1966) is a Ngugi /Noonuccal Elder, of Minjerribah. Having served her country in the ADF for over 20 years, deploying on operations in various missions and conflicts,
  Lorraine achieved several firsts for females in the Army. Now in retirement she is an avid and widely recognised Ambassador of Community Capability Building, Youth Development and Cultural Awareness. Sitting on and chairing several Boards, focusing on Veterans and Community, she is a sought-after Key Note Speaker to a variety of Government, Corporate and Public organisations. She is highly regarded as an inspirational role model. Lorraine was Queensland's only female finalist for Australian of the year for 2019 and received the Medal of the Order of Australia (OAM) in 2019. Lorraine was appointed as the Indigenous Elder of the Australian Army in June 2020.
- Aileen Moreton-Robinson is an Australian academic, Indigenous feminist, author and activist for Indigenous rights. She is an Aboriginal woman of the Goenpul tribe, part of the Quandamooka nation on Stradbroke Island in Queensland. She was the first Aboriginal person to be appointed to a mainstream lecturing position in women's studies in Australia.
  She has held positions in women's studies at Flinders University and Indigenous studies at Griffith University and Queensland University of Technology. She is currently Dean, Indigenous Research and Engagement at the Queensland University of Technology and Director of the National Indigenous Research and Knowledges Network (NIRAKN). She completed a PhD at Griffith University in 1999, her thesis was titled Talkin' up to the white woman: Indigenous women and feminism in Australia. Her thesis was later published as a book in 1999.

== Sources ==
- "Australian Honours Lists". Governor-General of the Commonwealth of Australia.
- Brown, Jen Jewel (24 July 2006). "An inspiring, dynamic warrior woman". The Sydney Morning Herald.
- Collins, John (1994). "Obituary: Oodgeroo of the Tribe Noonuccal". Aboriginal History. 18 (1–2): 1–4. JSTOR 24046080.
- Connors, Libby (2015). Warrior: A legendary leader's dramatic life and violent death on the colonial frontier. Allen & Unwin. ISBN 978-1-760-11048-2.
- Diamond, Marion (July 2012). Stradbroke: A Brief History (PDF). Fryer Folios. pp. 1–4.
- Dixon, Robert M. W. (2002). Australian Languages: Their Nature and Development. Vol. 1. Cambridge University Press. ISBN 978-0-521-47378-1.
- Dutton, Tom (1983). "The origin and spread of Aboriginal Pidgin English in Queensland and: A Prelimionary Account" (PDF). Aboriginal History. 7 (1–2): 90–122.
- Fox, Karen (2011). Maori and Aboriginal Women in the Public Eye. ANU E Press. p. 106. ISBN 978-1-921-86262-5.
- Green, Antony (2 February 2015). "Algester". Australian Broadcasting Corporation.
- Hughes, Robert (2010) [First published 1987]. The Fatal Shore. Random House. pp. 440–450. ISBN 978-1-407-05407-0.
- Ivanitz, Michele (2000) [First published 1987]. "Local Government and Native Title Process Agreements in Australia and Canada: Ethical practice and shifting contexts". In Bishop, Patrick; Preston, Noel (eds.). Local Government, Public Enterprise and Ethics. Federation Press. pp. 79–101. ISBN 978-1-862-87135-9.
- "Leading Indigenous academic takes on new role with QUT". Koori Mail. 26 April 2006.
- "Local Indigenous Peoples". wynnummanly.com. Archived from the original on 28 February 2015.
- "Lorraine Hatton". Serving Country. n.d.
- "Lorraine Hatton Co-Chairs Committee for the Construction of First Indigenous and Torres Strait Islander State Memorial in Queensland". Corporate Protection Australia Group. 23 August 2017.
- "Army's second Indigenous Elder". Australian Army. n.d.
- Manning, Peter (17 March 2005). "From the depths to the heights". The Sydney Morning Herald.
- Moreton-Robinson, Aileen (1998). Talkin' up to the white woman: Indigenous women and feminism in Australia (PhD thesis). Griffith University Faculty of Arts – via Trove.
- Moreton-Robinson, Aileen (2000). Talkin' up to the white woman: aboriginal women and white feminism. University of Queensland Press. ISBN 978-0-7022-3134-6.
- Northover, Kylie (29 April 2014). "Artist Megan Cope takes a fresh look at the question of identity". The Sydney Morning Herald.
- O'Faircheallaigh, Ciaran (2015). Negotiations in the Indigenous World: Aboriginal Peoples and the Extractive Industry in Australia and Canada. Routledge. p. 125. ISBN 978-1-317-51153-3.
- Ponosov, Vladimir Vasil'evich (1974). Results of an archaeological survey of the Southern region of Moreton Bay and of Moreton Island (1963-1964) (PDF). University of Queensland. Archived from the original (PDF) on 16 January 2017.
- This Wikipedia article incorporates CC BY 4.0 licensed text from: "Diary of Gustavus Birch 1873-1874". John Oxley Library Blog. State Library of Queensland. 26 November 2020.
- "QSNTS - Quandamooka People". Qsnts.com.au. Archived from the original on 2 April 2015.
- "Quandamooka". Redland City Council. Archived from the original on 12 March 2012.
- "Quandamooka woman nominated as QLD Australia of the Year". Redland City Bulletin. 8 November 2018.
- Rainforth, Dylasn (15 July 2015). "WA Artist Megan Cope takes a fresh look at the question of identity". The Sydney Morning Herald.
- Robertson, Joshua (1 February 2015). "Leeanne Enoch's election in Queensland 'opens door' for Indigenous politicians". The Guardian.
- Ross, Anne; Sherman, Kathleen Pickering; Snodgrass, Jeffrey G; Delcore, Henry D; Sherman, Richard (2016). Indigenous Peoples and the Collaborative Stewardship of Nature: Knowledge Binds and Institutional Conflicts. Routledge. ISBN 978-1-315-42659-4 – via ResearchGate.
- Thomas, Jared (12 January 2000). "Lecturer creates academic first. SA". Koori Mail.
