= Stradbroke Island =

Island near Brisbane, Australia

Coordinates: 27°31′58″S 153°27′35.44″E

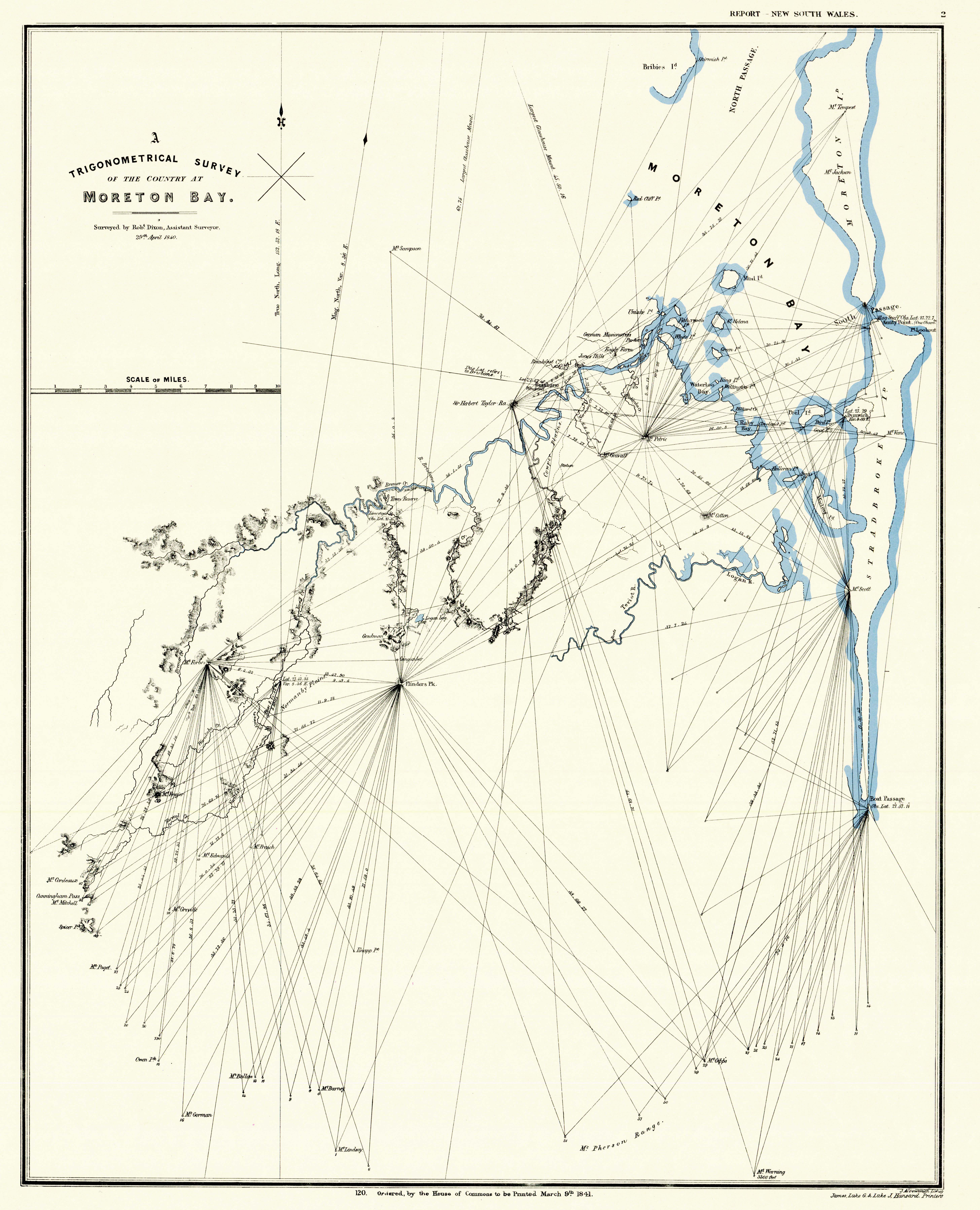
Trigonometrical Survey of Moreton Bay from April 1840 showing Stradbroke Island prior to its division into two separate islands

Stradbroke Island, also known as Minjerribah, was a large sand island that formed much of the eastern side of Moreton Bay near Brisbane, Queensland until the late 19th century. Today the island is split into two islands: North Stradbroke Island and South Stradbroke Island, separated by the Jumpinpin Channel.

In 2009 as part of the Q150 celebrations, the Stradbroke Island was announced as one of the Q150 Icons of Queensland for its role as a "Natural attraction".

== Indigenous history ==
Archaeological evidence suggests the Quandamooka, an Aboriginal Australian people, lived on the island for at least 21,000 years prior to European settlement. It was also a traditional meeting place of Quandamooka peoples such as the Nunukul and Goenpul. A 1964 survey found 121 pre-European dwelling sites with evidence of substantial wooden huts.

Jandai (also known as Janday, Jandewal, Djendewal, Jundai, Goenpul and Jandawal) is one of the Aboriginal languages spoken on Stradbroke Island.

== European settlement ==
There are persistent stories of a 17th-century Spanish shipwreck known locally as the Stradbroke Island Galleon. There exists a body of Aboriginal oral history that may bear on some such incident, and several artefacts have been found in the sand dunes, including an English silver coin from 1597 and the blade of a 17th-century Spanish rapier. The evidence however is not conclusive.

Captain James Cook made the first documented European sighting of the island in 1770 and named Point Lookout, but did not land. The first historically documented contact between Europeans and the local Aborigines was 1803 when Matthew Flinders landed in search of fresh water. The next documented contact was between shipwreck survivors Thomas Pamphlett, Richard Parsons and John Finnegan landed on Moreton Island in April 1823, before being taken to Stradbroke Island by the natives where they were helped and provided with food, shelter and a canoe by the local Aborigines.

Initial white settlement of Stradbroke Island was at Amity Point where a pilot station was established in 1825. More fertile soil, good sources of fresh water and a better harbour was found at the present location of Dunwich so settlement soon concentrated there. Dunwich became a staging point where larger ships were unloaded of cargo which was placed into smaller vessels to be carried over the sand bars of Brisbane River and up to the penal settlement of Brisbane. The Dunwich settlement was in close proximity to a major Aboriginal camp at Myora Spring. Whites and Europeans generally lived in reasonable harmony though there were moments of conflict as would be expected within the context of two very different cultures meeting for the first time.

Early efforts to establish agriculture on the island, especially plans to grow cotton north of Dunwich, resulted in conflicts with the local Aboriginal people, the Ngugi tribe of the Quandamooka people. In March 1830, the 57th regiment seeking reprisals for the murder of a guard, attacked a group of Ngugi people near a lagoon on Moreton Island. This was likely the first significant massacre of indigenous people in the region.

In 1843 the first Catholic mission for Aboriginal people was established on Stradbroke Island by Archbishop Polding, a Passionist priest, who visited and chose the site. It was unsuccessful because of poor relations with the local tribes and lack of resources, and the missionaries withdrew in 1847.

A quarantine station was established at the northern end of the island in July 1850. This was due to its proximity to the shipping route, its isolation and to there being a supply of fresh water available.

On 2 February 1887 the barque Scottish Prince ran aground on the southern end of Stradbroke Island. Three tug boats were dispatched to try to pull the vessel free, but this did not succeed. All of the passengers and crew were rescued but the cargo was remained onboard until the ship broke apart and its goods were washed ashore. Parts of the wreck can still be found in shallow water approximately 500 metres (1,600 ft) offshore south of the Southport Spit and it is a popular diving site. Since 2013, sand movement has resulted in increasing amounts of the wreck becoming visible.

Myora Mission, initially run by the Queensland Aboriginal Protection Association from 1892 and from 1896 by the Queensland Government as an Aboriginal reserve and "industrial and reform school", was used as a source of cheap labour, and eventually closed in 1943.

== Island division ==
In September 1894, heavy seas drove aground the barque Cambus Wallace at a narrow isthmus roughly halfway down the island's length. Salvage activity (including the detonation of a cargo of explosives) weakened the sand dunes along the spit such that by the spring of 1896, storms and tides had washed a permanent breach from Moreton Bay to the Coral Sea.

The island is now two islands separated by the Jumpinpin Channel:

- North Stradbroke Island is the larger of the two, about 38 km long and up to 11 km wide.
- South Stradbroke Island is about 22 km long and at most 2 km wide.

North Stradbroke is the more developed of the two islands, with the three small townships of Dunwich, Amity Point and Point Lookout offering vacation rentals, shops and a range of eateries. It also has a sealed, bitumen road network.

South Stradbroke, while less developed, has a number of anchorages, campsites, and two major tourist resorts, Couran Cove and South Stradbroke Island Resort, or Tipplers. There are almost no sealed roads on the island.

== In popular culture ==
The 2015 novel Ghost Galleon by Errol Bishop is based on the legend of the Stradbroke Island Galleon. Bishop became aware of the legend while the principal of Macleay Island State School in Moreton Bay.

== See also ==
- List of islands of Australia
- Myora Mission
