= Nunukul language =

Extinct Australian Aboriginal language

Nunukul
- Nunagal
- Mundjan
- Native to: Australia
- Region: Minjerribah, Queensland
- Ethnicity: Nunukul
- Extinct: (date missing)
- Language family: Pama–Nyungan: Durubalic; Nunukul
- Dialects: jagarabal/jagarabul; Nunagal

Language codes
- ISO 639-3: xnu
- Glottolog: None
- AIATSIS: E21

- Person: Nunukul
- Language: Moondjan
- Country: Minjerribah (North Stradbroke Island)

Nunukul (Nununkul, Nunugal, Nunagal, misspelled "Nukunul"), or Munjan (Moonjan, Meanjin), is an extinct language of Queensland in Australia. The people it is spoken by are called the Nunukul, but the language is called Moondjan.

== Dialects ==
According to Nils Holmer, there are two dialects of Nunagal, being Yagarabul (referred to him by the names jagarabal or jagarabul) and Nunagal.

== Vocabulary ==
Some words from the Nunukul/Munjan language, as spelt and written by Nunukul/Munjan authors include:

- Gooboora: the Silent Pool
- Oodgeroo: paperbark tree
- Woor: devil / evil being
