= Ngugi people =

Aboriginal Australian people

The Ngugi are an Aboriginal Australian people, one of three Quandamooka peoples, and the traditional inhabitants of Moreton Island.

== Language ==
The Ngugi language was called guwar, a term that, by extension served as one of the names for the people, reflects their word for "no" (gowar). It was mutually intelligible with the other Moreton bay languages: Tom Petrie, who had mastered the Brisbane area Turrbal language could, according to his daughter's reminiscences, understand the speech of Ngugi people from the island. According to Anthony Jefferies, Guwar is a variety of Bundjalung, the population being a residue of speakers of that language who, when the rest of the Bundjalung were forced south as a result of the expansion of the incoming Yugara, much of whose terminology was then adopted into Guwar.

== Country ==
The Ngugi lands covered the entirety of Moreton Island, in their language Mulganpin (Moolgunpin) and covered some 70 square miles (180 km^{2}).

=== Ecology ===
Moreton island has a thin soil cover, which, on the higher ground to the north is interrupted by stretches of swamp land. Fresh water springs were abundant. Wildlife consisted of many varieties of bird, abundant crabs, numerous bandicoots, and large numbers of venomous snakes, among them, death adders, tiger, black, brown and carpet snakes.

The two large sand dunes extending across the south of the island were called Gheebellum and Coonungi.

== Society ==
The Ngugi are considered to be one of three hordes of what are known collectively called the Quandamooka people.

In his archaeological survey over the years 1963-4, Ponosov detected some 72 sites of traditional indigenous habitation on the island. The population of Moreton Island predating European contact is estimated to have been approximately 100, living in groups of 15 to 20. At least five clusters of spacious native huts along the north shore as far as Comboyuro Point (Gnahmoonbilla) (Note: reportedly meaning "place where the woman died") were observed by the earliest visitors.

Lancelot Threlkeld, using reports from a castaway who had survived among the Moreton Bay blacks, argued in 1824 that they were far more advanced than the more southern tribes, dwelling in hut settlements that had the appearance of small villages. One important site for habitation was the southern side of the Cape Moreton headland, since this was the only area where outcroppings of sandy ironstone existed. These sites were quarried to manufacture stone implements, some of which they traded with the Nunukul on Stradbroke Island.

In fishing for mullet, the Ngugi like other Moreton islanders would beat the inshore waters with sticks to enlist the aid of porpoises, who would drive the fish beachwards. They were also expert in catching tailor fish (punba/dai-arli), again enlisting porpoises. The major catches were done when westerlies blew, and Tom Petrie describes one scene he witnessed:

The sea would be calm, and there would be no sign anywhere of a porpoise (Talobilla); the blacks would go long the beach jobbing with their spears into the sand under the water, making a queer noise, also beating the water with the spears. By-and-by, as if in response, porpoises would be seen as they rose to the surface making for the shore and in front of them schools of tailor fish. It may seem wonderful, but they were apparently driving the fish towards the land. When they came near, the blacks would run out into the surf, and with their spears would job down here and there at the fish, at times even getting two on one spear, so plentiful were they. As each fish was speared, it was thrown to shore, and there picked up by the gins. The porpoises would actually be swimming in and out amongst all this, apparently quite unafraid of the darkies. Indeed, they seemed rather to be all on good terms, and I have with my own eyes more than once seen a blackfellow hold out a fish on a spear to a porpoise, and the creature take and eat it. One old porpoise was well known and spoken of fondly.He had a piece of root, or stick of some sort, stuck in his hack, having evidently at one time run into something, and by this he was recognised, for it could be seen plainly The blacks told me it had been in him for years, and they declared that the great man of the island had put it there, thus making him the big fellow of the tribe of porpoises.I have seen this creature take fish from a spear, and the white men working on the island told me they often saw him knocking about with the blacks. At all times porpoises would be spoken of with affection by these Moreton Island blacks (the ngugi tribe), who said they never failed when called to drive in fish to them.

Several Ngugi names survive behind European transcriptions of their language, for the Cape Moreton headland area: Mijin Boowell, Gunemba, Boogaram-calleem, and Cangallioon. It has been conjectured that these terms refer respectively to the midjin bush and berry, canumba (honey), boogaram (bullroarer) or buggeree (bugara), i.e., the braided string used to swing the bullroarer. The cape was a ritual centre for bora initiation ceremonies. Nearby, according to Thomas Welsby who visited the island in 1900 and collected local lore, there was a cave in which, were anyone to enter it and scratch his head, he would be killed by a stone dropping from the cavern ceiling. This may have been the large funeral cave at Mudlieimbah where the bones of the deceased Ngugi were placed. By the 1910s, these skeletons had been taken by collectors.

A Ngugi headman had a repute for developing fresh corroboree dances and songs, which he would think out after retreating to a place of solitude, and then introduce on his return.

Ngugi women had a reputation for making excellent dillies ideal for keeping fish, which they wove from mat-rushes.

== Mythology ==
In Ngugi legend, Warrajamba who among adjacent tribes was a rainbow serpent, shed his blood and formed a red sandhill at Cowen Cowen. There were two key sandhill sites around which a legend, "The Lightning's Playground," was told.

Another dreamtime legend regarding the Ngugi's island was that a black snake and a carpet snake travelled in a hollowed-out chestnut tree canoe from the Pine River, over to Moreton island, harried by a dog that swam menacingly alongside them. Since the black snake was ill, the carpet snake steered the craft. After a time there, they smiled on finding the dingo had died of exhaustion, but their canoe had been swept away, cutting them off from their homeland. Eventually, scouring the island they slipped into the bay opposite Southport, and managed to reach the mainland and work their way home.

A legend explains the bar at South Passage of Moreton Island as the residue of an old woman's bones. She pursued a young man from Swan Bay east of north Stradbroke island after he had stolen a firestick from her campsite. He stole a canoe at Amity to get over to Moreton Island, and, hot in pursuit, so did the old woman, with each landing, one after the other, at Gunemba. The lad, like Achilles among the maidens of Skyros, hid himself among a band of youths undergoing initiation, but the old lady twigged, venturing into the corroboree, and, catching him, bundled him into her dilly bag, to haul him back home. He managed to shake himself loose, grasp some bone skewers used for combing, and stab her blind. Having turned the tables, he then put her in a canoe and let it drift out on the tide to a sandbank where she died, and her remains formed the Bar which is a feature of that strait.

== History of contact ==
As part of a campaign of retaliation also involving the Nunukul, after reciprocal hostilities broke out over the setting up of British military stations on the islands, Captain Clunie despatched armed parties on punitive raids. Between July 1831 and December 1832, in several clashes 5 Europeans died, and an estimated 30-40 Ngugi and Nunukul people were injured or slain. In one such sortie soldiers of the 17th Regiment encircled Ngugi camped at the fresh water lagoon on the southern end of Moreton Island, and killed a score of them.

During the 1830s most of the Ngugi people had left Moreton Island to reside with the Nunukul around the maritime pilot station at Amity Point on Stradbroke Island. Some of them became well-known as excellent seafarers and joined the crew of the pilot boat. After the wreck of the Sovereign in 1847 on a sandbar in the South Passage, six of these Ngugi boat crew gained recognition for rescuing ten people from drowning.

When the pilot station was relocated from Amity Point to Cowan Cowan and Bulwer on Moreton Island, some Ngugi people returned to their homeland to continue as crew members or housekeepers for the pilots. Additionally, when the Cape Moreton Light was opened in 1857, some Ngugi were employed by the first lighthouse keeper, James Braydon. By 1890, it appears that all the remaining Ngugi residing on Moreton Island had either died or had permanently moved to Dunwich, the Myora Mission or Amity on Stradbroke Island.

== Notable people ==
Some of the rescuers of the Sovereign wreck in 1847 were Ngugi, including Toompani, Billy Cassim (Nyoryo), Jack Kalider (Juckle Juckle) and Woondi. They all received Aboriginal breastplates as a reward, while Toompani also received a fishing boat. A street in Amity is named after Toompani.

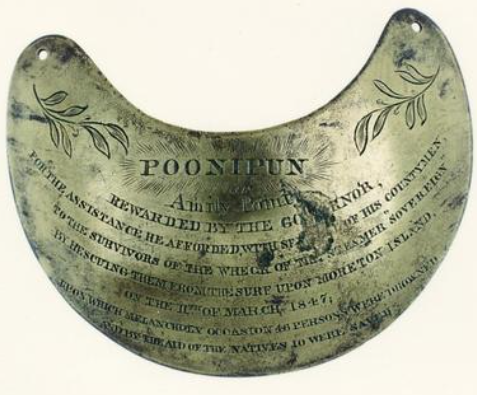
Brass breastplate awarded to Poonipun for assistance in the "Sovereign" shipwreck of 1847

In 1856, Toompani and his Ngugi wife, Thruppan, moved to Cape Moreton to work for James Braydon at the lighthouse. There they had a son named Jacky, who was raised on Moreton Island. When a young man, Jacky was assigned as a trooper for the Native Police where he was shot dead by an officer for neglecting his duty. After the death of his son, Toompani moved to Stradbroke Island where he died in 1886. He was buried at Meriginbah near Amity.

Jack Kalider appears to have been the last Ngugi to have been buried on Moreton Island, being interred probably some time in the 1880s.

The last documented Ngugi to have been born on Moreton Island was Gurriwurribah (Gurri) who was born to parents Tommy Nuggin (Gendarieba) and Sarah. He was born around 1870 and was regarded as the last Ngugi of unmixed heritage. He later lived at Dunwich and was still alive during the 1930s.

Sydney Rollands (Kingal) was an important matriarch of the Ngugi during colonial times. One of her sons, Sammy Rollands, and two grandsons enlisted for the First Australian Imperial Force during WW1. Sammy Rollands was the last person to hunt dugongs in the traditional manner with nets made from tree bark. Kingal died in 1917.

Some other important women of the Ngugi tribe were, according to Tom Petrie, Bournbobian, by then blind and known as Kitty, and Junnumbin (Juno), both sufficiently alert that they identified Petrie after a lapse of a half a century simply by overhearing his voice. Juno married a Filipino fisherman named Fernandez Gonzales and had five daughters, from whom many descendants of the modern-day Quandamooka people are related.

== Some words ==
- targan (ghost of the sea)

== Alternative names ==
- Mugee (Note: their word for people in general (mahgee or mugee).)
- Wogee
- Gnoogee
- Guar, Gowar, Goowar, Gooar
- Nooghi
- Chunchiburri
- Booroo-geen-merrie

== Sources ==
- Anderson, Robert (2001). Peacock, Eve Christine; Boyle, Cathy (eds.). History Life and Times of Robert Anderson Gneebelum Ngugi Mulgumpin (PDF). Uniikup Productions. ISBN 0-9579026-0-3.
- Evans, Raymond (1992). "The mogwi take mi-an-jin: Race relations and the Moreton Bay penal settlement 1824-42" (PDF). In Fisher, Rod (ed.). Brisbane: The Aboriginal presence, 1824-1860. Papers (Brisbane History Group). Vol. 11. Brisbane Historical Group. pp. 7–30.
- Jefferies, Anthony (2011). Guwar, the language of Moreton Island, and its relationship to the Bandjalang and Yagara subgroups: a case for phylogenetic migratory expansion? (pdf) (Thesis). Brisbane: University of Queensland.
- Petrie, Tom; Petrie, Constance Campbell (1904). Tom Petrie's reminiscences of early Queensland. Brisbane: Watson, Ferguson & Co.
- Ponosov, Vladimir Vasil'evich (1974). Results of an archaeological survey of the Southern region of Moreton Bay and of Moreton Island (1963-1964) (PDF). University of Queensland.
- Steele, John Gladstone (1984). Aboriginal Pathways: in Southeast Queensland and the Richmond River. University of Queensland Press. ISBN 978-0-702-25742-1.
- Tindale, Norman Barnett (1974). "Ngugi (QLD)". Aboriginal Tribes of Australia: Their Terrain, Environmental Controls, Distribution, Limits, and Proper Names. Australian National University Press. ISBN 978-0-708-10741-6.
