= Turrbal language =

Australian Aboriginal language

Turrbal
- Yagara
- Native to: Australia
- Region: Queensland
- Ethnicity: Turrbal
- Language family: Pama–Nyungan: Durubalic; Turrbal

Language codes
- ISO 639-3: yxg
- Glottolog: yaga1256 Yagara-Jandai
- AIATSIS: E86 Turubul, E23 Jagara
- ELP: Yagara

Turrbal is an Aboriginal Australian language of the Turrbal people of the Brisbane area of Queensland.

Alternate spellings include Turubul, Turrubal, Turrabul, Toorbal, and Tarabul. (Note: The Turrbal Association (an incorporated Turrbal association that offers cultural services) uses the spelling "Turrbal" in preference to other spellings.)

== Classification ==
The four dialects listed in Dixon (2002) are sometimes seen as separate Durubalic languages, especially Jandai and Nunukul; Yagara, Yugarabul, and Turrbul proper are more likely to be considered dialects. Turrbal (E86) has been variously classified as a language, group of languages or as a dialect of another language. F. J. Watson classifies Turrbal (E86) as a sub group of Yugarabul E66, which is most likely the language Yagara E23. Norman Tindale uses the term Turrbal (E86) to refers to speakers of the language of Yagara E23. John Steele classifies Turrbal (E86) as a language within the Yagara language group. R. M. W. Dixon classifies Turrbal as a dialect of the language of Yagera, in the technical linguistic sense where mutually intelligible dialects are deemed to belong to a single language. Bowern considers Turrbal to be one of five languages of the "Turubulic" language group, the others being Nunukul, Yaraga, Janday and Guwar.

== Phonology ==
=== Consonants ===
| | Peripheral | | Laminal | Apical |
| | Labial | Velar | Palatal | Alveolar |
|---|---|---|---|---|
| Plosive | b | ɡ | ɟ | d |
| Nasal | m | ŋ | ɲ | n |
| Rhotic | | | | r |
| Lateral | | | | l |
| Approximant | w | | j | |

- Stop sounds may also be heard as voiceless [p, t, c, k].

=== Vowels ===
| | Front | Central | Back |
|---|---|---|---|
| Close | i | | u |
| Mid | e | | o |
| Open | | a | |

- Vowel length is also distinctive.
- A lax /a/ can also be heard as [ə].

== Vocabulary ==
Some words from the Turrbal / Yagara language include:

- Bigi: sun
- Binung: ear
- Bugwal: wallaby
- Buneen: echidna
- Bangil / bungil: grass
- Buhn: knee
- Buyu: shin
- Deear : teeth
- Dhagun: land
- Dhambur : mouth
- Dharang: leg
- Dhiggeri: belly / stomach
- Dinna: foot
- Dyrrbin: bone
- Gahm: head
- Giga: shoulder
- Gurumba bigi: good day
- Gujah / guttah: snake
- Gagarr / guyurr: fish
- Juhrram: rain
- Juwahduwan / juwahnduwan / juwanbinl: bird(s)
- Killen: finger
- Kundul: canoe
- Marra: hand
- Dumbirrbi / marrambi: koala
- Mil: eye / eyes
- Guruman / murri: kangaroo
- Muru: nose
- Nammul: children
- Nggurrun: neck
- Ngumbi: home / camp
- Tahbil: water (fresh)
- Towan: fish
- Tullei: tree
- Waiyebba: arm
- Wunya: welcome / greetings
- Yilam: forehead

The literary journal Meanjin takes its name from the Turrbal name for the land centred at Gardens Point on which Brisbane was founded. This name is sometimes used for the greater Brisbane area.

== Loanword yakka ==
The Australian English word yakka, an informal term referring to any work, especially of strenuous kind, comes from a Yagara word yaga, the verb for 'work'.
