= Nunukul =

Aboriginal Australian people

The Nunukul, also spelt Noonuccal and known also as Moondjan are an Aboriginal Australian people, one of three Quandamooka peoples, who traditionally lived on Minjerribah, in Moreton Bay Area and in mainland Brisbane regions.

== Language ==
The Nunukul spoke Mundjan (also known as Nunukan), a variety of Yagera that had close affinities with the dialects of Turrbal and Jandai, though some prefer to use Janday as the generic term for this dialect cluster. Unlike the other dialects, it used mundjan instead of the standard dialect word jandai for the concept of 'no', and this was a marker of their tribal difference.

== Social groups ==
On North Stradbroke Island and the mainland opposite there were 2 or perhaps 3 clan divisions of the Quandamooka: the Nunukul, Goenpul Koobeenpul. Steele suggests that the Goenpul and the Koobeenpul may be one and the same clan, as the similarity in the names suggests.

== History ==
In the early period of contact with Europeans, the Nunukul took in castaways and fleeing convicts, such as the cedar cutters Thomas Pamphlett, Richard Parsons and John Finnegan who in 1823 lived for some 230 days among them, the Ningy Ningy (Note: Sources identify the 'Ninginingi with either the Jagera/Turrbal or the Undanbi.) and the Ngugi. It appears that the natives of the area believed that the white-skinned people were the spirits of their ancestors who had returned to their homes. These spirits were called duggai on Stradbroke Island, targan on Moreton Island, and mogwi on the coastland opposite.

The British set up manned pilot station in their territory in 1825. Initially they continued to show themselves hospitable to the newcomers, but gradually relations soured over frictions arising from possession of indigenous women, some of whom, according to Nunukul oral history traditions, suffered abduction. On 10 July 1831, Nunukul warriors at Dunwich killed James Wood, a convict, in retribution for 'injuries suffered from Europeans'. Around this time they also killed a soldier stationed at Amity Point. The Nununkul injured Corporal Robert Cain, Private William Wright and a third man, the Thomas Kinchella sometime in 1832. Squads of soldiers were despatched to deal out summary justice to the islanders encountered. William Reardon, convict hutkeeper, known to the Nunukul by the sobriquet of Chooroong is said to have lured a tribal elder out on a fishing expedition, and, once the crew had killed him, to have cut off his head. On the 25 November of that year Reardon was surprised near his hut at Pyrrnn-Pyrrnn-Pa (the little sandhill), entangled in towrows (fishing nets) and beaten to death with waddies.

In 1837, a tall (6 foot 2) 17 year-old Nunukul, subsequently named Toggery, and a kipper or adolescent initiand called Peermudgeon stowed away on Captain F. Fyan's schooner as it left Amity Point bound for Sydney. On his arrival there, he was hailed as a second Bennelong and was awarded a uniform of military fashion replete with spurs. Fyan himself had a brass crescent made for his Nunukul stowaway, with inscribed images of a kangaroo and emum together with Toggery's name. (Note: A Wynnum fisherman found the relic while walking in the sandhills of Moreton Island in 1940. (Evans 1992, pp. 7–8)) In an expedition to recapture runaway convicts, which was led by Chief Constable McIntosh, he was wounded on landing and two of his men, a Charles Holdsworth and James O'Regan, were captured. Their bodies were recovered on 20 December 1832. Several natives were killed and wounded in a clash soon after. It is estimated that as a result of the escalation in fighting between the islanders and the British military units over the period between July 1831 and December 1832 something like thirty and forty Ngugi and Nunukal died or were wounded.

In March 1835 the whaling ship Elizabeth anchored at Amity, and during the sojourn of the sailors, the Nunukul were infected with venereal disease. The disease rapidly became a scourge to them and the Moreton Bay tribes, leading to a rapid drop in numbers.

As one of the Quandamooka peoples, the Nunukul were part of an alliance which saw them and their Turball allies pitted in rivalry against the Dalla, Ningy Ningy, Djindubari and Gubbi Gubbi bloc. A Nunukul, Bobby Winter, played, together with the former convict Eugene Doucette who had taken up residence among the Nunukul at Amity Point, Queensland Amity Point, played a key role in the capture of the Dalla-Djindubari guerilla leader Dundalli's brother, Oumulli in 1848.

== Fishing ==
The people of Amity Point were observed by J. K. E. Fairholme as they enlisted the aid of dolphins (Note: The text has porpoises' but this is a typical nineteenth century confusion, and must be corrected to dolphins. (Neil 2002, p. 5)) to capture mullet:

'Near the deserted Pilot Station at Amity Point, some of the natives may constantly be found during the warmer mouths of the year fishing for "Mullet," a very fine fish about the size of a mackerel. Iii this pursuit they are assisted in a most wonderful manner by the Porpoises. It seems that from time immemorial a sort of understanding has existed between the blacks and the Porpoises for their mutual advantage, and the former pretend to know all the Porpoises about the spot, and even have names for them. The beach here consists of shelving sand, and near the shore are small hillocks of sand, on which the blacks sit, watching for the appearance of a shoal of Mullet. Their nets, which are used by hand, and are stretched on a frame about 4 feet wide, he ready on the beach. On seeing a shoal, several of the men run down, and with their spears make a peculiar splashing in the water. Whether the Porpoises really understand this as a signal, or think it is the fish, it is difficult to determine, but the result is always the same; they at once come in towards the shore, driving the mullet before them. As they near the edge, a number of the blacks with spears and handnets quickly divide to the right and left, and dash into the water. The Porpoises being outside the shoal, numbers of fish are secured before they can break away. In the scene of apparent confusion that takes place, the blacks and Porpoises are seen splashing about close to each other. So fearless are the latter, that strangers, who have expressed doubts as to their tameness, have often been shown that they will take a fish from the end of a spear, when held to them. For my own part I cannot doubt that the understanding is real, and that the natives know these Porpoises, and that strange Porpoises would not show so little fear of the natives. The oldest men of the tribe say that the same kind of fishing has always been carried on as long as they can remember. Porpoises abound in the Bay, but in no other part do the natives fish with their assistance.'

In interviews with Fairholme, the local people stated that the collaboration between dolphins and themselves had gone on for as long as anyone could remember. Since the island has been inhabited for over 50,000 years, it has been suggested that what Fairholme recounted may be 'an oral history link to the most ancient of human-cetacean interactions with a positive outcome for both.'

== Notable people ==
- Karl Amon, Australian rules footballer
- Leeanne Enoch, of mixed Nunukul/Ngugi descent, the first indigenous woman elected to Parliament
- Oodgeroo Noonuccal, otherwise known as Kath Walker, an indigenous Australian writer, poet and activist
- Baizam Nunukul, otherwise known as Dennis Walker

== Sources ==
- Allen, Simon J. (2014). "From exploitation to adoration: The historical and contemporary context of human-cetacean interactions". In Higham, James; Bejder, Lars; Williams, Rob (eds.). Whale-watching: Sustainable Tourism and Ecological Management. Cambridge University Press. pp. 31–46. ISBN 978-0-521-19597-3.
- Connors, Libby (2006). "Traditional Law and Indigenous Resistance at Moreton Bay 1842-1855, Part II" (PDF). Australia and New Zealand Law and History: 1–13.
- Connors, Libby (2009). "A hanging: a hostage drama and several homicides: why sovereignty in 1859 is problematic". Queensland History Journal. 20 (12): 716–727.
- Di Piertro, Kav (26 May 2022). "Amon's Path to Discovering his Family History". AFL Players Association.
- Dixon, Robert M. W. (2002). Australian Languages: Their Nature and Development. Vol. 1. Cambridge University Press. ISBN 978-0-521-47378-1.
- Evans, Raymond (1992). "The mogwi take mi-an-jin: Race relations and the Moreton Bay penal settlement 1824-42". In Fisher, Rod (ed.). Brisbane: The Aboriginal presence, 1824-1860. The Brisbane History Group Papers. pp. 7–30.
- Evans, Raymond (1999). Fighting Words: Writing about Race. University of Queensland Press. ISBN 978-0-702-23109-4.
- Evans, Raymond (2007). A History of Queensland. Cambridge University Press. ISBN 978-0-521-87692-6.
- Fairholme, J. K. E. (1856). "The blacks of Moreton Bay and the Porpoises". Proceedings of the Zoological Society of London. 24: 353–354.
- Neil, David T. (2002). "Cooperative fishing interactions between Aboriginal Australians and dolphins in eastern Australia". Anthrozoös. 15 (1): 3–18. doi:10.2752/089279302786992694. S2CID 144814874.
- Steele, J. G. (1970). Pamphlet, Uniacke and Field (PDF). Queensland Heritage. pp. 3–14.
- Steele, John Gladstone (2015). Aboriginal Pathways: in Southeast Queensland and the Richmond River. University of Queensland Press. ISBN 978-0-702-25742-1.
- Tindale, Norman (1974). Nunukul (QLD). South Australian Museum.
- Tuahine, Michelle (2 February 2015). "Nunukul-Nughi woman becomes first Indigenous woman in Qld parliament". National Indigenous Radio Service.
- Watson, Irene (2014). Aboriginal Peoples, Colonialism and International Law: Raw Law (2nd ed.). Routledge. ISBN 978-1-317-93837-8.
