= Hager Ali =

German political scientist and journalist

- Born: Frankfurt/Main
- Occupations: research fellow, university lecturer, freelance journalist

Academic background
- Education: Goethe-University Frankfurt, Central European University Budapest
- Alma mater: University of Hamburg, Germany

Academic work
- Discipline: Political science
- Sub-discipline: Civil-military relations in authoritarian regimes
- Institutions: German Institute for Global and Area Studies, Hamburg
- Website: Official webpage at GIGA-Institute

Hager Ali (Arabic: هاجر علي) is a German political scientist, university lecturer and freelance journalist. As research fellow at the German Institute for Global and Area Studies (GIGA) in Hamburg and freelance journalist, she has published articles on her research focusing on civil-military relations in authoritarian regimes in the Middle East and North Africa. She also communicates her research in German and international media, as well as in public events.

== Early life and education ==
Ali was born and raised in Frankfurt/Main the daughter of Egyptian parents. In addition to her two mother tongues, German and Arabic, she also speaks English and French. After graduating with a B.A. in political science and sociology from the Goethe University in Frankfurt in 2016, she earned an M.A. in political science at the Central European University in Budapest.

== Career ==
Since October 2018, she has been working as a research fellow with the German Institute for Global and Area Studies (GIGA) in Hamburg. The GIGA is an international research institute committed to a global approach and conducting research in the fields of comparative area studies on Africa, Asia, Latin America and the Middle East, as well as on global social and political developments. Among others, the GIGA advises the German Foreign Office and other parts of the German federal government.

Ali is also a doctoral candidate at the University of Hamburg, preparing her PhD thesis titled Praetorianism in the MENA-Region. Military Governance and Civilian Control across Regime Types. Her main fields of research and publications are the political and security situation in the Middle East and North Africa, as well as in Sahel countries like Sudan and in Afghanistan.

=== Research in political science ===
Her research is focused on civil-military relations in West Asia and North Africa, in particular on military coups and civilian control in authoritarian regimes, on regime stability, as well as electoral systems and party politics in these countries. Another focus of her research are the international operations of the German defence forces in West Asia and the Sahel. Among others, she has published articles for the academic journals Africa Spectrum and the German Journal of Comparative Politics, discussing the actions of the Sudanese military since the 2019 Sudanese coup d'état and the electoral reforms in Tunisia.

Since March 2022, she has acted as external editor and author for the online publication The Loop of the European Consortium for Political Research (ECPR). At the ECPR 2023 conference at Charles University in Prague, she presented a paper titled "Autocracies with Adjectives: The Need for Better Classifications of Autocratic Regimes".

=== Journalism ===
Since September 2010, Ali has been writing as a freelance journalist for various German and international media. Based on her research on the civil war in Sudan, she has published articles for the German daily Der Tagesspiegel and for the English edition of Al Jazeera, among others. Further, she was interviewed about current political crises in Sudan, Libya, Algeria and Niger for German TV and online magazines including the Tagesschau, Deutsche Welle, Qantara and the Swiss Broadcasting Corporation. She has also participated in public panel discussions about military coups in Africa.

=== Academic teaching ===
In 2023, she taught a seminar in the political science department at the University of Hamburg on the emergence, impact and collapse of hybrid and autocratic regimes. The same year, she lectured on public science and communication research at the Institute for Peace Research and Security Policy at this university. The aim of the course was to communicate scientific research to political interest groups and the general public by academic authors.

== Professional memberships ==
- Inter-University Seminar on Armed Forces and Society
- American Political Science Association
- European Research Group on Military and Society
- German Political Science Association
- International Studies Association
- European Consortium for Political Research
- German Middle East Studies Association for Contemporary Research and Documentation
- International Association for Political Science Students

== Selected publications ==
- Ali, Hager (2024). The War in Sudan: How Weapons and Networks Shattered a Power Struggle. GIGA Focus Middle East, 2, ISSN 1862-3611
- Ali, Hager (18 May 2023). "The Sudan crisis: A power struggle by design". Al Jazeera.
- Ali, Hager; Kurtz, Gerrit (2023). "Stopping the War in Sudan: Civilian Actors, not Just the Parties to the Conflict, Should Lead the Peace Negotiations". www.giga-hamburg.de.
- Ali, Hager (2023). "Why the Military Promised to Withdraw from Power in Sudan". Political Violence at a Glance. doi:10.1007/s12286-023-00561-z. PMC 9993365.
- Ali, Hager (2023). "Defense against small parties: electoral reforms and their impact on Tunisia's electoral system since the Arab Spring". Zeitschrift für vergleichende Politikwissenschaften. 16 (3): 483–503. doi:10.1007/s12286-023-00561-z. PMC 9993365.
- Ali, Hager / Salah Ben Hammou / Jonathan Powell (2022). "Between Coups and Election: Constitutional Engineering and Military Entrenchment in Sudan". Africa Spectrum. German Institute for Global and Area Studies.
- Ali, Hager (2022). "Egypt after the Arab Spring: A Legacy of No Advancement". www.giga-hamburg.de. German Institute for Global and Area Studies. ISSN 1862-3611.
- Ali, Hager (2021-08-10). "Holding elections in Libya is not a solution to the country's deep-seated problems". The Loop.
- Ali, Hager (2021-09-30). "Counterinsurgency in Afghanistan failed long before the Taliban took over". The Loop.
