= GIGA Journal Family =

International publishing initiative

GIGA Journal Family is a publishing initiative of the German Institute for Global and Area Studies (GIGA) that brings together four international area studies journals. It comprises the GIGA journals Africa Spectrum, Journal of Current Chinese Affairs, Journal of Politics in Latin America, and Journal of Current Southeast Asian Affairs offering original research and empirical analysis on contemporary politics, society and economy of Africa, China, Latin America and Southeast Asia.

== Publishing Concept ==
The GIGA Journal Family was funded by the German Research Foundation (Deutsche Forschungsgemeinschaft, DFG) as a pilot project in open-access publishing. Since the beginning of 2009 all socio-scientific journals of the German Institute for Global and Area Studies have been transformed into open-access journals which means their full content is freely online accessible without time delay or cost to the reader. In addition, it remains available in traditional printed format. To ensure the journals' quality, all essays are evaluated in a double-blind peer-review process.
