= Indo-Pacific =

Biogeographic marine region of Earth

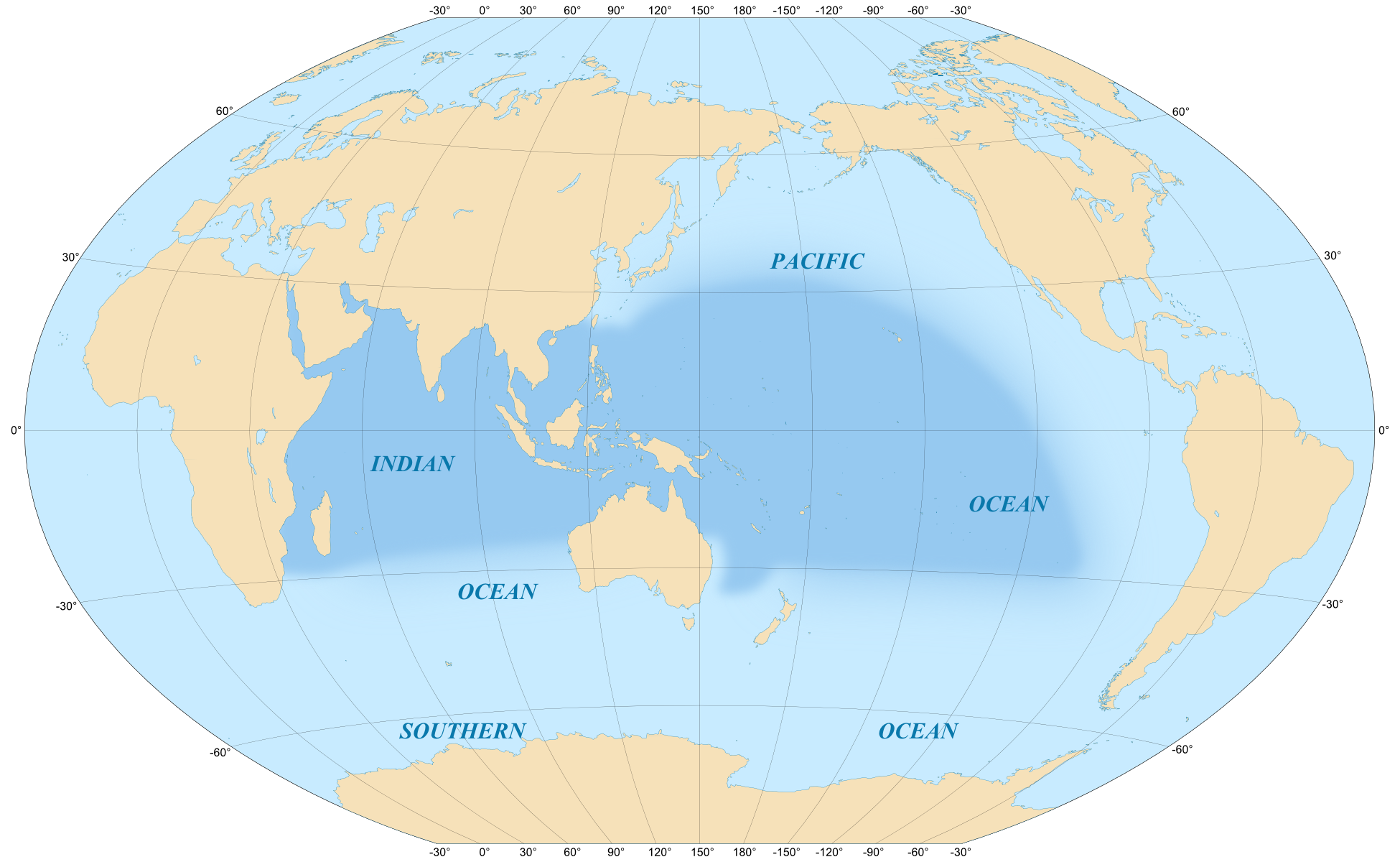
Area covered by the Indo-Pacific biogeographic region

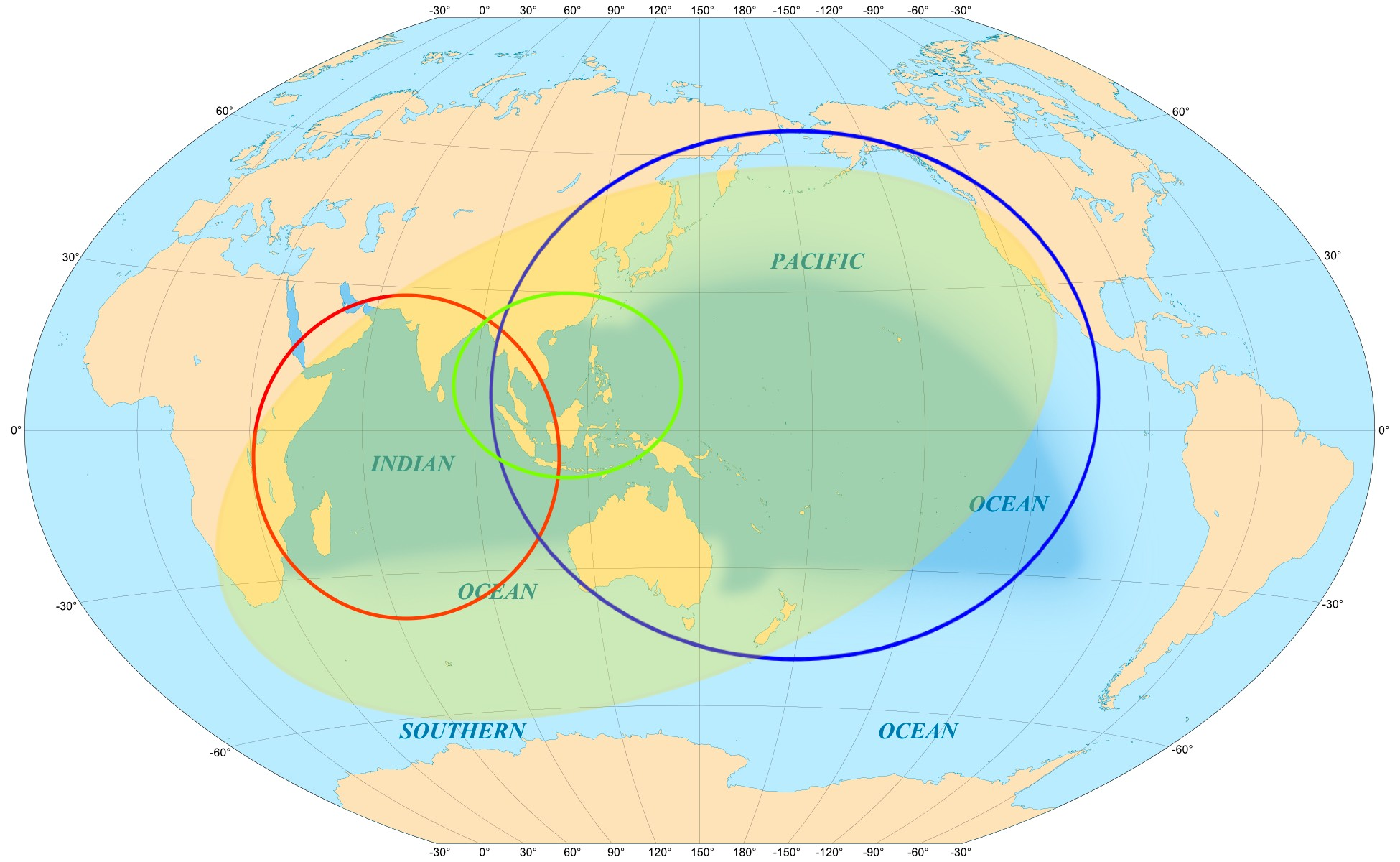
Indo-Pacific. The green ellipse covers the ASEAN.

The Indo-Pacific is a vast biogeographic region of Earth. In a narrow sense, sometimes known as the Indo-West Pacific or Indo-Pacific Asia, it comprises the tropical waters of the Indian Ocean, the western and central Pacific Ocean, and the seas connecting the two. The term is especially useful in marine biology, ichthyology, and similar fields, since many marine habitats are continuously connected from Madagascar to Japan and Oceania, and a number of species occur over that range, but are not found in the Atlantic Ocean.

As a distinct marine realm, the region has a high species richness, with the world's highest species richness being found at its heart in the Coral Triangle, and a remarkable gradient of decreasing species richness radiating outward in all directions. The region includes over 3,000 species of fish, compared with around 1,200 in the next richest marine region, the Western Atlantic, and around 500 species of reef building corals, compared with about 50 species in the Western Atlantic.

The term first appeared in academic use in oceanography and geopolitics. Scholarship has shown that the "Indo-Pacific" concept circulated in Weimar Germany, and spread to interwar Japan. German political oceanographers envisioned an "Indo-Pacific" comprising anticolonial India and republican China, as German allies, against "Euro-America".

Since the late 2010s, the term "Indo-Pacific" has been increasingly used in geopolitical discourse. It is seen by some as a replacement for the "Asia-Pacific" regional concept which was pioneered by Australia and Japan in the 1970s and 1980s. Australia officially transitioned its strategic focus from the 'Asia-Pacific' to the 'Indo-Pacific' in 2013, becoming the first country to formally adopt the Indo-Pacific as its official strategic framework. As a geopolitical concept, the Indo-Pacific has a "symbiotic link" with the Quadrilateral Security Dialogue, or "Quad", an informal grouping between Australia, Japan, India, and the United States. It has been argued that the concept may lead to a change in popular "mental maps" of how the world is understood in strategic terms. According to the political scientist Amitav Acharya, the "Indo-Pacific" was a concept built by strategists. The Indo-Pacific started to gain ground in international relations literature as a geopolitical challenge by the U.S. toward China, which still prefers the regional term Asia-Pacific. The companion term "Euro-Atlantic" is often used by European leaders to denote a vaguely defined geopolitical space which is understood to include Europe and North America. The Euro-Atlantic term is also popular with Chinese leaders.

The Asia-Pacific term is still used in business and finance discussions due to legacy corporate footprints, but among many politicians, its use is now broadly interpreted as a conscious political choice to minimize India's growing role in regional affairs. The Asia-Pacific term has historically not always included India, as they do not have a Pacific coast.

In its widest sense, the Indo-Pacific geopolitically covers all nations and islands surrounding either the Indian Ocean or the Pacific Ocean. This definition encompasses mainland African and Asian nations who border these oceans, such as India and South Africa, Indian Ocean territories such as the Kerguelen Islands and Seychelles, Indonesia (which is within the bounds of both the Indian Ocean and the Pacific), Philippines, Taiwan, China, Korea, Japan, Russia and other Far East nations bordering the Pacific, as well as Australia and all the Pacific Islands east of them. The widest geopolitical definition also encompasses Pacific nations of the Americas such as Canada or Mexico, and the subarctic areas of the North Pacific, like Alaska's Bering Sea islands. ASEAN countries (defined as those in Southeast Asia) are considered to be geographically at the centre of the political Indo-Pacific.

== Subdivisions ==
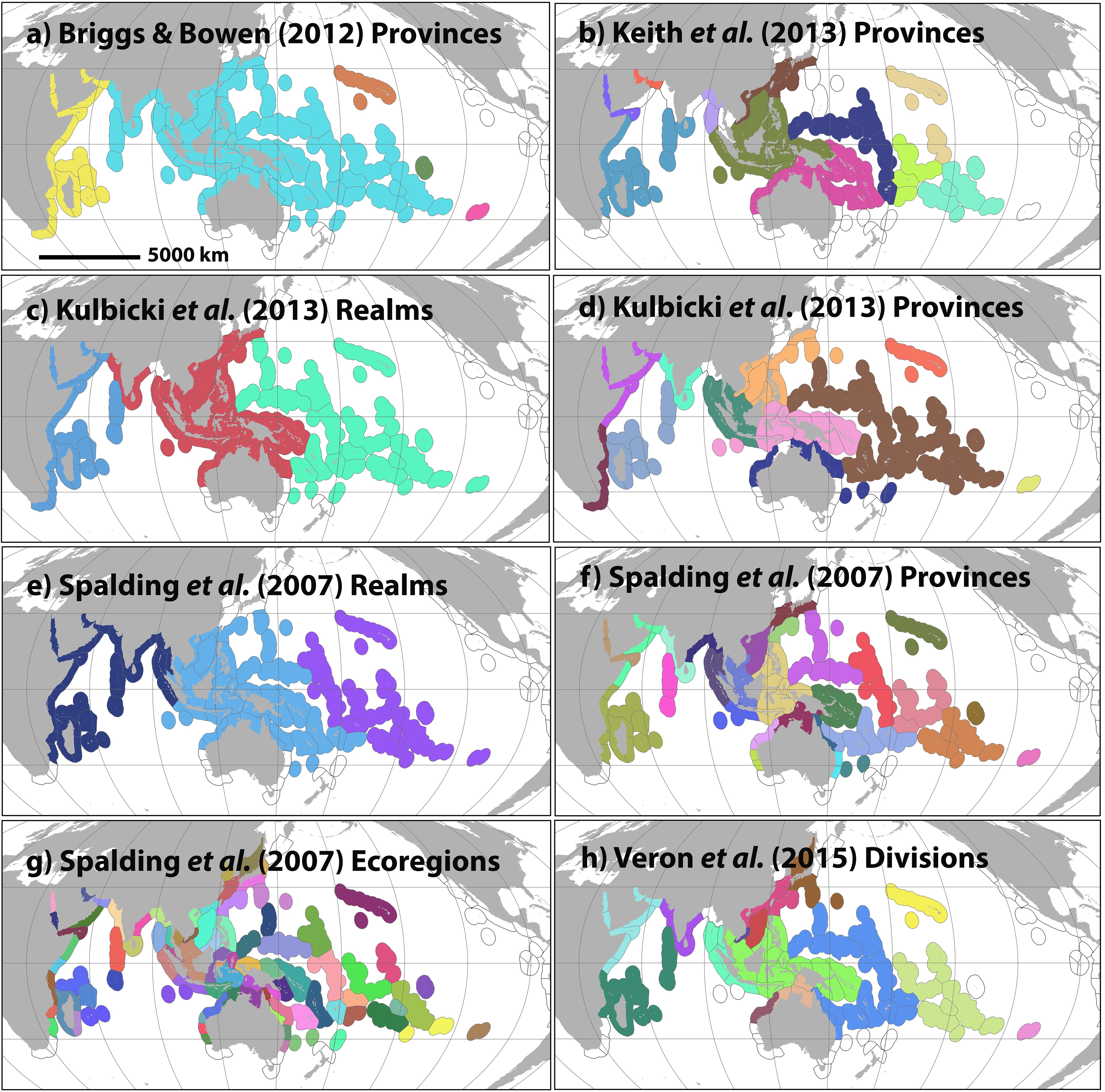
Biogeographic regionalizations that were tested using model selection with analysis of molecular variance (AMOVA) by Crandall et al. 2019. Colours represent different regions within a scheme.

The WWF and Nature Conservancy divide the Indo-Pacific into 3 realms (or subrealms), and each of these into 25 marine provinces and 77 ecoregions (Marine Ecoregions of the World; MEOW) based on data-driven expert opinion. Other schemes for subdivision of the Indo-Pacific have included: 5 provinces, based on endemism in fishes; 3 regions split into 10 provinces based on dissimilarity of fish assemblages, 11 provinces based on range boundaries in corals, 12 divisions split into 124 ecoregions based on biogeographic clustering from coral distributions and finally 8 realms from distributions of 65,000 marine species. All but the last of these schemes were tested against one another by an international consortium of marine scientists using genetic data from 56 Indo-Pacific species, with the reasoning that genetic data should reflect the evolutionary processes that structure the Indo-Pacific. While there was no clear winning scheme, and all schemes were supported by data from at least one species, the genetic data in general favored schemes with few subdivisions, supporting the Indo-Pacific as relatively unstructured biogeographic realm - possibly the world's largest. Below are briefly described the 3 MEOW realms of the Indo-Pacific:

=== Central Indo-Pacific ===
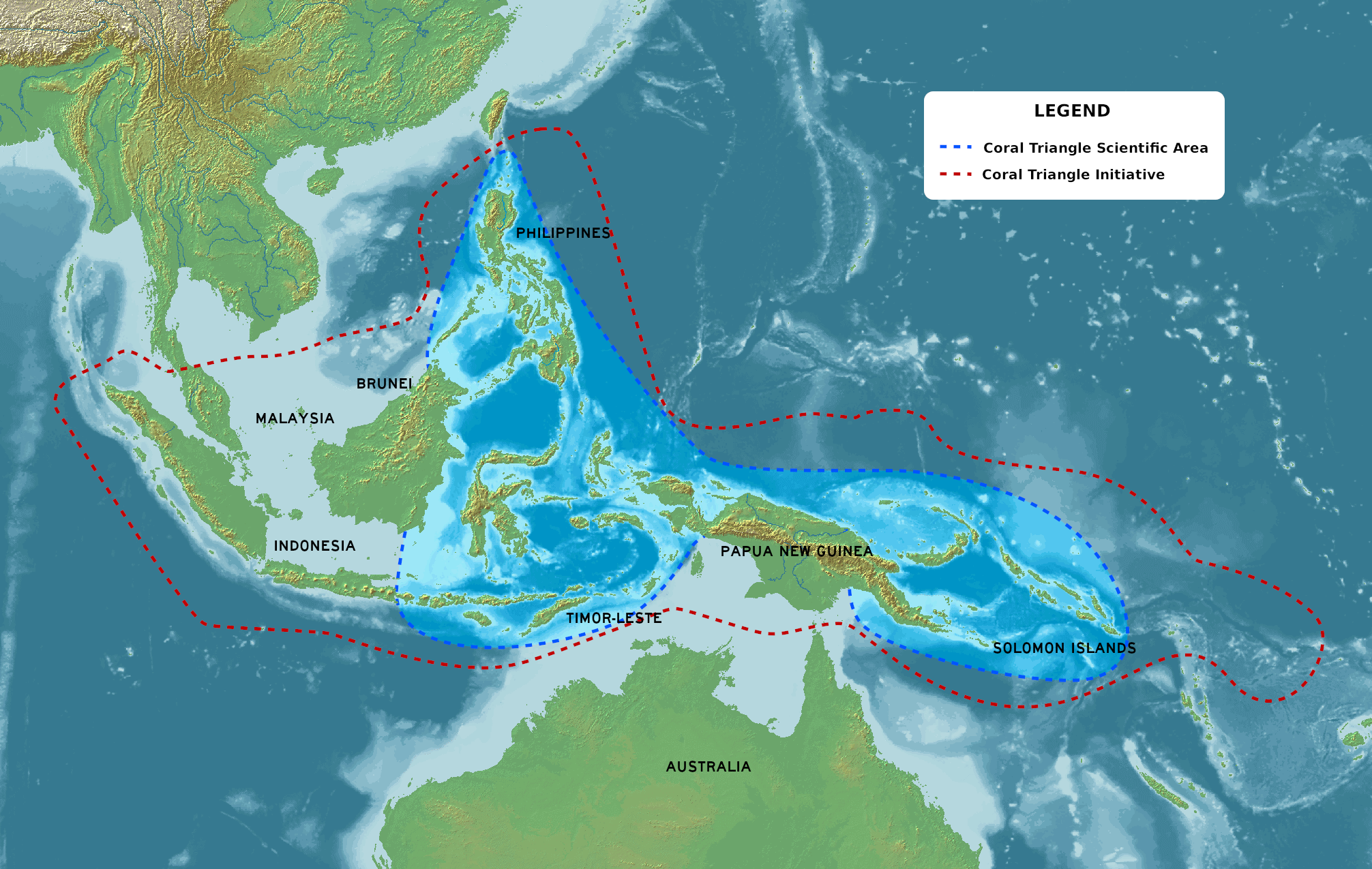
The Coral Triangle and countries participating in the Coral Triangle Initiative

The Central Indo-Pacific includes the numerous seas and straits connecting the Indian and Pacific oceans, including the seas surrounding the Indonesian archipelago (with the exception of Sumatra's northwest coast, which is part of the Western Indo-Pacific), the South China Sea, the Philippine Sea, the north coast of Australia, and the seas surrounding New Guinea, western and central Micronesia, New Caledonia, the Solomon Islands, Vanuatu, Fiji, and Tonga. The Central Indo-Pacific, due in part to its central location at the meeting of two oceans, has the greatest richness and diversity of marine organisms, specifically located within the Coral Triangle, which contains 76% of all known coral species in the world.

=== Eastern Indo-Pacific ===
The Eastern Indo-Pacific surrounds the mostly volcanic islands of the central Pacific Ocean, extending from the Marshall Islands in the west through central and southeastern Polynesia to Hawaii, to the west coast of Chile. The World Wide Fund for Nature believe the region ends at Chile's Easter Island and Isla Salas y Gómez, although it is sometimes extended even further to include Chile's Desventuradas Islands and Juan Fernández Islands.

=== Western Indo-Pacific ===
The Western Indo-Pacific covers the western and central portion of the Indian Ocean, including Africa's east coast and the Mozambique Channel, surrounding Madagascar, the Seychelles, the Comoros, the Mascarene Islands, Maldives, and the Chagos Archipelago; as well as the Red Sea, the Gulf of Aden, the Persian Gulf, the Arabian Sea, the Bay of Bengal, and the Andaman Sea.

== Ecology ==
Some seashore and coastal plants are found throughout most of the region, including the trees Pisonia grandis, Calophyllum inophyllum, Heliotropium arboreum, Pandanus tectorius, Cordia subcordata, Guettarda speciosa, and the shrubs Scaevola taccada, Suriana maritima, and Pemphis acidula. These plants have adapted to grow on coral sand, and have seeds adapted to crossing salt water, including distribution by birds or which can survive floating in salt water.

The trees coconut (Coco nucifera), candlenut (Aleurites moluccanus), and Morinda citrifolia originated in the Central Indo-Pacific, and were spread further across the region by human settlers.

== Economic region ==
The Indo-West Pacific has been a hub of economic activity since ancient times. The entrance of the European colonial powers, such as the Dutch and British East India Companies and the Portuguese, and the launch of a trans-Pacific transport of slaves, migrants, and goods, created deeper Indo-Pacific economic integration.

The "Indo-Pacific" has been an economic idea since its early formulation in Weimar Germany. According to Hansong Li, the German geographer Karl Haushofer, son of the economist Max Haushofer, believed that capital, along with urbanisation and population growth, are key vectors that determine the 'manometers' of the oceanic region. Haushofer also explained why industrialisation broke out in Europe rather than the Indo-Pacific by a spatial theory of demography.

Australia is the largest country to border both the Indian Ocean and Pacific Ocean, with the only others being the ASEAN-affiliated countries of Indonesia, Malaysia, Singapore, Timor-Leste and Thailand. Australia has historically had strong economic and political ties to neighboring South Pacific countries affiliated with the Pacific Islands Forum (which it co-founded in 1971), in addition to having over 80% of its population living within just 50 kilometers of the east coast. This has led to it traditionally being viewed as a Pacific country rather than an Indian Ocean-oriented country. Australia's secondary focus on the Indian Ocean has been compared to Israel, as most of Israel's population lives on the Mediterranean coast, with only a small section of the country being connected to the Indian Ocean via the Gulf of Aqaba/Red Sea. In 1970, the name "Indian Pacific" was chosen for an Australian train service connecting the Pacific city of Sydney to Perth, which is Australia's only major Indian Ocean coast city. In 1986, the name "Indian Pacific" was also chosen as the name for the holding company controlling the West Coast Eagles, an Australian rules football club based in Perth. It competes in the Australian Football League, primarily based on the country's east coast. The club is still legally known as Indian Pacific Limited, despite trading under West Coast Eagles Football Club. In the 1970s and 1980s, Australia became one of the primary architects of Pacific Rim regionalism/Asia-Pacific regionalism, with Australia and Japan collaborating on the founding of regional institutions such as Pacific Basin Economic Council (PBEC), the Pacific Trade and Development (PAFTAD) forum and the Pacific Economic Cooperation Council (PECC), before eventually co-founding Asia-Pacific Economic Cooperation (APEC) in 1989. APEC was originally intended to only include countries on the western side of the Pacific, but it shifted direction when the United States and Canada became part of the initial membership. It continued to gain new members during the 1990s, evolving into one of the most comprehensive Pacific Rim organizations, as it came to include countries who are absent from more Asian-oriented Pacific blocs, such as Russia and those in Latin America. Pacific Rim organizations founded in the late 20th Century did not include South Asian countries only facing the Indian Ocean, such as India, who have repeatedly been denied membership in APEC. APEC also does not include landlocked countries adjacent to the Pacific such as Laos, or South Pacific countries in the Pacific Islands Forum (with the exception of Australia, New Zealand and Papua New Guinea). In 1997, the Indian Ocean Rim Association (IORA) was established, with it including countries bordering the Indian Ocean, such as Australia, Bangladesh, India, Kenya, Madagascar, Mozambique, Pakistan, South Africa, Tanzania, as well as small island states like Mauritius and Seychelles. All 6 countries which border both the Pacific and Indian Oceans (Australia, Indonesia, Malaysia, Singapore, Thailand, Timor-Leste) are members of the IORA, and with the exception of Timor Leste, 5 of these 6 countries are also dual-members of APEC. The IORA has generally had less engagement than Pacific Rim-initiatives such as APEC, and Iran, the United Arab Emirates and Oman are the only oil-rich Gulf nations which are full members, with Kuwait and Saudi Arabia only being associate members and Bahrain, Iraq and Qatar having no involvement. Compared to the relative stability of Pacific Rim countries, the organization also has countries with significantly differing priorities, with IORA members such as Somalia and Yemen being among some of the poorest and most war-torn countries in the world.

In the 21st century, with the rising involvement of the United States in the new growth areas of Asia, the idea of the Indo-Pacific Economic Corridor (IPEC) emerged during the U.S.–India Strategic Dialogue of 2013. The Secretary of State John Kerry referred to the potential of the Indo-Pacific Economic Corridor in transforming the prospects for development and investments as well as for trade and transit between the economies of South and Southeast Asia Indo-Pacific economic corridor.

K. Yhome in his scholarly study has mapped out the potential for various emerging trans-regional corridors in Asia along with the challenges of linking IPEC into the larger web of regional economic integration initiatives taking shape in the region in 2017.

In February 2016, The Comprehensive and Progressive Agreement for Trans-Pacific Partnership (CPTPP) was signed. Originally named the Trans-Pacific Partnership (TPP), it was envisioned as a major Pacific Rim free trade agreement that establishes deep economic integration, tariff reductions, and rules-based standards across member economies. It was seen as a way for the Democratic Obama-led United States to counter Chinese economic influence by imposing a rules-based order. The trade pact did not include China (who are APEC members) but its membership initially closely mirrored APEC membership, as all twelve founding signatories were Pacific Rim countries in APEC. However, the TPP shifted on 23 January 2017, when newly inaugurated Republican President Donald Trump signed an executive order formally pulling the United States out of the deal. Trump pulled out of the deal as part of his broader "America First" economic outlook, as he viewed the TPP as benefiting foreign countries at the expense of American workers. Following the American withdrawal, the remaining eleven members salvaged the initiative by signing the renamed CPTPP in March 2018, which officially entered into force in December 2018. In the post-American exit era, the CPTPP evolved beyond its original geographic boundaries and strict APEC overlap. The United Kingdom applied for membership in February 2021, signed its accession protocol in July 2023, and officially acceded in December 2024, becoming the agreement's first non-Pacific member. Costa Rica, which applied in August 2022 and substantially concluded accession negotiations in May 2026, is set to become the first CPTPP member in the Pacific Rim that was not already an APEC member. Reflecting a continuing expansion into new areas, the Indian Ocean-facing United Arab Emirates has engaged in preparatory accession discussions, with Atlantic-facing nations including Argentina, Uruguay and Ukraine having also formally applied or expressed interest in joining. Since 2025, the European Union has increasingly sought integration and strategic alignment with the CPTPP. This European push toward CPTPP integration comes as a direct response to Trump's protectionist tariff policies and divisive economic measures against traditional middle power allies and neighbors.

On 23 May 2022, the new Democratic president of the United States, Joe Biden, launched the Indo-Pacific Economic Framework for Prosperity (IPEF). This agreement includes a dozen of initial partners including: Australia, Brunei, India, Indonesia, Japan, Republic of Korea, Malaysia, New Zealand, the Philippines, Singapore, Thailand, and Vietnam. Together, all the countries included within the framework represent 40% of the world GDP. The IPEF contains four pillars:

1. Connected Economy: through digital economy rules, data localization, AI, privacy.
2. Resilient Economy: through better supply chain commitments that better anticipate and prevent disruptions in supply chains.
3. Clean Economy: with commitments to sustainable energy, decarbonization, and green infrastructure.
4. Fair Economy: with recommendation to strengthen efforts to crack down on corruption, effective tax implementation, anti-money laundering, and anti-bribery regimes.

In 2026, Canada made a bid to become an associate member of the Indian Ocean Rim Association, despite having no Indian Ocean coastline. Their bid received support from India and is seen as reflecting their growing interest in the Indo-Pacific.

=== Gallery ===
Asia-Pacific Economic Cooperation members in 2026.

Comprehensive and Progressive Agreement for Trans-Pacific Partnership members in 2026.

Indo-Pacific Economic Framework for Prosperity members in 2026.

Indian Ocean Rim Association members in 2026. The countries highlighted in dark green are full members, while countries highlighted in light green are dialogue partners.

== Geopolitical context ==
=== Origins ===
Historical precedent for the Indo-Pacific as a politically contested space comes from ancient times; in the European colonial era, commercial interests led to conquest by powers such as the Dutch and British East India Companies throughout the region.

The German geopolitician Karl Haushofer first used "Indo-Pacific" in the 1920s in multiple works on geography and geopolitics: Geopolitics of the Pacific Ocean (1924), Building Blocks of Geopolitics (1928), Geopolitics of Pan-Ideas (1931), and German Cultural Politics in the Indo-Pacific Space (1939). Haushofer legitimated the integration of the two oceans by evidence in marine biology, oceanography, ethnography, and historical philology. He envisioned an "Indo-Pacific" comprising anticolonial forces in India and China, as Germany's ally against the maritime domination of Britain, the United States, and Western Europe.

The 1971 books Linguistics in Oceania and Linguistics in Oceania 2 proposed an Indo-Pacific language family involving the non-Austronesian languages of Papua New Guinea, Indonesia, Timor-Leste, the Solomon Islands, Tasmania and the Andaman Islands, with the books also providing overviews on the linguistics situation in the greater Indo-Pacific area. The geographic area covered in these books included insular regions in the Indian Ocean and Pacific Ocean, such as Australia, Melanesia, Micronesia, Polynesia, Indonesia, the Philippines, Taiwan, Madagascar, the Andaman and Nicobar Islands and the volcanic islands off the Pacific coast of Latin America, like the Galápagos Islands, Cocos Island, Malpelo Island and the Juan Fernández Islands. The books did not cover any areas of the American, Asian or African mainlands, in addition to not including certain insular areas in the Indian Ocean and Pacific Ocean, like the Aleutian Islands, the Japanese archipelago, Mauritius and Seychelles. The 2003 book Language Death and Language Maintenance: Theoretical, Practical and Descriptive Approaches used the term "Greater Pacific Area" to refer to this same linguistic region. The definition used in this book similarly included Australia, Melanesia, Micronesia, Polynesia, Indonesia, the Philippines and Taiwan, but it excluded all islands in the Indian Ocean, as well as the volcanic islands off the Pacific coast of Latin America. The definition in the book also covered non-tropical islands in the North Pacific, including the Japanese archipelago, Sakhalin, the Kuril Islands, the Aleutian Islands and the Bering Sea island of St. Lawrence Island.

=== Contemporary use ===
The Japanese Prime Minister Shinzō Abe referred to the "confluence" of the Indian and Pacific Oceans in his speech to the Indian Parliament in August 2007 as "the dynamic coupling as seas of freedom and of prosperity" in the "broader Asia". The focus of the Japanese Prime Minister's August 2007 speech in the Indian Parliament was on security of sea lanes linking the two oceans. In the academic discourse relating to such maritime security issue in the Indo-Pacific, the first articulation was carried by a paper published in January 2007 by the Institute of Defense Studies and Analyses (IDSA), New Delhi. It was a result of consultations between IDSA and the Japan Institute of International Affairs (JIIA) held in New Delhi in October 2006. From 2010 onwards, the term Indo-Pacific acquired salience within the Indian government and has since been used often by India's apex political leadership. From about 2011 onwards, the term has been used frequently by strategic analysts and high-level government/military leadership in Australia, Japan and the United States to denote said region. However, a formal/official documented articulation of the term first appeared in Australia's Defence White Paper, 2013. It is also "symbiotically linked" with the Quadrilateral Security Dialogue—an informal grouping of like-minded democracies in the region, comprising Australia, India, Japan, and the United States.

Since 2011, the term "Indo-Pacific" is being used increasingly in geopolitical discourse.

In 2013, Indonesian Foreign Minister Marty Natalegawa proposed an "Indo-Pacific Treaty of Friendship and Cooperation" to restore trust, manage unresolved territory disputes, and help countries deal with change in the region. In 2013, U.S. officials have begun using the term "Indo-Asia Pacific".

The term's profile was raised when it found mention in the joint statement issued by the Indian Prime Minister Narendra Modi and United States President Donald Trump after the former's state visit to the White House on 26 June 2017. "As responsible stewards in the Indo-Pacific region, President Trump and Prime Minister Modi agreed that a close partnership between the United States and India is central to peace and stability in the region. In marking 70 years of diplomatic relations between India and the United States, the leaders resolved to expand and deepen the strategic partnership between the countries and advance common objectives. Above all, these objectives include combatting terrorist threats, promoting stability across the Indo-Pacific region, increasing free and fair trade, and strengthening energy linkages". However, President Trump's November 2017 articulation on Indo-Pacific was widely seen as something that would usher in a new (US–China) Cold War. This led to the Indian Prime Minister spelling out the Indian vision of Indo-Pacific as an enabler for "a common pursuit of progress and prosperity... not directed against any country... (albeit based on) our principled commitment to rule of law". According to Dr. Cenk Tamer, the U.S. seeks to create an "anti-China axis" in the Asia-Pacific region through the conceptualization of the Indo-Pacific because it sees India as a key part in containing China. This was reiterated by President Biden, who declared a "secure and prosperous Indo-Pacific." Tamer calls the Indo-Pacific a concept that started to gain ground in international relations as a geopolitical challenge by the U.S. toward China.

In 2019, the United States Department of State published a document formalizing the concept of a "Free and Open Indo-Pacific", to be sustained among members of "the Quad", a partnership of four Indo-Pacific democracies led by the United States, in concert with Australia, India, and Japan. "Indo-Pacific" has also featured prominently in top-level U.S. strategic documents such as the 2017 National Security Strategy, the 2018 Nuclear Posture Review, and the 2018 National Defense Strategy. According to Felix Heiduk and Gudrun Wacker at the German Institute for International and Security Affairs, the concept of a "Free and Open Indo-Pacific" is aimed at containing China and the "Indo-Pacific" is "primarily understood as a U.S.-led containment strategy directed against China" in Beijing. Australian scholar Rory Medcalf has argued that "The Indo-Pacific...does not exclude or contain China, though it does dilute China's influence." It has been argued that the concept of the Indo-Pacific may lead to a change in popular "mental maps" of how the world is understood in strategic terms.

The term was also used in 2019 by the Association of Southeast Asian Nations (ASEAN) in its statement ASEAN Outlook on the Indo-Pacific (AOIP), though the bloc also still uses the longstanding term "Asia-Pacific" which is preferred by China and Russia. Its use by ASEAN is arguably an attempt by the bloc at balance-of-power hedging between competing visions for the region between the US and China. However, it is also clear that ASEAN does not share the exact same understanding of the term as the US, and its AOIP statement specifically states that it envisions continuing to play a "central and strategic role" in the region.

In order to reduce its dependence on the Indo-Pacific, China has begun pivoting to the "Arcto-Pacific", aiming to use northern routes that are opening up due to climate change.

Several state actors have published Indo-Pacific strategies, including the European Union (EU) in September 2021. In February 2022, the U.S. government released its official Indo-Pacific strategy, while in November of that year, the Canadian government released its own Indo-Pacific strategy. Canada have been described as walking a "diplomatic tightrope" in the Indo-Pacific, since they have attempted to align themselves with both China and U.S. allies like Japan.

Pacific Island country leaders have prioritized terms such as "Blue Pacific" and "Blue Continent" over Indo-Pacific and Asia-Pacific, which are seen as potentially marginalizing them. The "Blue Pacific" identity was officially endorsed at the 48th Pacific Islands Forum meeting in Apia, Samoa, in September 2017. By 2019, the language among leaders shifted toward "Blue Pacific Continent". Australia and New Zealand, the two largest countries in the PIF, have engaged with the Blue Pacific Continent concept, while still using Indo-Pacific frameworks for broader regional contexts beyond the South Pacific area. Non-PIF members such as Japan, the United Kingdom and the United States have also engaged with the concept. German political scientist Patrick Köllner wrote in 2021 that New Zealand only views itself as being a regional power in the South Pacific, while Australia views itself as both a regional power in the South Pacific and a middle power in the Indo-Pacific. In 2023. Fiji’s Prime Minister, Sitiveni Rabuka, proposed a declaration titled "Ocean of Peace", and it was endorsed at the PIF Leaders Meeting at the Solomon Islands in September 2025. At a Japan-Fiji summit meeting and signing ceremony in November 2025, the "Ocean of Peace" declaration was regarded to share the same principles as Japan's "Free and Open Indo-Pacific (FOIP)" such as respect for sovereignty and maintaining a rules-based international order, and the two countries affirmed their cooperation toward the realization of a FOIP.

The Indo-Pacific concept is yet not widely acknowledged amongst the governments of Latin American countries or Middle Eastern countries, countries which themselves are included under maximalist frameworks. As of 2023, no Middle Eastern country in the Gulf region had issued any official Indo-Pacific policy, with few leaders using the concept in public remarks. Much of Chile's Indo-Pacific strategy is expressed through the South Pacific Defense Ministers' Meeting (SPDMM), which it annually holds with officials from other countries bordering the South Pacific, including Australia, Fiji, New Zealand, Papua New Guinea, Tonga and France (who are considered a South Pacific country due to their various South Pacific territories). Colombia has not issued a relevant national or regional policy on the Indo-Pacific, although in 2022 its government ministers emphasized the key roles of India, Australia and New Zealand in the region, while promoting the inclusion of Latin America within the Indo-Pacific vision of Australia's and New Zealand's foreign policy. On 2 March 2022, the foreign ministers of Colombia and Japan also held a video conference and confirmed that the two Pacific-facing countries would expand their cooperation to realise the concept of a Free and Open Indo-Pacific. Since 2013, Mexico have been members of a middle power grouping known as MIKTA, which also includes Australia, Indonesia, South Korea and Turkey. MIKTA is seen by Mexican authors as one of Mexico's primary forms of engagement with the rest of the Pacific Rim, along with their membership in APEC and the CPTPP. Additionally, since 2011, Mexico, Chile, Colombia and Peru have been founding members of the Pacific Alliance, an organization which seeks to create stronger integration between the Pacific states of Latin America and the rest of the Pacific Rim. Singapore became the first external country to receive Associated State status in the Pacific Alliance, with other non-Latin American Pacific Rim countries like Australia, Canada, New Zealand and South Korea also currently candidates for Associated State status. Rather than the "Indo-Pacific", there is an emerging concept among Latin American countries known as the "Latin Pacific" (Latino-Pacífico). The narrative portrays Latin America as an active and strategic player in the Pacific rather than a distant region. It emphasizes the region’s vital resources, such as critical minerals, food surpluses, renewable energy potential, biodiversity, and its strategic geographic location, and aims to transform these into capabilities that enable Latin American countries to exert influence in global affairs. The "Latin Pacific" concept has been compared to the "Blue Pacific" concept among Pacific Island states, since they both illustrate the different ways in which countries can conceptualize themselves in relation to this region.

=== Reception of the term ===
The Australian Citizens Party, a minor party associated with the US-led Rouche movement, criticises the "Indo-Pacific" vision as a reenactment of Nazi strategy, given the concept's link to Karl Haushofer.

Former Prime Minister of Australia Paul Keating, in a televised address at the National Press Club, criticised the notion of the "Indo-Pacific" as a construct of the United States in its diplomatic war with China:

The United States says, well, that's all very interesting. But look, if you behave yourself, you Chinese. You can be a stakeholder in our system. And look, you wouldn't have to be Xi Jinping or anybody, to take the view of your Chinese Nationalist say, "Well, hang on, let me get this right. We are already one and a quarter times bigger than you, will soon be twice as big as you, and we may be two and a half times as big as you. But we can be a stakeholder in your system, is that it?" I mean, it'd make a cat laugh.

==== Definitional ambiguity ====
Others have criticized the term for being overly broad, since under a maximalist definition, it encompasses every country with a Pacific or Indian Ocean coastline (including those in East Africa and the Western Americas) which accounts for 74 of all 194 independent countries, 65% of earth's total surface and a population of over five billion (three quarters of earth's total population). The maximalist definition is used by Indian Prime Minister Modi, who in 2018 defined the Indo-Pacific as encompassing any country with a Pacific or Indian Ocean coastline, including those in the Middle East, who are often treated as a separate geopolitical zone. The maximalist definition is also used by the government of Japan, which in 2021 defined the Indo-Pacific as including East Africa, the Western Americas and all areas in between, such as the Indian Ocean-facing Middle East. On the other hand, the governments of the United States and Australia have defined anything west of Pakistan as not being part of the Indo-Pacific. They also define the United States as being the only country in the Americas belonging to the Indo-Pacific regional framework, with the United States explicitly defining itself as an "Indo-Pacific nation". In 2018, U.S. Secretary of Defense Jim Mattis described the Indo-Pacific as stretching from "Bollywood to Hollywood", referencing how the Hollywood film industry is located in the U.S. Pacific state of California, while India's Bollywood film industry is located on the opposite end of the U.S.-defined Indo-Pacific. Some wider definitions which include East Africa and the Middle East still do not include any of the countries of the Western Americas, instead ending the region at the Pacific Islands. The French government's official definition includes all their Pacific and Indian Ocean territories, ranging from the archipelago of Mayotte, which is close to the coast of East Africa, to the Pacific atoll of Clipperton Island, which is 1,100 kilometers from Mexico. Their definition encompasses mainland East Africa but not the mainland Western Americas. Their definition also does not include Russia. The Canadian government's official definition defines the Indo-Pacific as ranging from South Asia to the Pacific Islands, and encompasses 40 countries, excluding all countries from East Africa, the Middle East and the Western Americas, as well as Russia. The Czech Republic's definition similarly includes 40 countries, excluding the same regions as Canada's definition. Lithuania uses roughly the same definition as Canada and the Czech Republic. ASEAN avoids a fixed geographic definition of the Indo-Pacific, but emphasizes Southeast Asia’s centrality due to its location between the Indian and Pacific oceans.

Some have argued that the widest definition of the Indo-Pacific, stretching from East Africa to the Western Americas, should be thought of as a collection of various different subregions, rather than as one singular "super region" like with the older term "Asia-Pacific". This way, each subregion is acknowledged as having its own unique geopolitical dynamics. Countries on the western or eastern edges of the maximalist definition, like South Africa and the 11 Latin American Pacific countries, are also considered by some to be "peripheral" or "unconventional" actors in the Indo-Pacific, since they are not currently part of the strategic visions of some key countries like Australia and the United States. Critics argue that India and Japan's maximalist definitions risk diluting strategic focus by including peripheral, non-core areas such as South Africa.

=== Geopolitical inclusions ===
The following political entities are included in the widest geopolitical definition of the Indo-Pacific, which interprets the space to include all areas bordering the Pacific Ocean and Indian Ocean, or their marginal seas, bays, gulfs, and straits:

==== Africa ====
- Comoros (connected to Indian Ocean)
- Djibouti (connected to Indian Ocean)
- Egypt (connected to Indian Ocean)
- Eritrea (connected to Indian Ocean)
- Kenya (connected to Indian Ocean)
- Madagascar (connected to Indian Ocean)
- Mayotte (connected to Indian Ocean)
- Mozambique (connected to Indian Ocean)
- Somalia (connected to Indian Ocean)
- Somaliland (connected to Indian Ocean)
- South Africa (connected to Indian Ocean)
- Sudan (connected to Indian Ocean)
- Tanzania (connected to Indian Ocean)

==== Middle East ====
- Bahrain (connected to Indian Ocean)
- Iran (connected to Indian Ocean)
- Iraq (connected to Indian Ocean)
- Israel (connected to Indian Ocean)
- Jordan (connected to Indian Ocean)
- Kuwait (connected to Indian Ocean)
- Oman (connected to Indian Ocean)
- Qatar (connected to Indian Ocean)
- Saudi Arabia (connected to Indian Ocean)
- United Arab Emirates (connected to Indian Ocean)
- Yemen (connected to Indian Ocean)

==== Indian Ocean ====
- British Indian Ocean Territory
- Christmas Island
- Cocos (Keeling) Islands
- French Southern and Antarctic Lands
- Heard Island and McDonald Islands
- Maldives
- Mauritius
- Réunion
- Seychelles

==== Asia ====
- Bangladesh (connected to Indian Ocean)
- Brunei (connected to Pacific Ocean)
- Cambodia (connected to Pacific Ocean)
- China (connected to Pacific Ocean)
- Hong Kong (connected to Pacific Ocean)
- India (connected to Indian Ocean)
- Indonesia (connected to Pacific Ocean and Indian Ocean)
- Japan (connected to Pacific Ocean)
- Macau (connected to Pacific Ocean)
- Malaysia (connected to Pacific Ocean and Indian Ocean)
- Myanmar (connected to Indian Ocean)
- North Korea (connected to Pacific Ocean)
- Pakistan (connected to Indian Ocean)
- Philippines (connected to Pacific Ocean)
- Russia (connected to Pacific Ocean)
- Singapore (connected to Pacific Ocean and Indian Ocean)
- Sri Lanka (connected to Indian Ocean)
- South Korea (connected to Pacific Ocean)
- Taiwan (connected to Pacific Ocean)
- Thailand (connected to Pacific Ocean and Indian Ocean)
- Timor-Leste (connected to Pacific Ocean and Indian Ocean)
- Vietnam (connected to Pacific Ocean)

==== Pacific Ocean/Oceania ====
- American Samoa
- Australia (connected to Pacific Ocean and Indian Ocean)
- Baker Island
- Bonin Islands
- Bougainville
- Clipperton Island
- Cook Islands
- Coral Sea Islands
- Easter Island
- Federated States of Micronesia
- Fiji
- French Polynesia
- Galápagos Islands
- Guam
- Hawaii
- Howland Island
- Jarvis Island
- Johnston Atoll
- Juan Fernández Islands
- Kingman Reef
- Kiribati
- Marshall Islands
- Midway Atoll
- Nauru
- New Caledonia
- New Zealand
- Niue
- Norfolk Island
- Northern Mariana Islands
- Palau
- Palmyra Atoll
- Papua New Guinea
- Pitcairn Islands
- Samoa
- Solomon Islands
- Tokelau
- Tonga
- Tuvalu
- Vanuatu
- Volcano Islands
- Wake Island
- Wallis and Futuna
- West Papua

==== Americas ====
- Canada (connected to Pacific Ocean)
- Chile (connected to Pacific Ocean)
- Colombia (connected to Pacific Ocean)
- Costa Rica (connected to Pacific Ocean)
- Ecuador (connected to Pacific Ocean)
- El Salvador (connected to Pacific Ocean)
- Guatemala (connected to Pacific Ocean)
- Honduras (connected to Pacific Ocean)
- Mexico (connected to Pacific Ocean)
- Nicaragua (connected to Pacific Ocean)
- Panama (connected to Pacific Ocean)
- Peru (connected to Pacific Ocean)
- United States (connected to Pacific Ocean)

== Demographics and geography (maximalist geopolitical definition) ==
Under a maximalist geopolitical definition of the Indo-Pacific, the population of the area is highly concentrated in a small number of countries. According to the United Nations World Population Prospects 2024, the largest populations within this broad Indo-Pacific grouping in 2024 were those of India (about 1.45 billion), China (1.42 billion), the United States (345 million), Indonesia (283 million), Pakistan (251 million), Bangladesh (174 million), Russia (145 million), Mexico (131 million), Japan (124 million) and the Philippines (about 116 million). Population density is consequently very uneven, ranging from the densely settled megacities of South and East Asia to sparsely populated areas like Australia and Canada.

The maximalist grouping spans a very wide range of territorial size. By land area, Russia, Canada, the United States and China are among its largest countries. At the opposite extreme, the Pacific and Indian Ocean island states include some of the world's smallest countries by land area, such as Nauru, Tuvalu, the Marshall Islands, Palau and the Seychelles. The maximalist Indo-Pacific also contains several larger insular states situated in the Indian Ocean and Pacific Oceans. Among the countries within the maximalist definition that have no international land borders are Australia, Bahrain, Comoros, Federated States of Micronesia, Fiji, Japan, Kiribati, Madagascar, Maldives, Marshall Islands, Mauritius, Nauru, New Zealand, Palau, Philippines, Samoa, Seychelles, Singapore, Solomon Islands, Sri Lanka, Tonga, Tuvalu and Vanuatu, as well as the disputed state of Taiwan and the self-governing Cook Islands and Niue. Most of these states are situated wholly within either the Indian Ocean or Pacific Ocean systems. The Indian Ocean group includes Bahrain, Comoros, Madagascar, Maldives, Mauritius, Seychelles and Sri Lanka, while Federated States of Micronesia, Fiji, Japan, Kiribati, the Marshall Islands, New Zealand, Palau, the Philippines, Samoa, Solomon Islands, Tonga, Tuvalu and Vanuatu are Pacific states. The Cook Islands, Niue and Taiwan also lie in the Pacific. Australia has coastlines on both the Indian and Pacific oceans and is the largest country in the world without an international land border. Singapore occupies a maritime position between the Indian Ocean and western Pacific systems through the Strait of Malacca and the South China Sea. Several Indo-Pacific states are geographically divided island countries, with their territory sharing one or more islands with another sovereign state. Indonesia shares New Guinea with Papua New Guinea, Borneo with Malaysia and Brunei, and the island of Timor with Timor-Leste.

In 2024, the largest economies in the maximalist Indo-Pacific grouping by nominal gross domestic product were the United States (about US$30.77 trillion), China (US$19.50 trillion), Japan (US$4.44 trillion), India (US$3.96 trillion), Russia (US$2.56 trillion), Canada (US$2.32 trillion), South Korea (US$1.87 trillion), Mexico (US$1.83 trillion), Australia (US$1.80 trillion) and Indonesia (US$1.45 trillion). The smallest economies include several Pacific island states in Micronesia; 2024 nominal GDP was approximately US$176 million in Nauru, US$308 million in the Marshall Islands, US$345 million in Palau and US$349 million in Kiribati. The Polynesian state of Tuvalu, which is increasingly affected by rising sea levels, had the lowest GDP in the world in 2024, with a nominal GDP of US$57 million. Nauru, which was under Australian administration beginning in 1914, had one of the highest GDP per capitas in the world after becoming an independent country in 1968. This was due to its lucrative phosphate industry; it eventually suffered an economic collapse in the 1980s, following a decline in its phosphate and misguided financial decisions. Before the economic collapse, Nauru was earning 70 times more than its island neighbors were. During this time, Nauru's government spent money on a London West End musical and lost over a billion dollars on lavish property development projects in Australia, Hawaii and the Philippines. The Nauru House in Melbourne was briefly the city's tallest building, and had to be sold by the government of Nauru to pay off debts. Since 2001, Nauru has received income from Australia by hosting detained asylum seekers, while other low income Micronesian countries such as the Federated States of Micronesia, the Marshall Islands and Palau receive economic benefits from the United States via a Compact of Free Association. This Compact of Free Association allows the United States strategic military access to the islands. Kiribati, which is not part of the Compact of Free Association with the United States, has historically relied more heavily on aid from Australia. Australia accounts for roughly 31% of all external development support to Kiribati, with the next two largest donors being New Zealand and Japan.

Religiously, the region is exceptionally diverse under the maximalist definition, and contains the world's major religious traditions. Islam predominates across the Middle East and in several populous South and Southeast Asian countries, including Pakistan, Bangladesh, Indonesia and Malaysia. Indonesia has the world's largest Muslim population, while India, despite having a large Muslim minority, is predominantly Hindu. Buddhism is predominant in countries such as Thailand, Myanmar, Sri Lanka and Cambodia, while Buddhist and other East Asian traditions have historically had a presence in Japan, China, South Korea and elsewhere. Christianity predominates across much of Oceania and the Pacific-facing Americas, and is also a major religion in the Philippines, Russia, Timor-Leste and parts of East Africa. Australia, China, Japan, New Zealand, North Korea, South Korea and Vietnam also contain substantial populations identifying as religiously unaffiliated; in 2020, about 90% of China's population was estimated to be religiously unaffiliated, with the majority of New Zealand's population likewise being unaffiliated. Israel and the United States, which are located at opposite ends of the Indo-Pacific in the maximalist definition, had the two largest Jewish populations in the world in 2024.

Sport is a major element of popular culture throughout the Indo-Pacific, but patterns of popularity vary substantially between sub-regions. Association football (soccer) has the widest geographic reach, with particularly strong followings in the Middle East, East Africa, Southeast Asia, East Asia and the Pacific-facing countries of Latin America. FIFA has estimated a global football following of around five billion people. Cricket is especially prominent in South Asia and is also an important sport in Australia, New Zealand, South Africa and other parts of eastern Africa. India is the largest center of cricket's commercial and viewing audience. During the 2025 ICC Champions Trophy, the final between India and New Zealand drew approximately 230 million viewers in India across television and digital platforms, while total tournament watch time in India reached about 250 billion minutes. Rugby union has particularly strong cultural importance in New Zealand, Fiji, Samoa, Tonga and South Africa, while Australia and Japan also have established rugby traditions. Rugby league is prominent in Papua New Guinea and parts of Australia. Other sports have similarity regional distributions. Australian rules football is deeply established in parts of Australia, while American football is the dominant form of professional football in the United States. Outside of Australia, Australian rules football has also been the national sport of Nauru since its independence in 1968.

=== Indo-Pacific languages (maximalist geopolitical definition) ===
The United States government estimate that over 3,000 languages are spoken throughout the Indo-Pacific under their minimalist definition, which excludes East Africa, the Middle East and all of the Western Americas besides the United States itself. Under a maximalist definition, the Indo-Pacific encompasses an even larger range of languages. In his 1986 book The Papuan Languages of New Guinea, William A. Foley wrote that the Pacific Basin alone contained 1,500 languages, and he defined it as excluding the coastal areas of mainland Asia and the Americas. He categorized Australian, Austronesian and Papuan languages as the three main language groups of the Pacific Basin.

==== Mainland East Africa, Middle East and mainland Asia ====
Arabic is the principal or official language across Egypt, Iraq, Jordan, Kuwait, Oman, Qatar, Saudi Arabia, Sudan, the United Arab Emirates and Yemen, while Persian is the principal language of Iran and Hebrew is the language of the State of Israel. Somali is predominant in Somalia and Somaliland and is one of the principal languages of Djibouti. Tigrinya is the most widely spoken language in Eritrea. Swahili is a principal lingua franca in Kenya and Tanzania. Zulu is the language most frequently spoken in South African households, with English also widely understood. Portuguese is the official language of Mozambique.

In South Asia, Bengali is predominant in Bangladesh and is one of the major languages of India. Hindi is the largest language by number of mother-tongue speakers in India. Punjabi is the largest mother tongue in Pakistan. Mandarin is predominant in China, which also has major regional varieties such as Cantonese, Wu, Min, Hakka and Xiang, as well as Indigenous and minority languages including Tibetan, Uyghur, Mongolian, Kazakh, Korean and Zhuang. Cantonese is predominant in Hong Kong's Kowloon and New Territories and is the principal Chinese variety used in Macau, with Portuguese having also historically been important in Macau. Kowloon and New Territories also have minority languages like Hakka and Tanka. Malay is the national language of Malaysia, Burmese is predominant in Myanmar, Khmer in Cambodia, Thai in Thailand, and Vietnamese in Vietnam. Cambodia, Thailand and Vietnam also have various Indigenous and minority languages, including Bunong, Jarai and Kuy in Cambodia, Isan, Northern Thai, Southern Thai, Malay and Karen languages in Thailand and Khmer, Hmong, Cham, Tày, Nùng and Jarai in Vietnam. Russia is predominant in both the Russian Far East and the European regions of Russia.

North Korea and South Korea are both overwhelmingly Korean-speaking. Korean is the sole official language of South Korea (spoken by over 51 million residents) and North Korea, and they are two of the most linguistically uniform nations in the world. Following the division of Korea, the two countries developed distinct standard varieties of Korean, known as P'yojuno (표준어) in South Korea and Munhwaŏ (문화어) in North Korea. Although the varieties share the same linguistic foundations, they differ in pronunciation, orthography and vocabulary, partly as a result of geographical separation and divergent language policies. In South Korea, English also holds significant presence as the most widely taught foreign language, with nearly all Koreans under 40 having received formal English instruction as a compulsory subject through the national school curriculum. Japanese is spoken notably by older generations, a legacy of Japan's colonial rule from 1910 to 1945.

==== Indian Ocean islands ====
English is the official administrative language in the British Indian Ocean Territory and the uninhabited Heard Island and McDonald Islands (part of Australia). French is the official administrative language of the uninhabited French Southern and Antarctic Lands, which contains the Kerguelen Islands in the Indian Ocean. English is spoken on Australia's inhabited Christmas Island, while Australia's Cocos (Keeling) Islands are predominantly Malay-speaking, reflecting histories of settlement from outside Australia. French is spoken on France's Indian Ocean territories Mayotte and Réunion. The Shimaore and Kibushi languages are also spoken on Mayotte. Mauritian Creole is the predominant everyday language in Mauritius alongside French and English, while Seychelles recognizes Seychellois Creole, English and French as its three national languages. Malagasy is predominant in Madagascar, Comorian is the most widely spoken language in the Comoros and Bahrain is Arabic-speaking.

Sinhala is the largest language in Sri Lanka, alongside Tamil as another major national language. Dhivehi (also known as Maldivian) is the national and predominant language of the Maldives. It has substantial regional variation, particularly in the Huvadhu, Fuvahmulah and Addu dialects of the southern atolls, which differ considerably from the standard variety spoken in Malé. On India's Lakshadweep archipelago, the Jeseri language is spoken on several islands. India's Andaman and Nicobar Islands are home to several distinct Indigenous language groups, including Great Andamanese, Jarawa, Onge, Nicobarese, and Shompen. North Sentinel Island is part of the Andaman and Nicobar Islands, and the Sentinelese language remains essentially undocumented and unclassified. Some scholars have suggested that it may be related to the Ongan languages, particularly Jarawa and Onge, while others have regarded any such classification as speculative. Since the first recorded encounters with the inhabitants in the 19th century, attempts at sustained contact have repeatedly met with resistance or hostility, and the first documented peaceful contact did not occur until 1991; the resulting isolation has left the language largely inaccessible to linguistic study.

Socotra is the main island of Yemen's Socotra Archipelago, and its principle Indigenous language is Soqotri, a Modern South Arabian language belonging to the Semitic branch of the Afroasiatic language family. Arabic is widely used in government, education and public life, while Soqotri remains important in family and community interactions; the language contains several regional dialects and faces increasing pressure from Arabic. The smaller inhabited islands of Abd al Kuri and Samhah are also home to Soqotri-speaking communities. The variety spoken on Abd al Kuri differs substantially from other Soqotri dialects, while the variety spoken on Samhah has been classified as belonging to the western dialects of Soqotri spoken on the main island.

==== Western Pacific islands ====
Indonesian is the national and official language of Indonesia and is used throughout the country, including on West Papua in the western half of New Guinea. Tetum and Portuguese are the principal official languages of Timor-Leste. Filipino and English are the official languages of the Philippines, with Spanish having once been the official language of the country. Indonesia, Timor-Leste and the Philippines have a large number of regional and minority languages, including Javanese, Sundanese, Madurese, Balinese and Acehnese in Indonesia, Tetum, Mambai, Makasae and Fataluku in Timor-Leste and Cebuano, Ilocano and Hiligaynon in the Philippines.

Brunei has Malay as the national language, with the variant Brunei Malay being the most widely spoken. Borneo is one of the largest islands in the world, and is split between Brunei, Indonesia and the mainland Asian country Malaysia. Along with Malay and Brunei Malay, other languages spoken on Borneo include Iban, Banjarese, Dusun, Sama-Bajau languages, and Bidayuh; these languages belong predominantly to the Austronesian language family. In Singapore, English, Malay, Mandarin Chinese and Tamil are official languages, with English serving as the principal working language. Hong Kong Island has historically had a stronger English-language influence than Kowloon and New Territories on the Asian mainland, as Hong Kong Island used to be the administrative center of Hong Kong during the period of British rule (1841–1997). The main local language of China's Zhoushan Archipelago is Zhoushan speech (舟山话), a variety of Wu Chinese belonging to the Northern Wu group and closely related to the Ningbo dialect. The Chinese island Hainan is home to Hainanese, Hlai languages including Jiamao and Cun, Lingao, Miao, Mandarin, and Tsat, the latter being an Austronesian Chamic language. Mandarin is the principal language of Taiwan. Other languages on Taiwan include Taiwanese Hokkien and Hakka, together with numerous Indigenous Austronesian languages such as Amis, Atayal, Paiwan and Bunun. Japanese is predominant in Japan and the Bonin/Volcano Islands, with Ryukyuan languages also being spoken on the Ryukyu Islands, and Ainu on Hokkaido. The Ainu language has become critically endangered on Hokkaido, with an estimated 80% chance of going extinct.

==== North Pacific islands ====
Russia's Sakhalin historically and currently has languages including Nivkh, Ainu (historically), Orok and Evenki, with Russian now being dominant. Ainu was historically spoken on Russia's volcanic Kuril Islands, which are located to the north of Hokkaido and now mainly Russian-speaking. To the east of the Kuril Islands are Alaska's volcanic Aleutian Islands in the North Pacific and Bering Sea, and on these islands Unangam Tunuu (Aleut) is the historical Indigenous language, with English now also dominant. The Pribilof Islands in the central Bering Sea are part of Alaska and speak a regional variant of Unangam Tunuu, with English similarly now also being dominant. Other native languages have traditionally been spoken on the rest of the Alaskan Bering Sea islands, which now also speak English. St. Lawrence Island in the northern Bering Sea is associated with Siberian Yupik, while the traditional language spoken on Nunivak Island in the southern Bering Sea is Cup'ig (also spelled Cup'ik), which is a distinct regional dialect of the Central Alaskan Yupʼik. On Little Diomede Island in the Bering Strait, the local Indigenous language is Iñupiaq, specifically the Bering Strait variant, which is also spoken in nearby Bering Strait communities. The Kodiak Archipelago is situated in the Gulf of Alaska in the North Pacific, and includes Kodiak Island and other islands. Kodiak Island and Afognak Island are traditionally associated with Alutiiq, specifically the Koniag dialect of the language. Alutiiq is a Pacific Gulf variety of the Yupik languages, with Koniag Alutiiq spoken on Kodiak Island and historically on Afognak Island, prior to its abandonment after the 1964 Alaska earthquake.

==== South Pacific and central Pacific islands ====
Across Oceania, English is predominant in Australia, Guam, Hawaii, Lord Howe Island, New Zealand, Norfolk Island and Tasmania. Chamorro is the principle Indigenous language in Guam, Hawaiian in Hawaii and Māori in New Zealand. In addition to speaking English, Norfolk Island has also developed a distinctive Norf'k language. The Indigenous Moriori people of New Zealand's Chatham Island and Pitt Island traditionally spoke the Moriori language, a Polynesian language distinct from, but closely related to, Māori. Australia retains a large number of Aboriginal and Torres Strait Islander languages, including Pitjantjatjara, Warlpiri, Arrernte, Djambarrpuyngu, Tiwi and Yolŋu Matha, as well as Australian Kriol and Torres Strait Creole. Tasmania and its outlying islands formerly contained numerous Indigenous languages, with estimates generally ranging from about eight to twelve or more, rather than a single Tasmanian language. Colonization caused all of the original languages to cease being transmitted as complete community languages. The modern palawa kani language was reconstructed from surviving wordlists, historical records and remembered material from several of these original languages, and is now used in Aboriginal communities across Tasmania and on the Bass Strait islands. The Ngugi people are native to Moreton Island off Australia's subtropical Pacific coast, and traditionally spoke Guwar, a now extinct Aboriginal language which developed on the island. The origins of the language remain debated but some group it with the Bandjalangic languages and Yagara.

Samoan is predominant in American Samoa and Samoa, Fijian is a principal language of Fiji, alongside English and Fiji Hindi, Cook Islands Māori is predominant in the Cook Islands, Niuean is predominant in Niue, where English is also used, Tokelauan is predominant in Tokelau, Tongan in Tonga, and Pitkern is used alongside English in the Pitcairn Islands. English and the Indigenous language Tuvaluan are the joint official languages of Tuvalu, with Tuvaluan being closely related to the Polynesian languages Samoan and Tokelauan.

In Micronesia, Gilbertese is predominant in Kiribati, Marshallese is predominant in the Marshall Islands, Nauruan is predominant in Nauru, Palauan is predominant in Palau, and Chuukese is the largest Indigenous language of the Federated States of Micronesia, with other major languages including Pohnpeian, Kosraean and Yapese. English and the Indigenous languages Carolinian and Chamorro are the official languages of the Northern Mariana Islands, with Chamorro and English being the second and third most widely spoken languages. Filipino languages are the most widely spoken on the islands, due to large waves of migration from the Philippines. In some areas of Micronesia, like the Federated States of Micronesia, Guam, the Northern Mariana Islands and Palau, Japanese is or was spoken by older generations, as a result of Japan's colonial rule over much of the region between World War I and World War II. In Melanesia, the Solomon Islands uses English officially but Solomon Islands Pijin is the principal lingua franca alongside numerous Indigenous languages, while Vanuatu has three official languages—English, French and Bislama—as well as more than 100 Indigenous Oceanic languages. Tok Pisin of Papua New Guinea is widely used in its breakaway region of Bougainville. Papua New Guinea, which occupies the eastern half of New Guinea, is one of the world's most linguistically diverse countries. Tok Pisin, English and Hiri Motu are major official languages along with more than 800 Indigenous languages, including numerous Trans–New Guinea languages, Sepik, Austronesian and other language groups. French is the principal administrative language of New Caledonia, French Polynesia, and is used alongside Wallisian and Futunan in Wallis and Futuna. New Caledonia also has a large number of Kanak languages, including Drehu, Nengone, Paicî, Ajië and Xârâcùù, while French Polynesia also has Tahitian and other Marquesan, Tuamotuan and Austral Island Polynesian varieties.

In the central Pacific, the largely uninhabited U.S. islands of Baker Island, Howland Island, Jarvis Island, Johnston Atoll, Kingman Reef, Midway Atoll, Palmyra Atoll and Wake Island administratively use English. On Australia's Coral Sea Islands and Macquarie Island, English is also used for administration. Macquarie Island is uninhabited and the Coral Sea Islands are also uninhabited apart from personnel on Willis Island.

==== Eastern Pacific islands ====
French is the administrative language of the uninhabited Clipperton Island in the eastern Pacific, while Spanish is the administrative language in several other uninhabited volcanic islands in the eastern Pacific, such as Chile's Desventuradas Islands and Salas y Gómez Island, Colombia's Malpelo Island, Costa Rica's Cocos Island and Mexico's Revillagigedo Islands. Among inhabited volcanic eastern Pacific islands, Spanish is spoken on the Galápagos Islands (Ecuador), Guadalupe Island (Mexico) and Easter Island and the Juan Fernández Islands (Chile), with Easter Island also speaking the Indigenous Rapa Nui language. No Indigenous languages exist on any of the other islands, as they were all discovered unoccupied by Europeans.

Outside of these remote volcanic islands, the eastern Pacific also contains numerous larger islands of continental origin. Canada's Haida Gwaii is the historic homeland of the Haida people, and the Haida language remains the principal Indigenous language associated with the archipelago, with Haida and English now being recognized as the dual official languages of the Haida Nation. Canada's Vancouver Island is predominantly English-speaking and is home to a large number of unrelated Indigenous languages which are spread across the island, including Ditidaht, Hul’q’umi’num’, Kwak'wala, Nuu-chah-nulth, and SENĆOŦEN. Southern Alaska's Alexander Archipelago is located near Canada and has over 1,100 islands; Indigenous languages on the islands include Haida, Tsimshian and the dominant Tlingit. Washington State's San Juan Islands have historically had Indigenous Coast Salish languages spoken by communities such as the Lummi, Samish, Saanich and Songhees. Southern California's Channel Islands are now mostly English-speaking, and were home to Indigenous languages from the Chumash and Uto-Aztecan families, including the extinct Nicoleño language on San Nicolas Island, which is classified within the Uto-Aztecan family. English has historically been spoken on San Francisco's Farallon Islands. They have no island-specific Indigenous languages but were known to the Coast Miwok peoples of San Francisco. Alcatraz Island in the San Francisco Bay was similarly within the traditional territory of the Ramaytush peoples, but developed as an English-speaking island, particularly during its use as a prison between 1859 and 1963.

On continental Mexican islands in the Gulf of California, Indigenous languages are principally associated with the Seri people, whose traditional territory included Tiburón Island, San Esteban Island and the adjacent coast of Sonora. The Seri language (Cmiique Iitom) is a language isolate, with no demonstrated genealogical relationship to any other language family; the National Institute of Indigenous Languages (INALI) recognizes it as the sole language in the Seri linguistic family. Tiburón Island and San Esteban Island are now uninhabited, but Tiburón remains communally owned by the Seri people and is regarded by them as a sacred place. The wider Gulf of California contains numerous other islands like Isla Ángel de la Guarda, but most are uninhabited or lack evidence of long-term island-specific language communities. The continental Tres Marías Islands are located roughly 100 kilometers off Mexico's open Pacific coast and were discovered uninhabited in the 16th century, with no evidence of any prior Indigenous activity. Spanish was subsequently adopted on the islands, with Isla María Madre serving as a federal penal colony between 1905 and 2019. Colombia's Gorgona Island is believed to have had prehistoric activity from nearby Indigenous populations, but there is no evidence for a surviving island-specific Indigenous language. Spanish subsequently became used, and Gorgona served as a penal colony, with this penal colony operating from 1960 to 1984 and housing thousands of prisoners from across Colombia. Some prisoners were from Cauca region Indigenous groups, and had their own community known as Huisitó, possibly bringing Indigenous languages onto the island. Before Spanish colonisation, Panama's Coiba Island was inhabited by Indigenous peoples whose language was recorded by early Spanish chroniclers as Ngäbere. The Indigenous population was displaced during the 16th century, and the island remained largely uninhabited until a penal colony was established in 1919; it eventually closed in 2004, and the island is now a nature reserve inhabited by Spanish-speaking park rangers.

On continental Chilean islands, Spanish is now the dominant language, but several island groups have distinctive Indigenous linguistic histories. The Chiloé Archipelago, Chonos Archipelago and Guaitecas Archipelago were historically associated with the Chono people, whose language, known as Chono or Wayteka, is very poorly documented and whose precise genetic classification remains uncertain. A small number of Chono place names survive in the southern Chiloé and Guaitecas region. The Tierra del Fuego archipelago is split between Argentina on its Atlantic side and Chile on its Pacific side, and the main island Isla Grande de Tierra del Fuego was home to the Selk'nam and Haush languages, with other languages like Kawésqar and Yaghan also being spoken on the archipelago.

==== Mainland Americas ====
Canada and the United States are primarily English-speaking, with French a second official language in Canada. Canada has dozens of Indigenous languages, including Cree, Inuktitut, Ojibwe, Dene, Innu, Mi'kmaq, Blackfoot, Mohawk and Nisga'a. The United States has more than 70 Indigenous languages, including Apache, Arapaho, Blackfoot, Cherokee, Cheyenne, Choctaw, Crow, Dakota, Hopi, Keres, Lakota, Navajo, Ojibwe, Shoshoni and Zuni.

In Pacific-facing Latin America, Spanish predominates in Chile, Colombia, Costa Rica, Ecuador, El Salvador, Guatemala, Honduras, Mexico, Nicaragua, Panama and Peru. Indigenous languages from these countries include Aymara, Kichwa, Mapudungun, Mayan languages, Nahuatl, Nasa Yuwe, Quechua, Shuar, and Wayuu.

=== Human settlement of the Indo-Pacific (maximalist geopolitical definition) ===
Human settlement across the Indo-Pacific and its Pacific and Indian Ocean margins occurred in several major phases. The earliest archaeological record in the region extends into the Pleistocene, when early hominins occupied parts of eastern and southern Africa, with populations of Homo sapiens eventually spreading across Arabia, South Asia, Southeast Asia, Australia/New Guinea and the Americas. Much later, Austronesian-speaking peoples developed long-distance maritime networks that produced the Lapita expansion into the Pacific, followed by Polynesian settlement of some of the most isolated islands on earth. A final phase occurred from the 16th century onward, when European, Asian and American powers colonised or established military and scientific outposts on islands that had been discovered unoccupied, such as Mauritius.

==== Human settlement before 16th century ====
The oldest evidence of human or hominin activity in the areas concerned comes from Tanzania, where Olduvai Gorge preserves archaeological and fossil evidence dating to around 1.8 million years ago. These remains belong to early hominins rather than modern Homo sapiens, but nevertheless demonstrate that the East African part of the Indo-Pacific region was occupied by human ancestors extremely early. Much later, anatomically modern humans were established in southern and northeastern Africa. At South Africa, the Klasies River Caves site contained repeated occupation by early modern humans from approximately 120,000 years ago, while the Abdur coast of Eritrea preserves Middle Stone Age artefacts associated with coastal exploitation around 125,000 years ago. Pleistocene archaeological sequences also occur across Egypt, Sudan, Kenya, Somalia, Somaliland, Djibouti and Mozambique, linking these territories to the wider dispersal and development of African hunter-gatherer populations.

In the Arabian Peninsula and adjacent Middle East, occupation also extends deep into the Pleistocene. At Jebel Faya in the United Arab Emirates, archaeological deposits record several episodes of human occupation between about 210,000 and 120,000 years ago, demonstrating repeated use of southeastern Arabia during periods of climatic change. Iran has a Middle Palaeolithic record extending back at least 100,000 years, particularly in the Zagros Mountains, while Iraq, Israel and Jordan form part of the broader Levantine and Mesopotamian zone of early human dispersal. The Arabian Gulf states, including Oman, Saudi Arabia, Qatar, Kuwait and Bahrain, were occupied repeatedly during the Pleistocene and early Holocene as changing rainfall and sea levels altered the availability of freshwater and coastal resources. At Bahrain, a more substantial settled society emerged during the third millennium BCE, associated with the Early Dilmun period at sites such as Qal'at al-Bahrain. Yemen likewise contains archaeological evidence of prehistoric populations predating the literate societies of southern Arabia.

In South Asia, the archaeological sequence becomes especially important after about 80,000 years ago. At Dhaba in central India, stone-tool assemblages indicate long-term human occupation from approximately 80,000 years ago, including occupation spanning the Toba eruption of about 74,000 years ago. Sri Lanka has a particularly well-preserved tropical rainforest record, with modern human occupation at Fa-Hien Lena by roughly 45,000 years ago, including sophisticated hunting of arboreal and semi-arboreal animals and the use of microlithic and bone technologies. Pakistan contains Palaeolithic occupation in the Soan Valley and elsewhere, although some of the oldest proposed dates remain debated.

Eastward, populations spread across continental and island Asia. China has very early evidence for modern humans, with the Fuyan Cave teeth in southern China originally dated to at least 80,000 years ago, although the precise chronology has subsequently been debated. The wider territories of Hong Kong and Macau form part of the much older prehistoric settlement zone of southern China. Russia also contains very early Upper Palaeolithic populations; the approximately 45,000-year-old Ust'-Ishim man from Siberia provides direct evidence of modern humans in the region by that time. The Korean Peninsula, encompassing present-day North Korea and South Korea, preserves Palaeolithic occupation reaching into the Late Pleistocene, with possible anatomically modern human remains around 40,000 years ago. Japan was colonised by modern humans at approximately 38,000 years ago, with the earliest securely dated Upper Palaeolithic sites now concentrated in Kyushu and other parts of the archipelago.

Island Southeast Asia was occupied during the same broad period, requiring increasingly sophisticated maritime movement. In the Philippines, remains from Callao Cave on Luzon, dated to at least 67,000 years ago, belong to the extinct hominin species Homo luzonensis and constitute the earliest direct evidence of human presence in the archipelago. Indonesia was repeatedly occupied during the Late Pleistocene; the Sulawesi cave-art sequence includes a narrative scene at Leang Karampuang dated to at least 51,200 years ago, demonstrating the antiquity of modern human occupation in the Indonesian archipelago. Malaysia contains a long prehistoric record at the Niah Caves of Borneo, where human interaction with the rainforest extends back at least 50,000 years. This wider island zone also encompasses the prehistoric development of Brunei, Singapore, Thailand, Cambodia, Vietnam and Myanmar, with later Neolithic migrations bringing agriculture, pottery and new languages into different parts of mainland and island Southeast Asia.

The settlement of Australia and New Guinea was one of the great early maritime dispersals of Homo sapiens. Archaeological evidence from Madjedbebe in northern Australia indicates occupation by about 65,000 years ago, although the precise chronology of the earliest Australian settlement remains the subject of continuing research. New Guinea was also populated during the Pleistocene, and the ancient landmass of Sahul meant that Australia and New Guinea were connected during periods of lower sea level. Papua New Guinea, including the region of Bougainville and West Papua, therefore possesses a human history many tens of thousands of years older than the later Austronesian settlement of the Pacific. At Kuk in the New Guinea Highlands, people were modifying wetlands at least 7,000 years ago, with evidence for agricultural practices extending possibly to around 10,000 years ago.

The first settlement of the Americas occurred substantially later than the initial dispersal across Asia and Australia/New Guinea. Current archaeological and genetic evidence places the expansion of the ancestors of Indigenous American populations after roughly 16,000 years ago, with securely dated archaeological sites appearing by about 15,000 years ago, although evidence for earlier occupation remains an active field of research. The first populations subsequently spread through Canada, the United States and Mexico, and southward through Central America, including Guatemala, Honduras, El Salvador, Nicaragua, Costa Rica and Panama, before expanding throughout the Andes and South America. By the early Holocene, people were established in Colombia, Ecuador, Peru and Chile. The early chronology of individual sites remains debated; for example, the dating and interpretation of Monte Verde in Chile has been repeatedly reassessed, illustrating the broader uncertainty surrounding some claims for very early settlement in the Americas. Alaska's Aleutian Islands were settled roughly 9,000 years ago.

A separate and much later expansion populated many remote Pacific islands. People had already lived in New Guinea, Bougainville and parts of Near Oceania for tens of thousands of years, but around 3,500–3,000 years ago Austronesian-speaking communities associated with the Lapita culture began a rapid maritime expansion eastward. Lapita settlements extended from the Bismarck archipelago to Vanuatu, New Caledonia and Fiji, and then to Tonga and Samoa, representing the first sustained human colonisation of much of Remote Oceania. The earliest settlement of Fiji is dated to approximately 3,050 calibrated years before present, while Tonga was settled from approximately 2,850 calibrated years before present. American Samoa and Samoa preserve approximately 3,000-year-old settlement sites, while Nauru, Palau and the Mariana Islands were likewise populated during the first millennium BCE or early first millennium CE. Recent genetic research on Palau has confirmed more than 2,900 years of population continuity in the archipelago. Archaeological evidence from Micronesia indicates that the western high islands were settled by at least about 4,000 years ago, while the eastern atolls were generally settled during the following two millennia.

The later Polynesian expansion carried people farther east and south into increasingly isolated islands. Niue was settled by about AD 1000, probably by people moving from Samoa, while Tokelau was settled roughly 1,000 years ago. Tuvalu was likewise settled by Polynesian communities, probably originating principally from Samoa and Tonga, during the later first millennium or early second millennium CE. The Cook Islands were settled by Polynesian voyagers by approximately AD 1000, followed by expansion through the eastern Polynesian network. French Polynesia was settled during the late first and early second millennia CE. Pitcairn Island and neighbouring Henderson Island formed part of this eastward Polynesian network and were occupied during approximately the first millennium CE, before their populations declined or disappeared after the breakdown of long-distance exchange with other islands.

The final major prehistoric Pacific migrations reached Hawaii, Easter Island and New Zealand. The most recent archaeological estimates place the initial settlement of Hawaii between AD 1000 and 1200. Easter Island was colonised by Polynesians during the late first or early second millennium CE, and developed a distinctive society characterised by monumental moai and ahu. New Zealand was among the last large habitable landmasses to be settled, with permanent Polynesian settlement securely established by approximately 1250–1300 CE. Norfolk Island was also occupied briefly by Polynesian seafarers, probably during the 14th or 15th century, before being abandoned prior to European settlement.

The Indian Ocean islands followed a different chronology. Madagascar was one of the last major landmasses to acquire a permanent human population. Earlier claims for Middle or early Holocene occupation remain disputed, but archaeological reviews generally place convincing permanent colonisation in the first millennium CE, when Austronesian-speaking settlers from Island Southeast Asia interacted with populations of African origin. Comoros and Mayotte were settled later than the adjacent African mainland, with archaeological sites securely dated to around the 8th century CE, although earlier visits or episodes of occupation have been proposed. The Maldives were also settled in antiquity, while the later history of the islands became closely connected with maritime trade networks linking India, Sri Lanka, Arabia and East Africa.

==== Humans settlement from 16th century onward ====
Several remote Indian Ocean islands remained uninhabited until the colonial period. Mauritius was apparently uninhabited when Europeans first arrived; the Dutch established the first settlement in 1638, followed by more durable French colonisation from 1721. On Réunion, the first small French community was established in 1663, with a permanent settlement established in 1665. The Seychelles received their first permanent French settlement at St Anne in 1770. The Chagos Archipelago, now the British Indian Ocean Territory, remained uninhabited until French plantation development began in 1793, using enslaved labour followed later by indentured workers from Mauritius and Seychelles. The Cocos (Keeling) Islands were first permanently settled in 1826, while Christmas Island acquired its first permanent European-era settlement in 1888, initially using workers from the Cocos (Keeling) Islands and subsequently much larger Chinese, Malay and Sikh migrant workforces for phosphate mining.

European expansion likewise brought permanent populations to several previously uninhabited eastern Pacific islands. The Juan Fernández Islands were repeatedly visited by European mariners before the Spanish established a permanent garrison and settlement in 1750; the islands subsequently served at various times as a prison and colonial outpost. The Galápagos Islands had no known permanent Indigenous population before European exploration. Patrick Watkins became the first known resident of Floreana Island, living there in 1807–1809, while Ecuador established a formal colony in 1832, making Galápagos one of the latest major Pacific island groups to acquire a permanent state-sponsored population. Guadalupe Island has similarly been used mainly by modern sealers, fishermen, scientific expeditions and military personnel rather than by any known ancient Indigenous populations.

The Bonin Islands provide another example of late permanent settlement by humans. Beginning in the 16th century, the islands were visited and claimed by several maritime powers, but were uninhabited until 1830. That year, a mixed group of European-American settlers and Pacific Islanders established a permanent colony on Chichijima (Peel Island). The Volcano Islands, including Iwo Jima, were settled by Japanese colonists only in the late 19th century. Iwo Jima subsequently developed several civilian settlements based on sulphur mining, agriculture and fishing, but its civilian population was evacuated during the Second World War and has never been permanently restored. Australia's Lord Howe Island in the Pacific was first sighted by Europeans in 1788, with permanent settlement following in 1834. Unlike with Australia's Norfolk Island, it has no evidence of prehistoric activity by Polynesians or any other humans before the initial European sighting.

A number of isolated Pacific territories acquired only temporary or short-lived 19th and 20th-century settlements. Clipperton Island was developed for guano extraction and subsequently received a Mexican garrison and civilian colony in the early 20th century; roughly one hundred people were living there by 1914. The settlement collapsed during the Mexican Revolution, as it disrupted basic supplies for Clipperton, which lacks fresh water and has almost no arable land. Many inhabitants died from malnutrition, and a breakdown of social order led to some inhabitants also being murdered; the survivors were eventually rescued in 1917 by USS Yorktown. Wake Island, Baker Island, Howland Island and Jarvis Island never developed permanent populations; attempts by the United States to establish colonists on Baker, Howland and Jarvis in the 1930s were short-lived. Midway Atoll, Johnston Atoll, Kingman Reef and Palmyra Atoll have likewise been used mainly as military, navigational, scientific or conservation outposts rather than as long-established communities. The Coral Sea Islands are predominantly uninhabited apart from small scientific or meteorological installations such as the station on Willis Island.

Several other isolated Pacific islands have remained without civilian settlement throughout their history. Malpelo Island is a barren Colombian island whose surrounding waters are protected as a marine sanctuary; human presence is limited to small-scale official or scientific activity rather than permanent civilian habitation. Salas y Gómez has no human settlements, while the Desventuradas Islands have likewise remained without permanent civilian populations. Cocos Island off Costa Rica has no known indigenous settlement and has instead served intermittently as an anchorage and later as a protected natural area. The Revillagigedo Islands are also effectively uninhabited apart from small Mexican naval bases on Socorro Island and Clarion Island.

At the far southern edge of the Pacific, Macquarie Island was discovered in 1810 and subsequently used by sealers, but never developed into a permanent civilian settlement; an Australian research station was established there in 1948. The French Southern and Antarctic Lands similarly contain seasonal or rotating research and military personnel rather than an Indigenous or permanent civilian population. The neighboring Heard Island and McDonald Islands have never developed human habitation; the islands weren't discovered until the 19th century and remain unoccupied by humans, with only intermittent visits by scientists, government personnel and other authorised visitors.

=== Geology of the Indo-Pacific (maximalist geopolitical definition) ===
The countries and islands bordering the Pacific and Indian oceans sit on several major tectonic plates and regional microplate boundary zones. The Pacific Plate contains Mexico's Baja California Peninsula, parts of Southern California such as Los Angeles and San Diego, American Samoa, the Cook Islands, the Federated States of Micronesia, French Polynesia, half of New Zealand, Kiribati, the Marshall Islands, Nauru, Niue, Pitcairn Islands, Samoa, Tokelau, Tuvalu and Wallis and Futuna; the Australian Plate, conventionally grouped with the Indian Plate within the broader Indo-Australian Plate system, contains Australia, half of New Zealand, New Caledonia, Norfolk Island, the Coral Sea Islands, Christmas Island and the Cocos (Keeling) Islands; the Indian Plate, treated in many modern models as the Indian component of the broader Indo-Australian system, contains India, Bangladesh, Pakistan, Sri Lanka, the Maldives and the British Indian Ocean Territory, with the Indo–Australian system undergoing broad internal deformation and relative motion between its Indian and Australian components; the Eurasian Plate (including the Sunda, Amurian and Yangtze continental blocks) contains Brunei, Cambodia, China, Hong Kong, Macau, Malaysia, North Korea, Singapore, South Korea, Thailand and Vietnam; the North American Plate contains Canada, much of Mexico and the continental United States; the South American Plate contains Chile, Colombia, Ecuador and Peru; the Caribbean Plate (alongside the adjacent Panama Microplate) contains Costa Rica, El Salvador, Honduras, Nicaragua and Panama; and the Philippine Sea Plate, including the Mariana Microplate and related regional structures, contains Guam, the Northern Mariana Islands and Palau.

Aside from Mexico, New Zealand and the United States, several other countries and territories occupy active multi-plate boundary zones. Fiji lies within the complex boundary system between the Pacific and Indo-Australian plates and includes the North Fiji Microplate; Guatemala lies across the North American–Caribbean Plate boundary; Indonesia occupies one of the world's most complex plate-boundary regions, involving the Sunda, Indo-Australian and Philippine Sea plates together with regional microplates including the Banda Sea, Timor, Bird's Head and Maoke plates; Japan lies at the junction of the Eurasian, North American/Okhotsk, Pacific and Philippine Sea plates; Papua New Guinea, including Bougainville, lies within a rapidly evolving mosaic of microplates between the Australian and Pacific plates, including the Woodlark and Solomon Sea plates; the Philippines lies within the boundary zone between the Philippine Sea and Sunda plates; Russia spans the Eurasian, North American, Amurian and Okhotsk plate systems; the Solomon Islands lie within the Pacific–Indo-Australian collision system and involve the Solomon Sea Plate and other regional plates; Taiwan lies on the convergent boundary between the Eurasian and Philippine Sea plates; Tonga lies at the boundary between the Pacific Plate and the Tonga Microplate; Timor-Leste lies within the complex Australian–Sunda/Timor collision zone; Vanuatu lies along the boundary between the Indo-Australian Plate and New Hebrides Microplate; and West Papua lies within the highly complex plate-boundary region involving the Australian, Philippine Sea, Sunda, Banda Sea, Bird's Head, Maoke and Pacific-Caroline systems.

Across East Africa and the western Indian Ocean, the African Plate contains much of Egypt, Sudan and South Africa, while the Somali Plate forms the eastern part of the broader East African plate system. Somalia and Somaliland lie largely on the Somali Plate; Kenya and Tanzania straddle the diffuse African–Somali plate boundary; and Mozambique is crossed by the southern continuation of the East African Rift and associated Rovuma–Somali boundary system. Djibouti and Eritrea lie near the Afar Triple Junction, where the African, Somali and Arabian plates meet; the same rift system extends southward through Kenya, Tanzania and Mozambique. Comoros and Mayotte lie in the diffuse Africa–Somalia boundary region of the western Indian Ocean, while Madagascar occupies a separate continental block that has broadly moved with Africa but remains associated with the diffuse African–Somali plate-boundary system.

In the Middle East, the Arabian Plate contains Bahrain, Kuwait, Oman, Qatar, Saudi Arabia, the United Arab Emirates and Yemen, while Iraq, Iran, Israel and Jordan lie within or along the wider Arabian–Eurasian and Arabian–African collision and transform systems. The Red Sea and Gulf of Aden separate the Arabian Plate from the African and Somali plates, making the Horn of Africa and southwestern Arabian Peninsula part of an active plate-boundary system.

Some Indian Ocean islands and territories occupy additional plate or microplate settings. The Seychelles lie on the Seychelles continental fragment/microplate within the broader African–Somali system; Mauritius and Réunion lie on the Somali Plate along the Réunion hotspot track; and Heard Island and McDonald Islands and the Kerguelen Islands lie on the Antarctic Plate as the main exposed peaks of the mostly submerged Kerguelen Plateau.

Among non-autonomous Pacific islands, Baker Island, Clipperton Island, Guadalupe Island, Hawaii, Howland Island, Jarvis Island, Johnston Atoll, Kingman Reef, Midway Atoll, Palmyra Atoll, the Revillagigedo Islands and Wake Island sit on the Pacific Plate; Cocos Island sits on the Cocos Plate as its sole emerged island; Malpelo Island sits on the Malpelo Plate, which was formerly classified as part of the Nazca Plate; the Desventuradas Islands, Easter Island, the Galápagos Islands, the Juan Fernández Islands and Salas y Gómez sit on the Nazca Plate, adjacent to the Easter and Galápagos microplates; the Aleutian Islands form the arc boundary where the North American Plate overrides the subducting Pacific Plate; the Kuril Islands sit on the Okhotsk Plate (a microplate historically linked to the North American Plate); the Bonin and Volcano Islands sit on the Philippine Sea Plate; the Ryukyu Islands lie on the Okinawa Plate, which forms part of the overriding Eurasian Plate margin; and Australia's Macquarie Island lies on the active boundary between the Indo-Australian and Pacific plates.

=== GDP of Indo-Pacific countries (maximalist geopolitical definition) ===
Rank	Country / Territory	GDP in 2024 (Nominal, USD)
1	United States	$30.77 trillion
2	China	$19.50 trillion
3	Japan	$4.44 trillion
4	India	$3.96 trillion
5	Russia	$2.56 trillion
6	Canada	$2.32 trillion
7	South Korea	$1.87 trillion
8	Mexico	$1.83 trillion
9	Australia	$1.80 trillion
10	Indonesia	$1.45 trillion
11	Saudi Arabia	$1.28 trillion
12	Taiwan	$801.05 billion
13	Israel	$610.78 billion
14	Singapore	$603.87 billion
15	Thailand	$577.01 billion
16	United Arab Emirates	$552.33 billion
17	Vietnam	$514.70 billion
18	Philippines	$487.09 billion
19	Malaysia	$472.19 billion
20	Colombia	$457.41 billion
21	Bangladesh	$456.32 billion
22	Hong Kong	$427.31 billion
23	South Africa	$427.18 billion
24	Pakistan	$407.31 billion
25	Egypt	$365.26 billion
26	Iran	$362.68 billion
27	Chile	$357.37 billion
28	Peru	$334.86 billion
29	New Zealand	$264.06 billion
30	Iraq	$254.37 billion
31	Qatar	$215.56 billion
32	Kuwait	$157.21 billion
33	Kenya	$135.94 billion
34	Ecuador	$130.32 billion
35	Guatemala	$123.31 billion
36	Oman	$109.61 billion
37	Sri Lanka	$108.83 billion
38	Costa Rica	$102.91 billion
39	Panama	$90.46 billion
40	Tanzania	$90.14 billion
41	Myanmar	$81.67 billion
42	Jordan	$61.61 billion
43	Sudan	$60.16 billion
44	Macau	$52.06 billion
45	Cambodia	$51.27 billion
46	Bahrain	$48.97 billion
47	Honduras	$39.60 billion
48	El Salvador	$36.71 billion
49	Papua New Guinea	$32.50 billion
50	Mozambique	$22.34 billion
51	Nicaragua	$22.24 billion
52	Madagascar	$19.62 billion
53	North Korea	$16.45 billion
54	Mauritius	$16.16 billion
55	Brunei	$15.03 billion
56	Somalia	$13.00 billion
57	New Caledonia	$8.55 billion
58	Yemen	$8.06 billion
59	Maldives	$7.74 billion
60	French Polynesia	$6.32 billion
61	Fiji	$6.20 billion
62	Djibouti	$4.63 billion
63	Seychelles	$2.39 billion
64	Eritrea	$2.28 billion
65	Timor-Leste	$1.90 billion
66	Comoros	$1.82 billion
67	Solomon Islands	$1.75 billion
68	Vanuatu	$1.35 billion
69	Samoa	$1.29 billion
70	Tonga	$679 million
71	Federated States of Micronesia	$502 million
72	Cook Islands	$366 million
73	Kiribati	$349 million
74	Palau	$345 million
75	Marshall Islands	$308 million
76	Nauru	$176 million
77	Tuvalu	$57 million

=== Life expectancy of Indo-Pacific countries (maximalist geopolitical definition) ===
Life expectancy by country (2025)
Rank	Country / Territory	Combined life expectancy	Life expectancy, males	Life expectancy, females
1	Hong Kong	85.5 years	82.7 years	88.2 years
2	Kuwait	84.6 years	83.8 years	85.4 years
3	French Polynesia	84.3 years	81.9 years	86.6 years
4	Japan	84.1 years	81.1 years	87.1 years
5	South Korea	83.7 years	80.8 years	86.6 years
6	Singapore	83.4 years	81.2 years	85.6 years
7	Macau	83.4 years	80.6 years	86.2 years
8	United Arab Emirates	83.3 years	82.2 years	84.3 years
9	Israel	83.3 years	81.1 years	85.4 years
10	Australia	83.1 years	81.1 years	85.1 years
11	Qatar	82.7 years	81.8 years	83.5 years
12	Canada	82.2 years	80.0 years	84.3 years
13	New Zealand	82.1 years	80.4 years	83.7 years
14	Bahrain	81.5 years	80.9 years	82.1 years
15	Maldives	81.5 years	79.9 years	83.0 years
16	Chile	81.4 years	79.5 years	83.2 years
17	Costa Rica	81.0 years	78.4 years	83.6 years
18	Taiwan	80.8 years	77.7 years	84.0 years
19	Oman	80.4 years	78.7 years	82.0 years
20	Panama	79.8 years	76.9 years	82.7 years
21	Saudi Arabia	79.3 years	77.3 years	81.3 years
22	Northern Mariana Islands	79.1 years	77.3 years	80.9 years
23	United States	79.0 years	76.5 years	81.4 years
24	New Caledonia	79.0 years	76.5 years	81.4 years
25	Wallis and Futuna	78.9 years	77.9 years	79.9 years
26	Jordan	78.1 years	75.9 years	80.3 years
27	China	78.1 years	75.2 years	81.0 years
28	Peru	78.0 years	75.6 years	80.3 years
29	Iran	77.9 years	76.0 years	79.8 years
30	Colombia	77.9 years	75.2 years	80.6 years
31	Guam	77.7 years	73.7 years	81.6 years
32	Ecuador	77.6 years	74.9 years	80.3 years
33	Sri Lanka	77.6 years	74.4 years	80.7 years
34	Tokelau	77.3 years	75.2 years	79.2 years
35	Malaysia	77.0 years	74.4 years	79.5 years
36	Thailand	76.7 years	72.3 years	81.0 years
37	Seychelles	76.4 years	72.1 years	80.7 years
38	Cook Islands	75.7 years	72.4 years	79.5 years
39	Brunei	75.6 years	73.5 years	77.7 years
40	Mexico	75.2 years	72.4 years	78.0 years
41	Nicaragua	75.1 years	72.5 years	77.6 years
42	Bangladesh	75.0 years	73.3 years	76.7 years
43	Vietnam	74.8 years	70.1 years	79.4 years
44	Mauritius	73.9 years	70.4 years	77.4 years
45	North Korea	73.8 years	71.6 years	75.9 years
46	Russia	73.6 years	68.3 years	78.9 years
47	American Samoa	73.2 years	70.3 years	76.0 years
48	Honduras	73.1 years	70.5 years	75.7 years
49	Tonga	73.0 years	69.5 years	76.5 years
50	Guatemala	72.7 years	70.4 years	75.0 years
51	Iraq	72.4 years	70.5 years	74.2 years
52	India	72.3 years	70.7 years	73.9 years
53	El Salvador	72.2 years	67.8 years	76.5 years
54	Samoa	71.9 years	70.0 years	73.8 years
55	Egypt	71.9 years	69.7 years	74.0 years
56	Vanuatu	71.9 years	69.6 years	74.1 years
57	Indonesia	71.3 years	69.2 years	73.4 years
58	Solomon Islands	70.8 years	69.4 years	72.2 years
59	Cambodia	70.8 years	68.1 years	73.4 years
60	Niue	70.2 years	67.6 years	73.0 years
61	Philippines	70.0 years	67.0 years	73.0 years
62	Palau	69.6 years	67.3 years	71.9 years
63	Yemen	69.5 years	67.4 years	71.5 years
64	Eritrea	68.9 years	66.8 years	70.9 years
65	Timor-Leste	68.0 years	66.3 years	69.7 years
66	Pakistan	67.9 years	65.5 years	70.3 years
67	Fiji	67.5 years	65.5 years	69.5 years
68	Federated States of Micronesia	67.5 years	63.6 years	71.3 years
69	Tuvalu	67.4 years	63.9 years	70.9 years
70	Marshall Islands	67.3 years	65.0 years	69.5 years
71	Tanzania	67.2 years	64.4 years	70.0 years
72	Myanmar	67.2 years	64.0 years	70.4 years
73	Comoros	67.1 years	65.0 years	69.2 years
74	Sudan	66.6 years	63.4 years	69.8 years
75	Kiribati	66.5 years	64.7 years	68.3 years
76	Papua New Guinea	66.5 years	63.8 years	69.2 years
77	South Africa	66.3 years	62.8 years	69.8 years
78	Djibouti	66.2 years	63.7 years	68.7 years
79	Madagascar	64.5 years	62.9 years	66.2 years
80	Kenya	62.6 years	60.1 years	65.2 years
81	Nauru	62.3 years	60.4 years	64.2 years
82	Mozambique	59.3 years	56.4 years	62.2 years
83	Somalia	55.3 years	53.2 years	57.4 years

== See also ==
- AUKUS
- Asia-Pacific Economic Cooperation
- Austronesian peoples
- Bangladesh and the Indo-Pacific Strategy
- China Rim
- Comprehensive and Progressive Agreement for Trans-Pacific Partnership
- East of Suez
- Global Southeast
- Indo-Pacific Maritime Surveillance Collaboration
- Indian Ocean Rim Association
- Indo-Mediterranean
- Inner Asia, the landlocked parts of Asia
- Indo-Pacific Century
- Orient
- Pacific Rim
- Quad Critical Minerals Initiative Framework
- Strait of Malacca
- Valeriepieris circle
- United States Indo-Pacific Command
