= Matthias Basedau =

German political scientist

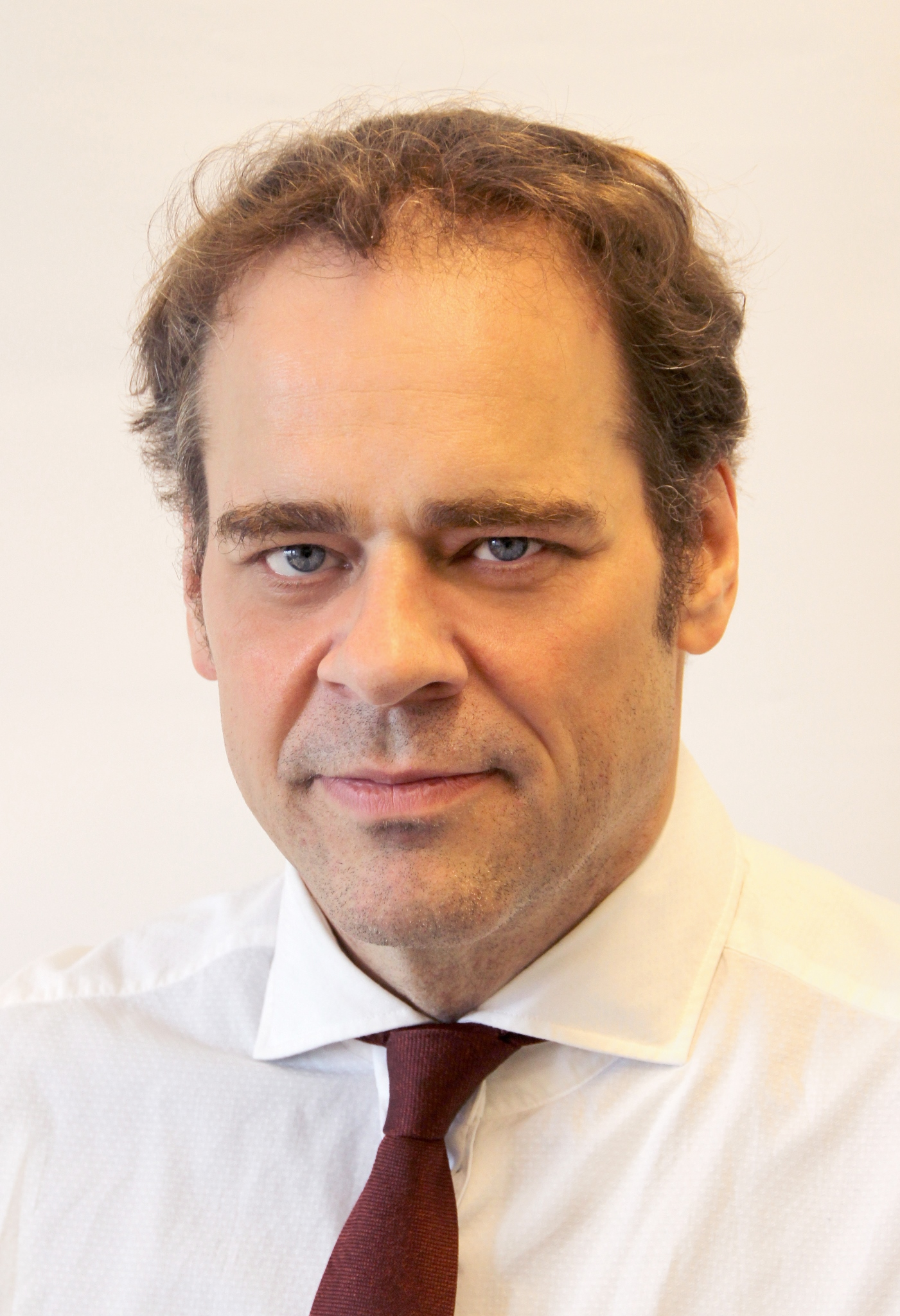
- Basedau in 2015
- Born: February 8, 1968 (age 58); Heilbronn, Germany

Academic background
- Education: Heidelberg University

Academic work
- Discipline: Political science; Sociology
- Institutions: German Institute for Global and Area Studies; University of Hamburg
- Website: website of Matthias Basedau

Matthias Basedau (born February 8, 1968, in Heilbronn) is a German political scientist and director of the GIGA Institute for African Studies in Hamburg.

== Biography ==
=== Professional career ===
Basedau studied political science, sociology and psychology at the University of Heidelberg. After the Doctorate in Heidelberg (2001, Dr. phil.) he worked as research fellow at the GIGA Institute for African Studies in 2002. There he was responsible for southern Africa (especially Botswana), West Africa and the Sahel (especially Mali, Niger, Chad). Since 2013 he has been teaching as a professor at the University of Hamburg (§ 17 Professorship). In 2014 he was visiting professor at the Peace Research Institute Oslo. Since 2018 he has been the director of the GIGA Institute for African Studies in Hamburg.

=== Research focus ===
Matthias Basedau's main research interests are in the field of Peace and conflict studies (security). These include domestic violent conflicts and conflict resolution, particularly determinants such as ethnicity, strategic natural resources, political institutions and religion as well as natural disasters and population growth. In doing so, he is guided by comparative political science, for example, research on political parties, party systems and democratization; institutional engineering, regime change in Sub-Saharan Africa. Methodologically, he uses a combination of qualitative and quantitative research methods, qualitative Small-N comparisons, Comparative Area Studies. His regional expertise is focused on Sub-Saharan Africa and the Global South, in particular West Africa, Sahel and Botswana.

=== Selected academic positions ===
- Member of the External Advisory Committee of the Centro de Estudios Internacionales (CEI-ISCTE), Lisbon (since September 2022)
- Member of the Scientific Advisory Board of the Peace Research Institute Frankfurt (since November 2021).
- Member of the national working group “Religion and Development” in the BMZ (National Theme Team ‘Religion and Development’) (since May 2015)
- Member of the advisory board of the HIIK Conflict Barometer (2016–2019)
- External collaborator at the Peace Research Institute Oslo (PRIO) (since May 2014).

== Selected research projects ==
- "Freedom and Development? Religious Actors, Freedom of Religion and Belief and Sustainable Development, Federal Ministry for Economic Cooperation and Development (BMZ), Bonn (2020–2023).
- "Religion, Conflict and Sustainable Peace", (BMZ), Bonn (February–December 2019)
- "Working group member in the project "Resolving Jihadist Conflicts? Religion, Civil War and Prospects for Peace” at Uppsala University, directed by Isak Svensson and funded by the Riksbankens Jubileumsfond (since 2016)
- Co-director: "Religious Minorities: Discrimination, Grievances and Conflict", German Israeli Foundation (GIF) (2016–2019)
- "A dangerous liaison. Ethnicity, Natural Resources and Civil Conflict Onset“, German Research Foundation (DFG) (2012–2017)
- Co-director: “Institutions for Sustainable Peace – Comparing Institutional Configurations in Divided Societies”, Leibniz Scientific Community (WGL), Pact for Research and Innovation (2012–2017).

== Selected publications ==
- with Jan Lay:”Resource Curse or Rentier Peace? The Ambiguous Effects of Oil Wealth and Oil Dependence on Violent Conflict”. Journal of Peace Research, vol. 46(6), 757–776 (2009)
- with B. Pfeiffer & J. Vüllers: „Bad Religion? Religion, Collective Action, and the Onset of Armed Conflict in Developing Countries”. Journal of Conflict Resolution, vol. 60(2), 226–255 (2016).
- with M. Köllner: “Area studies, comparative area studies, and the study of politics: Context, substance, and methodological challenges”. Z Vgl Polit Wiss, vol. 1, 105–124 (2007).
- with Havard Hegre et al.: '”ViEWS: A political violence early-warning system”. Journal of Peace Research, vol. 56(2) 155–174 (2019)
- with Mora Deitch & Ariel Zellman: “Rebels with a Cause: Does Ideology Make Armed Conflicts Longer and Bloodier?”, Journal of Conflict Resolution, vol. 66 (10) 1826–1853 (2022)
- Erfolgsbedingungen von Demokratie im subsaharischen Afrika. Ein systematischer Vergleich ausgewählter Länder. Opladen 2003, ISBN 3-8100-3820-2.
- as co-editor with de:Andreas Mehler: Resource politics in sub-Saharan Africa. Hamburg 2005, ISBN 3-928049-91-7.
- as co-editor with Hanspeter Mattes and Anika Oettler: Multiple Unsicherheit. Befunde aus Asien, Nahost, Afrika und Lateinamerika. Hamburg 2005, ISBN 3-926953-66-7. (Schriften des Deutschen Übersee-Instituts Hamburg; Nr. 66)
- as co-editor with de:Robert Kappel: Machtquelle Erdöl. Die Außen-, Innen- und Wirtschaftspolitik von Erdölstaaten. Nomos, Baden-Baden 2011, ISBN 3-8329-6892-X.
