= Journal of Current Chinese Affairs =

German academic journal

Journal of Current Chinese Affairs is a German open access academic journal (ISSN 0341-6631), published by Sage Journals. The internationally refereed journal focuses on political, economic and social developments in the People's Republic of China, Hong Kong, Macau, and Taiwan. This journal is a member of the Committee on Publication Ethics (COPE). The journal is indexed on SCOPUS and has a cite score of 2.2 in 2023.

== Editor ==
The Journal of Current Chinese Affairs, first published in 1972 as China aktuell, is edited by the GIGA Institute for Asian Studies (GIGA Institut für Asien-Studien). The journal, published three times a year, is part of the GIGA Journal Family of the German Institute for Global and Area Studies' (Hamburg). The journal's editorial board is led by Kerry Brown and Sinan Chu.

The GIGA Journal Family was funded by the German Research Foundation (Deutsche Forschungsgemeinschaft, DFG) as a pilot project in open-access publishing. Since the beginning of 2009, the Journal of Current Chinese Affairs, and the other socio-scientific journals of the German Institute for Global and Area Studies, have been transformed into open-access journals. The institute also continues to publish print versions of all journals of current Chinese affairs.

== Journal concept ==
The Journal of Current Chinese Affairs analyses current issues in political, social and economic life; culture; and development in contemporary China, including Hong Kong, Macau and Taiwan. In addition, special background analyses examine important events in accordance with their respective contexts. Although the Journal is Open-Access, its author process charge is sponsored by GIGA.

The Journal of Current Chinese Affairs reaches a broad readership in academic, administration, and business circles, but it is also intended for practitioners and general readers interested in contemporary China. The journal is included in the collections of various public and university libraries in Germany as well as overseas. To ensure the journal's quality, essays are evaluated in a double-blind peer-review process.
