= Patrick Köllner =

German political scientist (born 1968)

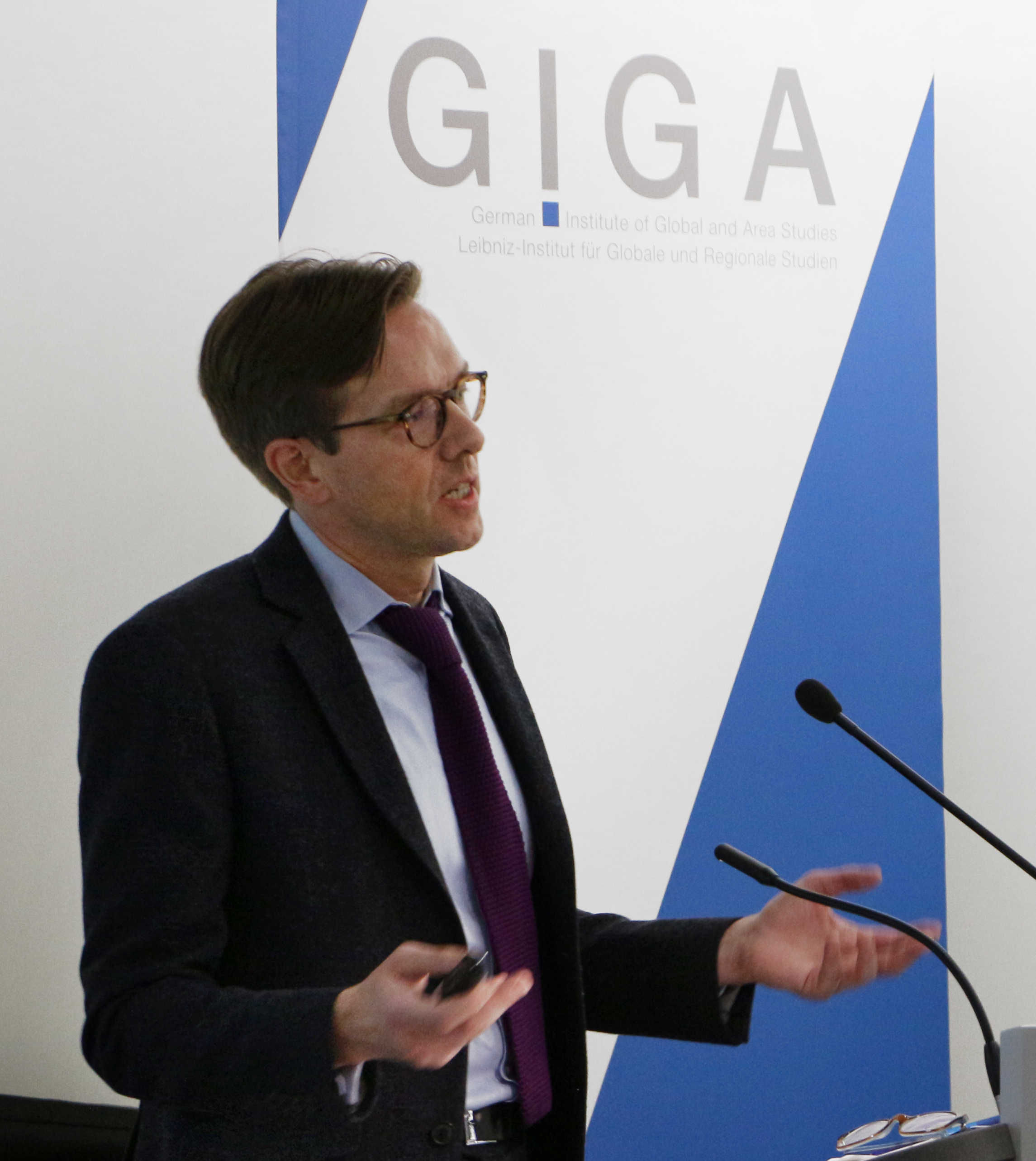
- Prof. Dr. Köllner at the Hamburg night of knowledge in 2017

Personal details
- Born: 10 March 1968 (age 58) Hamburg, West Germany
- Education: Humboldt University of Berlin; University of Trier

Patrick Köllner (born March 10, 1968, in Hamburg) is a German political scientist.

== Education and career ==
Köllner earned his doctorate degree with Michael Kreile at the Humboldt University of Berlin on South Korea's technological dependence on Japan. In 2005, he habilitated at the University of Trier. From 1996 to 2007, he worked as a research associate at the GIGA German Institute of Global and Area Studies, responsible for politics in Japan and politics and economy on the Korean peninsula.

Köllner has been chairman of the Hamburg Foundation Asia Bridge since 2005. From 2007 to 2011, he was acting director of the GIGA Institute for Asian Studies. He has been director since July 2011 and vice president of the GIGA Institute for Asian Studies since 2017.

Köllner is an expert on political developments in Korea. He researches Japanese, Korean and Australian domestic politics, authoritarian regimes in international comparison and has published on parties and elections in Japan, South Korea, Australia and New Zealand.

He is one of the organisers of the Franco-German Observatory of the Indo-Pacific, an observatory "which invites key actors from the Indo-Pacific to present their vision of the region" and host debates about "questions of economic interdependence and independence, of trade and investment, and the expectations the countries of the Indo-Pacific might have towards the “West” in general, and Europe, in particular".

== Selected publications ==
- Croissant, Aurel / Kailitz, Steffen / Koellner, Patrick / Wurster, Stefan (2014): Comparing autocracies in the early Twenty-first Century, Vol 2: The Performance and Persistence of Autocracies, ISBN 9780367739232.
- Frank, Rüdiger / Hoare, James E. / Koellner, Patrick / Pares, Susan (2011): Korea 2011: Politics, Economy and Society, ISBN 978-90-04-21935-9.
- Patman, Robert G. / Köllner, Patrick / Kiglics, Balazs (eds.) (2022), From Asia-Pacific to Indo-Pacific: Diplomacy in a Contested Region, Cham: Palgrave Macmillan, doi:10.1007/978-981-16-7007-7
- Köllner, Patrick (2022), Australia and New Zealand in the Pacific: the difference is migration policy, Devpolicy Blog, 21 June 2022, Australian National University, https://devpolicy.org/australia-and-nz-in-the-pacific-difference-is-migration-policy-20220621/ (open access)
- The Organization of Japanese Parties. The emergence, change and effects of formal and informal institutions (= communications from the Institute for Asian Studies. Vol. 390). IFA, Hamburg 2006 (German: Die Organisation japanischer Parteien. Entstehung, Wandel und Auswirkungen formaler und informeller Institutionen (= Mitteilungen des Instituts für Asienkunde. Bd. 390). IFA, Hamburg 2006), ISBN 3-88910-320-0.
- South Korea's technological dependence on Japan. Origin, course and counter-strategies (= communications from the Institute for Asian Studies, Hamburg. Vol. 293). Institute for Asian Studies, Hamburg 1998 (German: Südkoreas technologische Abhängigkeit von Japan. Entstehung, Verlauf und Gegenstrategien (= Mitteilungen des Instituts für Asienkunde, Hamburg. Bd. 293). Institut für Asienkunde, Hamburg 1998), ISBN 3-88910-201-8.

=== Peer reviews ===
- Becker, M. (2013). Autokratien im Vergleich, PVS-Sonderheft 47 Steffen KAILITZ Patrick KÖLLNER. In Zeitschrift für Politik (Bd. 60, Nummer 4, S. 479).
- Rezension: Steffen Kailitz, Patrick Köllner (Hrsg.), Autokratien im Vergleich, Baden-Baden 2013. (2018). In POLITIKUM (Nummer 1, S. 88–89).
- Leuteritz, K. (2004). [Review of Korea 2004, by P. Köllner]. Verfassung Und Recht in Übersee / Law and Politics in Africa, Asia and Latin America, 37(4), 503–505. http://www.jstor.org/stable/43239239.
- Adelsberger, K. (2003). [Review of Reformen in Japan (Reforms in Japan), by F. Bosse & P. Koellner]. European Journal of East Asian Studies, 2(1), 185–187. http://www.jstor.org/stable/23615544.
- Leuteritz, K. (2002). [Review of Korea 2001, by P. Köllner]. Verfassung Und Recht in Übersee / Law and Politics in Africa, Asia and Latin America, 35(1), 155–157. http://www.jstor.org/stable/43239897.
