= Journal of Current Southeast Asian Affairs =

Journal of Current Southeast Asian Affairs (ISSN 0722-8821) is a German academic journal. The internationally refereed journal focuses on political, economic and social developments in Brunei, East Timor, Indonesia, Cambodia, Laos, Malaysia, Myanmar, the Philippines, Singapore, Thailand and Vietnam.

== Editor ==
The Journal of Current Southeast Asian Affairs, first published in 1982 as Südostasien aktuell is edited by the GIGA Institute of Asian Studies (GIGA Institut für Asien-Studien). The journal, published three times a year, is part of the GIGA Journal Family of the German Institute for Global and Area Studies in Hamburg. The journal's editorial board is led by Marco Bünte, Andreas Ufen and David Camroux.

The GIGA Journal Family is funded by the German Research Foundation (Deutsche Forschungsgemeinschaft, DFG) as a pilot project in open-access publishing. Since the beginning of 2009 the Journal of Current Southeast Asian Affairs and the other socio-scientific journals of the German Institute for Global and Area Studies have been transformed into open-access journals. The institute also continues to publish print versions of all journals.

== Journal concept ==
The Journal of Current Southeast Asian Affairs provides in-depth analyses of current issues in political, social and economic life; culture; and development in Southeast Asia, as well as information on the regional organization ASEAN and its relations with the great powers of the region. In addition, special background analyses examine important events in accordance with their respective contexts. The Journal of Current Southeast Asian Affairs reaches a broad readership in academic, administration and business circles, but it is also intended for practitioners and general readers interested in Southeast Asia. The journal is included in the collections of various public and university libraries in Germany as well as overseas. To ensure the journal's quality, essays are evaluated in a double-blind peer-review process.
