= Amrita Narlikar =

Political scientist

Amrita Narlikar is an academic specializing in international relations, international negotiations, the political economy of international trade, and the role of rising powers in global politics.

== Career ==
Amrita Narlikar was awarded her MPhil and DPhil from Oxford University (Balliol College), on an Inlaks Scholarship and was appointed to a junior research fellowship at St John's College, Oxford. She also has a master's degree from the School of International Studies, Jawaharlal Nehru University, and a bachelor's degree in history from St. Stephen's College, Delhi.

Narlikar was a junior research fellow at St John's College, Oxford from 1999 to 2003, and continued as a research associate in the Oxford Centre for International Studies until 2014. After a year as a lecturer at the University of Exeter, she became a lecturer, senior lecturer, reader, and full professor at the University of Cambridge from 2004 to 2015, and a fellow of Darwin College, Cambridge from 2008 to 2015.

Next, she worked in Germany from 2014 to 2024 as president of the German Institute for Global and Area Studies (GIGA) and as a professor in International Relations at the University of Hamburg. In 2024 she returned to India as a distinguished fellow of the Observer Research Foundation in Delhi. She continues to hold honorary positions as a fellow of Darwin College and as a distinguished fellow of the Australia-India Institute at the University of Melbourne in Australia.

== Books ==
Narlikar's books include:

- Strategic Choices, Ethical Dilemmas: Stories from the Mahabharat (co-authored), Penguin Random House India, 2023
- India Rising: A Multilayered Analysis of Ideas, Interests, and Institutions (co-edited), Oxford University Press, 2022
- Poverty Narratives and Power Paradoxes in International Trade Negotiations and Beyond, Cambridge University Press, 2020
- Bargaining with a Rising India: Lessons from the Mahabharata (co-authored), Oxford: Oxford University Press, 2014
- The Oxford Handbook on the World Trade Organization (co-edited), Oxford: Oxford University Press, 2012
- Deadlocks in Multilateral Negotiations: Causes and Solutions (edited), Cambridge: Cambridge University Press, 2010
- New Powers: How to Become One and How to Manage Them (2010)
- The World Trade Organization: A Very Short Introduction (2005)
- International Trade and Developing Countries: Bargaining Coalitions in the GATT & WTO (2004)

== Personal life ==
Narlikar is the daughter of author Aruna Narlikar and physicist Anant V. Narlikar, and the granddaughter of physicist Vishnu Vasudev Narlikar.
