= Hamburg Foundation Asia Bridge =

Non-profit German Charitable Foundation

- Founded: 2005
- Founder: Hamburg Senate, Hamburg Parliament
- Type: Foundation under civil law
- Purpose: Development assistance and humanitarian aid in Asia
- Location: Hamburg, Germany
- Region served: International
- Key people: Patrick Köllner (President); Almut Rößner (Chair); Petra Helf (Chair)
- Website: www.stiftung-asienbruecke.de

The Hamburg Foundation Asia Bridge (HSAB) is a foundation set up by the Hamburg Senate and the Hamburg Parliament to promote development cooperation in Asia while working with businesses and institutions in Hamburg. It was founded in 2005 and is a charitable foundation under civil law with legal capacity. Hamburg's Senate and Parliament subsidize the foundation annually.

== Organization ==
=== Goals ===
- Improvement of living conditions and education of citizens in Asia
- Training of professionals and managers
- Exchange of knowledge and experience
- Promotion of environmental protection
- Increased awareness of issues regarding development cooperation in Hamburg
- Promotion of dialogue between associations and institutions in Asia and in Hamburg

=== Structure ===
According to the foundation's statutes, the Hamburg Foundation Asia Bridge does not promote the economic interests of domestic companies. However, projects do not lose their eligibility for funding if the implementation also brings the initiator an economic advantage in addition to fulfilling the foundation's purpose.

== Projects in 2022 ==
=== Afghanistan ===
The aim of the project is to improve the learning conditions of pupils at the Khoja Mohammad Parsa primary school in Kabul. Since the start of the project in 2020, the construction of a new school building for the 600 pupils and the 22 teachers has been supported in cooperation with Visions for Children e.V.

=== Sri Lanka ===
Since 2020, the foundation has been supporting a project for the further training of women from poor backgrounds in Sri Lanka. The aim of the project is the training and further education of the participating women in the areas of vegetable cultivation, mushroom cultivation as well as the teaching of manual skills and basic business knowledge to build up their own businesses. In response to restrictions resulting from the COVID-19 pandemic, the HSAB, together with the Sri Lanka Verein Hamburg e.V. and the Creative Women's Foundation from Sri Lanka, expanded the skills taught to include the manufacturing of face masks.
