= Africa Spectrum =

- Cover of Africa Spectrum, volume 57, issue 3, 2022
- Discipline: African studies
- Language: English
- Edited by: Maxine Rubin and Martha C. Johnson (2024)

Publication details
- History: 1966–present
- Publisher: GIGA (German Institute of Global and Area Studies, Institute of African Affairs), Sage Publications, Ltd. (Germany)
- Frequency: Triannual
- License: CC BY-ND
- Impact factor: 1.9 (Area Studies, Web of Science). Scopus Citescore 2016: 0.45) (2014)

Standard abbreviations
- ISO 4: Afr. Spectr.

Indexing
- ISSN: 0002-0397 (print); 1868-6869 (web)
- LCCN: 2009235670
- OCLC no.: 900986032

Links
- Journal homepage

Africa Spectrum (also formerly known as Afrika Spectrum) is an interdisciplinary double-blind peer-reviewed academic journal concentrating on current political, sociological, historical, and development matters in Africa. It was founded in 1966 and was the only German academic journal exclusively devoted to Africa. Today, Africa Spectrum is published in English and is Platinum Open Access. Africa Spectrum is published three times a year by the GIGA Institute of African Affairs. The journal is part of the GIGA Journal Family of the GIGA-Institute of African Affairs (Deutsches Institut für Afrika-Forschung/Institute of African Studies (Hamburg) within the German Institute for Global and Area Studies in (Hamburg, Germany). Issues starting from the year 1966 are available at JSTOR, with a three-year moving wall.

== Concept ==
Africa Spectrum publishes scientific knowledge on politics, societies, and development in Africa, as well as Africa's role in the international system. Africa Spectrum is double-blind peer reviewed and, as of 2024, tied as the highest ranked African studies journal. Its intended audiences are academics, students, general readers, and practitioners with a concern for contemporary Africa. Since 2003, the journal collaborates closely with the Association of Africanists in Germany (Vereinigung für Afrikawissenschaften in Deutschland, VAD).

== Indexing ==
The journal is indexed by the Social Sciences Citation Index, African Studies Abstracts Online, Cambridge Scientific Abstracts, Scopus, and the International Bibliography of the Social Sciences.
