= German Institute for Global and Area Studies =

Research institute in Hamburg, Germany

- Founded: 1964 (as German Overseas Institute)
- Type: Foundation under civil law
- Purpose: Politics, economics, and society in Africa, Asia, Latin America and the Middle East; global connections
- Location: Hamburg, Germany
- Region served: International
- Method: Area and comparative area studies
- Key people: Sabine Kurtenbach (president (ad interim) since 2024)
- Website: giga-hamburg.de

The German Institute for Global and Area Studies (German: Leibniz-Institut für Globale und Regionale Studien), also known as GIGA, is a German research institute. It analyses political, economic, and social developments in Africa, Asia, Latin America, as well as the Middle East. It combines its analysis with comparative research on international relations, development and globalisation, violence and security, and political systems. The institute is based in Hamburg and has an office in Berlin.

The GIGA is a member of the Leibniz Association.

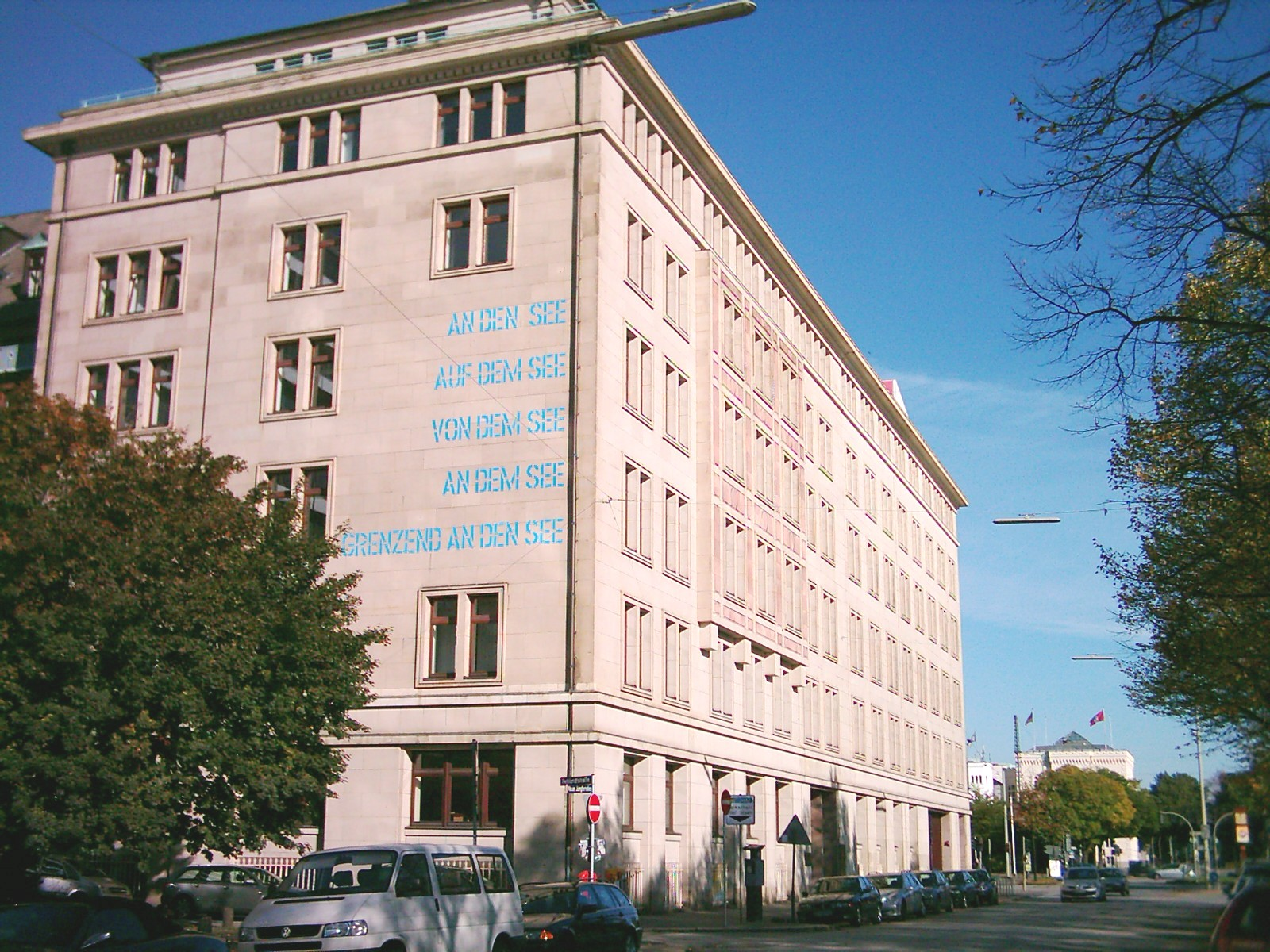
The GIGA in Hamburg

== Research ==
The GIGA is an international research institute committed to a global approach to scholarship and conducts research in the fields of comparative area studies, and on global developments. The researchers study the four global regions of Africa, Asia, Latin America, and the Middle East and simultaneously work within the four research programmes on the following issues: Accountability and Participation, Peace and Security, Globalisation and Development, Global Orders and Foreign Policies. The institute employs approximately 160 people, over 90 of whom are highly qualified scholars (including Junior Research Fellows who are beginning their careers in either the Doctoral programme or in research projects.)

== Organisation ==
The institute was founded in 1964 by the City of Hamburg and the Hamburg business community as the German Overseas Institute (Deutsche Übersee Institute), or DÜI, an umbrella organisation for the Institute of Asian Affairs, the German Orient Institute, the Institute of Latin American Affairs, and the Institute of African Affairs. As a consequence of an evaluation of the DÜI in 2004, the institute renamed itself GIGA German Institute of Global and Area Studies in 2006; in May 2020 the name was changed to German Institute for Global and Area Studies. GIGA is no longer part of the name, but is still used as an acronym.

In 2007, the Institute underwent a transformation that saw the previously relatively autonomous regional institutes unite as the German Institute for Global and Area Studies (Leibniz-Institut für Globale und Regionale Studien). Only the German Orient Institute did not take part in the fusion. However, the GIGA had already hired many of its employees.

The GIGA collaborates with numerous universities, research institutes, and expert associations around the world. It is represented on the boards of various academic networks, particularly those related to Africa, Asia, Latin America, and the Middle East.

The GIGA is a foundation under civil law and is based in Hamburg. It is jointly funded by the Federal Foreign Office, the Hamburg Ministry of Science and Research, and the other federal states. The GIGA also receives external funding, which accounts for around 25 percent of the total budget.

Since 2024, Sabine Kurtenbach has been the president (ad interim) of the GIGA. Together with the president, the GIGA executive board comprises Asia researcher Patrick Köllner (GIGA vice president), Middle East academic Eckart Woertz, Africa academic Matthias Basedau, Latin-America researcher Merike Blofield, and Managing Director Peter Peetz.

== International Networks ==
The GIGA serves as the central coordinator of various academic networks.

The Institutions for Sustainable Peace (ISP) network undertakes research on measures to promote peace in post-war societies with partners from Sweden, Norway, Switzerland, England, and Germany.

The Land Matrix project is an online platform that collects global data on large-scale land acquisitions. The GIGA maintains the platform and evaluates the data.

Academics in the Regional Powers Network (RPN) are studying the global rise of new regional powers. This is a joint project of the GIGA, the University of Oxford, and Sciences Po, Paris.

As of July 2014, the GIGA is coordinating the International Diffusion and Cooperation of Authoritarian Regimes (IDCAR) network. Along with twelve international research institutes, the GIGA is investigating the influence of and cooperation between authoritarian regimes on the international stage.

== Publications ==
The GIGA publishes three open-access series: the GIGA Focus, the GIGA Working Papers, and the GIGA Journal Family.

- In the GIGA Focus series, academics publish short analyses of current global events. The German editions comprise four different regional series (Africa, Asia, Latin America, and the Middle East), as well as the GIGA Focus Global, which covers comparative and global topics. Each edition is published approximately six times per year.
- The GIGA Working Papers publish the results of research projects currently underway.
- Through the GIGA Journal Family, the GIGA publishes articles by academics from around the world. The following journals are part of the journal family:
  - Africa Spectrum
  - Journal of Current Chinese Affairs (JCCA)
  - Journal of Politics in Latin America (JPLA)
  - Journal of Current Southeast Asian Affairs (JCSAA)

== Notable staff ==
- Matthias Basedau, Institute for African Studies
- Patrick Köllner, Institute for Asian Studies
- Rolf Hofmeier, Institute for African Affairs
- Amrita Narlikar, President of the GIGA (2014-2024)
