= Timeline of Brisbane =

The following is a timeline of the history of the city of Brisbane, Queensland, Australia.

== 18th century ==
- 1770 Captain James Cook sails up Queensland coast with botanist Joseph Banks; names Cape Moreton, Point Lookout and Glass House Mountains. Takes possession of eastern Australia, naming it New South Wales.
- 1799 Captain Matthew Flinders explores Moreton and Hervey bays; names Red Cliff Point (now Clontarf Point) but the name Redcliffe is used by a nearby town, Pumice-stone River (now Pumicestone Passage). Also lands on Coochiemudlo Island.

== 19th century ==
- 1823 Emancipated convicts John Finnegan, Richard Parsons, and Thomas Pamphlett are shipwrecked off Moreton Island while looking for timber (a fourth person, John Thompson, died at sea). Following a quarrel, Parsons continues north while others stay on the island.
- 1823 Surveyor-general John Oxley arrives at Bribie Island to evaluate Moreton Bay as a site for penal settlement. Finnegan and Pamphlett who guide him to the Brisbane River; name Peel Island, Pine River and Deception Bay.
- 1824 Oxley discovers Parsons and returns him to Sydney.
- 1824 First Commandant Lt. Henry Miller arrives at Red Cliffe Pt from Sydney with soldiers, a storekeeper and their families, John Oxley, botanist Allan Cunningham, stock and seeds.
- 1824 Amity Moreton Thompson is the first settler child born in the colony.
- 1825 Shipping channel via South Passage found; settlement moves to Brisbane River; first convict buildings built along William St.
- 1825 Edmund Lockyer of the 57th Regiment explores the Brisbane River. Notes flood debris 100 feet above river levels at Mount Crosby, finds first coal deposits. Redbank is named after the soil colour.
- 1826 Captain Patrick Logan takes over as commandant of the colony and begins an extensive stone building program using convict labour. Discovers Southport bar and Logan River.
- 1827 Patrick Logan establishes arable land near the settlement on the Brisbane River at New Farm to feed the growing colony.
- 1827 Allan Cunningham leaves Hunter Region to seek link via New England Tableland to Darling Downs.
- 1827 Indigenous resistance leader "Napoleon" is exiled to St. Helena Island. Aborigines raid maize plots and resist advances. There is frequent conflict until the 1840s.
- 1828 Cunningham discovers gap in the Great Dividing Range, providing access from Moreton Bay to Darling Downs. Also explores Esk-Lockyer basin and upper Brisbane Valley in 1829.
- 1828 The Old Windmill constructed at Wickham Terrace.
- 1829 Moreton Bay Aborigines are seriously affected by smallpox.
- 1830 Captain Logan mysteriously murdered near Esk, commemorated in folk song, "The Convict's Lament".
- 1831 Moreton Bay settlement population reaches 1241, including 1066 convicts.
- 1833 Ship Stirling Castle wrecked on Swain Reef; first of many ships to wreck on Queensland coast over next 40 years.
- 1836 Quaker missionaries report Moreton Bay Indigenous population infected with venereal disease from American whalers.
- 1837 Brisbane's pioneering Petrie family arrives in Moreton Bay. Andrew Petrie (builder and stonemason) is clerk of government works; stays on with wife Mary and five children after penal settlement closes. Son John Petrie becomes Brisbane's first mayor; other son Tom writes sympathetically about local Indigenous people.
- 1838 at "Zion" (present day Nundah), the first permanent free European settlement was established 8km north of Brisbane by German Moravian missionaries who sought to educate the local Aboriginal people.
- 1839 Calls to cease convict transportation successful; Moreton Bay is closed as a penal settlement. 2062 men and 150 women served sentences at the settlement, half of them being Irish; 10 percent died, 700 fled, 98 never recaptured.
- 1840 Escaped convict John Baker surrenders after 14 years of living with Indigenous Australians.
- 1841 Indigenous people Merridio and Neugavil are executed at Wickham Terrace windmill for the murder of surveyor Stapylton and his assistant in Logan.
- 1842 New South Wales Governor George Gipps proclaims Moreton Bay a free settlement. Land is offered for sale from Sydney.
- 1842–1855 War of Southern Queensland.
- 1846 Squatter and entrepreneur Evan Mackenzie succeeds in making Brisbane a port independent from Sydney.
- 1846 Recorded population of Moreton Bay area is 4000 Aborigines and 2257 migrants.
- 1848 First 240 government-assisted British migrants arrive in Brisbane. First Chinese labourers arrive.
- 1849 Rev Dr J.D. Lang, local clergyman and journalist, brings his first English, Irish, Welsh and Scottish migrants with unauthorised promise of land grants. Government rations issued to prevent starvation. Lang envisages a colony of self-sufficient, thrifty and hard-working farmers, workers and artisans.
- 1849 Brisbane School of Arts established.
- 1849 William Pettigrew arrives in colony. He later becomes the mayor of Brisbane in 1870 and is a member of the Legislative Assembly of Queensland between 1877 and 1894.
- 1850 Areas beyond inner Brisbane suburbs, such as Bulimba, Coorparoo, Enoggera, Nundah, Sherwood and Stafford are used for agriculture and grazing until the 1880s.
- 1850 Displaced aborigines from Bribie Island, Redcliffe peninsula and Wide Bay make gunyah camps in Breakfast Creek/Eagle Farm region (until the 1860s).
- 1850 Arthur Lyon sends sample of cotton from New Farm to The Great Exhibition in London.
- 1851 Influenza epidemic hits Brisbane (lasting in 1852).
- 1855 Nearly 1000 German migrants arrive in Brisbane after political unrest and the introduction of compulsory military training; most settle in the Nundah area.
- 1855 (5 January) Aboriginal resistance leader Dundalli hanged near current Post Office; large-scale protests by Indigenous people.
- 1855 (21 February) Walter Hill appointed first superintendent of the Botanic Gardens at Brisbane.
- 1861 Mother Vincent Whitty arrives with five other Sisters of Mercy.
- 1862 Old Government House is completed.
- 1862 Arrival of first of 13 ships of Bishop Quinn's Queensland Immigration Scheme.
- 1863 Eagle Farm Racecourse established.
- 1864 Great Fire of Brisbane.
- 1865 Foundation stone of Parliament House laid.
- 1866 11 September, food riots that were instigated by the recently retrenched workers.
- 1867 Parliament House opens.
- 1873 Construction of Roma Street Railway Station begins.
- 1876 Brisbane connected to Ipswich by rail.
- 1880 J.A. Clarke's Panorama of Brisbane painted.
- 1885 Undue Subdivision of Land Prevention Act 1885.
- 1885 Horse-drawn tram system commences operation.
- 1885 Yungaba Immigration Centre designed.
- 1887 Radical newspaper The Boomerang founded by William Lane.
- 1888 Brisbane connected to Sydney by rail with break of gauge at Wallangarra.
- 1890 The Worker newspaper founded.
- 1892 The Catholic Age (later Catholic Leader) newspaper founded.
- 1893 Brisbane flood.
- 1894 Women's Equal Franchise Association founded.
- 1894 T.P. Lucas's novel Ruins of Brisbane in the Year 2000.
- 1895 The Gabba set aside as cricket ground.
- 1895 Queensland Art Gallery established.
- 1896 Capsize of the ferry Pearl.
- 1896 Brisbane Public Library (now State Library) established.
- 1897 Electric trams introduced.
- 1899 Ministry of Anderson Dawson sworn in, the world's first Labour government.
- 1899 Queensland Museum leaves the Old State Library Building to move into Exhibition Hall (later called the Old Museum), at Gregory Terrace, Bowen Hills.
- 1900 Queensland Country Life newspaper prints recipe for lamington cakes.

== 20th century ==
- 1901 Celebrations held to mark Federation, on New Year's Day.
- 1901 Fire alarms and pillar hydrants introduced to Brisbane city streets.
- 1902 Central railway station in Ann Street, Brisbane completed.
- 1902 Brisbane officially designated city status by the Government of Queensland.
- 1903 Samuel Griffith appointed first Chief Justice of the High Court of Australia.
- 1906 Construction of St John's Anglican Cathedral begins.
- 1908 Enoggera Barracks officially established.
- 1909 Government House opens at Bardon.
- 1909 University of Queensland opens near Parliament House.
- 1912 Brisbane General Strike.
- 1917 Conscription disturbance at the Brisbane School of Arts.
- 1917 Raid on the Queensland Government Printing Office.
- 1917 James Duhig begins 48-year term as Catholic Archbishop of Brisbane.
- 1919 Red Flag riots.
- 1922 Queensland Government purchases privately owned tram system and establishes the Brisbane Tramways Trust.
- 1924 Assassination of Albert Whitford.
- 1924 XXXX beer brand introduced.
- 1925 Amalgamation of 25 local government areas to form the City of Greater Brisbane.
- 1925 Eagle Farm Airport opened.
- 1925 Queensland Government transfers responsibility for the tram system from the Brisbane Tramways Trust to the Brisbane City Council.
- 1927 Lone Pine Koala Sanctuary founded.
- 1927 Work begins on never-completed Holy Name Catholic Cathedral.
- 1927 Pitch drop experiment begins.
- 1928 Sir Charles Kingsford Smith lands in Brisbane, from San Francisco, United States, after the first flight across the Pacific Ocean.
- 1930 Shrine of Remembrance opened.
- 1930 Brisbane City Hall opened.
- 1932 Unbroken Brisbane-Sydney rail service opens.
- 1939 Forgan Smith building completed at the St. Lucia campus of the University of Queensland. (Forgan Smith building was named after the, then, Premier of Queensland).
- 1940 Story Bridge completed.
- 1940 Meanjin literary journal founded.
- 1941 Banyo Catholic Seminary opened.
- 1942 General Douglas MacArthur arrives in Brisbane and takes offices in the AMP building (later called MacArthur Central) for the Pacific campaign during World War II.
- 1942 Battle of Brisbane.
- 1943 Hospital ship Centaur torpedoed off Moreton Island with loss of 268 lives.
- 1943 23 killed in crash of RAAF DC-3.
- 1945 Former Russian Prime Minister Alexander Kerensky resides in Clayfield.
- 1946 Following a delay caused by World War II the University of Queensland began its move from George Street, Brisbane, to its St Lucia campus, which it completed in 1972.
- 1947 First concert of Queensland Symphony Orchestra.
- 1948 University of Queensland Press founded.
- 1954 Queen Elizabeth II visits during Royal Tour.
- 1955 Wickham Terrace attack.
- 1955 Australian Journal of Politics and History founded.
- 1957 Conservatorium of Music opened.
- 1960 Attempted hijacking of TAA flight 408.
- 1961 130 votes in Moreton save Menzies government from defeat in federal election.
- 1962 Paddington tram depot fire.
- 1963 Gibb Brothers gain deal with Festival Records under the name Bee Gees.
- 1964 Adoption of first Brisbane Town Plan.
- 1964 Royal Commission chaired by Harry Gibbs finds no evidence of police corruption.
- 1965 Queensland Institute of Technology (later Queensland University of Technology) established.
- 1968 Brisbane City Council announces conversion of tram and trolley-bus systems to all-bus operations.
- 1968 Romantic drama Age of Consent filmed partly in Brisbane, with James Mason and Helen Mirren.
- 1969 Tram and trolley bus systems close, new Victoria Bridge opened.
- 1971 Demonstrations and injuries during state of emergency for Springbok tour.
- 1971 Geoffrey Rush begins acting career with Queensland Theatre Company.
- 1972 Suspicious death of police corruption whistleblower Shirley Brifman.
- 1973 Whiskey Au Go Go fire in which 15 people are killed.
- 1974 Brisbane River flooding, the result of continual heavy rain from Cyclone Wanda, causes major damage across city.
- 1974 Corinda landslip.
- 1975 Griffith University opens.
- 1975 David Malouf's novel Johnno portrays growing up in Brisbane.
- 1976 Two dead in Spring Hill shooting.
- 1979 Demolition of the Bellevue Hotel.
- 1980 First State of Origin rugby league game played at Lang Park.
- 1982 Commonwealth Games.
- 1983 Labor powerbrokers meet Bill Hayden in Brisbane and force his resignation as federal opposition leader.
- 1984 Queensland Performing Arts Centre opened at the Queensland Cultural Centre.
- 1984 Fine Cotton ring-in scandal at Eagle Farm Racecourse.
- 1985 Brisbane Bullets achieve first NBL men's basketball championship.
- 1986 Queensland Museum moves to the Queensland Cultural Centre.
- 1986 Tennyson and Bulimba coal-fired power station closed down.
- 1986 Gateway Bridge completed.
- 1986 Visit of Pope John Paul II.
- 1987 Hearings begin of Fitzgerald Inquiry into police corruption.
- 1988 State Library of Queensland leaves the old State Library Building to move to the Queensland Cultural Centre.
- 1988 World Expo 88 held at reclaimed industrial land at South Brisbane.
- 1988 Debut of Brisbane Broncos rugby league team.
- 1989 Queensland Institute of Technology changed status to Queensland University of Technology.
- 1989 Hugh Lunn's memoir Over the Top with Jim portrays a Brisbane childhood.
- 1990 Gwen Harwood's Blessed City describes life during World War II.
- 1991 Trial of former premier Joh Bjelke-Petersen for perjury results in hung jury.
- 1994 Controversy when Miles Franklin Award-winning novelist "Helen Demidenko" revealed to be non-Ukrainian.
- 1994 John Birmingham's He Died with a Felafel in His Hand recounts Brisbane sharehouse living.
- 1995 Treasury Casino opens.
- 1996 Brisbane Festival first held.
- 1998 Ian Frazer completes first human trials for Gardasil vaccine against cervical cancer.
- 1998 Success of rock group Powderfinger's album Internationalist.

== 21st century ==
- 2001 Commonwealth Heads of Government Meeting (CHOGM) was scheduled for Brisbane, but postponed after heightened security concerns resulting from terrorist attacks on New York City Instead it was held in Coolum in early 2002.
- 2001 Goodwill Games Opening ceremony included performances from traditional owners – Nunukul Yuggera Aboriginal Dancers, The Corrs, Keith Urban.
- 2001 Anglican Archbishop Peter Hollingworth appointed Governor-General.
- 2004 New Lord Mayor Campbell Newman initiates TransApex package of bridge, traffic and tunnel projects.
- 2004 Schapelle Corby flies from Brisbane to Bali, leading to arrest and nine-year imprisonment for drug importation.
- 2008 Quentin Bryce appointed Governor-General.
- 2011 Brisbane River flooding.
- 2012 Li Cunxin appointed artistic director of Queensland Ballet.
- 2012 Murder of Allison Baden-Clay.
- 2013 Brisbane City Hall reopened after three-year restoration.
- 2014 2014 Brisbane hailstorm.
- 2014 2014 Australian counter-terrorism raids.
- 2014 Host city of the 9th G-20 Summit – Opening Ceremony included performances from Nunukul Yuggera Aboriginal Dancers and Bangurra Dance Theatre.
- 2014 Success of The Veronicas' self-titled album.
- 2015 Murder of Tiahleigh Palmer.
- 2016 Dami Im placed second in Eurovision Song Contest.
- 2017 Construction of Cross River Rail begins.
- 2018 Trent Dalton's semi-autobiographical novel Boy Swallows Universe describes teenage trauma.
- 2018 Premiere of Bluey animated children's TV series.
- 2020 Trials of promising COVID-19 vaccine terminated over false positives to HIV antibodies.
- 2020 Murder of Hannah Clarke and her three children by estranged husband.
- 2021 Brisbane selected as host city of the 2032 Summer Olympics.
- 2022 Inquiry finds major flaws in Forensic and Scientific Services DNA testing of crime scene evidence.

== See also ==
- History of Brisbane
