= History of Brisbane =

The written history of Brisbane begins in 1799, when Matthew Flinders undertook the first recorded European exploration of Moreton Bay. European settlement began in September 1824 with the establishment of a British penal outpost at Redcliffe, which was relocated in May 1825 to the banks of the Brisbane River, establishing the site of the modern city. Long before European exploration and colonisation, the Brisbane River valley was a major cultural, economic and ceremonial landscape for the Yagara, Turrbal and Quandamooka peoples for more than 22,000 years. Since its foundation, Brisbane has grown into a major global metropolis and is the second-oldest mainland capital city in the country.

From its early convict era, the settlement developed into a free township and emerging port city, shaped by conflict and successive waves of 19th century migration. After becoming the capital of Queensland following separation in 1859, the city expanded economically and demographically as the Australian colonies matured into a federated nation. The creation of the unified City of Brisbane in 1925 consolidated dozens of municipalities into a single metropolitan authority, transforming Brisbane into Australia’s largest municipal city under a single local government area. In the 20th century, Brisbane experienced industrial unrest, major floods, and significant wartime importance as the headquarters of the Allied South West Pacific Area command during the Second World War.

The later decades of the 20th century were marked by intense political contest, civil rights activism and urban transformation, as movements for democratic reform cooccurred with large-scale urban renewal and infrastructure development, shaped Brisbane into a modern Australian metropolis. In the 21st century, rapid population growth, riverfront redevelopment and major cultural and sporting events have further elevated Brisbane’s status, and the city has emerged as a major political, economic and cultural centre in the Asia-Pacific.

== Toponymy ==
Indigenous names for the Brisbane region long predate European settlement and reflect the cultural geography of the Yagara and Turrbal peoples. 19th and 20th century linguistic records identify Maiwar as the traditional name for the Brisbane River, used across Yagara- and Turrbal-speaking groups.

The peninsula now occupied by the modern central business district was known as Meeanjin, referring to its distinctive pointed, triangular shape formed by a double bend in the river. The Turrbal name Tumamun applied to the elevated district north-west of the CBD around present-day Kelvin Grove and Herston, referring to the pointed hill and watercourse that characterised the area.

The name Brisbane is named to honour Sir Thomas Brisbane (1773–1860) who was Governor of New South Wales from 1821 to 1825. When it was given its name and declared as a town in 1834, to replace its penal colony status, Brisbane was still part of the Colony of New South Wales.

Thomas Brisbane was a British Army officer and astronomer who was born in Ayrshire, Scotland. The name Brisbane is associated with a Scottish clan, thought to be derived from the Anglo-French words "brise bane", meaning "break bone".

== Prehistory ==
Indigenous occupation of the Brisbane region extends back more than 22,000 years, with archaeological evidence demonstrating long-term settlement particularly along the Brisbane River (Maiwar) and its tributaries. Before European settlement, the wider region supported an estimated population of 6,000 to 10,000 people across coastal and riverine districts.

The area is traditionally associated with the Jagera, Turrbal and Quandamooka peoples. Linguistically, the Brisbane region lies within the broader Yuggera language area, within which the Turrbal language is included.

A Turrbal cultural organisation states that early documents identify the Turrbal as the sole traditional owners at the moment of first sustained European presence; however, contemporary linguistic and native-title research places Turrbal identity within the wider Yagara/Yuggera cultural region.

Archaeological evidence confirms frequent habitation around Musgrave Park, along the river and throughout the surrounding ridgelines. The river and its wetlands supplied abundant resources including fish, shellfish and plant foods, and productive fishing grounds often developed into long-standing campsites. The surrounding district consisted primarily of open woodlands maintained through Indigenous land management, with rainforest pockets occurring along some bends of the river.

Several major camps played central roles in regional movement and seasonal occupation. Barambin, the area later known as York’s Hollow, functioned as a major gathering and meeting ground, while Woolloon-cappem, later known as Kurilpa extended across parts of modern South Brisbane and West End. Additional camps existed around the wetlands of Woolloongabba and the ridges around Musgrave Park. These camps continued to operate into the early colonial period and influenced the location of early European settlement.

The peninsula on which the Brisbane central business district now stands, traditionally known as Meeanjin, occupied a strategic point at a natural river crossing and lay between several of these major camps. Its elevated position and access to surrounding resource areas made it an important location in long-standing patterns of movement and settlement.

== Early European exploration (Late 18th to Early 19th century) ==
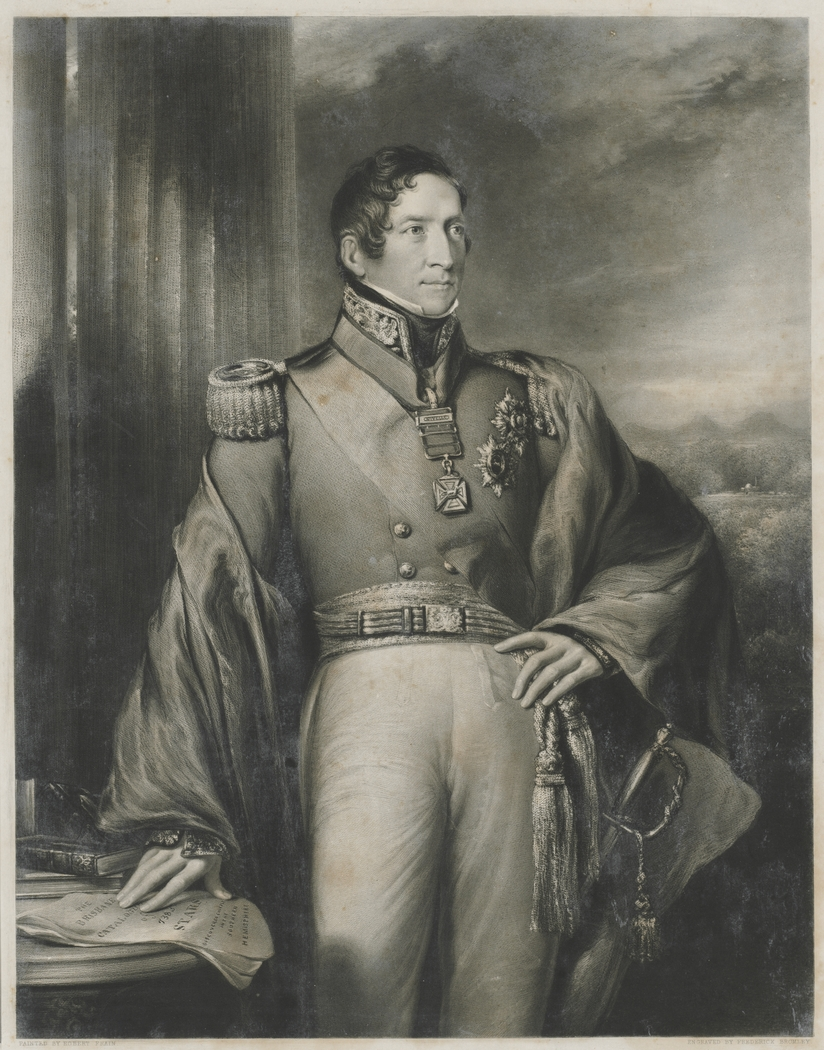
Portrait of Major-General Sir Thomas Brisbane, after whom the city and river were named

European knowledge of the region began in 1770, when British navigator James Cook charted the outer coastline of Moreton Bay during his passage along the eastern seaboard. From offshore he identified Cape Moreton, Point Lookout and the distant Glass House Mountains, naming the bay after James Douglas, 14th Earl of Morton (later misspelled as “Moreton”). However, Cook did not enter the bay itself, as the offshore islands and extensive sandbanks obscured its entrances and made the coastline appear unbroken.

In July 1799 the first detailed European exploration of the region occurred when Matthew Flinders entered Moreton Bay during his survey voyage from Port Jackson to Hervey Bay. Aboard the Norfolk, Flinders landed at Red Cliff Point near present-day Woody Point in Redcliffe and made further landfalls at Coochiemudlo Island and within the Pumicestone Passage. Over fifteen days he charted much of the bay’s western shoreline, noting its shoals, islands and estuaries. Although Flinders suspected the presence of a major river from the discoloured water and strong tidal flows, he was unable to locate the entrance to the Brisbane River.

In 1823 four castaways, Thomas Pamphlett, John Finnegan, John Thompson and Richard Parsons were found living with Indigenous groups near the river mouth after being blown north from Sydney and wrecked on Moreton Island. Their accounts prompted Surveyor-General John Oxley to investigate the region later that year. After meeting the castaways, Oxley proceeded approximately 100 kilometres (62 mi) up the river he later named the Brisbane River in honour of Governor Thomas Brisbane. He explored as far as present-day Goodna in the City of Ipswich, charting the river’s reaches and identifying several promising sites for a penal outpost. Oxley and his party named numerous localities along the way, including Breakfast Creek (where they cooked breakfast), Oxley Creek and Seventeen Mile Rocks. His favourable assessment directly led to the establishment of the Moreton Bay penal settlement in 1824.

== 19th Century ==
=== Moreton Bay Penal Settlement (1824–1842) ===
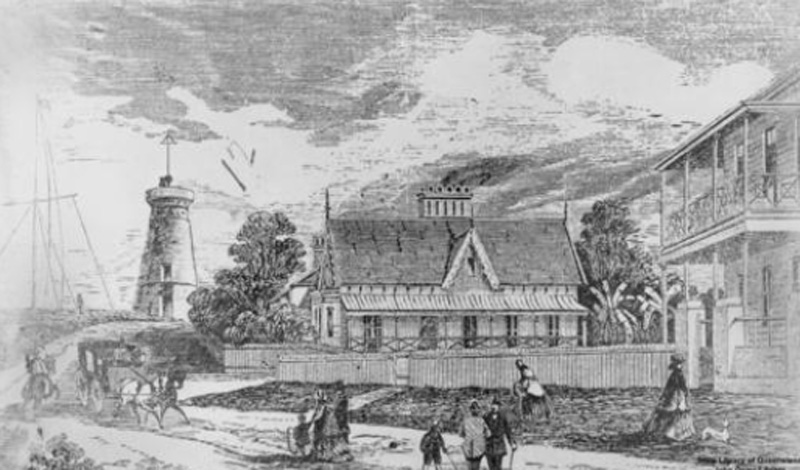
The Old Windmill built in 1828, a site of convict punishments and executions, is the oldest surviving building in Queensland.

The first convict settlement in the region was established at Redcliffe Point on 13 September 1824 under Lieutenant Henry Miller. Meanwhile, Oxley and Allan Cunningham explored further up the Brisbane River in search of water, landing at the present location of North Quay. Less than one year later, in May 1825, the colony was moved south from Redcliffe to a peninsula on the Brisbane River, site of the present central business district, called "Meanjin" by its Turrbal inhabitants. The settlement was established as a "prison within a prison", a remote station for recidivist convicts considered too dangerous or unmanageable in Sydney. Along with Norfolk Island, Moreton Bay was soon regarded as one of the harshest penal settlements in New South Wales.

By the end of 1825, the official population of the new station was recorded as “45 males and 2 females”. Until 1859, when Queensland was separated from the state of New South Wales, the name Moreton Bay was used to describe the new settlement and surrounding areas. "Edenglassie" was the name first proposed for the growing town by Chief Justice Francis Forbes. In July 1828 work began on the construction of the Commissariat Store, which remains intact today as a museum of the Royal Historical Society of Queensland and is one of only two surviving convict-era buildings in Queensland, the other being the Old Windmill on Wickham Terrace.

Under the command of Captain Patrick Logan the penal colony expanded significantly. Convict numbers rose from around 200 to over 1,000 men, and substantial brick and stone buildings—including barracks, a hospital and a school—were constructed. The Old Windmill, built in 1828 and used for grinding grain and administering punishments, remains the oldest surviving structure in Queensland. Logan became notorious for severe use of the cat-o’-nine-tails, often exceeding the official maximum of 50 lashes. Convict labour also established farms along the river flats, including those that later formed the City Botanic Gardens.

Conflict broke out between the penal settlement and Indigenous groups during 1827–1828, most notably in the Corn Field Raids at South Bank and Kangaroo Point. Contemporary accounts described this resistance as an attempt to “starve out” the settlement by destroying its crops and cutting off its food supply.

Tensions escalated again in 1832–1833 during the Moreton Bay conflict, a series of clashes between the North Stradbroke Island settlements at Dunwich and Amity and Quandamooka groups. Attacks on convict work parties, boat crews and timber-getters prompted reprisals by military detachments. Recent research situates these clashes within a broader pattern of coordinated Indigenous resistance across southern Queensland during the 1830s.

The settlement declined after transportation to Moreton Bay ended in 1839, and the penal station formally closed in 1842, clearing the way for free settlement on the Brisbane River.

=== War of Southern Queensland (1843–1855) ===
The Brisbane district became a focal point during the War of Southern Queensland, which has been described by several historians as one of the largest and most sustained campaigns of the Australian frontier wars. Following the opening of the district to free settlement in 1842, rapid pastoral expansion around Brisbane and South East Queensland intensified pressures on Indigenous land tenure. Dispossession, escalating conflict, and incidents such as the Kilcoy poisoning contributed to a higher degree of coordination between the Indigenous nations of the Jagera, Wakka Wakka, Kabi Kabi and Jinibara. Contemporary observers sometimes described these alliances as acting under the banner of ‘United Tribes’.

Raids on outstations, drays and river craft were led by Multuggerah and allied Jagera and Yuggera warbands, particularly along the routes across the Main Range and through the Upper Brisbane and Lockyer Valley. Retaliatory expeditions were launched by soldiers, mounted police and armed settlers operating from Brisbane. These engagements placed considerable pressure on early pastoral ventures, with several stations on the Upper Brisbane and Main Range abandoned, and runs between the Brisbane and Mary Rivers periodically evacuated. Demographic analysis by Ørsted-Jensen likewise notes that early pastoral runs north of Brisbane were “abandoned for periods” during the height of the conflict.

By the mid-1840s, resistance activity had shifted closer to Brisbane, with raids and reprisals occurring on the town’s northern approaches. Between 1846 and 1849 British military detachments undertook repeated operations around York’s Hollow, including the multi-day 1846 siege in which Turrbal defenders reportedly returned fire with muskets. By the late 1840s, resistance leaders had moved operations toward Brisbane’s north-eastern corridor, prompting police and settler expeditions to Sandgate, Nundah, the Pine River and Redcliffe districts, where Undanbi groups maintained armed opposition.

The capture and public execution of Dundalli in Brisbane in January 1855 is widely regarded by historians as marking the end of organised resistance in the region. Modern assessments estimate that at least several hundred Indigenous people were killed during the wider conflict in southern Queensland. Colonial deaths have been variously estimated between about 700 and 1,000, while Indigenous losses have been placed between 1,000 and 5,000.

=== Free Settlement and the Emergence of a River Port (1842–1859) ===
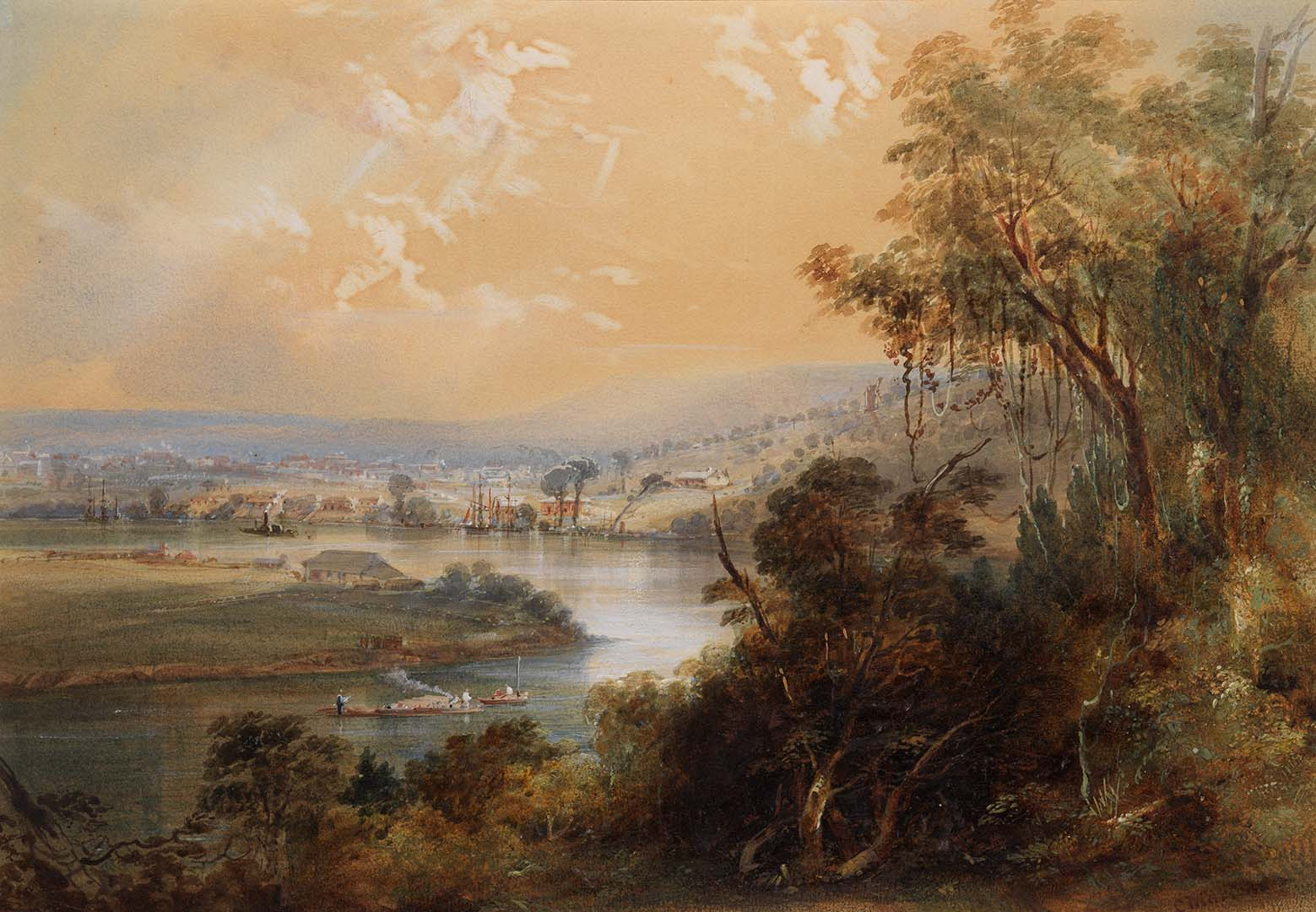
Brisbane c.1855, Conrad Martens

In 1842 the Moreton Bay district was officially opened to free European settlement, following years of debate in Britain over the viability and expense of maintaining Brisbane as a penal station. Declining convict numbers, rising costs of transporting goods from Sydney, and the discovery of a route to the fertile Darling Downs by Allan Cunningham in 1828 all contributed to the transition toward a free settlement economy. The penal station was formally closed in 1842.

One of the earliest organised free communities was the German Lutheran settlement at Zion Hill (modern Nundah), established in 1838. It became the first enduring free European settlement in what is now Queensland. Larger German agricultural communities soon followed along the Logan and Albert rivers, encouraged by immigration schemes promoted by figures such as John Dunmore Lang and Johann Heussler.

Town planning for the new settlement began in 1839 when surveyors Robert Dixon, Stapylton and Warner were commissioned to undertake the first trigonometrical survey of the Brisbane River valley. A formal town plan was drafted by Dixon in 1839–1840 and completed by Henry Wade in 1842–1843.

Assisted migration accelerated after the arrival of the Artemisia in 1848, the first government-sponsored immigrant vessel to Moreton Bay. Scottish migrants aboard the Fortitude in 1849 settled temporarily around York’s Hollow before establishing Fortitude Valley.

Timber-getting, small-scale agriculture, and river transport became the foundations of the emerging economy. Vast stands of hoop pine, blue gum and ironbark were harvested from the surrounding forests, while cleared land was quickly taken up for grazing and market gardening. Major floods in 1841 caused extensive damage to the settlement, demonstrating both the risks and economic importance of the Brisbane River.

Relations between free settlers and Indigenous groups remained marked by dispossession, conflict, and negotiation. While resistance leaders such as Dundalli and Yilbung continued to challenge the expanding settlement, many Turrbal and neighbouring peoples also engaged in trade and labour within the township, supplying fish, firewood, water-carrying, fencing and stock work. By the 1850s Indigenous labour formed an important part of Brisbane’s riverine and pastoral economy.

By the mid-1850s Brisbane had developed into a modest but expanding river port, with wharves, warehouses, ferries and small shipyards clustering along the lower Brisbane River. Regular trade connected the town to Sydney, the Darling Downs and the Bay Islands. The Separation of Queensland from New South Wales in December 1859 led to Brisbane being chosen as the capital of the new colony.

=== Blackbirding era (1860s–1890s) ===
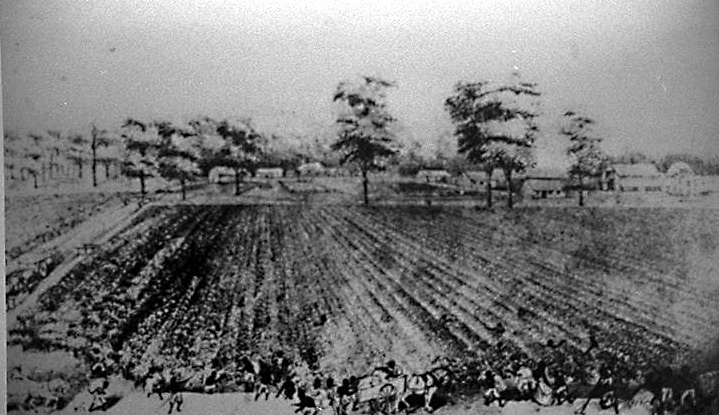
Drawing of Captain Towns' "Townsvale" Cotton Plantation on the Logan River, with South Sea Islanders toiling the fields c.1865

From the 1860s to the 1890s, Brisbane became one of Queensland’s principal ports involved in the recruitment and transport of South Sea Islander indentured labourers, a system often described as a form of slavery. ‘Recruiting’ vessels operated from Brisbane’s wharves and regularly sailed to the Loyalty Islands, New Hebrides, and Solomon Islands, returning with labourers who were contracted to cotton, sugar and other plantations in South East Queensland.

Many of these men and boys were taken to plantations along the Logan, Albert and Brisbane rivers, where they worked on cotton and later sugar estates such as the Ormiston Plantation owned by Louis Hope. Numerous contemporary reports in Brisbane newspapers alleged kidnapping, deception and violence in the recruitment process, prompting several official inquiries held in the city.

By the end of the nineteenth century more than 60,000 Pacific Islanders had been brought to Queensland, the majority working within the colony’s expanding plantation economy, with Brisbane functioning as a key administrative and shipping centre for the trade. Modern scholars describe Queensland’s South Sea Islander labour trade as “quasi-slavery”, noting parallels with global slave systems, and it has been referred to by some historians and Australian South Sea Islander organisations as the “Pacific slave trade”.

Following Federation, the Pacific Island Labourers Act 1901 mandated the mass deportation of most Islanders, though several hundred were permitted to remain and others managed to avoid deportation by hiding themselves. Those who remained formed the basis of the modern Australian South Sea Islander communities of south-east Queensland. In the 1990s, both the Australian and Queensland government formally recognised Australian South Sea Islanders as a distinct cultural group.

=== Late 19th Century (1859–1900) ===
With the separation of Queensland from New South Wales in December 1859, Brisbane became the capital and administrative centre of the new colony. The newly proclaimed Municipality of Brisbane held its first council elections that year, with John Petrie elected as the city’s inaugural mayor.

Major civic construction followed the establishment of colonial government. Notable public buildings included Parliament House (1868) designed by Charles Tiffin, the Yungaba Immigration Centre (1885), the Treasury Building (1886) designed by John James Clark, and the Old Museum Building (1891). These works reflected the ambitions of the new colonial capital and the increasing use of Italianate and Renaissance Revival architectural styles.

Brisbane in the late 19th century developed an unusually diverse population for a colonial Australian city. Its position as the closest major port to the Pacific, combined with labour shortages, encouraged earlier and more varied migration streams than elsewhere in Australia. German farming communities, established by the 1860s, lived alongside substantial Scottish and Irish populations; a concentrated Chinese quarter developed at Frog's Hollow, while a small but active Jewish congregation emerged during the same period. From the 1880s Brisbane also became home to one of Australia’s earliest Russian migrant communities. Historians describe Brisbane as “unusually cosmopolitan for its size,” noting that its blend of European, Asian and Pacific communities was uncommon among Australian colonial cities. Brisbane’s riverfront wharves drew a similarly mixed workforce of maritime labourers, including Melanesian South Sea Islanders, early Lebanese and Syrian hawkers, small Italian and Greek communities, and Scandinavian and American sailors.

Economic hardship also marked parts of the decade. During the 1866 financial crisis hundreds of unemployed workers gathered in Queen Street demanding relief in what became known as the “Bread or Blood” protests, during which demonstrators attempted to seize food supplies from the Commissariat Store.

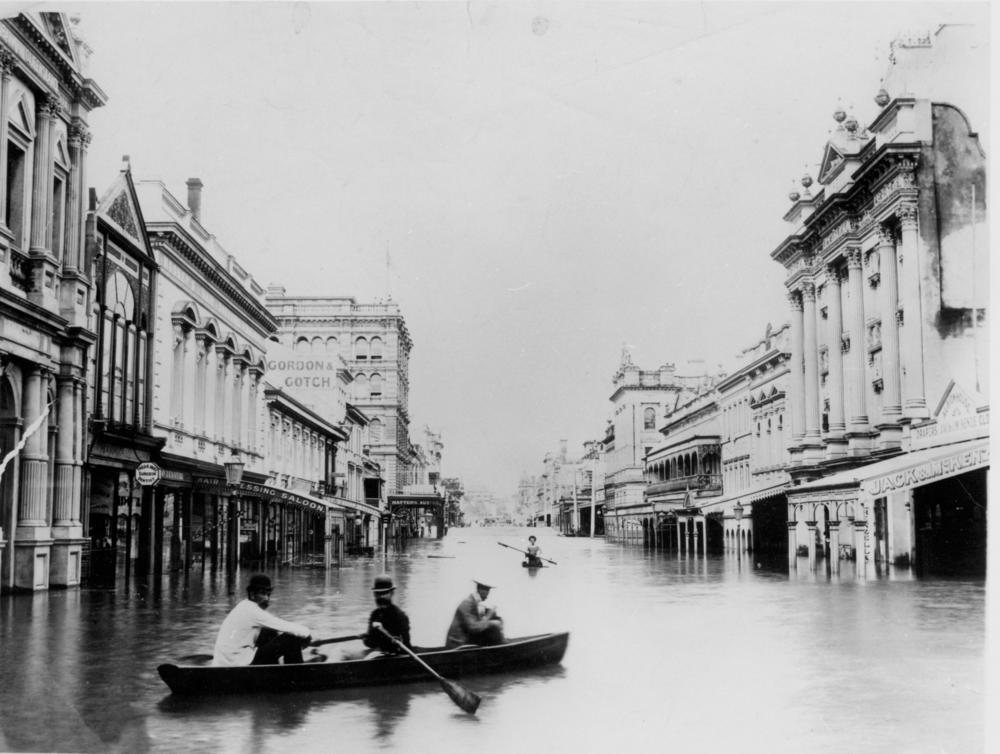
The Great Flood of 1893 was one of the worst disasters in the city's history, flooding in Queen Street.

The late 19th century also saw several disasters that reshaped the city. The Great fire of Brisbane in 1864 destroyed much of Queen Street and prompted a shift from timber to masonry construction in the central business district. Floods remained a persistent danger; the catastrophic “Black February” flood of 1893 inundated large areas of the town and destroyed the first permanent Victoria Bridge, severing the city’s primary river crossing. Brisbane’s worst maritime disaster occurred three years later, when the ferry Pearl capsized in 1896, with only around 40 of the 80–100 passengers surviving.

New infrastructure transformed mobility and daily life. The extension of the Ipswich railway to Roma Street in 1879 linked the town centre to the interior, while horse-drawn trams began operation in 1885 before later electrification, remaining central to urban transport into the twentieth century. In 1882, a demonstration of electric street lighting along Queen Street became one of the earliest recorded uses of electricity for public lighting in the world.

As the city expanded across the surrounding valley basin, the distinctive Queenslander house evolved into the dominant architectural form. Elevated timber construction, broad verandahs and ventilated interiors provided a practical response to Brisbane’s subtropical climate, becoming a defining characteristic of the city’s cultural landscape by 1900.

== Early to Mid-20th Century (1901–1967) ==
=== Federation era (1901–1914) ===
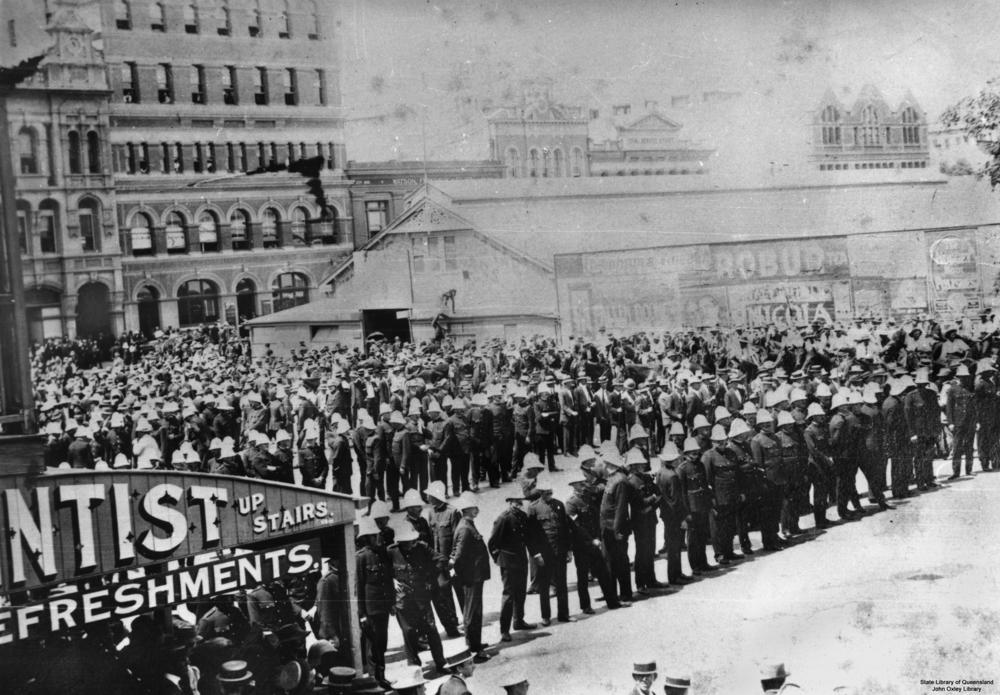
A demonstration in Albert Square during the 1912 general strike

Brisbane entered the twentieth century as the capital of the newly federated state of Queensland. Celebrations marking the birth of the Commonwealth of Australia in 1901 included civic parades and a triumphal arch in Queen Street, while the Duke of Cornwall and York (later King George V) laid the foundation stone for St John’s Cathedral in May that year. Under the Local Authorities Act 1902, Brisbane was formally designated a city, one of the first three so proclaimed in Queensland.

The founding of the Brisbane Central Technical College in 1908 and the University of Queensland in 1909, initially located at Old Government House before relocating to St Lucia in the late 1930s, contributed to Brisbane’s growing role as an educational centre.

=== First World War and Social Unrest (1914–1919) ===
Brisbane’s early twentieth century was marked by industrial unrest. The 1912 General Strike resulted in violent confrontations between unionists and police in the city’s centre, while during the First World War political tensions escalated when Commonwealth authorities raided the Queensland Government Printing Office in 1917 to seize anti-conscription parliamentary debate records. Post-war hostility toward socialist and Russian communities culminated in the Red Flag riots of 1918–1919, during which returned servicemen clashed with demonstrators in some of Brisbane’s most serious civil disturbances of the era.

The first ceremony to honour the fallen soldiers at Gallipoli was held at St John's Cathedral on 10 June 1915. The tradition would later develop into the national Anzac Day commemorative ceremony.

=== Interwar era (1920–1939) ===
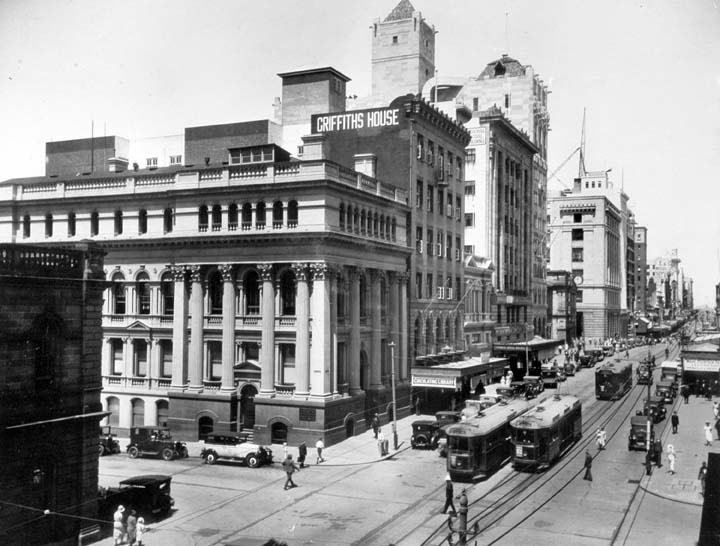
Corner of Queen and Creek street, c.1932

A major civic restructuring occurred in 1925, when twenty local authorities including the former cities of Brisbane and South Brisbane, the towns of Hamilton, Ithaca, Sandgate, Toowong, Windsor and Wynnum, and surrounding shires such as Coorparoo, Enoggera, Kedron, Moggill, Sherwood, Stephens, Taringa, Tingalpa, Toombul and Yeerongpilly were amalgamated to form the unified City of Brisbane, the largest municipal merger in Australian history. The new Brisbane City Hall, opened in 1930, became the symbolic and administrative centre of the expanded metropolis.

Despite the hardships of the Great Depression, the Brisbane City Council undertook substantial public works to stimulate employment and modernise the city. Major projects of the early 1930s included the construction of the William Jolly Bridge, the creation of the Wynnum Wading Pool, and the completion of the commemorative ANZAC Square and Shrine of Remembrance. In 1936–1938, Albert Square was enlarged and renamed King George Square in honour of King George V, accompanied by a new equestrian statue and bronze lion sculptures.

Regional connectivity also improved with the opening of the 2.7-kilometre Hornibrook Bridge in 1935, then one of Australia’s longest bridges. Brisbane’s most significant engineering achievement of the era, the Story Bridge, was completed in 1940, further consolidating the city’s growing metropolitan identity.

=== Second World War: Brisbane as a Pacific Headquarters (1939–1945) ===
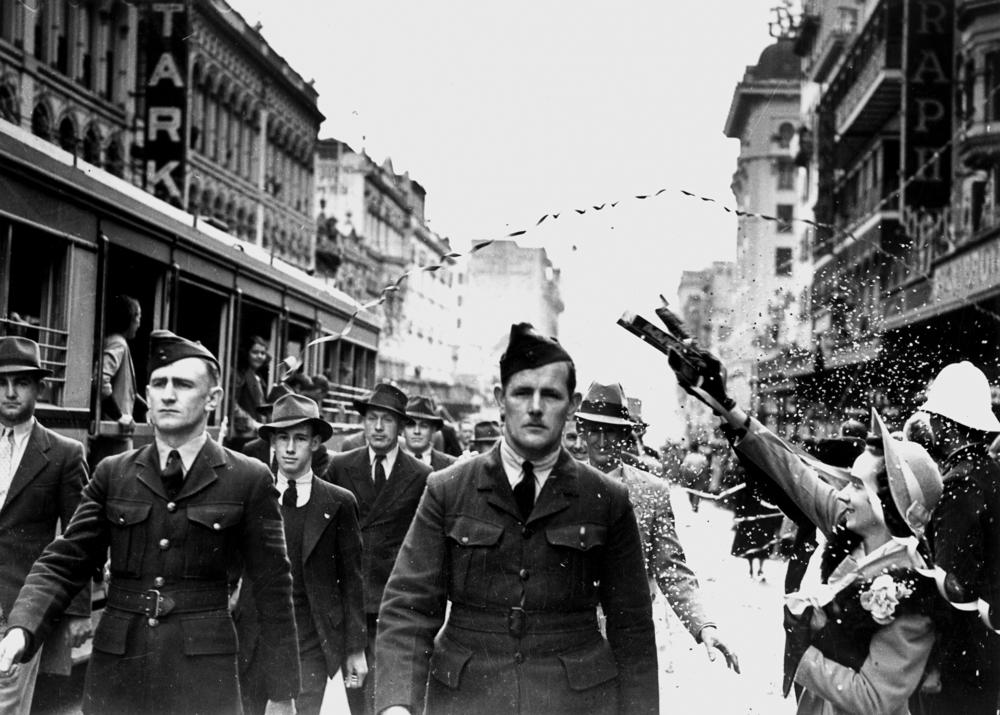
Parade of Royal Australian Air Force servicemen through Queen street, c. 1940

Brisbane played a central role in the defence of Australia during the Second World War. Following Japan’s entry into the conflict, the city became a major staging point for Australian and American forces, with barracks, headquarters and supply depots established across the metropolitan area. Many schools, churches and civic buildings were requisitioned for military use, while the University of Queensland’s St Lucia campus was converted into a large base for the final years of the war.

In July 1942 Brisbane became the headquarters of General Douglas MacArthur and the Allied South West Pacific Area command. MacArthur directed the Pacific campaign from his headquarters in the AMP Building (now MacArthur Central), making Brisbane the principal centre of Allied operational planning on the Australian mainland. The city also hosted the largest American submarine base in the South West Pacific, centred on facilities at New Farm, Teneriffe and the Hamilton wharves.

The presence of tens of thousands of U.S. personnel reshaped the city’s social environment. Racial segregation policies adopted by American forces created tension in Brisbane’s nightlife districts, while growing pressure on housing and transport exacerbated local frustrations. Relations between Australian and American servicemen deteriorated in late 1942, culminating in the Battle of Brisbane on 26–27 November, during which one Australian soldier was killed and hundreds of servicemen injured.

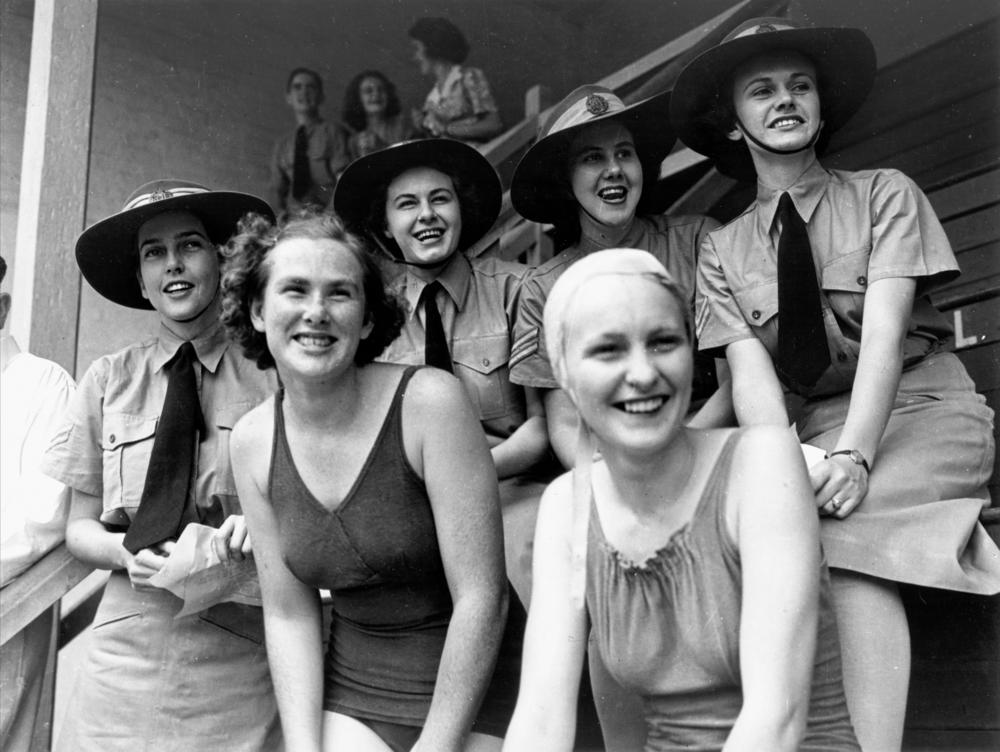
Members of the Women's Auxiliary Australian Air Force in Brisbane, December 1943

Several major Brisbane institutions were repurposed for military use during the war. The present-day MacArthur Central housed MacArthur’s headquarters; the University of Queensland’s St Lucia campus became a large military barracks; and schools such as St Laurence’s College and Somerville House were occupied by American forces. Recreation facilities were also segregated under U.S. military policy, with centres such as the Doctor Carver Club in South Brisbane established specifically for African American servicemen.

A major wartime political controversy, the so-called “Brisbane Line” emerged in 1942. Federal Opposition figures alleged that earlier defence planning foresaw withdrawing to a line just north of Brisbane in the event of invasion, effectively abandoning northern Australia. A Royal Commission later found no such policy had been formally adopted, but the claim shaped wartime political debate and entered Australian popular memory.

Defensive works, including gun batteries, radar stations, searchlight posts and coastal fortifications, were constructed across the metropolitan area and on the islands of Moreton Bay. Venues such as Sunnybank’s Oasis Gardens became popular rest-and-recreation centres for Allied personnel. By 1945, Brisbane had developed into one of the most important Allied administrative and logistics hubs in the Pacific, leaving a lasting legacy on the city’s urban landscape and international connections.

=== Post-War Expansion (1945–1967) ===
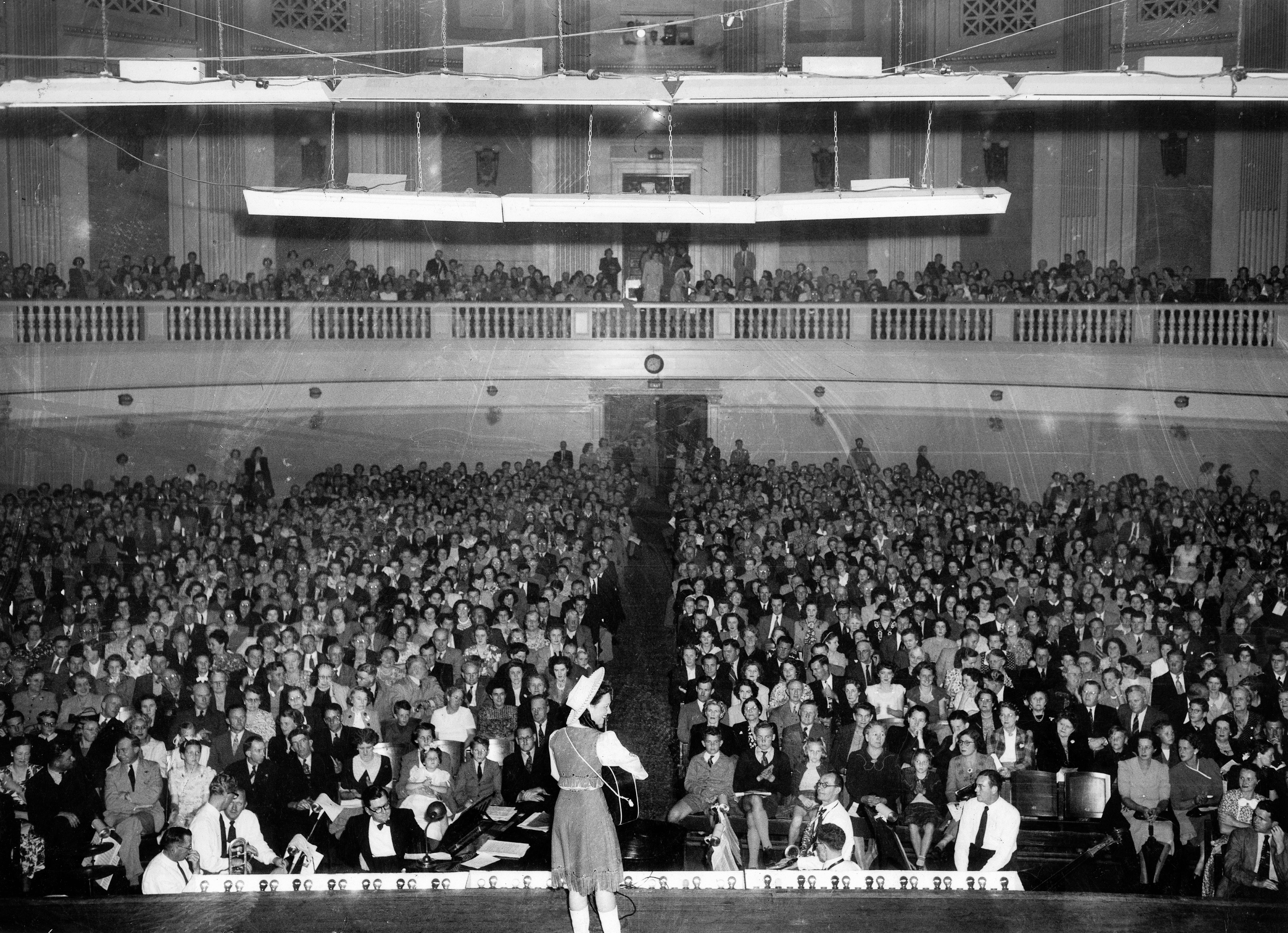
Concert inside the Brisbane City Hall, 1949

The post-war years saw rapid growth driven by substantial immigration from the United Kingdom and southern Europe. Rising car ownership and industrial expansion accelerated suburban development, with large state housing estates constructed at Inala, Zillmere, Stafford Heights and across the city’s middle suburbs.

Infrastructure, however, lagged behind population growth. Much of Brisbane remained unsewered into the 1950s, and water shortages, unsealed roads and nightsoil collection were common across outer suburbs. A comprehensive town plan was not adopted until 1965. A decisive shift occurred with the election of Clem Jones as Lord Mayor in 1961. With town clerk J. C. Slaughter, Jones embarked on a major modernisation program that transformed Brisbane’s utilities and transport. Extensive sewerage construction, road sealing, drainage improvements and expanded power generation at Tennyson and New Farm began to address decades of underinvestment.

Jones also commissioned the influential Wilbur Smith transportation study (1965), which recommended replacing Brisbane’s tram and trolleybus systems with a road- and bus-based network and proposed a large-scale freeway plan. A major setback occurred in 1962 when a fire destroyed the Paddington tram depot and much of the city’s tram fleet, foreshadowing the eventual closure of Brisbane’s tram system later in the decade.

By the late 1960s, Brisbane had grown into a rapidly expanding, highly suburbanised city with modernising services and expanded housing.

== Late-20th Century (1968–2000) ==
=== Conservatism, Civil Rights and Urban Transformation (1968–1987) ===
The election of Joh Bjelke-Petersen as Premier of Queensland in 1968 ushered in a period of conservative dominance that strongly shaped Brisbane’s political and civic environment. His government imposed stringent controls on public assembly, resulting in extensive protest bans and frequent police crackdowns throughout the 1970s and 1980s.

Brisbane consequently became a major centre of civil liberties activism, with anti-apartheid, student and democratic rights groups organising large-scale demonstrations. Violent clashes occurred during the 1971 Springbok tour protests, while Indigenous activists, including Denis Walker, played key roles in the Black Protest movement and in organising prominent Aboriginal rights campaigns during the 1982 Commonwealth Games.

A major event of this period was the 1974 Brisbane flood, which inundated large areas of the metropolitan region and caused extensive damage to homes, industry and infrastructure. The disaster prompted significant changes to Brisbane’s flood-mitigation planning, including the construction of the Wivenhoe Dam, completed in 1984 as a key component of the city’s future flood-control strategy.

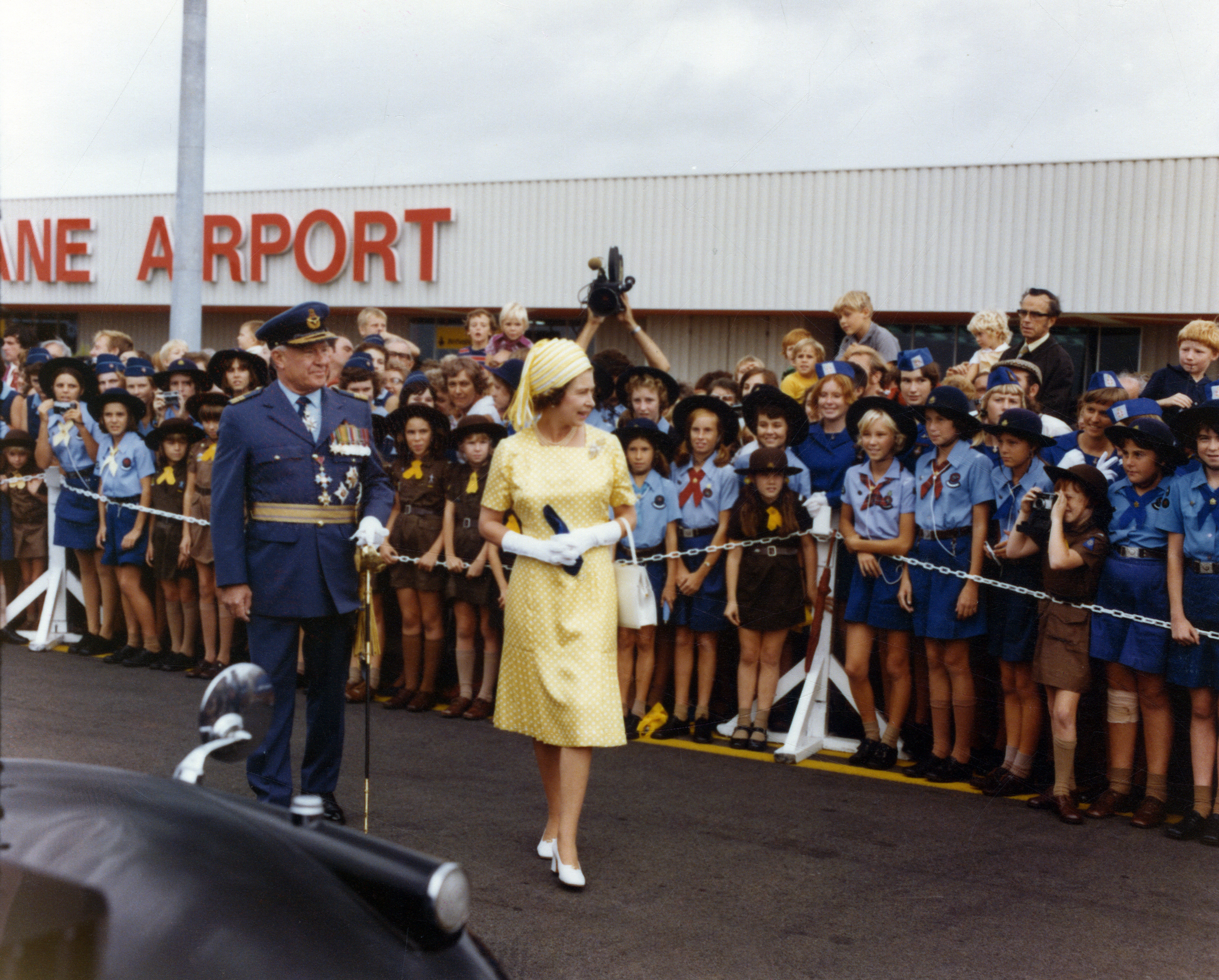
Queen Elizabeth II at Brisbane Airport, 1977

Brisbane’s restrictive political climate contributed to the emergence of an influential local counterculture. Bands such as The Saints produced some of the world’s earliest punk recordings, positioning Brisbane as a notable centre of early punk music.

Significant urban change accompanied these political developments. Brisbane’s long-running tram network, a defining feature of the city since the nineteenth century, closed in 1969 after the 1962 depot fire and a shift towards road-based transport priorities. The end of the tram era marked Brisbane’s transition to a predominantly motor-vehicle-oriented city and reshaped suburban development patterns for the remainder of the twentieth century. Major heritage buildings were controversially demolished, including the Bellevue Hotel in 1979 and Cloudland Ballroom in 1982, sparking sustained public debate about preservation and development.

At the same time, landmark cultural projects reshaped the riverfront. Construction of the Queensland Cultural Centre at South Brisbane, designed by architect Robin Gibson began in 1976, with the Queensland Art Gallery (1982), Queensland Performing Arts Centre (1985) and Queensland Museum (1986) forming a major new cultural precinct.

=== Reform and Renewal (1987–2000) ===
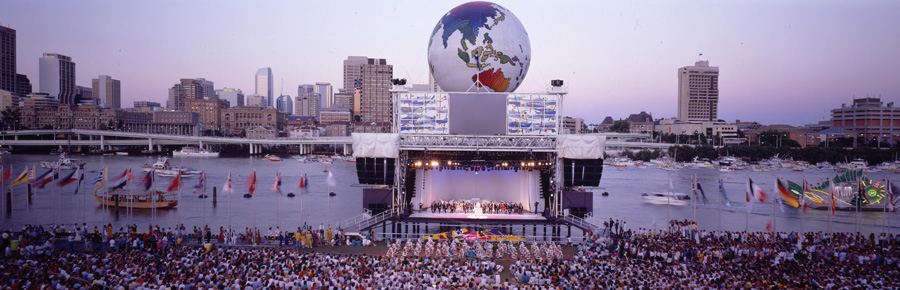
Crowds at World Expo 88, the international exposition that transformed Brisbane’s South Bank precinct

The late 1980s marked a decisive shift in Brisbane’s political culture. The Fitzgerald Inquiry (1987–1989) revealed systemic corruption within the Queensland government and police force, leading to the resignation of senior ministers, the dismissal of the Police Commissioner and the restructuring of key public institutions. The inquiry ended the National Party’s 32-year rule and reshaped governance across Queensland.

Simultaneously, Brisbane redefined its national and international identity. World Expo 88 transformed the derelict industrial waterfront at South Brisbane into a major cultural and recreational precinct, laying the foundations for the modern South Bank Parklands.

During the 1990s Brisbane’s economy diversified as older industrial districts declined and inner-city renewal gained pace. Large areas of Teneriffe, Newstead and New Farm underwent significant transformation, including the conversion of woolstores and warehouses into residential and mixed-use developments. The expansion of South Bank Parklands during the decade created one of the city’s key public spaces, while increasing environmental regulation, such as the banning of backyard incinerators in 1987 and closures of coal-fired power stations, contributed to marked improvements in air quality.

== 21st Century ==
=== Urban Growth and Cultural Expansion (2001–2019) ===
The early 2000s saw major expansion of Brisbane’s public transport network, beginning with the opening of the South East Busway in 2000, which became the backbone of the city’s bus rapid transit system. The decade was also marked by rapid population growth and significant cultural investment. The Queensland Cultural Centre expanded with the opening of the new State Library building and the Gallery of Modern Art (GOMA) in 2006, establishing Brisbane as an important centre for contemporary art in the Asia–Pacific region.

Major transport and infrastructure projects reshaped the inner city. The Inner City Bypass opened in 2002, while new pedestrian bridges—including the Goodwill Bridge (2001) and the Kurilpa Bridge (2009)—expanded Brisbane’s active-transport network. Major public-space initiatives such as the creation of the Roma Street Parklands (2001), the construction and later rebuilding of the Brisbane Riverwalk (2003; reconstructed after 2011), and the redevelopment of the Howard Smith Wharves precinct in the late 2010s further revitalised Brisbane’s riverfront.

The 2010–2011 Queensland floods had a profound impact on the metropolitan area, inundating thousands of properties, damaging transport infrastructure and prompting major reassessments of flood resilience and planning. Brisbane also experienced a destructive hailstorm in November 2014, which caused significant damage across the city.

Recovery and renewal coincided with increased international attention when Brisbane hosted the 2014 G20 Summit, an event that drove improvements to public spaces, transport corridors and security infrastructure. The city also hosted other major international events during this period, including the final Goodwill Games and the Rugby League World Cup finals in 2008 and 2017. Large-scale transport projects continued throughout the decade. The AirportlinkM7 tunnel opened in 2012, followed by the completion of the Legacy Way tunnel in 2015. In 2019, the completion of the Brisbane Skytower made it the tallest building in the city and one of the tallest skyscrapers in Australia.

=== A New Metropolitan Era (2020–present) ===
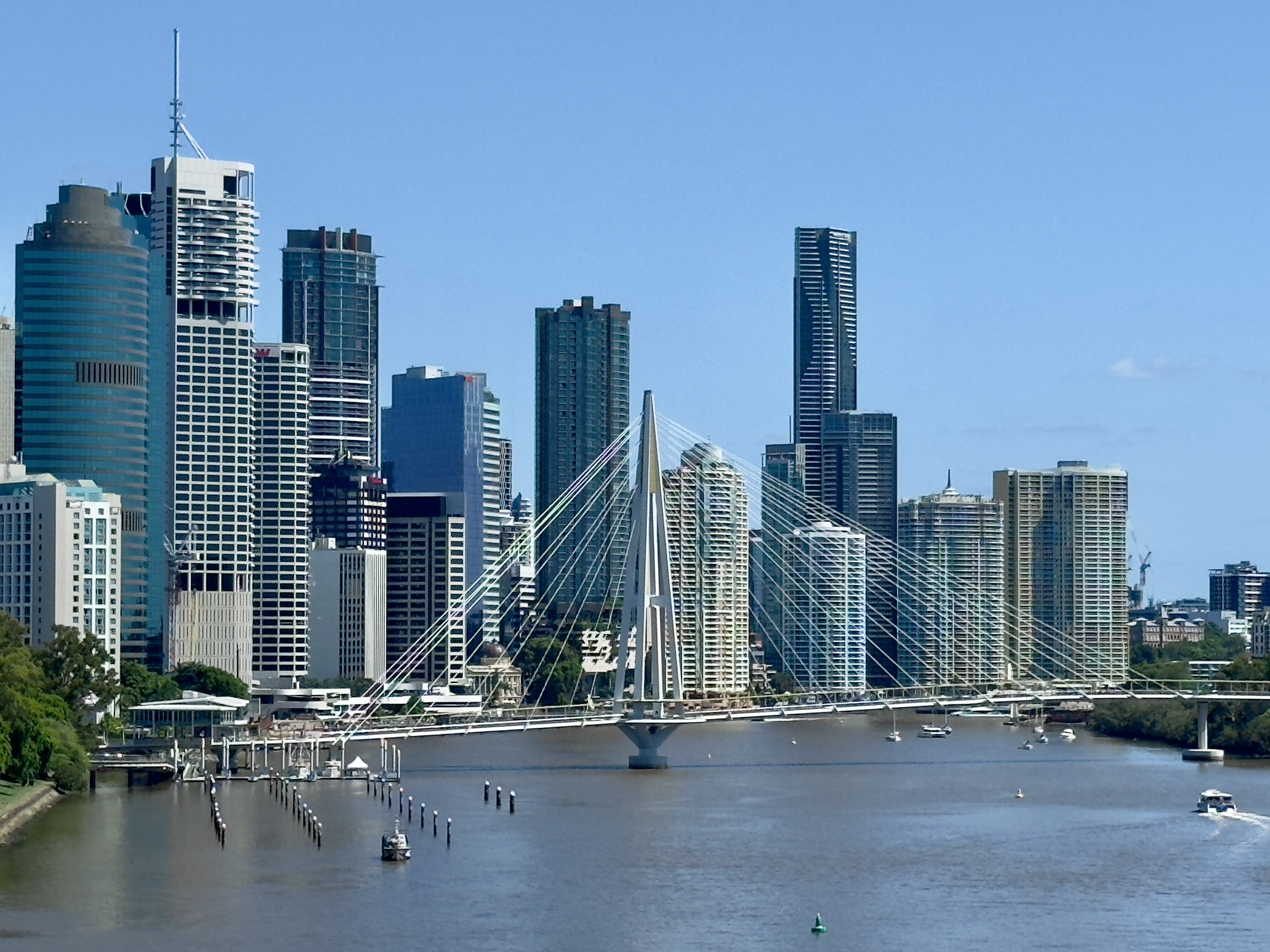
The Kangaroo Point Bridge opened in 2024 has a mast height of 95 meters making it the tallest bridge in the city.

The 2020s marked the beginning of a new phase in Brisbane’s development, characterised by large-scale infrastructure investment, widespread riverfront redevelopment and sustained population growth. Brisbane recorded the nation’s highest levels of interstate migration in the early 2020s, driving increased demand for housing, transport and public services. Brisbane, like much of Australia, experienced significant social and political impacts during the COVID-19 pandemic, including border closures, public health restrictions, mass vaccination campaigns and major waves of the Omicron variant in 2021–2022.

Major city-shaping projects included the Queen's Wharf redevelopment, the Cross River Rail project and the Brisbane Metro rapid-transit system. Riverfront renewal has continued through the revitalisation of the Howard Smith Wharves precinct and the construction of a network of new pedestrian and green bridges such as the Kangaroo Point Bridge.

Natural disasters have also shaped the decade. The 2022 eastern Australia floods caused severe inundation across Brisbane, exceeding local 2011 flood levels in several suburbs and prompting new flood-mitigation planning. Further prolonged rainfall and waterlogging affected the city in early 2025 during the impact of Cyclone Alfred.

A major milestone came in July 2021, when Brisbane was selected to host the 2032 Summer Olympic and Paralympic Games, initiating further long-term planning for venues, transport improvements and urban redevelopment.

== See also ==
- Timeline of Brisbane
- History of Queensland
- History of association football in Brisbane, Queensland
- History of electricity supply in Brisbane
