= Frederick Bedwell =

British Royal Navy officer (1796–1853)

Lieutenant Commander Frederick Bedwell (1796–1853) was a sailor in the Royal Navy. He participated in the Peninsular War, the American War of 1812, and was a member of the guard that took Napoleon I of France to banishment on Saint Helena. He was a Master's mate on the Mermaid under Phillip Parker King during King's explorations of Australia from 1818 to 1822.

== Sources ==
- O'Byrne, William Richard (1849). "Bedwell, Frederick" . A Naval Biographical Dictionary . John Murray – via Wikisource.
