= James Groom =

James Groom(e) may refer to:

- James Groom (convict)
- James Groom (politician), see 67th New York State Legislature
- James Groome, politician in Maryland, USA
