= King Expedition of 1817 =

First exploring and surveying expedition to Australia

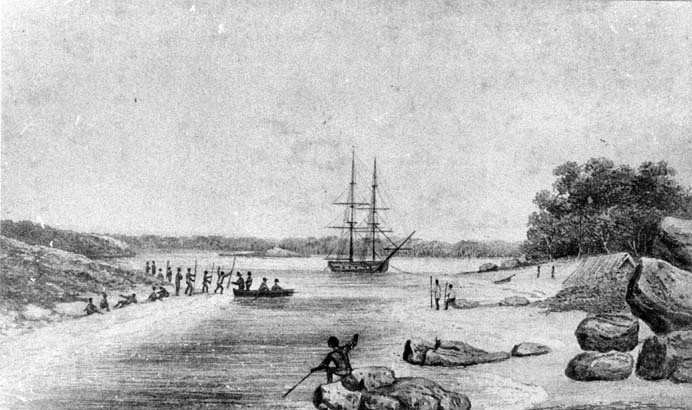
HMS Bathurst in Oyster Harbour in 1821

Phillip Parker King's first exploring and surveying expedition departed Sydney on 22 December 1817 on board the cutter HMS Mermaid. On board were King, his two master's mates Frederick Bedwell and John Septimus Roe, the botanist Allan Cunningham, 12 seamen, 2 boys and the native Bungaree. The purpose of the voyage was to explore and make a rough survey of the northern and north-west coasts of Australia.

From Port Jackson, Mermaid sailed south down the east coast, then west through Bass Strait and along the south coast. On 20 January 1818, King anchored in King George Sound, which had previously been visited by only two other British explorers, George Vancouver and Matthew Flinders. He then took Mermaid into Oyster Harbour, remaining there for nearly two weeks.

On 1 February, Mermaid left King George Sound, continuing west to Cape Leeuwin, then north up the west coast of Australia. Sickness amongst the crew left the boat badly undermanned, preventing King from examining much of the west coast. At North West Cape, they discovered and surveyed a gulf, named Exmouth Gulf after Lord Exmouth. They lost two of their three anchors while surveying the gulf, and this would greatly hamper their surveying from then on.

Continuing north-east along the coast, the Mermaid eventually passed the northernmost tip of Arnhem Land, reaching a point on Cobourg Peninsula that King named Port Essington. They then crossed to Timor for reprovisioning. After a stay of two weeks at Coepang, they returned to Sydney down the west coast and east along the south coast. King and a number of the crew became dangerously ill shortly after leaving Timor, this being attributed to the food they had eaten there. During the southern leg of the journey the boat encountered extremely rough weather, and on 24 July a crew member died from his illness. The Mermaid arrived back in Sydney on 29 July, having been absent for over 30 weeks.

On reviewing the voyage, King stated that he was largely satisfied with the results. The loss of two anchors had not been as crippling as anticipated, as a long period of fine weather had enabled them to continue their work with one remaining anchor.
