= HMS Mermaid (1817) =

Royal Navy cutter, in service 1817–1823

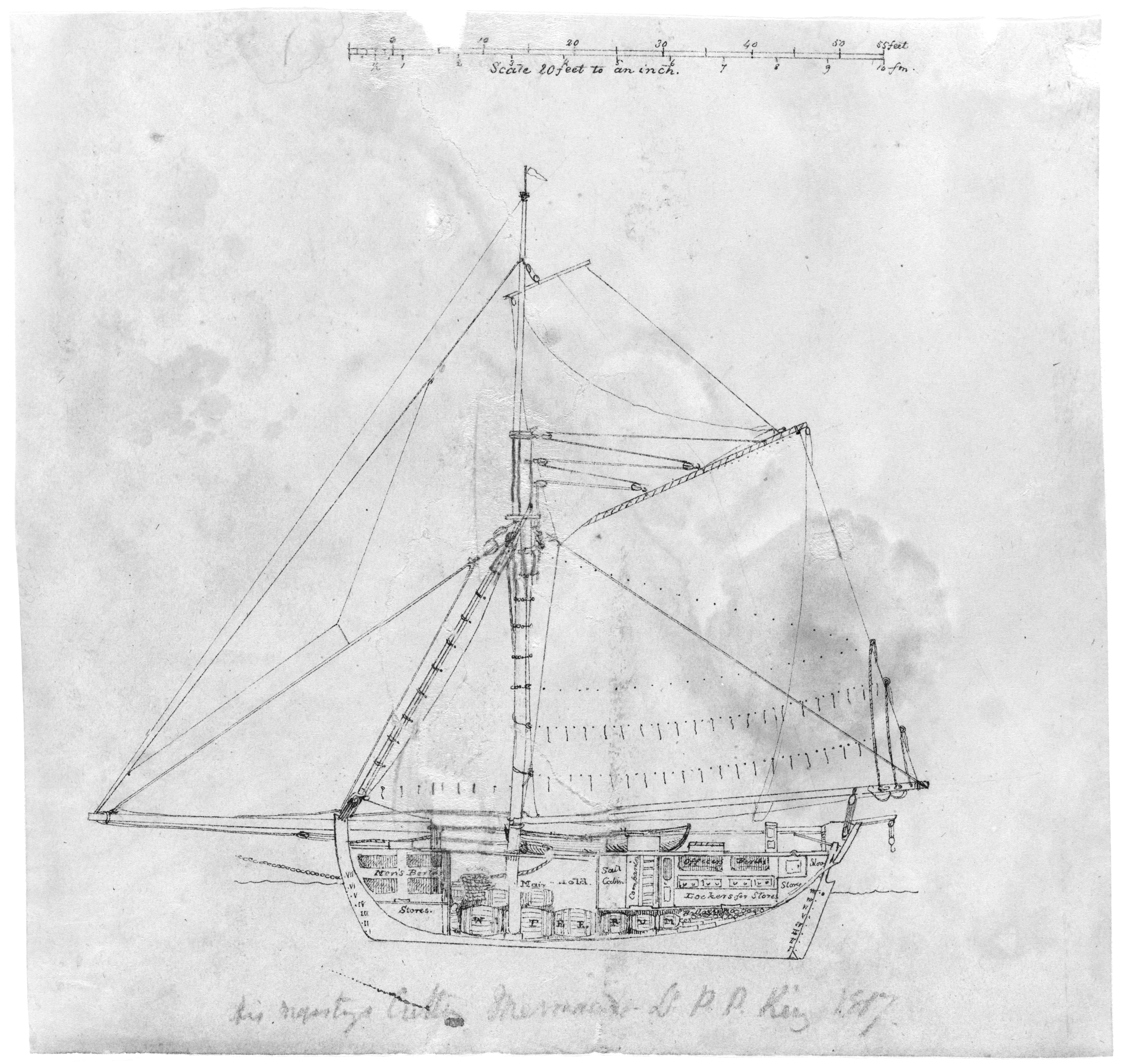
- The cutter Mermaid

History

United Kingdom
- Name: Mermaid
- Builder: Thompson, Howrah
- Launched: 1816
- Fate: Sold 1817

United Kingdom
- Name: HMS Mermaid
- Acquired: 1817 by purchase
- Commissioned: 16 October 1817
- Fate: Sold 1823

United Kingdom
- Name: Mermaid
- Owner: Government of New South Wales
- Acquired: 1823 by purchase
- Fate: Wrecked on 13 June 1829, Flora Reef, Queensland

General characteristics
- Tons burthen: 83, 84, or 85 (bm)
- Length: 56 ft (17 m)
- Beam: 18 ft 6 in (5.6 m)
- Draught: 8 ft 10 in (2.7 m)
- Sail plan: Originally: single masted cutter rigged; c. 1829: Two-masted schooner
- Notes: Teak-built

HMS Mermaid was a cutter built in Howrah, India, in 1816. The British Royal Navy purchased her at Port Jackson in 1817. The Navy then used her to survey the Australian coasts. In 1820 she grounded and in 1823 was condemned for survey work. The Navy sold her to the colonial government which used her to run errands until she was wrecked in 1829.

== Career ==
Mermaid was launched at Howrah in 1816 and the Royal Navy purchased her at Port Jackson in 1817.

Phillip Parker King used her between December 1817 and December 1820 to survey parts of the Australian coast that Matthew Flinders had not already surveyed. King circumnavigated the Australian mainland and conducted a survey of the Inner Route through the Great Barrier Reef.

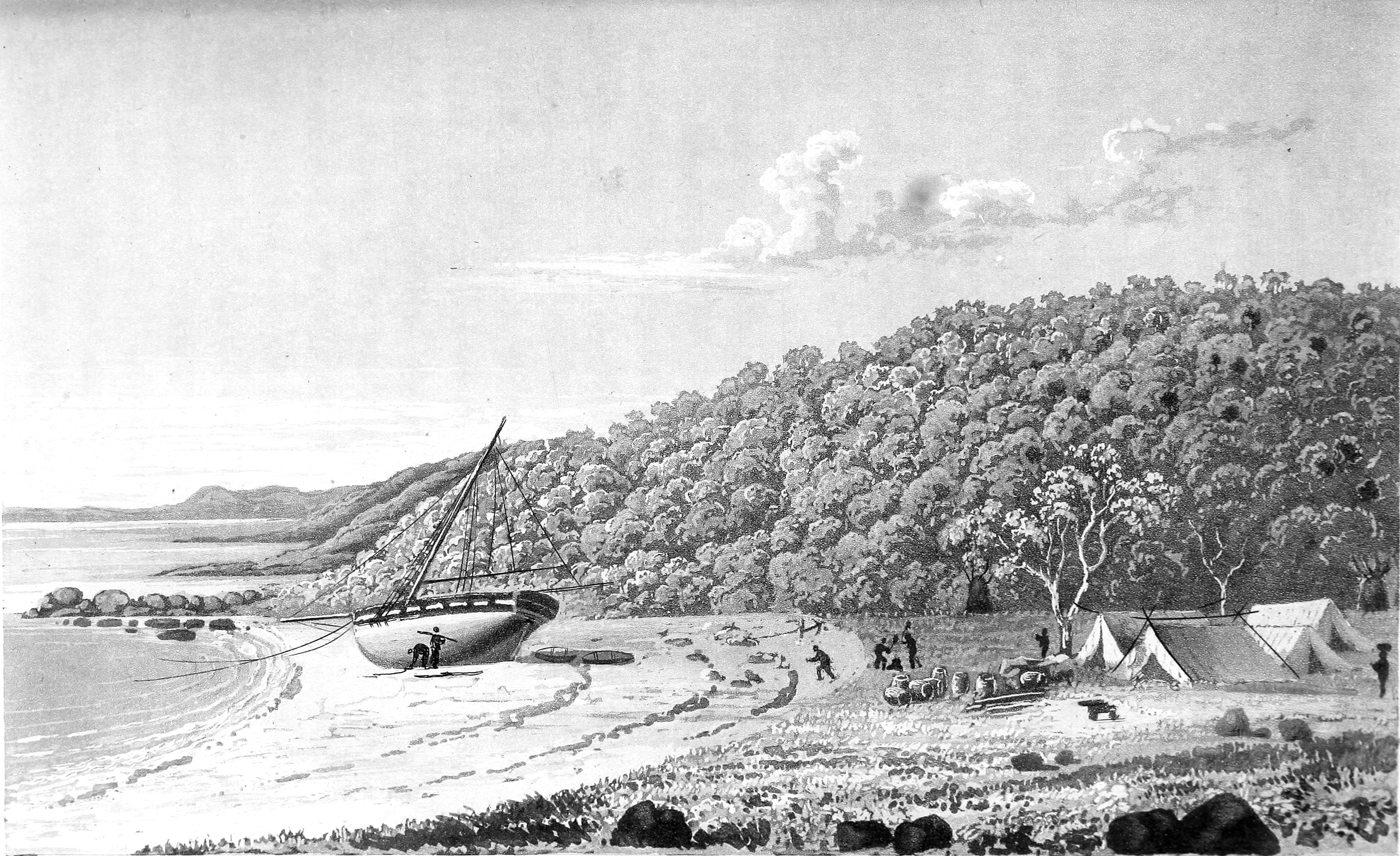
View of the encampment in Careening Bay where Mermaid was repaired in 1820

In 1820 Mermaid grounded at Careening Bay, Kimberley, Western Australia; gotten off, she only reached Sydney with difficulty. A survey resulted in her condemnation for survey work and her sale in 1823 to the colonial government.

In September 1823 Mermaid carried John Oxley as he explored the Queensland coast south of Port Curtis, discovering the Brisbane and Tweed rivers. At Moreton Bay he rescued Thomas Pamphlett and John Finnegan, who had been ship-wrecked earlier in the year. These events led to the establishment of Brisbane and the Separation of Queensland.

In September 1825 Mermaid transported Edmund Lockyer to Moreton Bay so he could explore the upper reaches of the Brisbane River.

In August 1826 John Richardson travelled on Mermaid from Fort Dundas, on Melville Island, to Timor to obtain seeds.

Around 1829 the ship was rigged as a two-masted schooner.

== Loss ==
Captain Samuel Nolbrow and Mermaid departed Sydney on 16 May 1829, bound for Port Raffles with government dispatches and provisions for King George's Sound. She proceeded on the inner passage to Torres Straits. At 6 a.m. on 13 June she struck an uncharted reef on the southern side of Flora Reef, Queensland. (Nolbrow gave the location as at 17°7′S 146°10′E.) She bilged and her crew abandoned her that evening with no loss of life.

== Post-script ==
An underwater archaeology team led by the Australian National Maritime Museum in early 2009 rediscovered the wreck.

== See also ==
- King Expedition of 1817
