= Phillip Parker King =

Australian explorer, politician and Rear Admiral of the Blue (1791–1856)

Rear-Admiral Phillip Parker King FRS
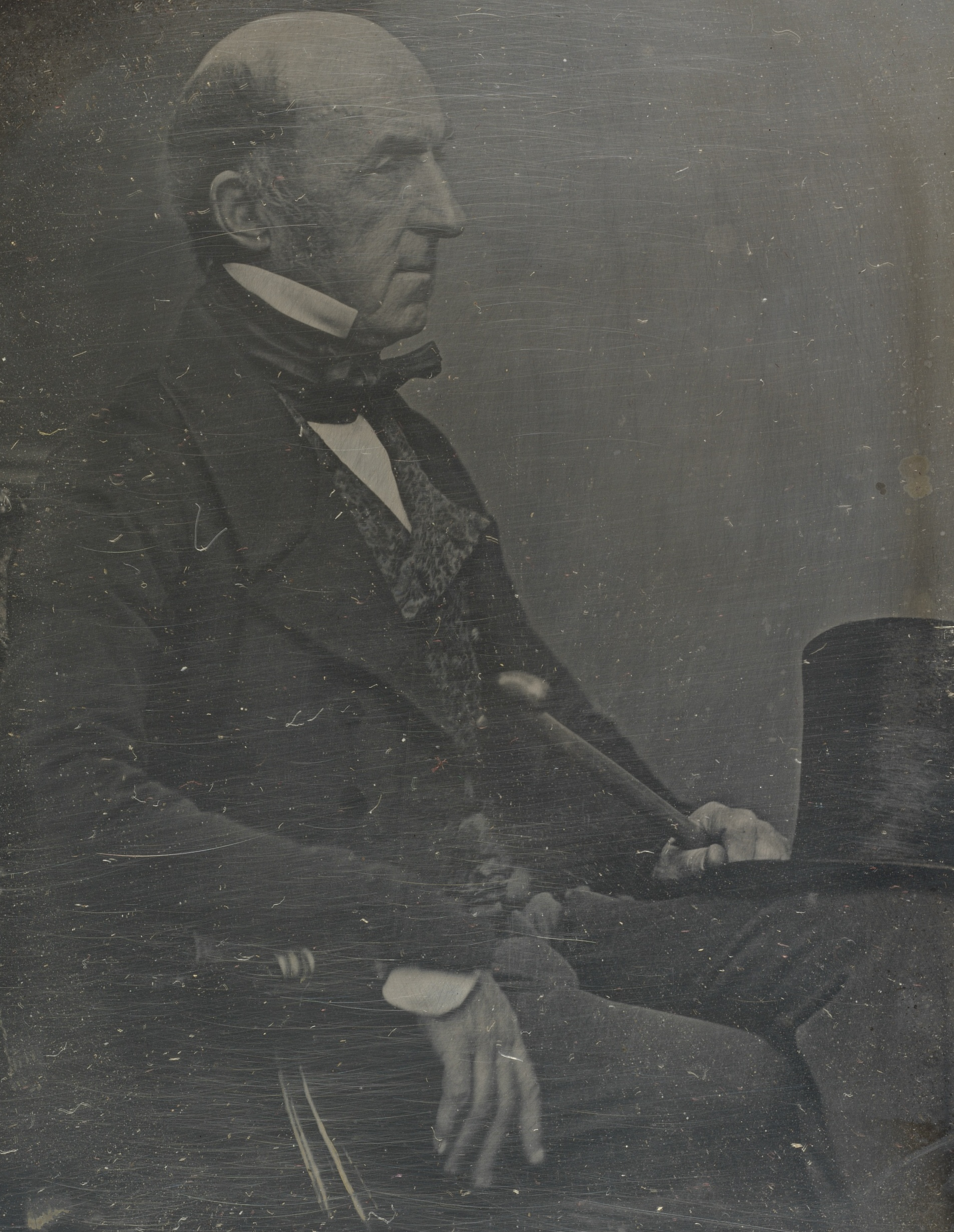
- Phillip Parker King, c. 1855
- Born: Phillip Parker King; 13 December 1791; Norfolk Island, Colony of New South Wales
- Died: 26 February 1856 (aged 64); North Sydney, Colony of New South Wales,
- Occupation: Naval Officer
- Known for: Exploration of the coastline of Australia
- Title: Rear-Admiral
- Parent(s): Philip Gidley King and Anna Josepha King

Phillip Parker King (13 December 1791 – 26 February 1856) was an early explorer of the Australian and Patagonian coasts.

== Early life and education ==
King was born on Norfolk Island, to Philip Gidley King and Anna Josepha King née Coombe, and named after his father's mentor, Admiral Arthur Phillip (1738–1814), first governor of New South Wales and founder of the British penal colony which later became the city of Sydney, which explains the difference in spelling of his and his father's first names. King was sent to England for education in 1796, and he joined the Royal Naval Academy, at Portsmouth, in county Hampshire, England in 1802. King entered the Royal Navy in 1807, where he was commissioned lieutenant in 1814.

== Expeditions in Australia ==
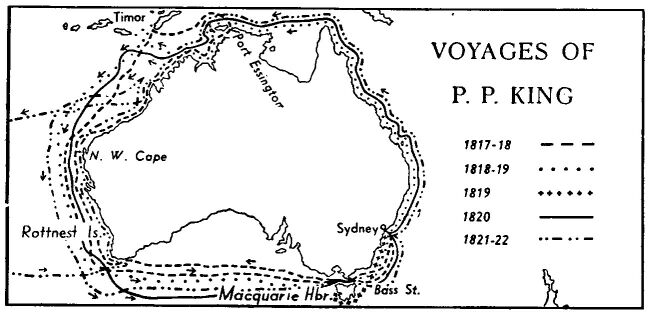
Voyages of King

King was assigned to survey the parts of the Australian coast not already examined by Royal Navy officer, Matthew Flinders, (who had already made three earlier exploratory voyages between 1791 and 1810, including the first circumnavigation of Australia) and made four voyages between December 1817 and April 1822. Amongst the 19-man crew were Allan Cunningham, a botanist, John Septimus Roe, later the first Surveyor-General of Western Australia, and the Aboriginal man Bungaree. The first three trips were in the 76-tonne cutter HMS Mermaid, but the vessel was grounded in 1829. The Admiralty had instructed King to discover whether there was any river "likely to lead to an interior navigation into this great continent". The Colonial Office had given instructions to collect information about topography, fauna, timber, minerals, climate, and the Indigenous peoples and the prospects of developing trade with them.

=== First voyage ===
From February to June 1818, the coast was surveyed as far as Van Diemen Gulf (between the Northern Territory and Timor) and there were many meetings with Aboriginal Australians and proas sailed by Makassans. In June the Mermaid visited Timor before returning to Sydney using the same route, arriving on 29 July.

=== Second voyage ===
In December 1818 and January 1819, King surveyed Macquarie Harbour in Van Diemen's Land (now Tasmania), sailing north in May 1819 for Torres Strait. King took John Oxley as far as the Hastings River on the Mid North Coast of New South Wales, and continued further up the coast to survey the coastline between Cape Wessel (Northern Territory) and Admiralty Gulf (Western Australia). King returned to Sydney on 12 January 1820.

=== Third voyage ===
On King's third voyage, Mermaid ran aground on the Queensland coast, but the crew did not realise how badly it had been damaged until they had rounded the tip of the Cape York Peninsula, sailed through the Torres Strait and across the northern coast as far as the Kimberley in Western Australia. When the ship was taking on water faster than it could be pumped out by the crew, King selected a spot 600 km (370 mi) north-east of present-day Broome, now known as Careening Bay, on Coronation Island, after he was forced to execute a manoeuvre known as careening, or deliberately grounding a ship so that it could be repaired. The crew did not meet any of the local Wunambal people while they were stranded there for 18 days doing the repairs, but they observed that the area was occupied, with Parker commenting in his journal on the dwellings that they observed. He described not only bark shelters on the beach, but more larger and more substantial buildings on top of the hill. He also observed the remnants of sago palm nuts, which were commonly eaten along the coast.

King was concerned at this point of the crew's vulnerability to the armed Makassan proas, as the Makassans harvested trepang (sea cucumbers) and traded along the northern Australian coast at that time, so he ordered the cannons to be mounted along the beach. They managed to repair the ship without incident and sailed away in early October 1820, but not before the ship's carpenter had been instructed to inscribe "Mermaid 1820" on an ancient boab tree, which still stands today.

=== Fourth voyage ===
King's fourth voyage was undertaken in the 154-tonne sloop HMS Bathurst. The ship headed north, through Torres Strait and to the north-west coast of the continent, including the Dampier Archipelago. Further survey of the west coast was made after a visit to Mauritius.

== Expeditions to South America ==
King had been promoted to commander in July 1821, and in April 1823 returned to England. He subsequently commanded the survey vessel HMS Adventure, and in company with HMS Beagle, spent five years surveying the complex convoluted coasts around the Strait of Magellan (1826–1830) at the southern tip of South America. At the same time, King put together a unique collection of Patagonian objects from local tribes living in Tierra del Fuego, which was later donated to the British Museum in London. In addition to written records, King also lent his hand to drawing and watercolour painting for illustrations, some of which were later used to illustrate his accounts. The result was presented at a meeting of the Royal Geographical Society in 1831. His eldest son, also named Philip Gidley King, accompanied his father and continued as a midshipman on HMS Beagle (1832–1836) on the continuing survey of Patagonia under Robert FitzRoy, in the company of noted scientist Charles Darwin (1809–1882). King owned a property at Dunheved in the western suburbs of Sydney where he entertained Charles Darwin on Darwin's last night in Sydney in January 1836.

== Later life ==
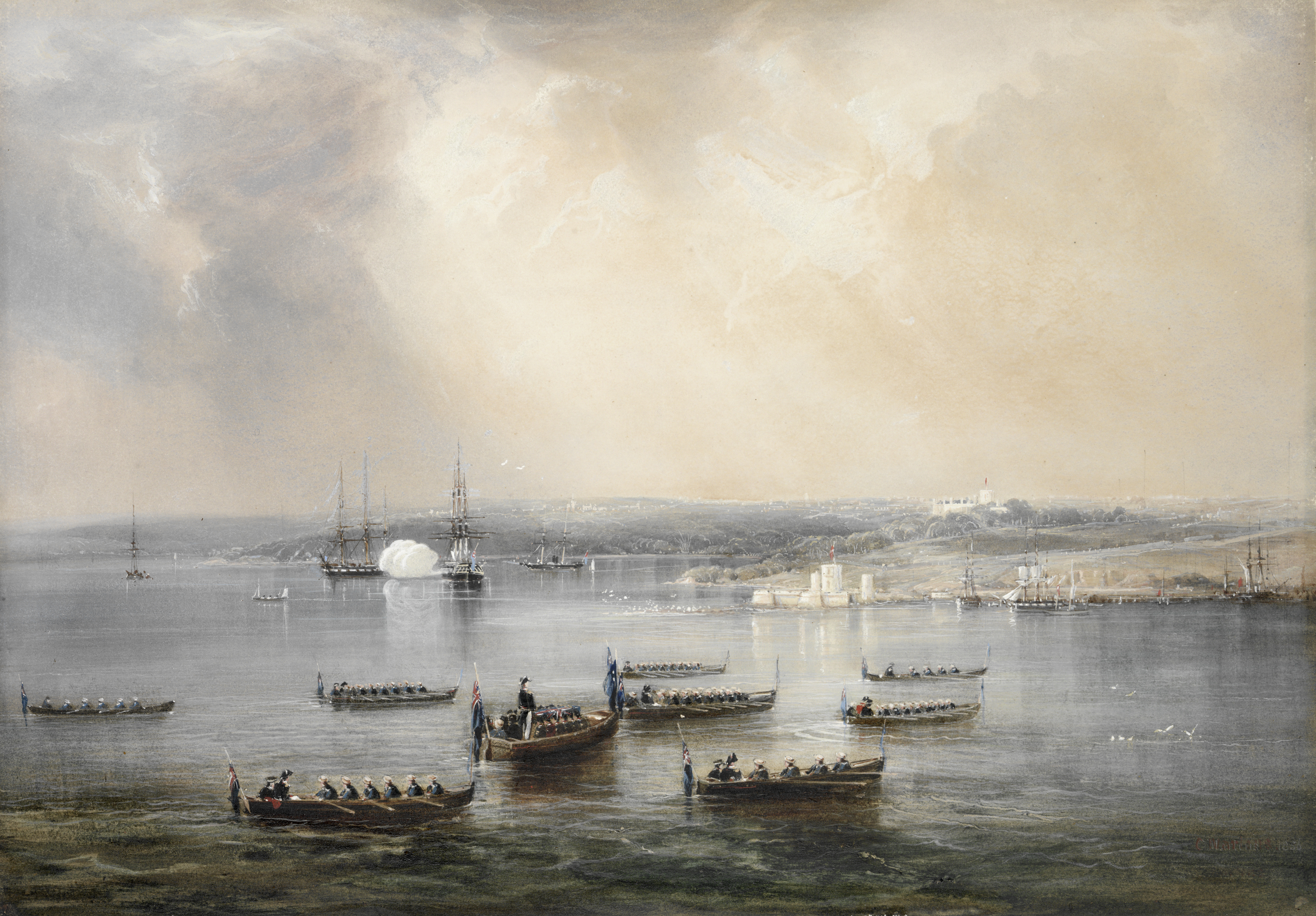
The funeral of Rear Admiral Phillip Parker King, 1856, painted by Conrad Martens

King was appointed to the first New South Wales Legislative Council in 1829, however he was absent from the colony and did not take his seat, and was replaced by John Campbell. When King returned to the colony in 1832 he pressed for his reappointment to the council, however he was not re-appointed until February 1839. In April the same year King was appointed resident commissioner of the Australian Agricultural Company, a position he held for ten years. King offered to resign from the council on accepting this appointment, but his resignation was not accepted until October. King was again appointed to the Legislative Council in 1850, and was elected as the member for the Counties of Gloucester and Macquarie in 1851.

In 1855 King was promoted to Rear admiral of the Blue on the retired list, becoming the first Australian-born flag officer in the (Royal Navy). King was a Fellow of the Royal Society.

King died on 26 February 1856 at North Sydney.

== Family ==
King married Harriet Lethbridge in 1817 prior to sailing to New South Wales. Harriet died at Ashfield, Sydney, on 19 December 1874. Together they had eight children including :

- Philip Gidley (1817–1904) stock manager of the Australian Agricultural Co & later a member of the Legislative Council.
- John (1820–1895)
- (William) Essington (1821–1910)
- Rev. Robert Lethbridge King (1823–1897) was principal of Moore Theological College in 1868–78.
- (Charles) Macarthur (1824–1903)
- Frederick (1825–1895),
- Arthur Septimus (1827–1899)

== Legacy ==
King and his crew made valuable contributions had to the exploration and mapping of Australia, particularly the northern and western coasts. Because he and his crew were prepared to risk the danger of going in close to the shoreline, they were able to complete the valuable work of charting the entire coastline of Australia.

=== Recognition ===
King was honoured on the £2 postage stamp of Australia in 1964, and the $4 of 1966.(The Australian pound was replaced by the decimal Australian dollar in 1966.)

The Australian native orchid Dendrobium kingianum was named after him.

King Sound in the Kimberley region was named after him.

John Oxley named the waterway Kings River on 4 October 1818 after King. The name was changed from Kings Creek to King Creek at the request of residents and council on 19 January 2007.

Six species of reptiles are named in his honour: Amphisbaena kingii, Chlamydosaurus kingii, Egernia kingii, Elgaria kingii, Hydrophis kingii, and Liolaemus kingii. Chlamydosaurus kingii, the frill-neck lizard, was first collected by the botanist Cunningham at Careening Cove on the third journey in 1820 (see above). New Zealand botanist and missionary William Colenso named the New Zealand emdemic plant species Coriaria kingiana after King.

== Works ==
- King, Phillip Parker (1827), Narrative of a Survey of the intertropical and western Coasts of Australia : performed between the years 1818 and 1822, London: John Murray
- Extracts from a letter addressed by Capt. Philip Parker King, R.N., F.R.S. and L.S., to N.A. Vigors, Esq., on the animals of the Straits of Magellan. Zoological Journal London 3:422-32. 1828.
- Notes on birds collected by Capt. King in Chile.Proceedings of the Committee of Science and Correspondence of the Zoological Society of London, 1831: 29–30.1831
- King, Phillip Parker (1832), Sailing Directions to the Coasts of Eastern and Western Patagonia, and the Straits of Magellan and the Sea-Coast of Tierra del Fuego, London: Hydrographical Office, Admiralty
- King, P.P. and Broderip, W.J. Description of Cirrhipedia, Conchifera and Mollusca, in a collection formed by the officers of H.M.S. Adventure and Beagle employed between the years 1826 and 1830 in surveying the southern coasts of South America, including the Straits of Magalhaens and the coast of Tierra del Fuego. The Zoological Journal, 5: 332–349.1832
- King, P. P. (1839), FitzRoy, Robert (ed.), Narrative of the surveying voyages of His Majesty's Ships Adventure and Beagle between the years 1826 and 1836, describing their examination of the southern shores of South America, and the Beagle's circumnavigation of the globe. Proceedings of the first expedition, 1826–30, under the command of Captain P. Parker King, R.N., F.R.S., vol. I, London: Henry Colburn.

== See also ==
- King expedition of 1817
- European and American voyages of scientific exploration

== Notes ==
New South Wales Legislative Council
| New title Counties of Gloucester, Macquarie, and Stanley divided into 3 | Member for Counties of Gloucester & Macquarie; 1851 – 1856 | Council replaced by new parliament |
