= John Thompson (convict) =

John Thompson, a convict of the colony of New South Wales (now Australia), was one of four men who set off on a timber getting mission from Sydney bound for Illawarra in 1823. The men were caught in a severe storm and driven north 728 km to Moreton Island of the coast of Brisbane, becoming the first Europeans to live in the area and the first to discover the Brisbane River.

Prior to this a number of earlier explorers had sailed the Moreton Bay area. Most notable was Matthew Flinders who spent 15 days in the general vicinity during his 1799 expedition from Port Jackson to Hervey Bay. Due to the difficulty of finding coastal rivers by seaward exploration, none of these explorers became aware of the existence of the Brisbane River.

Later in 1823, when the Surveyor General, John Oxley, was commissioned by Governor Brisbane to find sites for further penal settlements, he made a trip to the Moreton Bay area. If not for a chance meeting with one of Thompson's surviving partners, Thomas Pamphlett, and the men telling him of a large freshwater river they had stumbled across some months earlier, Oxley may never have made the exploration that lead to the establishment of Brisbane Town some years later.

== The 'Timbergetting' Voyage ==
The four men—Thomas Pamphlett, John Finnegan, Richard Parsons and Thompson himself, left Sydney on 21 March 1823 bound for the ‘Five Islands’ (Illawarra). They had been hired to fetch cedar wood. Shortly after their departure, a fierce storm blew them out to sea, and they went 21 days without water. During this time, Thompson died and was buried at sea a few days later, as his friends were unable to put their boat ashore. The three survivors were beached on Moreton Island on 16 April 1823 and befriended the local Indigenous people.
