= Red Flag riots =

- Location: Brisbane, Australia
- Date: 24 March 1919
- Attack type: Riot
- Weapons: bayonets, rifles
- Deaths: 1 police horse
- Injuries: 14–19 police officers, and 100 rioters (19 who required hospitalisation)
- No. of participants: ~7–8,000
- Defender: 40–60 Queensland Police mounted on horseback

The Red Flag riots were a series of violent demonstrations and attacks that occurred in Brisbane, Australia over the course of 1918–19. The attacks were largely undertaken by returned soldiers from the First Australian Imperial Force (AIF) and were focused upon socialists and other elements of society that the ex-servicemen considered to be disloyal. The name was coined because of the flags that a number of the demonstrators carried, which were associated with the trade union movement and which were banned under the War Precautions Act. The most notable incident occurred on 24 March 1919, when a crowd of about 8,000 ex-servicemen clashed with police who were preventing them from attacking the Russian Hall in Merivale Street, South Brisbane.

== Background ==
The Red Flag riots occurred as a result of a number of changes within Australian society at the time. By 1918 there had been a growing anti-war and trade union movement. Additionally, as a result of the 1917 Russian revolution and the subsequent Brest–Litovsk Treaty in March 1918, there was a climate of mistrust and fear within mainstream Australia towards the Russian community and a concern that certain elements might attempt to institute a similar type of revolution in Australia. These fears were compounded by increased industrial action and an almost xenophobic fear of non Anglo-Australians, which was in part due to the tensions caused by the war, but also partly due to the prevailing national psyche at the time. As a result of these fears, and concerns within the government about the effect of the trade union movement upon wartime production, the War Precautions Act had increasingly been used to settle labour disputes and although in some cases it could be seen that this was necessary to maintain wartime production, there were others that saw it as an attempt to suppress the trade unions.

For some, this feeling was confirmed when in September 1918 the War Precautions Act was extended to prohibit the flying of red flags, considered a symbol of the trade union movement, but also associated with Bolshevism. By November the war had ended, but the War Precautions Act remained in effect. The unemployment rate in Brisbane was more than 14% and many returning servicemen were unable to secure employment. Amidst growing unrest among Russian emigres, trade unionists and other socialist elements, concerns about political and social agitation amongst conservative elements of society grew. These concerns existed across Australia, but it was in Queensland, where there was a sizeable Russian population, that the concerns were largely focused. The situation seemed to worsen throughout November and December 1918 as a number of socialist demonstrations were held. In November, Peter Simonoff, who was seen as one of the main agitators, was arrested in Melbourne, having previously been banned from public speaking in Queensland in September. Following Simonoff's sentencing, in January 1919 a demonstration against the continued operation of the War Precautions Act was carried out at William Street, and was attended by over a thousand people singing socialist songs and carrying red banners.

To conservative elements this protest seemed to flout the law and as a result the government found itself under increasing pressure to do something about the situation. Private groups of concerned citizens began to form also, many of them formed from returned servicemen, from organisations such as the Returned Soldiers and Citizens Political Federation and the Returned Sailors and Soldiers Imperial League of Australia (RSSILA). As the tension mounted, another demonstration was planned for March.

== Merivale Street incident ==
On the afternoon of 23 March 1919 the second demonstration against the War Precautions Act was carried out, this time by about 400 people who marched from Trades Hall to the Domain. In order to obtain a permit for the march, the organisers had given the police their assurance that red flags would not be carried, and as such, not anticipating any trouble, the police presence was initially limited to only eight officers. However, the tensions that had been building since Simonoff's jailing boiled over and three large red flags were subsequently unfurled, along with over one hundred smaller banners, ribbons and handkerchiefs. As the demonstration proceeded mounted police unsuccessfully attempted to stop it as it approached Edward Street, however, the crowd overwhelmed the small number of police and managed to reach the Domain. Here a second attempt at stopping the demonstration was made by locking the gates of the Domain, however, sensing the angry mood of the crowd, the police decided to open the gates.

Upon entering the Domain the crowd swelled to about 1,000 people and a series of speakers began to talk about various topics including civil rights, revolution and militarism. The demonstration angered a number of ex-servicemen and several minor scuffles had ensued. Afterwards a large group of soldiers (some of whom were in uniform) broke up a meeting of socialists at North Quay that evening before moving off towards the Russian Hall in Merivale Street, South Brisbane. The Russian Hall was the base of the Russian Workers Association and as the ex-servicemen approached, the occupants fired a number of shots from the building before the police arrived, dispersing the crowd.

The following night, 24 March, a crowd of between 7,000–8,000 men assembled in North Quay, and into Queen and William Street, where speakers began talking about taking the law into their own hands. As the anger amongst the crowd grew, a large group broke away from it and carrying a large Australian flag proceeded to cross Victoria Bridge singing patriotic songs. Assembling at Merivale Street they began to move towards the hall. Finding their way blocked by a force of between 40 and 60 police mounted on horseback and armed with rifles and bayonets, under the command of the police commissioner, Frederic Urquhart, a clash broke out in which over 100 men received bayonet wounds. The fighting lasted for two hours. In the end between 14 and 19 police officers were injured and three police horses were shot, one of which later died, while 19 of the injured ex-servicemen needed to be evacuated by ambulance.

The next evening a crowd of a few thousand gathered at Albert Square, from where they marched to the offices of the Daily Standard. Police were needed to protect the building.

== Aftermath ==
One of the main political outcomes of the riot was the rise in popularity of the RSSILA which later became the RSL.

== See also ==
- Battle of Brisbane
- History of Brisbane
- Red Scare
