= Great fire of Brisbane =

1864 conflagration in Brisbane

Coordinates: 27.47047°S 153.02503°E

Great Fire of Brisbane
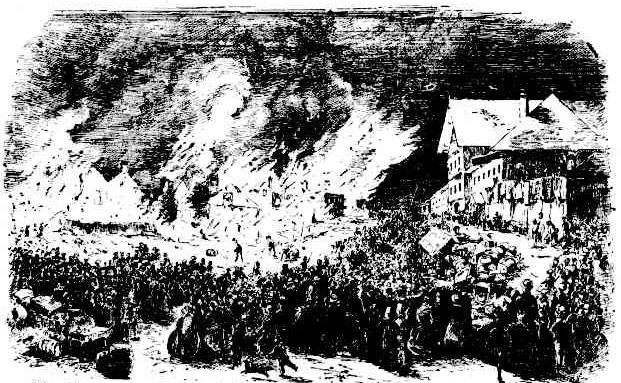
- A drawing depicting the scene at 11.30 pm on the night of 1 December 1864
- Date: 1 December 1864
- Location: Brisbane
- Outcome: 50–100 structures destroyed, 4 injured

The Great fire of Brisbane was a major conflagration that swept through the central parts of Brisbane in the Colony of Queensland (now a state of Australia) on 1 December 1864. For two and a half hours the fire burned out of control in large parts of Brisbane's central business district with entire blocks being destroyed, mainly in Queen, Albert, George, and Elizabeth Streets. It consumed 50 houses, 2 banks, 3 hotels, 4 draperies, and many other businesses as well as a "considerable amount of small houses". Considering the extent of the fire, casualties were very few; there was no loss of life, and four people were taken to hospital with injuries.

== Background ==
Two fires occurred in Brisbane in the same year before the Great Fire of Brisbane, the first occurred on 11 April 1864 in Queen Street where 14 buildings were burnt out. The second occurred only a few months before the Great Fire of Brisbane. The fire broke out around 1:00 am on 5 September 1864, the Volunteer Fire Brigade was quick to respond and extinguished the blaze within an hour. A total of fourteen buildings were destroyed in this fire. These fires were able to spread easily due to the abundance of buildings made from timber, and the limited supply of water to subdue the fires. After the April fire, an unknown Brisbane resident urged the Brisbane Town Council to invest in a proper fire brigade, however this warning was apparently ignored.

Sir, - What would the nations of the earth think if they knew that in the chief city of the colony of Queensland there is not a properly organised Fire Brigade, neither paid nor voluntary. There is a fire engine certainly, such as it is, but it is a miserable affair, compared with those made in America, though I have no doubt it has cost as much money. The great fire this morning tells a tale which should not be disregarded; some fine buildings have been thoroughly burnt down, to say nothing of the contents, most likely of far more value. Will not the government and the city council bestir themselves, so that this city shall be placed in comparative safety from fire?

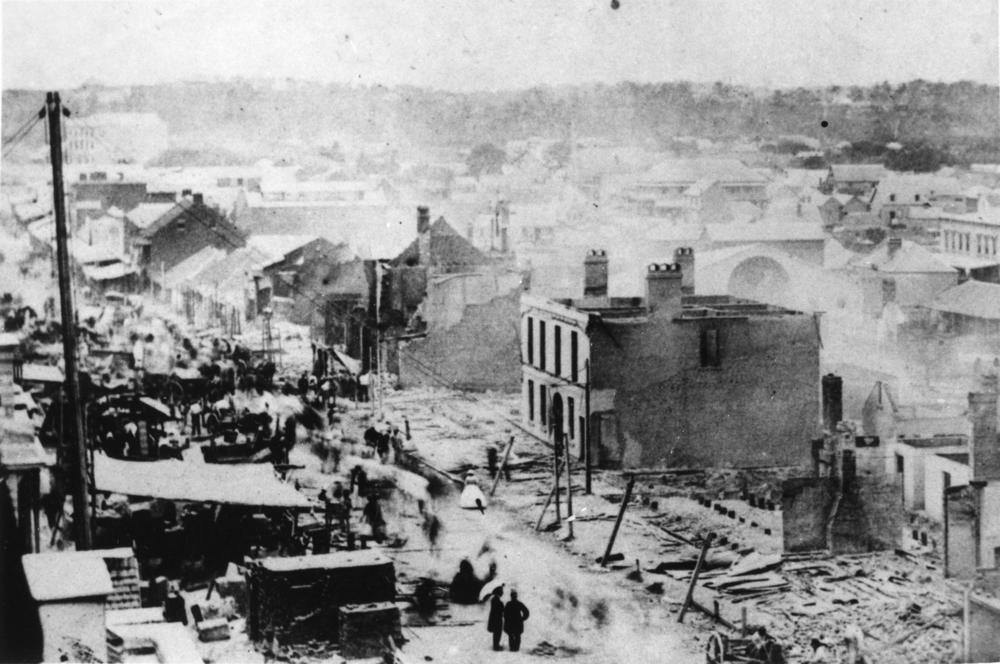
Aftermath of the Great Fire of Brisbane - Queen Street

== The Blaze ==
The fire started in the cellar underneath Stewart and Hemmant's drapery on the corner of Queen Street and Albert Street at around 7:40pm. News was conveyed to the police station, where the fire bell rang in alarm, and soon the entire available force was assembled and quickly despatched to the fires location. The doors of the building were broken in, but by this time the interior was 'one vast sheet of flame', with none of its contents salvageable. A crowd of hundreds gathered at the fiery scene, amongst whom was the Governor George Bowen, accompanied by Captain Carnegie. The Stewart and Hemmant's store could not be saved, so the volunteers-among whom the members of the Fire Brigade No. 1, and their Superintendent, Mr. Edmund Macdonnell, directed their attention to salvaging property in the nearest buildings, which included Gaujard's tobacco divan, and the businesses further up along Queen street. Amongst the volunteers were the Police Magistrate, and nearly the whole of the unpaid Justices, and the Bishops Tufnell and Quinn, who were also assisted by a large number of clergymen. A great deal of valuable stock of tobacco and cigars was saved, with soldiers guarding the property. Further up, a number of men headed by Mr. Cutbush got onto the roofs of two small shops, and attempted to pull the structures down. However, due to the heavy use of wood in the town's architecture, the fire progressed rapidly. Two of the men had been caught by the fire on the roof of Williams' Oyster Salon, and stayed on the burning building until it collapsed and they fell into the flames beneath, where they were quickly rescued although Mr. Cutbush was severely injured in the fall. At 8:30pm the fire slowed to a temporary lull due to some of the brick and stone buildings in the fires path, and another attempt was made to save the more valuable properties further up the street. Volunteers began demolishing the Café De Paris, however the extreme heat forced them to retreat. By 9:00pm, the north-westerly wind began spreading the fire down Albert Street and onto Elizabeth Street, however the damage along there was less severe as the buildings were spaced further apart, but in the laneway connected to Albert street running parallel to Queen Street was home to a large number of poor people with small wooden houses, all of which were destroyed. The volunteers emptied the Union Bank's vault of books, securities, and bullion before it too burnt down, while the valuables in Palmer's drapery, Lade's saddlery, and Messrs were saved. Meanwhile, on the opposite side of Queen Street, storekeepers used wet blankets to effectively halt the spread of fire coming over in that direction. By 11:30pm, the last building along Queen street was destroyed, the Bank of New South Wales, and the flames were halted in George street where the house of Mr. Pillow was demolished, thereby saving the stone building, the Registrar-Generals Office. The new building under construction on the corner of George and Queen streets was also saved, as the contractor had removed all wood from the site. Altogether 50 houses, and many businesses were destroyed, alongside a large number of 'small houses' in the laneways off Albert street. Within just a few hours the main centre of the town had been turned to ruin, with the total cost of the fire valued at £60,000.

== Aftermath ==
Following the fire, the rebuilding used more stone and brick.

However, it was not until 1881 that a Brisbane Fire Brigade Board was established. Its first commander, John Edward Hinton, was appointed in 1882, but it was not until 1889 that the first full-time fireman was appointed.
