= John Finnegan (explorer) =

John Finnegan, a convict of the colony of New South Wales (now Australia), was one of four men who set off on a timber getting mission from Sydney bound for Illawarra in 1823. The men were caught in a severe storm and driven north 728 km to Moreton Island off the coast of Brisbane, becoming the first Europeans to live in the area and the first to discover the Brisbane River.

Prior to this a number of earlier explorers had sailed the Moreton Bay area. Most notable was Matthew Flinders who spent 15 days in the general vicinity during his 1799 expedition from Port Jackson to Hervey Bay. Due to the difficulty of finding coastal rivers by seaward exploration, none of these explorers became aware of the existence of the Brisbane River. Later in 1823, when the Surveyor General, John Oxley, was commissioned by Governor Brisbane to find sites for further penal settlements, he made a trip to the Moreton Bay area. If not for a chance meeting with one of Finnegan’s surviving partners, Thomas Pamphlett, and the men telling him of a large freshwater river they had stumbled across some months earlier, Oxley may never have made the exploration that led to the establishment of Brisbane Town some years later.

== The 'Timbergetting' Voyage ==
The four men, Thomas Pamphlett, Richard Parsons, John Thompson and Finnegan himself, left Sydney on 21 March 1823 bound for the ‘Five Islands’ (Illawarra). They had been hired to fetch cedar wood. Shortly after they departed a fierce storm blew them out to sea and they were forced to go 21 days without water. During this time Thompson died and was buried at sea a few days later, his friends not being able to put their boat ashore. The three survivors were beached on Moreton Island on 16 April 1823 and made friends with the local Aborigines.

Assuming themselves to be somewhere south of Jervis Bay, the explorers determined to get back to Sydney. The natives took them by boat across the passage to Stradbroke Island where they spent approximately six weeks with the Noonucal tribe before heading across to the mainland, pulling in somewhere around the Cleveland area. They then began to travel north in hope of reaching civilisation. It wasn't long before the trio stumbled across a large river which they were unable to cross. They trekked upstream for almost a month, weakened due to lack of good food and hardly able to swim many of the creeks they encountered en route. Upon reaching Oxley Creek, however, they procured a canoe and attempted their first crossing of the river.

== Found ==
It was later in the year when John Oxley made his entrance into Moreton Bay. An extract from his diary on 19 November 1823 describes his unexpected meeting with Pamphlett:

"We rounded the Point Skirmish about 5 o'clock and observed a number of natives running along the beach towards the vessel, the foremost much lighter in colour than the rest. We were to the last degree astonished when he came abreast the vessel to hear him hail us in good English."

At the time of the meeting Finnegan was away on a hunting trip and Parsons had continued north in search of Sydney, an endeavour the other two men had decided to abandon, choosing rather to return to the Bribie Island area to live with the natives. When Finnegan returned the two men related to Oxley their discovery of the large river. Oxley was determined to explore it and, taking Finnegan with them as their guide, he and Stirling set off on 1 December 1823, entering the river the following day.
