= Richard Parsons (convict) =

Richard Parsons, a sawyer and convict of the colony of New South Wales (now Australia), was one of four free or ticket-of-leave men and the half proprietor of a boat who set off on a timber getting mission from Sydney bound for Illawarra in 1823. The men were caught in a severe storm and driven north 728 km seeing their boat smashed at the northern end of Moreton Island off the coast of Brisbane. He was probably the first Euoropean to both live in the area and discover the Brisbane River.

Prior to this, a number of earlier explorers had sailed the Moreton Bay area. Most notable was Matthew Flinders who spent 15 days in the general vicinity during his 1799 expedition from Port Jackson to Hervey Bay. Due to the difficulty of finding coastal rivers by seaward exploration, none of these explorers became aware of the existence of the Brisbane River. Later in 1823, when the Surveyor General, John Oxley, was commissioned by Governor Brisbane to find sites for further penal settlements, he made a trip to the Moreton Bay area. If it was not for a chance meeting with one of Parson's surviving partners, Thomas Pamphlett, and the men telling him of a large freshwater river they had stumbled across some months earlier, Oxley may never have made the exploration that lead to the establishment of Brisbane Town some years later.

By the time of Oxley pulled into Moreton Bay, Parsons was gone. Mistakenly believing that they were somewhere south of Sydney he had set of north on foot. His two companions began to travel with him but, upon reaching the Mooloolah River, Pamphlett decided to return to live with the Moreton Bay natives they had befriended earlier. Later John Finnegan also returned, having quarrelled with Parsons upon reaching the Noosa River. Parsons went on, he believed as far as 'four of five hundred miles'. Most believe this distance to be much exaggerated but he may well have gone as far as present day Central Queensland before he, as he later said, 'began to suspect his error by the extreme heat he felt, as he advanced.'

Parsons eventually returned to Bribie Island from where he was picked up by Oxley on 11 September 1824 and he finally came back to Sydney on 15 October alongside John Oxley's party on board the Government brig Amity. A brief account of his story was subsequently printed in The Australian.
