= Thomas Pamphlett =

- Born: c. 1788; England
- Died: 1838; Penrith, New South Wales, Australia
- Other names: James Groom
- Occupations: Brickmaker; cedar fetcher

Thomas Pamphlett (1788?–1838), sometimes Pamphlet, also known as James Groom, was a convict in colonial Australia. He is best known for his time as a castaway in the Moreton Bay area, halfway up the eastern coast of Australia, in 1823. He was marooned with two others, Richard Parsons and John Finnegan, until rescued by explorer John Oxley on HMS Mermaid on 29 November of that year. They were the first white people to live in the area.

They led Oxley to a large river, later named the Brisbane River. Consequently, a new colony at Moreton Bay was established in 1824. Ironically, Pamphlett, an ex-convict, committed another crime and was sentenced to seven years at the new settlement. It eventually became Brisbane, the capital of Queensland, Australia. Without Pamphlett and his fellow castaways, Brisbane might never have been founded.

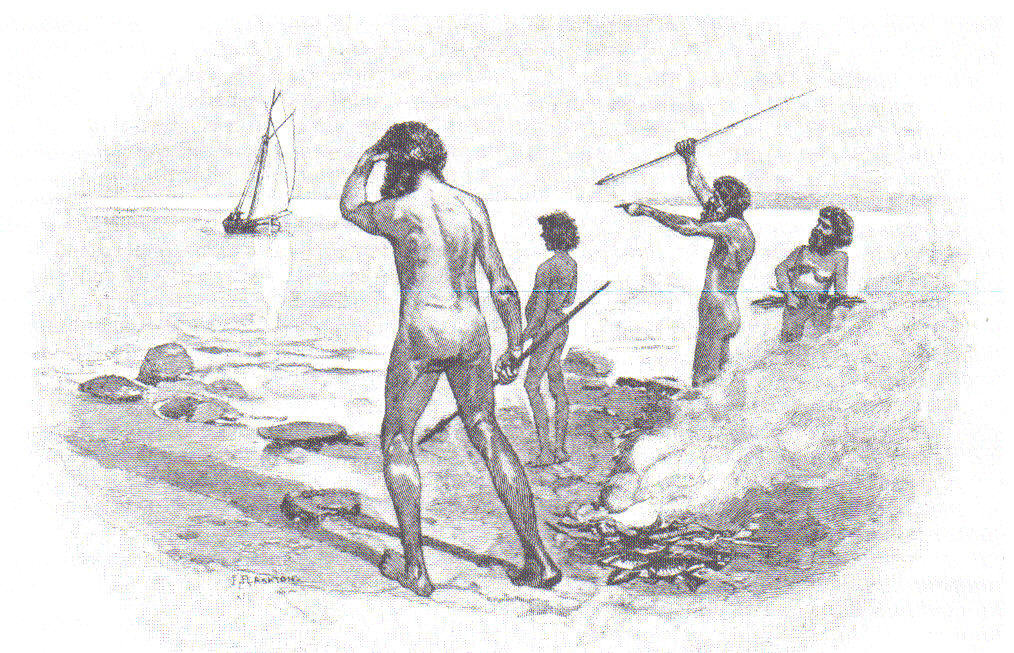
"The finding of Pamphlett", by J.R. Ashton, in A. Garran (ed.), Picturesque Atlas of Australasia, 1886

== Transportation ==
Pamphlett became a brickmaker in Manchester, England. In 1810, he was charged with stealing a horse and five pieces of woollen cloth. The Justices of Assize sentenced him to 14 years' transportation to New South Wales.

== Life as a convict ==
He worked at Brickfield Hill just south of the town and lived at The Rocks. On 28 May 1814, Pamphlett was charged with two others of stealing the windows from Birch Grove House, the first and only building on the Balmain Peninsula, on 13 May. His punishment was 100 lashes at the marketplace and six months in the Sydney gaol gang in double irons.

After four months he absconded, only to be recaptured and put in the carpenter's gang, but he escaped again. Finally, on 29 March 1815, he was sent to Newcastle, a place of secondary punishment 100 miles (160 km) north of Sydney and now the second largest city in New South Wales. Within a few weeks, he disappeared once more. On recapture, Pamphlett was given 50 lashes for "absenting from government labour". In October, he received another 50 strokes for "neglect of government work".

== Commutation of sentence ==
On 31 January 1820, Pamphlett successfully applied to the Governor for commutation of sentence, receiving a conditional pardon. He was returned to Sydney, evidently with a wife and three children. They lived in the Hawkesbury River area west of Sydney, where Pamphlett worked on the river in some capacity. He was sentenced to seven years at Port Macquarie penal settlement for stealing from a house at Pitt Town in early 1822 but was let off due to "unsound mind". He was also reported as "occasionally insane".

== Cedar fetcher ==
Pamphlett and fellow "ticket of leave" convicts Richard Parsons and John Thompson, along with full convict John Finnegan, were hired by settler William Cox to fetch cedar from the Illawarra District, or the Five Islands, now known as Wollongong, 50 miles (80 km) south of Sydney. They set sail on their maiden voyage on 21 March 1823 in an open boat 29 feet (8.8 m) in length and 10 feet (3.0 m) in beam. On board were large quantities of pork and flour and five gallons of rum to buy cedar from the timber cutters, plus four gallons of water.

They got to within sight of Illawarra when a strong breeze blew them away from the coast. The wind became stronger, heavy rain fell and it got dark. They were blown further out to sea. It was five days before they could use any sail, and they drank the water and the rum. Prevailing winds and currents may have taken them most of the way across the Tasman Sea toward New Zealand.

== Lost at sea ==
They were hopelessly lost. They thought they had drifted south and headed northwest to try to get back to Illawarra and Sydney. Pamphlett spotted land on their twenty-second day at sea. Before they could land, Thompson succumbed to the lack of fresh water and the elements, and collapsed and died. They kept his body on board, thinking they would be able to land and bury him, but they couldn't find a spot free of wild surf so buried him at sea after two days.

== Castaway ==
Pamphlett, Finnegan and Parsons finally landed on Moreton Island. Thinking Sydney was to the north, they set off along the beach in this direction with two sacks of flour and a few other items. They spent the next seven and a half months walking around Moreton Bay, island hopping, and following river and creek banks until they could find a way of crossing them. They lived for periods with several Aboriginal tribes who fed them fish and fernroot and thought they were the ghosts of dead kinsmen due to their pale colour.

The natives took them by boat to Stradbroke Island. Here the castaways made their own canoe and got to the mainland, where they landed near what is now Cleveland. They continued their journey northwards along the waterfront in hope of reaching civilisation. It wasn't long before the trio stumbled across a large river which they were unable to cross. They trekked upstream for almost a month, weakened due to lack of good food. With only one reasonable swimmer (Pamphlett), they had to follow the banks of many of the creeks they encountered en route. Upon reaching Oxley Creek, however, they procured a canoe and attempted their first crossing of the river. The canoe was on the western bank of the creek, and was procured by Pamphlett swimming across the creek. The present Pamphlett Bridge at that spot was named for that event. They used the canoe to return to the mouth of the river and continued north. They reached Bribie Island sometime between July and October 1823.

While Pamphlett attended a series of organised fights with an Aboriginal friend, Parsons and Finnegan headed further north. The pair quarrelled and Finnegan returned to Bribie Island to the south. Pamphlett also returned to this spot. Parsons continued northwards.

== Rescued ==
On 29 November 1823, Pamphlett and some Aboriginal people were on the beach at Bribie Island cooking the day's catch when he saw a cutter in the bay. It was explorer John Oxley who had been searching up and down the coast for a new convict settlement. Only then did Pamphlett learn that Sydney was over 500 miles (800 km) to the south rather than to the north. He told part of his story to crew member John Uniacke. Next day they picked up Finnegan who was returning from a tribal fight. He showed Oxley the Brisbane River while Pamphlett assisted Uniacke and others with aspects of Aboriginal culture. Parsons was picked up by Oxley on another trip nearly a year later.

== Moreton Bay convict settlement ==
Oxley took Pamphlett and Finnegan back to Sydney. A year and a half later, as a labourer at Portland Head west of Sydney, Pamphlett committed another crime. He stole two bags of flour, the very food that had initially kept him alive at Moreton Bay. In a further irony, he was sentenced to seven years’ transportation to the new Moreton Bay penal colony, which had been set up after a favourable report on the area by Oxley, thanks to Pamphlett and Finnegan. The Moreton Bay settlement became Brisbane, the capital of Queensland, Australia.

== See also ==
- List of convicts transported to Australia
