= Blue Lake =

Blue Lake may refer to:

== Places ==
Antarctica

- Blue Lake (Ross Island)

Australia

- Blue Lake (New South Wales)
- Blue Lake (Queensland)
  - Blue Lake National Park, a former protected area in Queensland
- Blue Lake / Warwar, South Australia

Canada
- Blue Lake Provincial Park
Croatia

- Blue Lake (Croatia)

Italy

- Blue Lake (Italy)

New Zealand

- Blue Lake (Bay of Plenty)
- Blue Lake (Canterbury)
- Blue Lake (Otago)
- Blue Lake (Tasman)
- Blue Lake (Waikato), in a crater of Mount Tongariro
- Blue Lake (Raoul Island), in the Kermadec Islands

Romania

- Blue Lake (Maramureș County), natural monument, collapsed mine gallery

United States

- Blue Lake (Alaska)
- Arkansas
  - Blue Lake in Crittenden County, Arkansas
  - Blue Lake in Lee County, Arkansas
  - Blue Lake in Ouachita County, Arkansas
  - Blue Lake in Polk County, Arkansas
  - Either of two Blue Lakes in Prairie County, Arkansas
  - Blue Lake in Union County, Arkansas
  - Blue Lake in Woodruff County, Arkansas
- California
  - Blue Lake, California – a city in Humboldt County
  - Blue Lakes (California) – a string of lakes in Lake County
  - Blue Lake (Madera County, California)
- Florida
  - Blue Lake, north of Lake Placid, Florida
  - Blue Lake (Sebring, Florida)
- Indiana
  - Blue Lake, Indiana
  - Blue Lake, Indianapolis, Indiana
- Michigan
  - Blue Lake (Michigan)
  - Blue Lake Township, Kalkaska County, Michigan
  - Blue Lake Township, Muskegon County, Michigan
- Minnesota
  - Blue Lake (Hubbard County, Minnesota)
- New Mexico
  - Blue Lake (New Mexico)
- Oregon
  - Blue Lake Regional Park in Fairview, Oregon
  - Blue Lake (Oregon)
- Washington
  - Blue Lake, in Grant County, Washington, north of Soap Lake, Washington
- Utah
  - Blue Lake (Utah)

== Other ==
- a variety of Green beans
- Blue Lake Fine Arts Camp in Twin Lake, Michigan
- Blue Lake (album), live album by Don Cherry released in 1974

== See also ==
- Blue Lakes
- Blausee (Blue Lake) in Switzerland
- Qinghai
- Lake Göygöl
