= Lac Bleu =

Lac Bleu may refer to:

- Lac Bleu d'Ilhéou, a lake in Hautes-Pyrénées, France
- Lac Bleu de Lesponne, a lake in Hautes-Pyrénées, France

== See also ==
- Blue Lake (disambiguation)
- Blausee
