= North Stradbroke Island =

Island that lies within Moreton Bay in the Australian state of Queensland

Native name: Minjerribah Nickname: Straddie
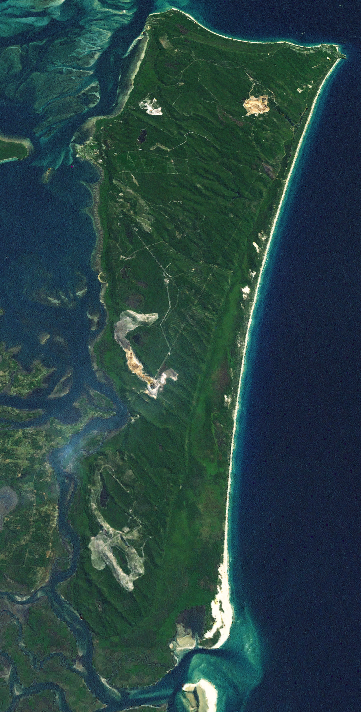
- NASA World Wind Landsat montage

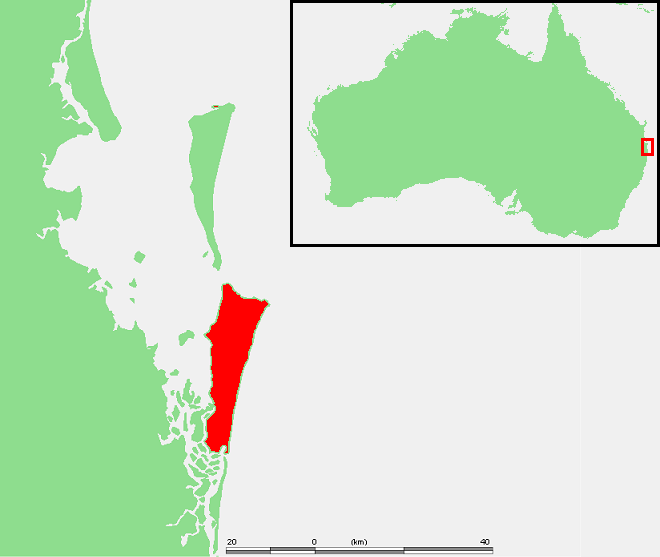

Geography
- Location: Moreton Bay
- Coordinates: 27°35′S 153°28′E
- Area: 275.2 km^{2} (106.3 sq mi)
- Length: 38 km (23.6 mi)
- Width: 11 km (6.8 mi)
- Highest elevation: 239 m (784 ft)

Administration
- Australia
- State: Queensland
- Region: South East Queensland
- Metropolis: Brisbane
- Local government area: Redland City

Demographics
- Population: 2026 (2011 census)
- Ethnic groups: Quandamooka people

Additional information

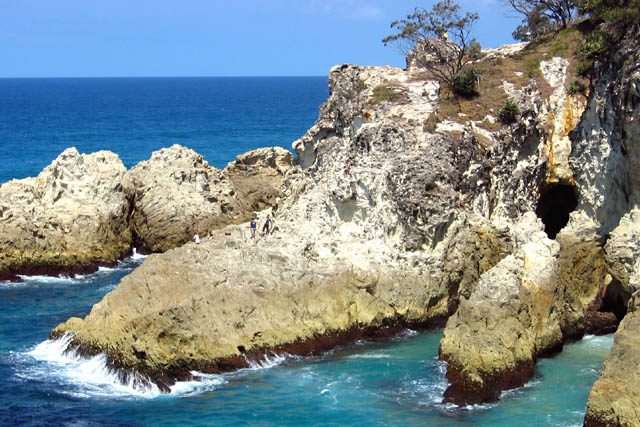
Eastern wall of the North Gorge, as seen from the Gorge Walk at Point Lookout

North Stradbroke Island (Minjerribah), colloquially Straddie or North Straddie, is an island that lies within Moreton Bay in the Australian state of Queensland, 30 kilometres (19 mi) southeast of the centre of Brisbane. Originally there was only one Stradbroke Island but in 1896 it split into North Stradbroke Island and South Stradbroke Island separated by the Jumpinpin Channel. The Quandamooka people are the traditional owners of North Stradbroke island.

The island is divided into four localities: Dunwich, Amity and Point Lookout are small localities centred on the towns of the same name, while the remainder of the island is in the locality of North Stradbroke Island. All the localities are within the City of Redland.

At 275.2 square kilometres (106.3 sq mi; 68,000 acres), it is the second largest sand island in the world. On the island there are three small towns, a number of lakes and beaches along most of the seaward coastline with rocky outcrops at Point Lookout. An Aboriginal presence on the island has been long and ongoing, resulting in a successful native title determination. Tourism is a major and growing industry on the island. The island has been the site for sand mining for more than sixty years. Tourism and currently mining are the island's main industries.

== Geography and ecology ==
North Stradbroke Island is the second largest sand island in the world. North Stradbroke, South Stradbroke and Moreton Island act as a barrier between Moreton Bay and the Coral Sea.

The island is about 38 kilometres (24 mi) long and 11 kilometres (6.8 mi) wide with an area of roughly 275 square kilometres (106 sq mi) and a maximum elevation of 239 metres (784 ft) AHD. The climate of North Stradbroke Island is sub-tropical with warm, moist summers and mild winters. Average annual rainfall is 1,587 millimetres (62.5 in) and mean annual maximum temperature is 25 °C (77 °F).

The population of the island at the 2011 census was 2026, comprising 883 in Dunwich, 678 in Point Lookout, 348 in Amity, and 117 elsewhere on the island. The number of people on the island swells significantly during the holiday season. The island is only accessible by vehicular or passenger ferries leaving from Cleveland.

There are three townships on the island. Dunwich is the largest and has most of the island's services including a school, medical centre, local museum and the University of Queensland's Moreton Bay Research Station. Point Lookout (referred to locally as "the point") is on the surf side of the island and is the major tourist destination in the holiday season. The third is Amity Point which is much smaller and a popular fishing spot on the island. Flinders Beach is a small settlement of mostly holiday houses located on the main beach between Amity and Point Lookout.

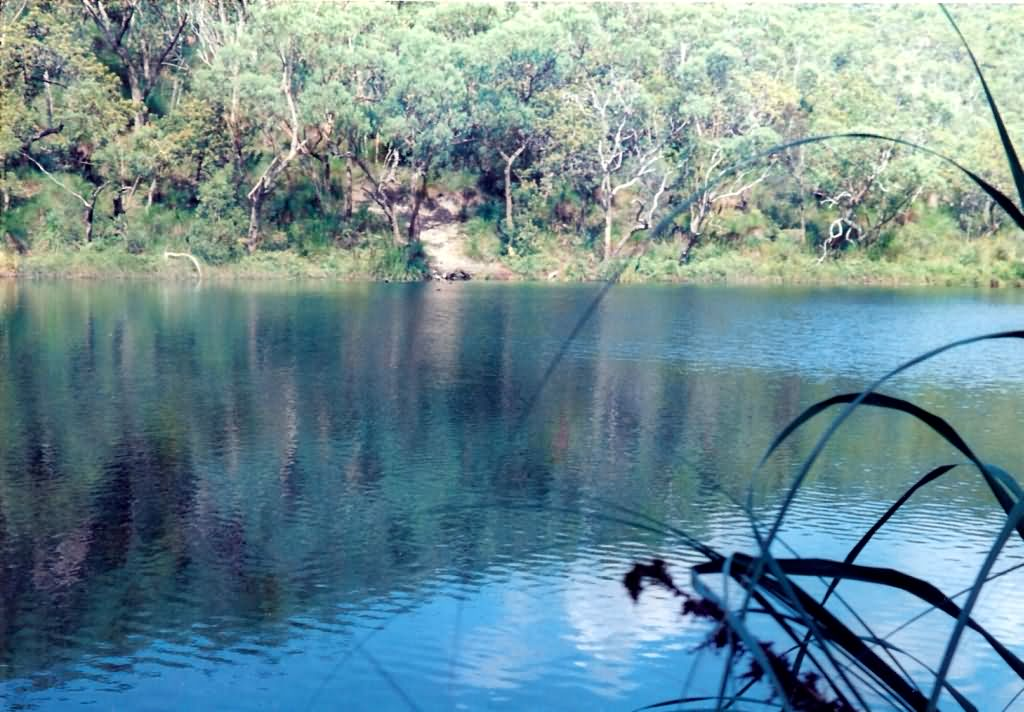
Blue Lake

The whole of the island is part of the Redland City local government area, and is incorporated as part of Division 2. The two largest lakes on the island are Brown Lake and Blue Lake.

In January 2014, about 60% of the island's bushland was consumed by bushfires, later to regenerate.

=== Beaches ===
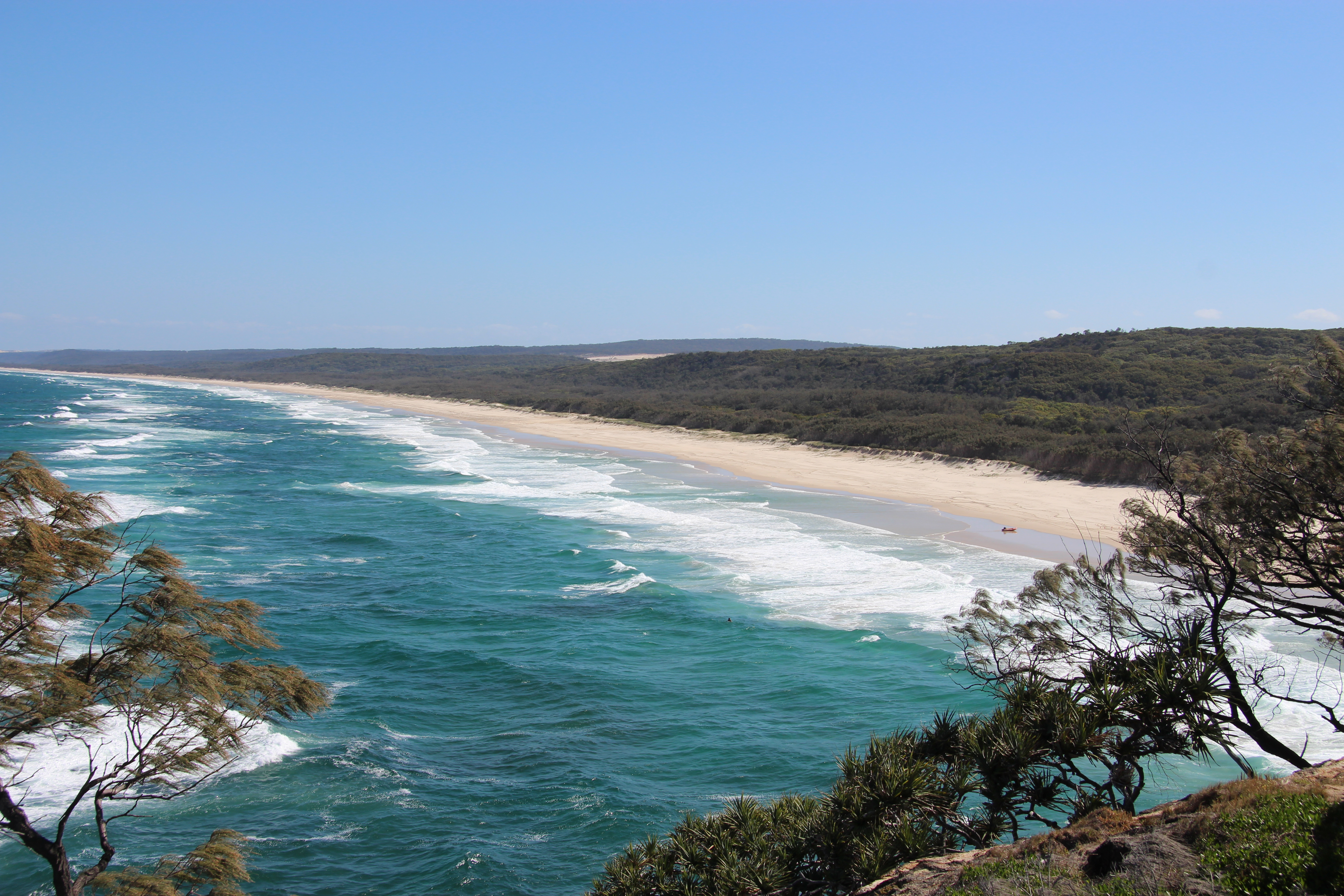
View south from Point Lookout of Main Beach, 2014

Five main beaches provide fishing, surfing and water opportunities on North Stradbroke Island. These are Main Beach which is 32 kilometres (20 mi) long and good for surfing, Cylinder Beach which is a protected swimming beach with a smaller swell, Home Beach which is popular with swimmers, Frenchmans Beach/Deadmans Beach with rock pools but no lifesaving service and Flinders Beach which offers good swimming and beach camping. Main Beach is also the location of the entry to the Keyhole Track, which is one of the top 4WD tracks near Brisbane. The entrance is near Point Lookout to the south.

=== Lakes, springs and wetlands ===
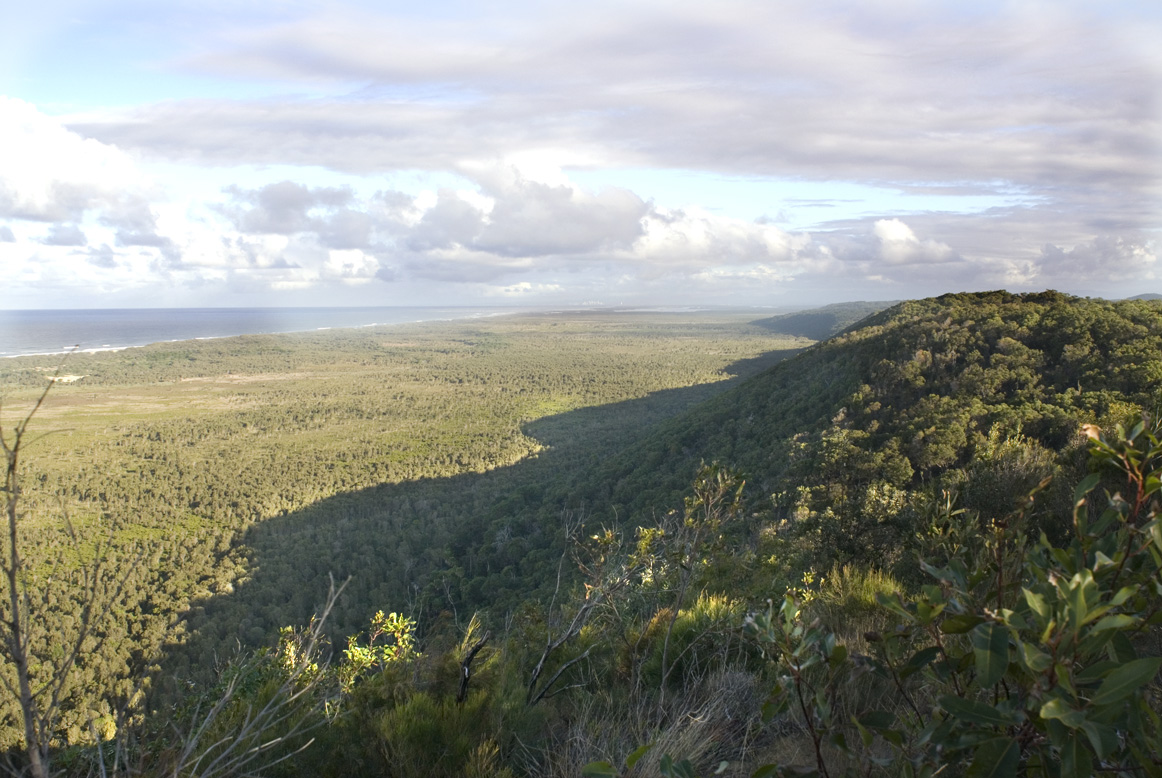
View of the wetland from the high dune escarpment

North Stradbroke Island has over 100 freshwater lakes and wetlands and contains significant groundwater resources which are accessed by local communities and a sand mining company, Sibelco Australia. In addition, a significant volume of groundwater is exported to the mainland. There is a higher number of wetlands that have been in existence since the last ice age than anywhere else on the Australian mainland. While there is the potential for expanded groundwater use, because so little is known about groundwater-dependent water bodies and ecosystems any expanded groundwater use is suspended. Dependent ecosystems include freshwater and estuarine wetlands, mangrove and paperbark communities, and surface-water fauna. Many of the wetlands are places for threatened migratory wading birds, including 34 species listed by JAMBA and CAMBA Moreton Bay Ramsar area, Marine, migratory (EPBC Act).

==== Blue Lake ====
Blue Lake, one of the largest lakes on the island, is protected within the Naree Budjong Djara National Park and is of cultural significance to the Quandamooka people of Stradbroke Island. It is a spring-fed lake relying on the stable aquifer feeding it. This stable hydrology means it has been untouched by climate change and appears to be in the same condition as it was 7,500 years ago. Blue Lake has been an important climate "refuge" for the freshwater biota of the region, and with appropriate management, the lake could continue relatively unchanged for hundreds, possibly thousands of years to come.

==== Brown Lake ====
Brown Lake is a perched lake which retains its water due to a layer of leaves lining the lake floor and is of cultural significance to the Quandamooka people of Stradbroke Island. The precipitated matter eventually forms an impermeable layer, preventing water from percolating to the water table.

==== Eighteen Mile Swamp ====
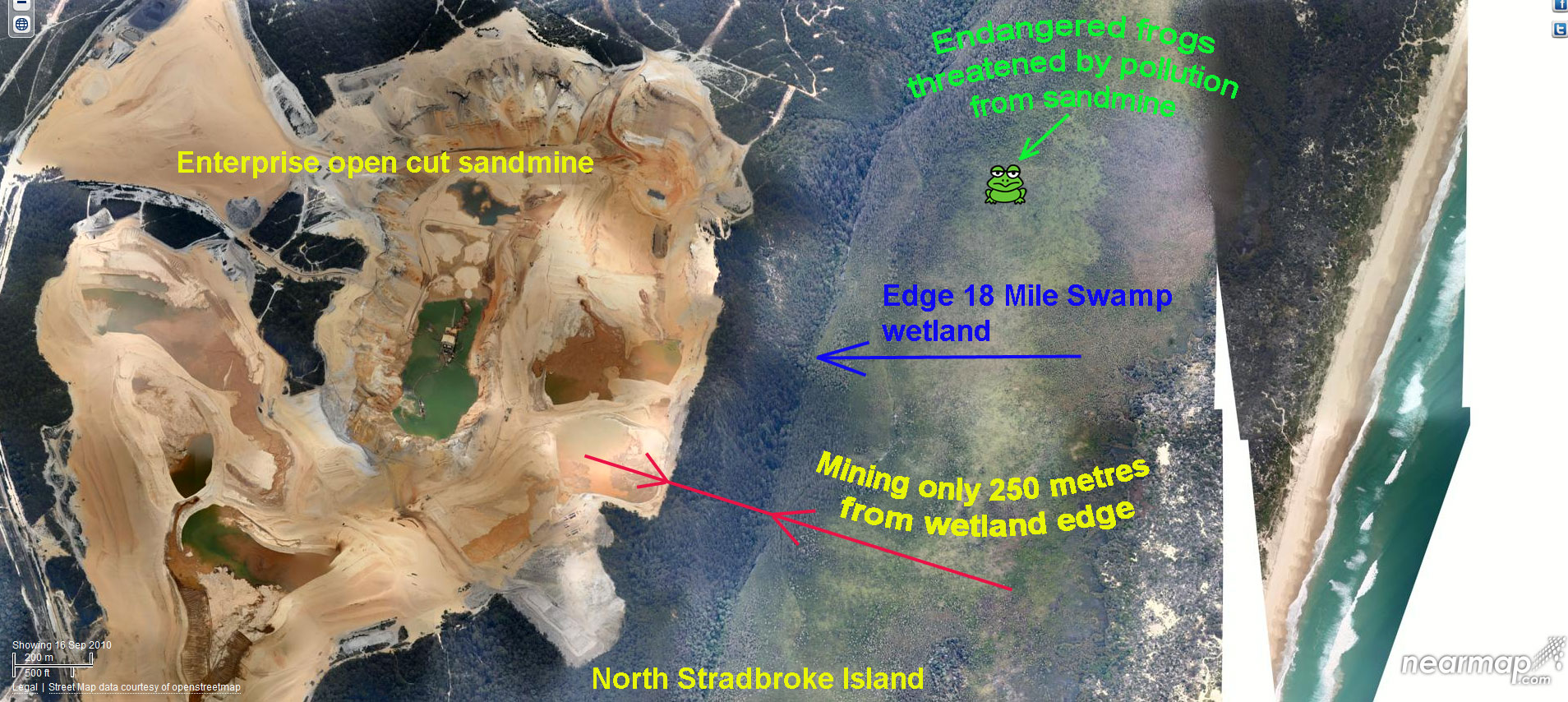
Aerial view of the Eighteen Mile Swamp and the Enterprise sand mine operating close by

The Eighteen Mile Swamp is the largest of its kind in the world and, in particular, is a fine and extensive representation of a coastal freshwater swamp. It is unusual for its size and dimensions (very long and narrow), covering 30 square kilometres (12 sq mi) and is considered to be very young (500–6,000 years) compared with similar swamps. On 27 March 2011, the area was declared a national park, named Naree Budjong Djara National Park, My Mother Earth, by the Quandamooka people, the traditional owners of Minjerribah (North Stradbroke Island), who are engaged in its joint management with the Queensland State government. The wetland is in close proximity to the extensive Enterprise Mine.

The Eighteen Mile Swamp is home to many endangered, rare species, including the vulnerable Cryptocarya foetida whose habitat is the notophyll vine forest found at the foot and lower slope of parabolic high dunes on the west of the wetland. These high dunes on the west of Eighteen mile swamp provide excellent examples of long parabolic dunes migrating across North Stradbroke island from the south-east to the north-west. This migration has buried earlier positions of the west coast escarpment to form complex hydrological systems with the ancient dunes (estimated at up to 300,000 years old). No comparative examples of the phenomenon are seen on Moreton and Fraser Islands.

==== Myora Springs and Myora Creek Swamp ====
Myora Springs is a unique wetland site on the north west side of North Stradbroke Island, of particular cultural significance to the Quandamooka people as a sacred gathering site, and is also a declared fish habitat area. Myora Springs is known to be essential habitat for the vulnerable water mouse (Xeromys myoides) and the endangered swamp orchid (Phaius australis).

==== Lake Kounpee ====
Another perched lake, Lake Kounpee was partially drained after sand mining operations breached the impervious layer in 1987. CRL spent over $300,000 in the 10 years following this in attempts to fix the damage, and now acknowledge they can not repair the damage to the lake – "turning a clear freshwater lake into a reedy waterhole".

==== Other lakes and wetlands ====
Other perched lakes include Black Snake Lagoon, Ibis lagoon (whose melaleuca community is unique in structure and floristics from other melaleuca areas on the island), Welsby Lagoon, Native Companion Lagoon and the ephemeral Tortoise Lagoon within the Naree Budjong Djara National Park. Amity swamp suffered, in 1991, when up to 100,000 litres of diesel spilled from the sand mining company, Consolidated Rutile Limited [CRL]. This was not reported until 1994, the same year CRL was awarded a commendation in the inaugural State Government Award for Environmental Excellence. It was not until 1997 that the incident was acknowledged in CRL's Annual Report stating that the spill was expected to be cleared by 1999 – eight years after it occurred. The sand mining company was never fined by the Department of Mines and Energy for these environmental incidents and continues operating.

Flinders Swamp and its drainage lines is home to the rare acid frog (Litotia cooloolensis) and the area includes habitats for relict populations of the burrowing skink (Anomalopus truncatus).

View of the Sibelco-owned Yarraman mine site

The Keyholes are a series of clear, freshwater lakes at the northern end of the 18 Mile Swamp popular with visiting canoeists. As the Yarraman Mine is now operating close to these lakes, public access has been closed, as it is a prohibited mining area.

== Fauna ==
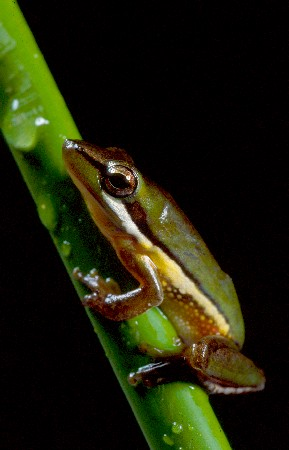
Wallum sedgefrog is a "vulnerable" species living on Straddie

North Stradbroke Island is home to rare, vulnerable, endangered and near threatened animals.

Examples include:

1. Migratory wading birds, including 34 species listed by JAMBA and CAMBA Moreton Bay Ramsar area.
2. Wallum froglet (Crinia tinnula): These occur at Dunwich, Amity, Yarraman Lakes, Blue Lake, Eighteen Mile Swamp, Brown Lake, Amity Swamp, Tortoise Lagoon and Flinders Beach Wetlands.
3. Cooloola sedge frog (Litoria cooloolensis): These occur at Eighteen Mile Swamp, north of the causeway, Brown Lake, Dunwich, Point Lookout, Tortoise Lagoon, Blue Lake, Welsby Lagoon and Yarraman Lakes. The population of L. cooloolensis on North Stradbroke Island has also been called Litoria sp. cf. cooloolensis (North Stradbroke Is) and may represent an unnamed species endemic to the island, as it is genetically distinct and has a different mating call from the other population of L. cooloolensis on the Sunshine Coast.
4. Nannoperca oxleyana (Oxleyan pygmy perch): There are two genetically distinct populations, east and west, but in very low abundance. The eastern population is at Eighteen Mile Swamp and Blue Lake, though only one specimen was collected there by McGregor et al. in 2008. The western population is at Little Canalpin Creek.

== Flora ==
There are 780 plant species recorded for the island, 599 native and 181 introduced species. Of these 14 species are classified as threatened or near threatened species under the Queensland Nature Conservation Act 1992, two of them are endemic to the island.

Examples include:

1. Notophyll vine forest on parabolic high dunes: These occur on the foot and lower slope of high dunes on the west of Eighteen Mile Swamp, Swan Bay area and are the habitat for rare and threatened flora including Cryptocarya foetida.
2. Acacia baueri Bauer's wattle [vulnerable]: These occur in seasonally waterlogged sands in wallum areas such as Canalpin Swamp and Eighteen Mile Swamp.
3. Durringtonia paludosa Durringtonia [near threatened]: These occur in Myora Swamp and Eighteen Mile Swamp, and, in 1993 Bostock and Thomas recorded the first specimens on NSI since 1935.
4. Phaius australis swamp orchid [endangered]: These occur at Flinders Beach Wetlands, Myora and Eighteen Mile swamps.
5. Thelypteris confluens soft swamp fern [vulnerable]: These occur found in permanently swamp areas associated with species of Baumea and Cladium at Flinders Beach Wetlands and Eighteen Mile Swamp.
6. Arthraxon hispidus hairy-joint grass [vulnerable] may no longer be present on the island.
7. Blandifordia grandiflora Christmas bells [endangered]
8. Eleocarpus difformis underwater spikerush [endangered – endemic]
9. Goodenia arenicola [presumed extinct]
10. Olearia hygrophila swamp daisy [endangered – endemic]
11. Persicaria elatior smartweed [vulnerable]
12. Phaius bernaysi swamp orchid [endangered] likely to be a yellow colour form of P. australis, it is likely that no mainland populations remain of this colour form.
13. Pterostylis nigricans brownhood orchid [near threatened]
14. Schoenus scabripes bog rush [near threatened]
15. Thesium australe toadflax [vulnerable]

== History ==
=== Indigenous inhabitants ===
North Stradbroke Island has archaeological evidence of continuous human occupation from the Pleistocene epoch. The Aboriginal name for the island has come to be accepted as Minjerribah. This word appears to have been derived from the nearby mainland Yugambeh language describing a site on the southern part of the island meaning "place of mosquitoes".

The Aboriginal clans of North Stradbroke Island include the Nunukul clan from the northern parts of the island and the Goenpul clan from the more southern parts of the island. The closely affiliated Ngugi people of Moreton Island often travelled across to Stradbroke Island to interact with the Nunukul and Goenpul. After British colonisation, the Ngugi people made North Stradbroke Island their main location of residence. The clans were proficient fishers who hunted dugong (yungon), turtle, oysters, mullet, nautilus, as well as other seafood and land animals. The women were expert dillybag (dili) makers. The localities of Dunwich (Goompi) and Amity (Bulan) were sites of seasonal villages. Large shell middens around Dunwich indicated that semi-permanent Aboriginal settlement in the vicinity has existed for at least the past 40,000 years.

The Quandamooka people is the modern name for the descendants of the Nunukal, Goenpul and Ngugi tribes. Quandamooka is the Aboriginal name for Moreton Bay. This group was traditionally nomadic, moving between a number of semi-permanent settlements and living off the land.

The last known traditional initiation site (known as a bora or kippa-ring) was located at the southern end of the island near Swan Bay. It appears to have been in use up til the start of the 1900s.

In July 2011, the Quandamooka people of North Stradbroke Island won a 16-year-long battle to have their Native Title claim recognised. The Federal Court determinations outline native title rights and interest over land and waters on and around North Stradbroke Island. According to the Redland City Council, the Quandamooka People's native title consent determinations cover the majority of North Stradbroke Island, Peel Island and other surrounding Moreton Bay islands and waters.

=== Arrival of the British ===
The first recorded visit by a European was by Matthew Flinders in 1802, who was seeking a source of fresh water at Point Lookout. He was impressed by the Aboriginal people's health and hospitality. There is also a local legend that the remains of a Spanish or Portuguese shipwreck known as the Stradbroke Island Galleon exist somewhere in the 18 Mile Swamp.

In 1823, three shipwrecked convicts, Thomas Pamphlett, John Finnegan and Richard Parsons, spent time on the island after they were washed ashore on Moreton Island. The local Aboriginal people supplied them with food and shelter. Their experiences prompted interest in the Moreton Bay area and in 1824, John Oxley arrived to survey the area with the view of establishing the Moreton Bay Penal Colony.

=== Maritime pilot station at Amity ===
In 1825, Amity Point was chosen as the first British settlement on the island through the establishment of a maritime pilot station. It was selected because of its location close to the South Passage into Moreton Bay.

The pilot station was occupied by the pilot, the convict boat crew and several soldiers. An adjacent village of Ngugi and Nunukul people co-existed with the pilot station, its occupants still living a mostly traditional lifestyle throughout the 1830s. By the 1840s some of the local Ngugi and Nunukul men became employed as crew for the pilot boat at Amity.

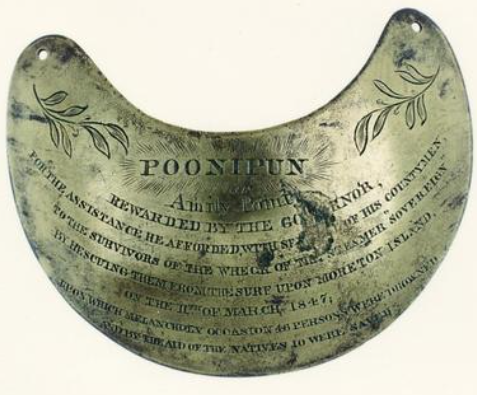
Brass breastplate awarded to Poonipun for assistance in the "Sovereign" shipwreck of 1847

In 1847, the paddle steamer Sovereign was wrecked in heavy swell in the passage off Amity. Forty-four people on board died, but ten were saved, mostly through the efforts of the Aboriginal pilot boat crewmen named Toompani, Billy Cassim, Jack Kalider, Poonipun and Woondi. They all received an Aboriginal breastplate as a reward and Toompani also was given a boat.

The wreck of the Sovereign highlighted the dangers of using the South Passage between Stradbroke and Moreton Island for shipping, and the main shipping channel for Brisbane was transferred to the safer North Passage between Bribie and Moreton Island. As a result, the pilot station at Amity was shut in 1848 and moved to the northern part of Moreton Island.

=== British outpost at Dunwich ===
The British establishment at Dunwich was built in 1827 as a cargo depot, military outpost and convict station to service the larger nearby Moreton Bay Penal Settlement. The convicts assigned at Dunwich were put to work cutting and preparing timber from cedar logs which were rafted across the bay from the mainland. They also laboured on a cotton plantation formed there and worked to unload and transfer shipping cargo.

Dunwich was named by Sir Ralph Darling on 16 July 1827, in honour of Viscount Dunwich, the Earl of Stradbroke, father of Captain Henry John Rous RN, commander of HMS Rainbow, which carried Governor Darling to Moreton Bay and surveyed the immediate Dunwich area.

Aboriginal people were displaced from Dunwich by this British outpost and conflict occurred between the invaders and the Nunukul around 1830. Two white people were killed and a battle between the soldiers and Indigenous warriors occurred at Naranarawai Creek. Reports vary that this skirmish resulted in a few people being wounded to a massacre of the Nunukul people being perpetrated. In 1832, the convict station and outpost at Dunwich was closed, however it was still used as a timber depot until 1837.

=== Quarantine facility at Dunwich ===
From 1850 to 1864, Dunwich became a quarantine station for in-coming migrants who were deemed to be an infection risk to the population at Brisbane. In 1850, 26 people including two doctors, died at the facility due to a typhus outbreak spread from a quarantined vessel named Emigrant. The victims were buried at Dunwich Cemetery.

=== Dunwich Benevolent Asylum ===
In 1864 the quarantine station was converted into the Dunwich Benevolent Asylum for the elderly and infirmed, one of Queensland's first such facilities. In 1892, a leper colony was established as part of the asylum, but this was moved in 1907 to the Peel Island lazaret. The Benevolent Asylum itself was moved to Sandgate in 1946.

Aboriginal people were not allowed to live at the Asylum or in Dunwich and were instead placed at either the nearby Myora Mission or at One Mile (also known as Moopi Moopi Pa), which was a fringe camp between Myora and Dunwich. Some Indigenous families left the island with many relocating to the Black's Camp, Wynnum. A guarded fence was placed between Dunwich and the One Mile camp. Many of labourers at the Asylum, however, were Aboriginal and had to travel to Dunwich to work. These people became some of the first Aboriginal people in Australia to receive equal wages. In 1944, after a 25-year campaign, the Aboriginal workers gained equal wages almost 20 years before anywhere else in Australia. The Asylum closed shortly after.

=== Dugong fishing station at Amity ===
After the relocation of the pilot station, Amity became a base for commercial dugong fishing operations. This was primarily led by a Filipino ex-convict named Fernandez Gonzales, who had befriended the local Aboriginal community at Amity. He had married a Ngugi woman named Junnumbin (Juno) and was able to work with Aboriginal people to harvest the dugong. Other fishing ventures owned by the Campbell brothers, the Stillers and the Crouchs also became based at Amity. Commercial dugong harvesting ended around 1930.

=== Aboriginal missions ===
A mission was established at Moongalba by Passionist priests in 1843, but their attempts failed and they left the island not long afterwards.

Myora Mission was established as a mission station in 1892 at Moongalba. It became an Aboriginal reserve and school after a child was killed there by the matron of the mission in 1896. It eventually closed in 1943.

=== Separation of North and South Stradbroke Islands ===
In September 1894, heavy seas drove aground the barque Cambus Wallace at a narrow isthmus roughly halfway down the island's length. Salvage activity (including the detonation of a cargo of explosives) weakened the sand dunes along the spit such that by the spring of 1896, storms and tides had created a permanent opening from Moreton Bay to the Coral Sea, creating North and South Stradbroke Islands, separated by the Jumpinpin Channel.

=== Notable people ===
North Stradbroke Island's most famous local was Oodgeroo Noonuccal, formerly known as Kath Walker, the Aboriginal poet and native-rights campaigner. She was one of the prime movers of the movement that led to the 1997 landmark agreement between the local government council and the Aboriginal people of the area that claimed rights over the island and parts of Moreton Bay.

== Sand mining ==
=== History ===
In 1949, Australian Consolidated Industries (ACI) commenced sand mining operations on North Stradbroke Island. Consolidated Rutile Limited (CRL), an Australian public company listed on the Australian Stock Exchange, took over these sand mining operations in 1966 and operated two of Stradbroke's three sand mines. CRL sand mined mineral sands. From 2001, the third mine, a silica sand mine, has been operated by Unimin Australia Limited, part of mining multi-national SCR-Sibelco, a company privately owned by the Belgian Emsens family. In 1998, Iluka Resources Limited, a publicly listed Australian company, acquired majority interest in CRL. Unimin Australia Limited acquired Iluka Resources majority interest in CRL holdings in 2009, and, in December 2010, the company changed its name to Sibelco Australia (after its Belgian parent company). Iluka Resources remains the overseas selling agent for mineral sands from Sibelco Australia's Enterprise and Yarraman mines.

Mining began in the 1950s on the beachfront and this caused minimal disruption to the environment. However, as mining moved into the interior of the island in the late 1960s and increased in scale and size in the 1970s, the impact on Stradbroke's ecosystem increased with Consolidated Rutile Limited (CRL) starting dredge-mining on Stradbroke's high dunes. There are several accounts from sand mining employees of unusual artifacts being found during dredging operations. Dredge mining involves levelling the high dunes and stripping vegetation to create the dredge pond and this dramatically changed the landscape of Stradbroke. The dredge is continually moving, leaving the tailings sand, so, although the mined dunes are revegetated and stabilised, the original ecology of the Island cannot be replaced. As an alternative, development of the island for seaside residential use was mooted and in 1970 a bridge from the mainland via Russell Island was under serious consideration by the Queensland government. The Queensland Government also proposed a large-scale redevelopment of the island in the mid-1980s which would have seen the population of the island increase tenfold. However, after a concerted bid by conservationists and planners concerned at the impact on wetlands, fish breeding grounds and the impact of population growth, the idea fell from favour in February 1986 when Premier Bjelke-Petersen ruled the idea was not "financially viable".

In 1991, the Australian Government and sand mining companies ACI and CRL attempted to reach an agreement on surrender of some or parts of mining lease tenements to form a national park. Half of North Stradbroke Island was to become a national park in return for a guarantee that mining could continue for the life of several mines in high-grade areas.^{1} The agreement was not signed by either of the mining companies nor the Government and has lapsed.

Sibelco Australia operated three sand mining sites on the island – Enterprise (by far the largest), Vance and Yarraman.

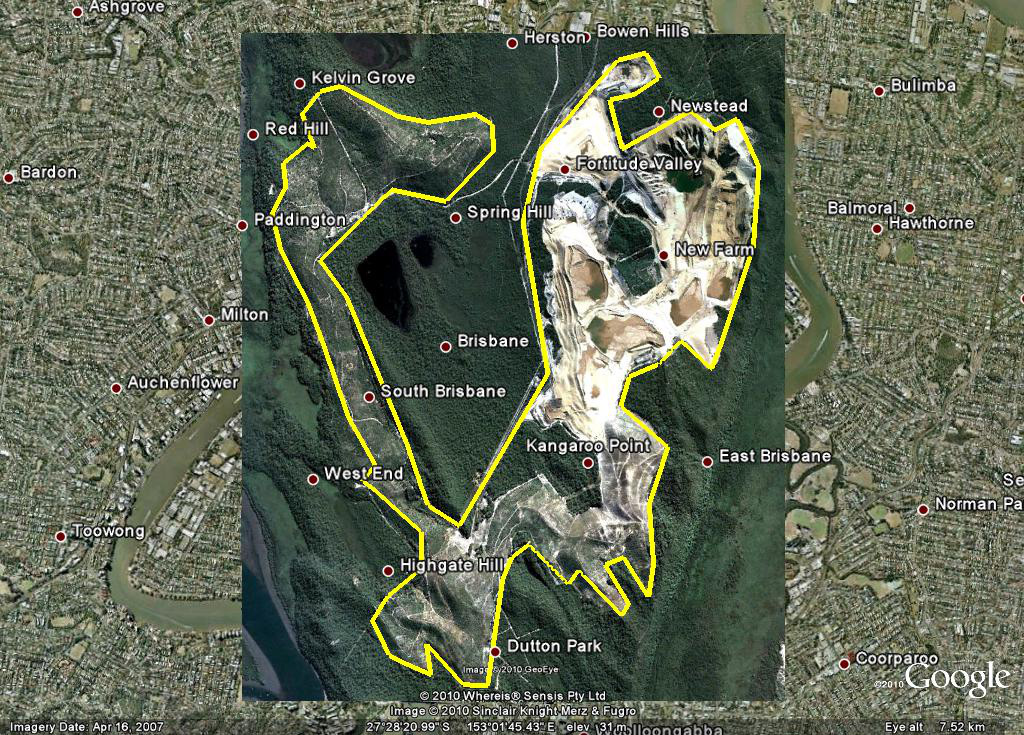
The Sibelco-owned Enterprise Mine overlaid onto a map of Brisbane suburbs, to illustrate the area of the sand mining

Mineral sands and silica sands at Vance mine, near Dunwich, are mined from the surface. Rutile, zircon and ilmenite were dredged from the Enterprise Mine, southeast of Dunwich (and previously the Yarraman Mine, south of Point Lookout). Enterprise was the largest mine on the island and accounted for 60% of the island's production in 2011. It operated in close proximity to the Eighteen Mile Swamp along a migrating dredge path with a buffer zone from the wetlands prescribed by the Queensland Government. Conservationists have expressed concern that these buffer zones, the smallest of which is 25 metres (82 ft), are inadequate to protect the Ramsar-listed wetlands from pollution and will fail to protect the waterways, citing evidence from the 1976 inquiry into sandmining on Fraser Island which found even 500-metre (1,600 ft) buffer between areas mined and wetlands was "totally inadequate".

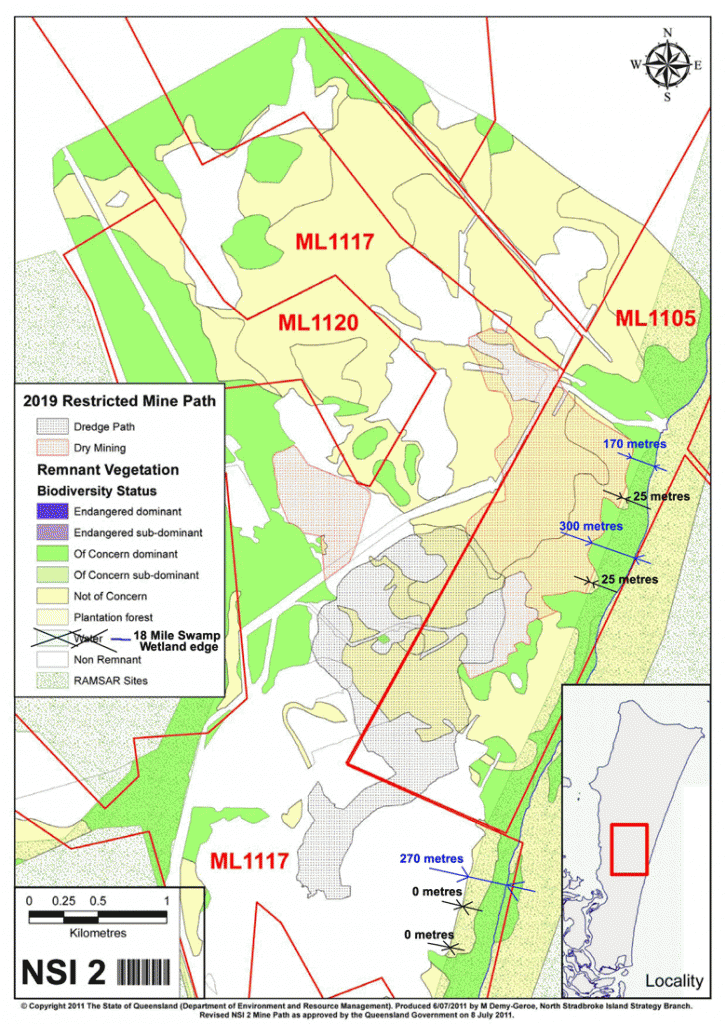
Sibelco-owned Enterprise mine dredging path and buffer zones to 18 Mile Swamp, Ramsar listed, and now Naree Budjong Djara National Park

In 2009, 500,000 tonnes (490,000 long tons; 550,000 short tons) of minerals were being produced by mining about 50 million tonnes of sand. Sibelco Australia produced 500,000 to 600,000 tonnes (490,000 to 590,000 long tons; 550,000 to 660,000 short tons) of sand annually (approximately one per cent of North Stradbroke Island's total sand). The silica extracted was used mainly in glass production, but also in digital tablets such as iPads. The mineral sands were used in paints, plastics, metals, cosmetics and biotechnological devices (such as prosthesis), both for domestic and international markets. The international market for Australian mineral sands, sold through Iluka resources, was mainly China, where 80% of exports are used as pigment in paints. A 2010 KPMG assessment, commissioned by Sibelco Australia, found 95% of revenue from NSI sand mining stayed in the Australian community.

=== Environmental concerns push for closure ===
In 1991, up to 100,000 litres of diesel spilled from the sand mining company, Consolidated Rutile Limited [CRL] into Amity wetlands. This was not reported until 1994, the same year CRL was awarded a commendation in the inaugural State Government Award for Environmental Excellence. It was not until 1997 that the incident was acknowledged in CRL's Annual Report stating that the spill was expected to be cleared by 1999 – eight years after it occurred. The sand mining company was never fined by the Department of Mines and Energy for these environmental incidents and continues operating. In 2008, CRL received the Premier's Environment Protection Agency Sustainability Award for Resources industries for its rehabilitation processes. The award is given to a company that demonstrates leadership in environmental practices and commitment to progressive rehabilitation and long-term sustainability. At that time (according to the Stradbroke Island Management Organisation [SIMO], an environmental watch-dog organisation) two-thirds of the island were covered by mining leases.

In late 2009, CRL, which became a subsidiary of Unimin Australia, itself a subsidiary of Sibelco, after being purchased from Iluka Resources, was charged with illegal sand mining after it was alleged to have sold sand extracted from the island, to the building industry for the production of glass without the correct permit. Sibelco appealed, on technical grounds, the Magistrate's decision that it had a case to answer on the criminal charges for the illegal selling of sand. On 22 May 2014, the Court of Appeal heard the appeal and delivered its judgement, all on the same day. It dismissed Sibelco's appeal against criminal proceedings. The final day of this now five-year-long criminal trial was scheduled for 22 August 2014, in the Warwick Magistrates Court.

In 2009 it became public knowledge that the mining leases on North Stradbroke island had also expired for the areas of operation of the Enterprise and Yarraman Mines. This led to the June 2010 announcement by the then Premier Anna Bligh that sand mining on the island would be phased out by 2027 and the mined land and Ramsar listed wetlands would become national park, eventually to cover 80% of the island. This proposal relied on renewing expired mining leases under the Mineral Resources Act.

In another legal matter, the High Court of Australia ruled against Sibelco in June 2011 over a bid to sell sand to construction companies. Sibelco had lodged the appeal against the Redland City Council's 2008 decision to deny the sand mining company's application to sell 500,000 tonnes (490,000 long tons; 550,000 short tons) of sand to construction companies over the next 100 years.

The ensuing public discussion around future land use saw concern expressed by some residents as to the impact on the island's economy. and by conservationists who saw it as sand mining business as usual, as the non-renewal of expired leases would effectively end mining around 2014. Conservationists campaigned with the simple message that 2027 was, in fact, the forecast date for the exhaustion of the mineral deposits on NSI as already anticipated by the Enterprise and Yarraman mine operators, citing details from CRL's letter of 13 May 2009 to the Australian Securities Exchange [ASIX] that mineral sand mining as an economic force on the island would end by 2027. Sibelco Australia's commercial interests benefited by continued access to the mineral sand deposits on the expired leases until 2027, and, in 2010, Sibelco Australia commissioned Synergies Economic Consulting to report on the economic effect of an earlier closure of sand mining on NSI. The consultant's report predicted an earlier closure of sand mining would prompt a rise in the price of ferry transport services, electricity services and fuel for the 2000 residents, with total employment on the island anticipated to drop by 30%.

Mining lease ML1117, the largest expired lease, contained the extensive Enterprise dredge mine, with a surface area of 1 square kilometre (0.39 sq mi) and a depth of 100 metres (330 ft). The application process for the renewal of mining leases requires the Minister for Mines for the Queensland government to consider future land uses of the area covered by the expired mining lease, under special section 286A of the Mineral Resources Act. The Minister can not renew an expired lease if further mining would be inappropriate having regard to future uses of the land. Since it was last renewed in 1986, parts of ML1117 had been included in the national estate because of its high conservation value, parts had been included in the Moreton Bay Ramsar protected wetland and all of it was for inclusion in a future national park. Conservationists foresaw there existed a strong argument that further mining would have been totally inappropriate, given regard for future and continuing land uses and therefore the lease ML1117 could not be renewed under the Mineral Resources Act. Under Queensland law, a ministerial decision to renew ML1117 would have allowed a right to judicial review of the decision in the Queensland Supreme Court by indigenous owners, the Quandamooka people of NSI, and conservationists. These parties had publicly flagged they would certainly use that right, given the good prospects of overturning the lease renewal decision upon judicial review, and bringing about the cessation of sand mining on the island around 2014.

In response to the public debate, and to the very real likelihood that expired mining leases would not be successfully renewed under the Minerals Resources Act if proper regard was given to future land use, on 22 March 2011 then Premier Anna Bligh announced that the Enterprise Mine would continue the operating until 2019, the Yarraman mine would operate until 2015 and the silica mine (Vance) until 2025. The Queensland government would approve sand mining on North Stradbroke Island not through considering an application for renewal of a mining lease under the Mineral Resources Act, but through the passage of a new Act, the Stradbroke Island Sustainability and Protection Act 2011 (NSI Act). This Act was passed in April 2011. The act renewed the key expired Enterprise Mine mining lease ML1117 until 31 December 2019 and also extinguished the pre-existing judicial rights of conservationists and Indigenous owners opposed to renewal of the leases. The act also renewed two expired leases to facilitate continued silica sand mining at Vance until 2025.

Under the State Government's Stradbroke Island Sustainability and Protection Act 2011, 80% of the island will become national park by 2026. The national park will be jointly managed by the Quandamooka people under the Indigenous land use agreement. The State Government planned to develop tourism opportunities by creating new walking tracks, camping grounds and recreational facilities. However, economic modeling undertaken by consultants commissioned by Sibelco Australia, Synergies Economic Consulting, states the growth in labour demand from tourism expansion is not expected to be rapid. This was because, at the time of the report in 2011, there was an overall weakness in domestic tourism across Australia. Under the 2011 legislation, the Enterprise mine was to close by 2019, and the much smaller Vance mine by 2025.

In January 2012, then state opposition LNP leader Campbell Newman announced that if elected his party would restore rights around mining leases to what they were [prior to the NSI Act passed in April 2011] and Sibelco Australia supported his electoral campaign by posting letters to voters by "mine supporters" without required disclosure, urging a vote for Campbell Newman. Sibelco belatedly obtained authorisation and in 2013 filed a disclosure revealing it had spent more than A$90,000 on postage and printing. However, this election promise was not fulfilled, with no restoration of rights to citizens extinguished by the North Stradbroke Island Sustainability Act. Instead, in 2013 the LNP Government passed legislation that allows sand mining on the island for an extra 16 years from 2019 to 2035. The circumstances leading up to this legislative amendment were referred to Queensland's Crime and Misconduct Commission.

The public debate concerning sand-mining re-opened in late 2012 when conservationists and Indigenous traditional owners, the Quandamooka people of NSI, discovered that the Enterprise mine had commenced operation in 2004 without Federal government approval under the Environment Protection and Biodiversity Conservation Act 1999 (EPBC Act). As the Enterprise mine operates in close proximity to the Ramsar protected wetlands, experts had advised that the mine was having significant impact on the adjoining wetland, as water used in the sand mine's operation flows into these protected areas. The wetlands are part of complex hydrological systems forming art of the ancient dunes, some up to 300,000 years old, and the long-term impacts on the wetlands are unknown. In August 2013, Friends of Stradbroke Island Inc was preparing to take Sibelco Australia to the Federal Court, as the Federal Government had not taken any steps to enforce Sibelco's compliance with Australian environment protection laws.

On 6 June 2014 the Quandamooka people initiated a legal challenge, saying that the LNP Government's extension of mining contravened the Native Title Act 1993 (Cwth).

When Labor won office in 2015, the Palaszczuk government returned the end date to 2019.

=== Closure of the sand mines ===
The Yarraman mine closed in 2015. The Enterprise site was wound up in 2019, as per the 2011 legislation, while the mining lease on the much smaller Vance mine ended in 2025. A statement of intent was signed on 20 February 2019 by Sibelco Australia, the Queensland government and the Quandamooka people, by which the three sand mines would be rehabilitated. It would cost tens of millions of dollars and take five to six years. The Quandamooka Yoolooburrabee Aboriginal Corporation would move from its role in land care and cultural heritage advice into being responsible for the later stages of rehabilitation and developing the island as a cultural and wildlife sanctuary.

=== Community fund ===
In 2011, Sibelco announced the formation of a new community fund, funded from the profits of sand mining – the Belgian family-owned mining company has made profits of approximately $1.5Billion dollars from its sand mining lease on Stradbroke Island. According to the fund, it "is the largest community investment ever made in the history of the Bay Islands". The fund is administered by an advisory board, constituted by two members from each of the island's townships and an executive chairperson. However, no Quandamooka people, who had their native title claim recognised in July 2011, after a 16-year proceeding, are members of the board of this community fund.

== Arts, culture and tourism ==
Arts such as fibre art and basketry and weaving techniques are being taught in workshops, and the Quandamooka Yoolooburrabee Aboriginal Corporation is working to expand the tourism industry based on arts and culture, both Indigenous and non-Indigenous. The Quandamooka Festival and the Quandamooka Arts Museum and Performance Institute (QUAMPI), which opened in 2025, are examples of this revitalisation of cultural tourism.

== See also ==
- List of islands of Queensland
- North Stradbroke Island Historical Museum
- Point Lookout Light
- Myora Mission, an "industrial and reform school" as a source of cheap labour under "assimilation through institutionalisation" prior to the Aboriginals Protection and Restriction of the Sale of Opium Act 1897.
