= Interlachen =

Interlachen may refer to some places in the United States:

- Interlachen, Florida
- Interlachen, Oregon
- Interlachen Country Club in Edina, Minnesota

== See also ==
- Interlaken
