= Blue Lake (Oregon) =

Multiple lakes in Oregon, United States

There are at least 27 features in the U.S. state of Oregon currently or formerly named Blue Lake:

name	type	elevation	coordinate	USGS Map	GNIS ID
Blue Lake (Wallowa County, Oregon)	Lake	7,707 ft (2,349 m)	45.167778°N 117.360833°W	Eagle Cap	1138314
Blue Lake (Slide Lakes, Lake County, Oregon)	Lake	5,755 ft (1,754 m)	42.699167°N 120.726111°W	Slide Mountain	1153794
Blue Lake (Gearhart Wilderness, Lake County, Oregon)	Lake	7,034 ft (2,144 m)	42.530278°N 120.860833°W	Lee Thomas Crossing	1117846
Blue Lake Camas Prairie Trail	Trail	4,373 ft (1,333 m)	44.870278°N 121.729722°W	Boulder Lake	1138316
Blue Lake (Wasco County, Oregon)	Lake	5,089 ft (1,551 m)	44.842778°N 121.740278°W	Boulder Lake	1117847
Blue Lake Resort (Oregon)	Locale	3,461 ft (1,055 m)	44.415278°N 121.765278°W	Three Fingered Jack	1156426
Blue Lake (Jefferson County, Oregon)	Lake	3,461 ft (1,055 m)	44.412500°N 121.768889°W	Three Fingered Jack	1138312
Blue Lake (Multnomah County, Oregon)	Lake	3,773 ft (1,150 m)	45.500000°N 121.868889°W	Bull Run Lake	1138315
Blue Lake Trail (Linn County, Oregon)	Trail	4,554 ft (1,388 m)	44.552500°N 121.872778°W	Marion Lake	1138317
Blue Lake (Linn County, Oregon)	Lake	5,266 ft (1,605 m)	44.521389°N 121.873056°W	Marion Lake	1138313
Crater Lake	Lake	6,174 ft (1,882 m)	42.941944°N 122.106389°W	Crater Lake East	1163669
Blue Lake (Lane County, Oregon)	Lake	5,390 ft (1,640 m)	43.530833°N 122.201389°W	Diamond Peak	1138311
South Blue Lake Group	Lake	5,712 ft (1,741 m)	42.513056°N 122.272778°W	Rustler Peak	1149903
Blue Lake (Klamath County, Oregon)	Lake	5,679 ft (1,731 m)	42.516389°N 122.280556°W	Rustler Peak	1138310
Blue Lake Camp	Locale	5,715 ft (1,742 m)	42.515000°N 122.281667°W	Rustler Peak	1162474
Blue Canyon Lake	Lake	6,145 ft (1,873 m)	42.504167°N 122.284722°W	Rustler Peak	1138289
North Blue Lake Group	Lake	5,873 ft (1,790 m)	42.529167°N 122.290833°W	Rustler Peak	1146884
Blue River Lake (Lane County, Oregon)	Reservoir	1,161 ft (354 m)	44.171944°N 122.330278°W	Blue River	1158909
Blue Lake Regional Park	Park	30 ft (9.1 m)	45.556389°N 122.448056°W	Camas	2040731
Blue Lake (Multnomah County, Oregon)	Lake	16 ft (4.9 m)	45.553611°N 122.448889°W	Camas	1117848
Blue Gill Lake (Marion County, Oregon)	Reservoir	194 ft (59 m)	44.914722°N 122.992500°W	Salem East	1638759
Blue Lake Slough (Benton County, Oregon)	Stream	272 ft (83 m)	44.320278°N 123.242500°W	Harrisburg	1157405
Blue Lake Logging Company	historical locale	1,017 ft (310 m)	45.707500°N 123.479444°W	Cochran	1166510
Blue Lake Lookout	Locale	3,491 ft (1,064 m)	45.671111°N 123.482222°W	Cochran	1162764
Blue Lake (Tillamook County, Oregon)	Lake	2,415 ft (736 m)	45.679167°N 123.535000°W	Rogers Peak	1117849
Blue Lake Guard Station	Locale	2,848 ft (868 m)	45.671111°N 123.544167°W	Rogers Peak	1117850
Rogers Peak	Summit	3,655 ft (1,114 m)	45.664444°N 123.548333°W	Rogers Peak	1132095

== See also ==
- List of lakes in Oregon
