= Olearia hygrophila =

Conservation status
- Endangered (EPBC Act)

Scientific classification
- Kingdom: Plantae
- Clade: Tracheophytes
- Clade: Angiosperms
- Clade: Eudicots
- Clade: Asterids
- Order: Asterales
- Family: Asteraceae
- Genus: Olearia
- Species: O. hygrophila

Binomial name
- Olearia hygrophila (DC.) Benth.

Synonyms
- Aster hygrophilus DC. nom. inval., pro syn.; Eurybia hygrophila DC.; Shawia hygrophila (DC.) Sch.Bip.

Species of shrub

Olearia hygrophila, commonly known as swamp daisy or water daisy, is a species of flowering plant in the family Asteraceae and is endemic to a restricted part of North Stradbroke Island in south-eastern Queensland. It is a shrub with slender stems, linear leaves and white and yellow, daisy-like inflorescences.

== Description ==
Olearia hygrophila is a shrub that typically grows to a height of up to 2 m (6 ft 7 in) and has slender stems. Its leaves are arranged alternately along the branchlets, linear to elliptic, 15–70 mm (0.59–2.76 in) long and 1.5–6 mm (0.059–0.236 in) wide, sometimes with a few teeth on the edges. The heads or "flowers" are arranged in panicles on the ends of branches and are 20–30 mm (0.79–1.18 in) in diameter, each head with white ray florets, the ligule 8–10 mm (0.31–0.39 in) long, surrounding yellow disc florets. Flowering mainly occurs from July to September, and the fruit is a glabrous achene 6–10 mm (0.24–0.39 in) long, the pappus about 5 mm (0.20 in) long.

== Taxonomy ==
This species was first formally described in 1836 by Augustin Pyramus de Candolle who gave it the name Eurybia hygrophila in his Prodromus Systematis Naturalis Regni Vegetabilis, from specimens collected by Allan Cunningham on North Stradbroke Island. In 1867, George Bentham changed the name to Olearia hygrophila in Flora Australiensis. The specific epithet (hygrophila) means "moisture-loving".

== Distribution and habitat ==
Olearia hygrophila grows in swamps and is restricted to the north-east end of North Stradbroke Island in south-eastern Queensland.

== Conservation status ==
This daisy bush is classified as "endangered" under the Australian Government Environment Protection and Biodiversity Conservation Act 1999 and "critically endangered" under the Queensland Government Nature Conservation Act 1992. The main threats to the species include weed invasion, inappropriate fire regimes, land clearing, and changes in hydrology.
