= Blue Lake National Park =

- IUCN category II (national park)
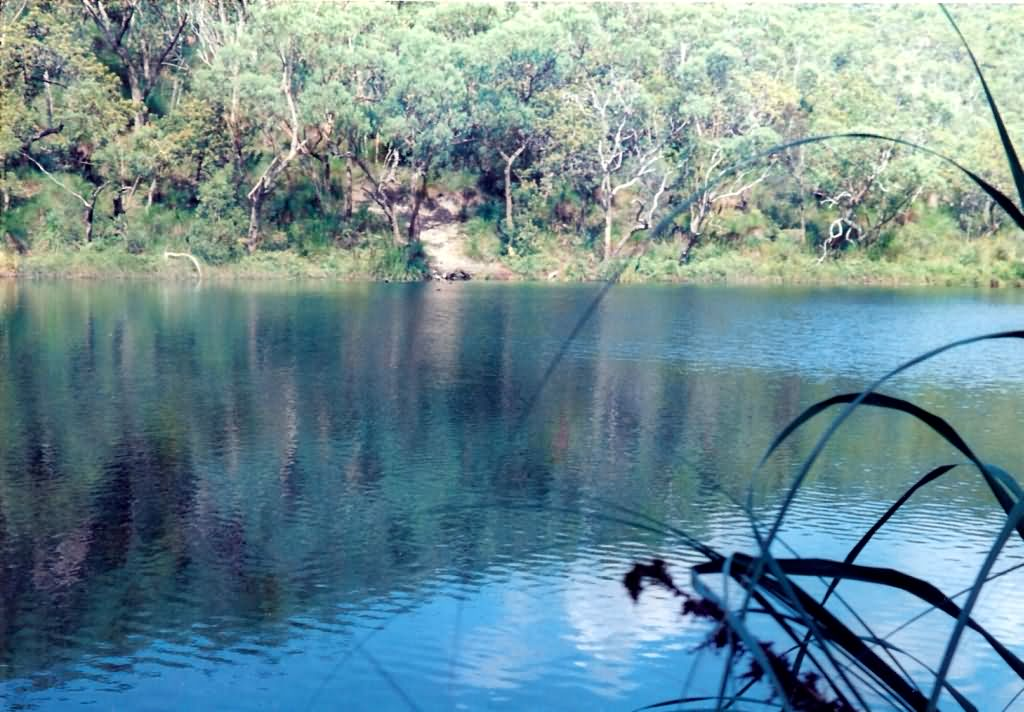

- Location within Queensland
- Location: Queensland
- Coordinates: 27°31′26″S 153°28′43″E
- Area: 5 km^{2} (1.9 sq mi)
- Established: 1962
- Governing body: Queensland Parks and Wildlife Service

Blue Lake National Park
- Interactive map of Blue Lake National Park

Register of the National Estate
- Official name: Register of the National Estate
- Designated: 21 October 1980
- Reference no.: 8650

Blue Lake National Park was a former protected area in Queensland, Australia, located on North Stradbroke Island about 44 kilometres (27 mi) east of Brisbane. Blue Lake National Park is now a part of the Naree Budjong Djara National Park. Access was provided by road 9 kilometres (5.6 mi) west of Dunwich.

In 1980, the national park was described as follows:

Blue Lake is a watertable lake in the coastal sandmass of North Stradbroke Island. The National Park is included in the large North Stradbroke Island – Central Section Interim Listing (for the Register of the National Estate). The statement for that listing places its values in a broader context.

Although only relatively small, Blue Lake contains a diversity of habitats & species, including: Blue Lake, a boomerang-shaped watertable window lake; Tortoise Lagoon, a perched lake receding to swamp that fluctuates between swamp and a lagoon depending on rainfall; and other swamps; examples of dry sclerophyll forest, scrub heath, marshes, herbfields, associated linear swamps with surrounding eucalypt open forest and mallee heath. Such a wide range of features represents a large diversity of habitats.

Five major vegetation types have been mapped in the Blue Lake National Park: mid-high to tall open forest/woodlands dominated by Eucalyptus signata (Scribbly Gum), E. intermedia (Pink Bloodwood) and E. planchoniana (Planchon's Stringybark); sedgelands (freshwater swamps) dominated by Gahnia, Sieberana, and Baumea Spp.; tall to very tall mallee shrublands comprising Pink Bloodwood, Planchon's Stringybark, Banksia aemula (Wallum Banksia) and Scribbly Gum; closed heath of mixed shrubs including Empodisma minus; and tall to very tall open forest/woodland composed primarily of E. pilularis (Blackbutt).

The eastern tip of Blue Lake lies 1.75 km from the ocean at which point a white-sandy bottomed, fast flowing creek with steep fern covered banks, carries the Blue Lake overflow down to Eighteen Mile Swamp. Two creeks that flow permanently, and a swamp, drain into the lake. The deepest parts of the lake reach around 11m in depth.

Two crustacean species, three fresh water fish, one frog species, 12 insect species and one spider were found in the littoral of Blue Lake. Most of the littoral and planktonic insects found in Blue Lake are common and widespread throughout Australia.

The conservation park was classified in 2008 as being an IUCN Category II protected area. In 1980, it was listed on the now-defunct Register of the National Estate.

== See also ==
- Protected areas of Queensland
