= Blue Lake (Utah) =

Large geothermal pond in Utah, U.S.

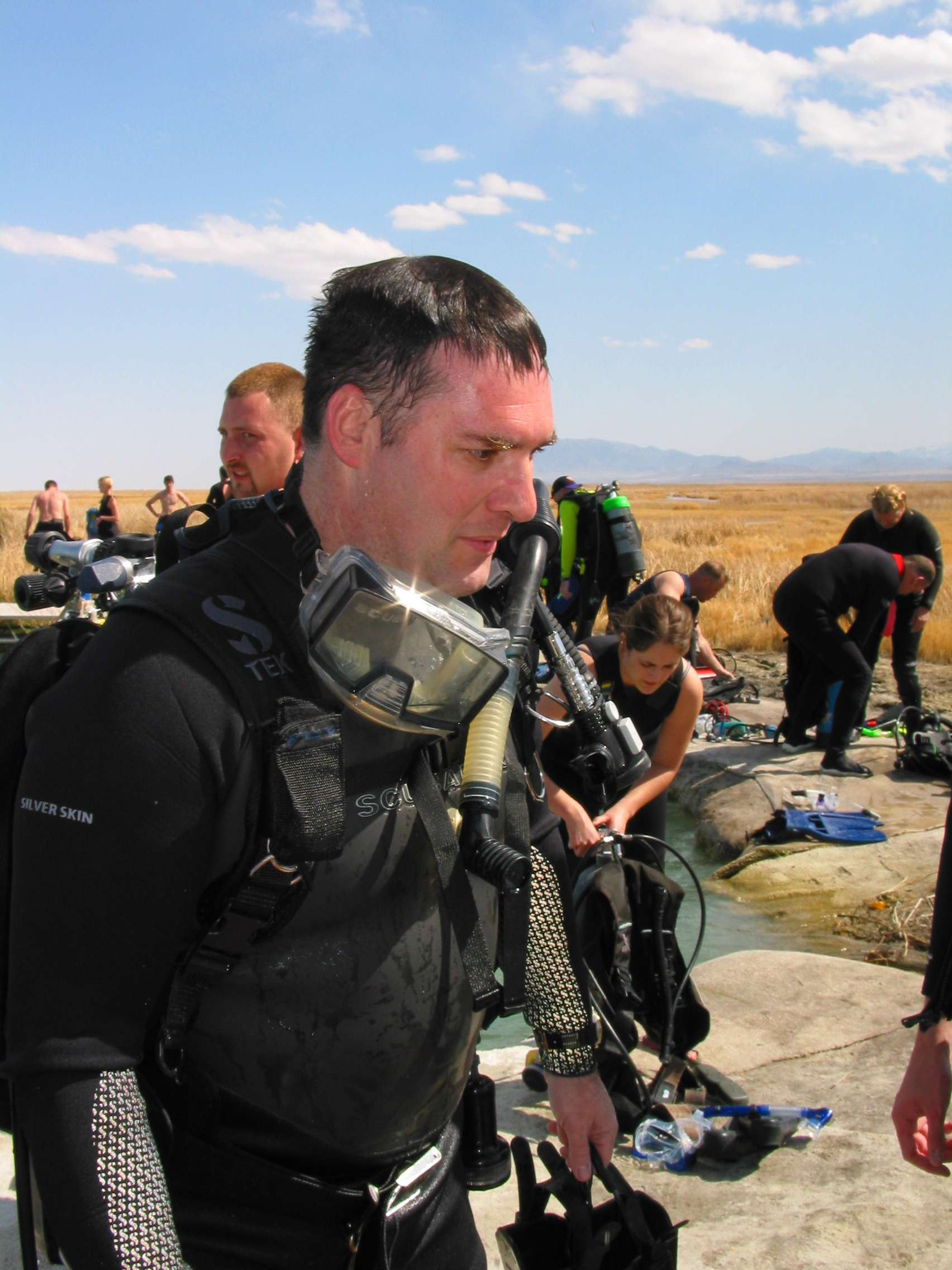
- Scuba divers at the lake

- Location within Utah Location within the United States
- Location: Tooele County, Utah, United States
- Coordinates: 40°30′07″N 114°01′56″W
- Type: spring-fed
- Managing agency: United States Bureau of Land Management
- Surface area: 9 acres (3.6 ha)
- Average depth: 60 ft (18 m)
- Surface elevation: 4,300 ft (1,300 m)
- Max. temperature: 70 °F (21 °C)
- Min. temperature: 60 °F (16 °C)

Blue Lake is a large geothermal pond located about 16 mi (26 km) south of Wendover, Utah at 40°30′07″N 114°01′56″W. The lake is 60 feet (18 m) deep, approximately 9 acres (3.6 ha) in size and at an elevation of 4,300 feet (1,300 m) above sea level. It is located on the Utah Test and Training Range, which is controlled by the United States Air Force, but the lake and its immediate surroundings are publicly accessible wetlands that are managed by the United States Bureau of Land Management (BLM). The BLM permits public access and use but does not permit the erection of permanent structures.

== Scuba diving ==
Blue Lake is a popular spot for area divers. Since its water is warm year-round and reasonably clear, the lake is heavily used on the weekends for dive training, with programs such as the University of Utah Scuba Program. Other nearby high-mountain lakes are clear but cold even in early fall; and lower, warmer lakes tend to be murky. Blue Lake's constant high-volume flow of clear springwater provides underwater visibility of up to 60 feet (18 m) at (rare) times, and year-round bottom temperatures of approximately 85 °F (29 °C). Surface temperatures vary from the high 60s (~20 °C) in winter to the high 70s (~25 °C) in summer.

The lake supports warm-water fish, mostly bass, tilapia, sunfish and bluegill. In addition, divers have placed objects on the bottom, such as large metal sculptures of marine animals, boats, a chair and TV set, to add interest. The bubbling thermal spring on the lake floor is also an interesting site for exploration.

Late fall or early spring provides the best overall diving conditions, since the water is clear (the summer algal bloom is absent), daytime air temperatures are somewhat mild, and the summer's insects are absent. The algal bloom can reduce underwater visibility to a meter or less. However, it is not severe enough to damage the other marine life. During the winter, the lake's water is also clear, but area temperatures make diving unpleasant.

The Utah DWR allows fishing in the lake; bass (6 fish limit), bluegill (50 fish limit), and tilapia (no limit, mandatory keep and kill). The tilapia criteria reflect the fact that this species was introduced to Blue Lake illegally, and it competes with the native game fish for habitat.

== See also ==
- Blue Lake (disambiguation)
- Homestead caldera
