= Naree Budjong Djara National Park =

Australian national park

- IUCN category II (national park)
- Location within Queensland
- Location: Queensland
- Coordinates: 27.6607°S 153.4390°E
- Area: 132.24 km^{2} (51.06 sq mi)
- Established: 2011
- Governing body: Queensland Parks and Wildlife Service

Naree Budjong Djara National Park is a national park on North Stradbroke Island, Queensland, Australia. It contains the former Blue Lake National Park.

== History ==
The 5,240-hectare (12,900-acre) national park was announced on 27 March 2011 by Queensland Premier Anna Bligh and Environment minister Kate Jones.

The name Naree Budjong Djara means My Mother Earth in the Qandamooka language.

== See also ==
- Protected areas of Queensland
