= Interlachen, Oregon =

Unincorporated community in the state of Oregon, United States

- Unincorporated community
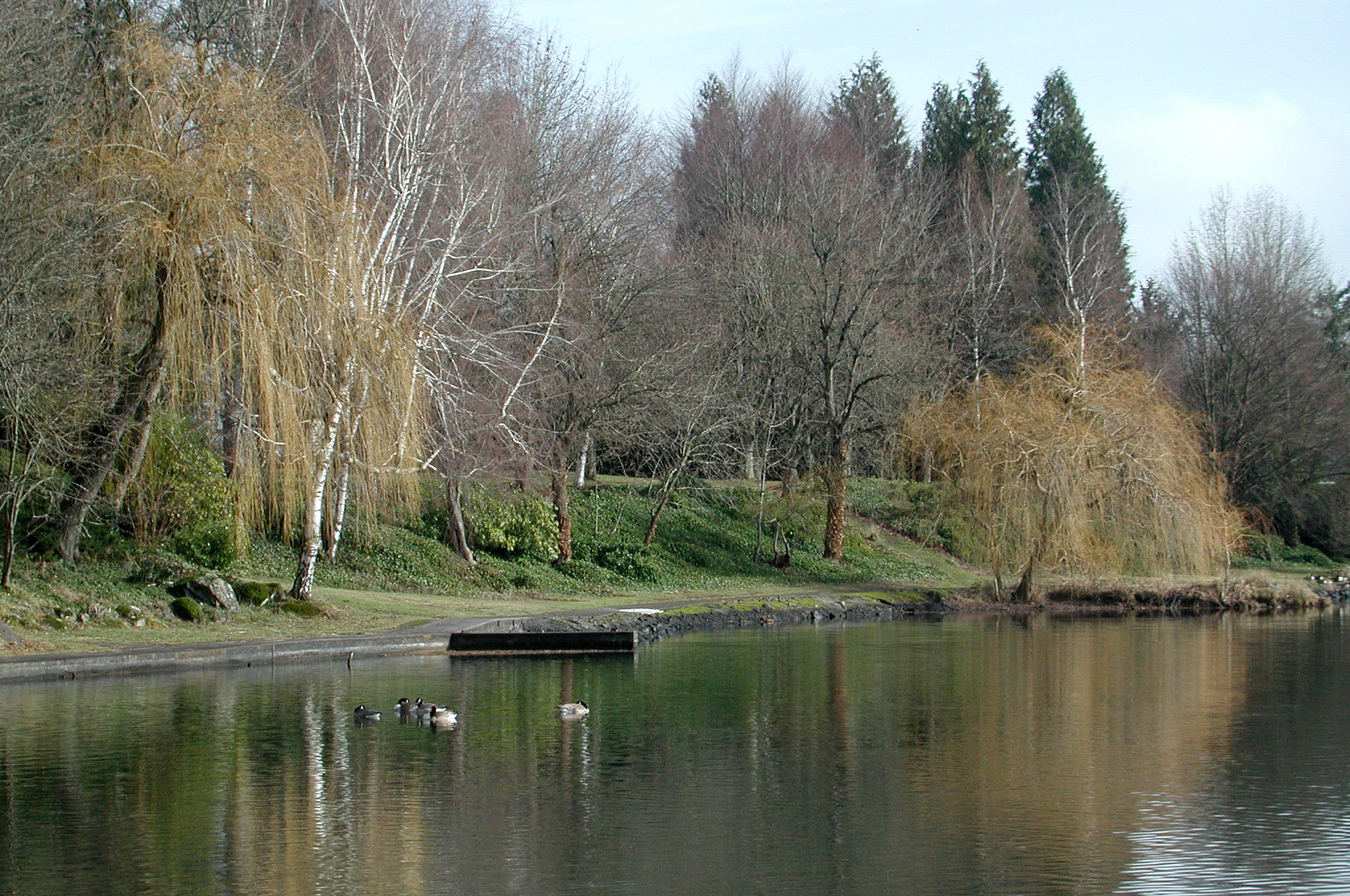
- Shoreline of Blue Lake

- Location within Oregon Location within the United States
- Coordinates: 45°33′06″N 122°26′48″W
- Country: United States
- State: Oregon
- County: Multnomah
- Established: 1930
- Elevation: 43 ft (13 m)
- Time zone: UTC-8 (Pacific (PST))
  - Summer (DST): UTC-7 (PDT)
- ZIP code: 97024
- Area codes: 503 and 971
- GNIS feature ID: 1136408

Interlachen is an unincorporated community in Multnomah County, Oregon, United States. It is situated between Blue Lake and Fairview Lake, just south of Blue Lake Regional Park and north of Fairview.

The community has approximately 140 property owners, and the homeowners' association was established in 1930. The community's homeowners' association (HOA) believes that Interlachen has the oldest continuously operating HOA in Oregon.

== History ==
Circa 1830, the Interlachen ridge area was the main burial ground of the Nichaqwli people, who were a Chinookan band of Native Americans.

The Blue and Fairview lakes area came to the attention of a group of businessmen from Portland and Gresham in the mid-1920s. They wanted to build the Fairview Country Club on the shores of Blue Lake to take advantage of the lakes' recreational potential. The Portland News-Telegram reported that the private club would include lodges, sports facilities and a club house. The country club was never established because of the Great Depression and what eventually became Blue Lake Regional Park passed into private ownership.

A road, Ridge Avenue, ran along the one-mile natural rock dike known as Interlachen Ridge that separated the two lakes. People began building summer cottages and then permanent homes along Ridge Avenue, now Interlachen Lane, in the 1920s. On December 4, 1930, a homeowners' association was formed to provide residents with water and other services.
