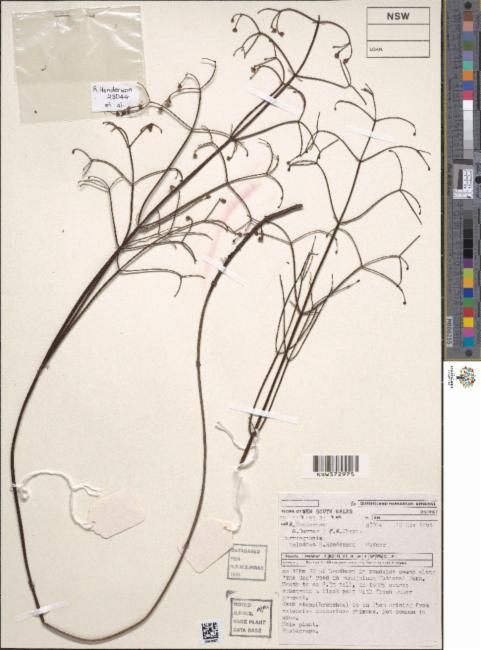
- specimen NSW372975 image CC-BY 4.0, National Herbarium of New South Wales

Conservation status
- Least Concern (NCA)

Scientific classification
- Kingdom: Plantae
- Clade: Tracheophytes
- Clade: Angiosperms
- Clade: Eudicots
- Clade: Asterids
- Order: Gentianales
- Family: Rubiaceae
- Subfamily: Rubioideae
- Tribe: Anthospermeae
- Genus: Durringtonia; R.J.F.Hend. & Guymer
- Species: D. paludosa

Binomial name
- Durringtonia paludosa R.J.F.Hend. & Guymer
- Isotype site (Allan Herbarium CHR 447304: Moreton Island, QLD)'"`UNIQ--ref-00000004-QINU`"'

= Durringtonia =

Genus of plants

Durringtonia is a monotypic genus of flowering plants in the family Rubiaceae. The genus contains only one species, viz. Durringtonia paludosa, which is endemic to Australia (northeastern New South Wales and southeastern Queensland).

The genus and the species were first described in 1985 by Rodney Henderson and Gordon Guymer. The genus name honours Lorraine Durrington who first collected this "insignificant-looking and rare plant in a swamp on the island".

== Habitat ==
It is found growing in sedgelands, in coastal swamps, as the species epithet, paludosus which comes from the Latin palus (swamp, marsh, bog, fen), implies: "growing in bogs or boggy ground".
