= Blue Lake (Canterbury) =

Lake in Canterbury, New Zealand

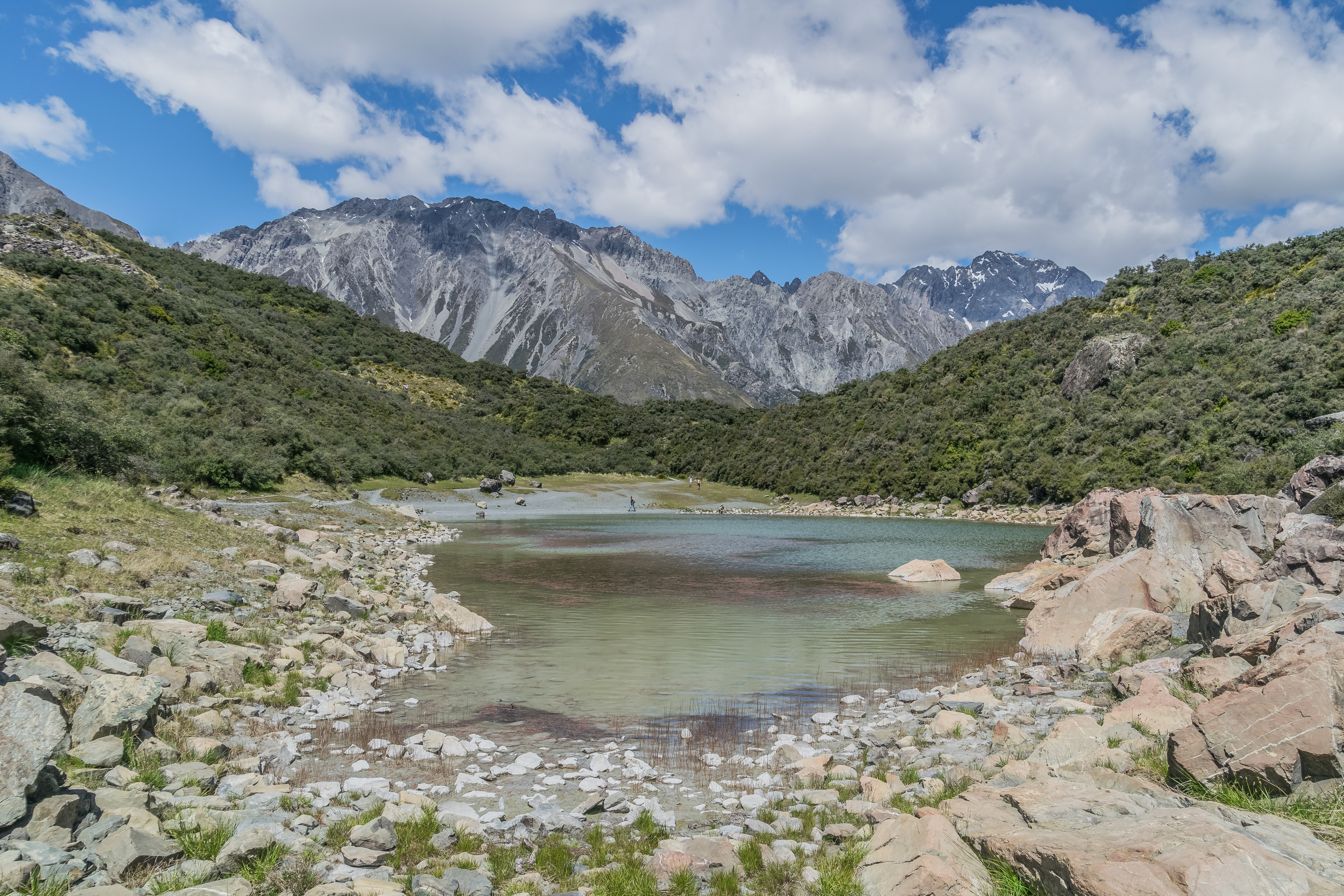
- Blue Lake in Mount Cook National Park

- Location within South Island
- Location: Canterbury, South Island
- Coordinates: 43.6955°S 170.1660°E
- Primary outflows: Tasman River
- Basin countries: New Zealand
- Max. depth: 277m (909 ft)

Blue Lake is a small lake at the foot of the Tasman Glacier in inland Canterbury, in the central South Island of New Zealand. Its outflow is the Tasman River, part of the Waitaki River system.
