= Blue Lake (Hubbard County, Minnesota) =

Lake in the state of Minnesota, United States

- Location within Minnesota
- Location: Hubbard County, Minnesota
- Coordinates: 47°1′2″N 95°0′18″W
- Type: Lake
- Surface elevation: 1,444 feet (440 m)

Blue Lake is a lake in Hubbard County, in the U.S. state of Minnesota.

Blue Lake was so named on account of the blueish tint of its waters.

== See also ==
- List of lakes in Minnesota
