= Blue Lake (Sebring, Florida) =

Lake in the state of Florida, United States

- Location within Florida Location within the United States
- Location: south of Sebring, Florida, just east of County Road 635
- Coordinates: 27°26′07″N 81°30′42″W
- Type: natural freshwater lake
- Basin countries: United States
- Max. length: 1,460 ft (450 m)
- Max. width: 1,440 ft (440 m)
- Surface area: 33.76 acres (14 ha)
- Max. depth: 102 ft (31 m)
- Surface elevation: 114 ft (35 m)

Blue Lake, an almost-round lake, has a surface area of 33.76 acres (13.66 ha). This lake is south of Sebring, Florida, and inside the southeast part of Highlands Hammock State Park. The area immediately surrounding it is rural, but there are housing developments scattered through the area in which the lake is located.

Blue Lake provides public access along its entire shore. The public is allowed to access Highlands Hammock State Park and therefore Blue Lake daily from dawn to dusk. There is no information about the types of fish in this lake. A parking area and four shelter houses with picnic tables are on the northwest side of Blue Lake.

Sometimes this lake is confused with another Blue Lake, which is located just north of Lake Placid, Florida, further south and also in Highlands County.
