= Blue Lake (Queensland) =

Lake in Queensland, Australia

- Karboora
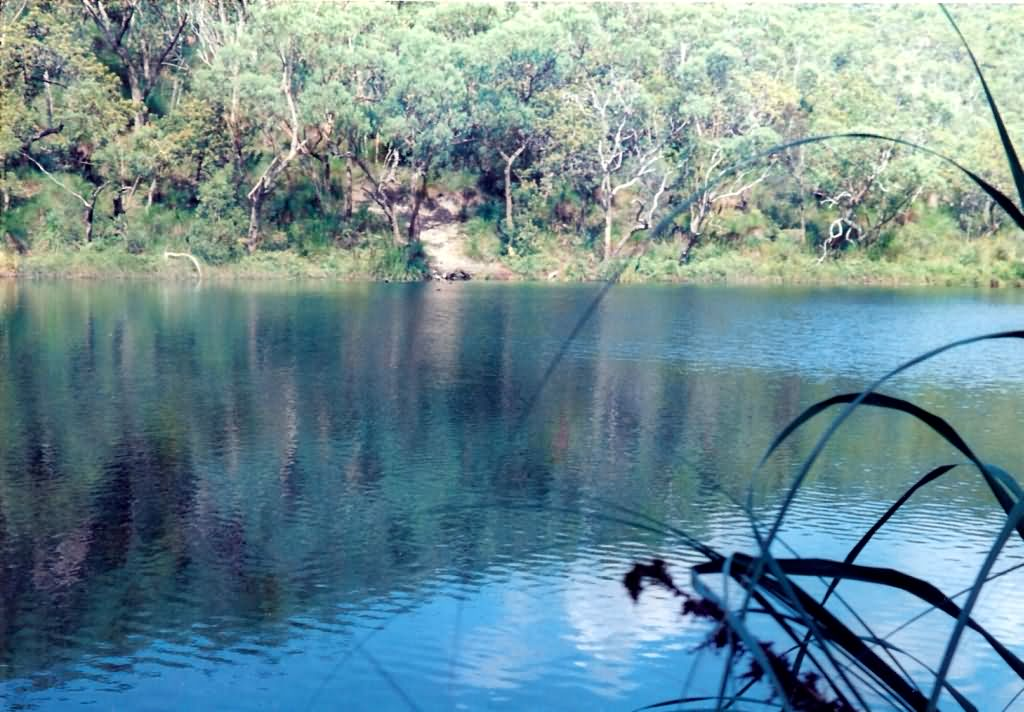
- The undeveloped shores surrounding the lake are very natural

- Location within Queensland
- Location: North Stradbroke Island, Queensland
- Coordinates: 27°31′51″S 153°28′36″E
- Type: Window lake
- Basin countries: Australia
- Surface area: 7.3 ha (18 acres)
- Max. depth: 9.4 m (31 ft)

Blue Lake is a lake located on North Stradbroke Island in the Australian state of Queensland about 44 kilometres (27 mi) east of the state capital of Brisbane.

The lake which is known as a "window lake" and is just under 10 metres (33 ft) deep when full. Water from the lake overflows into the Eighteen Mile Swamp. The aboriginal name for Blue Lake is Karboora.

Environmental studies have revealed the lake has been uniquely stable for thousands of years. Blue Lake was the focus for research on environmental change in which numerous indicators such as water discharge, water quality, pollen and algae samples were examined to understand the history of the lake.

The lake is home to the Ornate_rainbowfish also known as the soft spined sunfish

In 1980, the lake was described in the entry on the now-defunct Register of the National Estate for the Blue Lake National Park as follows:

Blue Lake is a watertable lake in the coastal sandmass of North Stradbroke Island.

Although only relatively small, Blue Lake contains a diversity of habitats & species, including: Blue Lake, a boomerang-shaped watertable window lake; Tortoise Lagoon, a perched lake receding to swamp that fluctuates between swamp and a lagoon depending on rainfall; and other swamps; examples of dry sclerophyll forest, scrub heath, marshes, herbfields, associated linear swamps with surrounding eucalypt open forest and mallee heath. Such a wide range of features represents a large diversity of habitats.

The eastern tip of Blue Lake lies 1.75km from the ocean at which point a white-sandy bottomed, fast flowing creek with steep fern covered banks, carries the Blue Lake overflow down to Eighteen Mile Swamp. Two creeks that flow permanently, and a swamp, drain into the lake. The deepest parts of the lake reach around 11m in depth.

Two crustacean species, three fresh water fish, one frog species, 12 insect species and one spider were found in the littoral of Blue Lake. Most of the littoral and planktonic insects found in Blue Lake are common and widespread throughout Australia.
