= Lac Bleu de Lesponne =

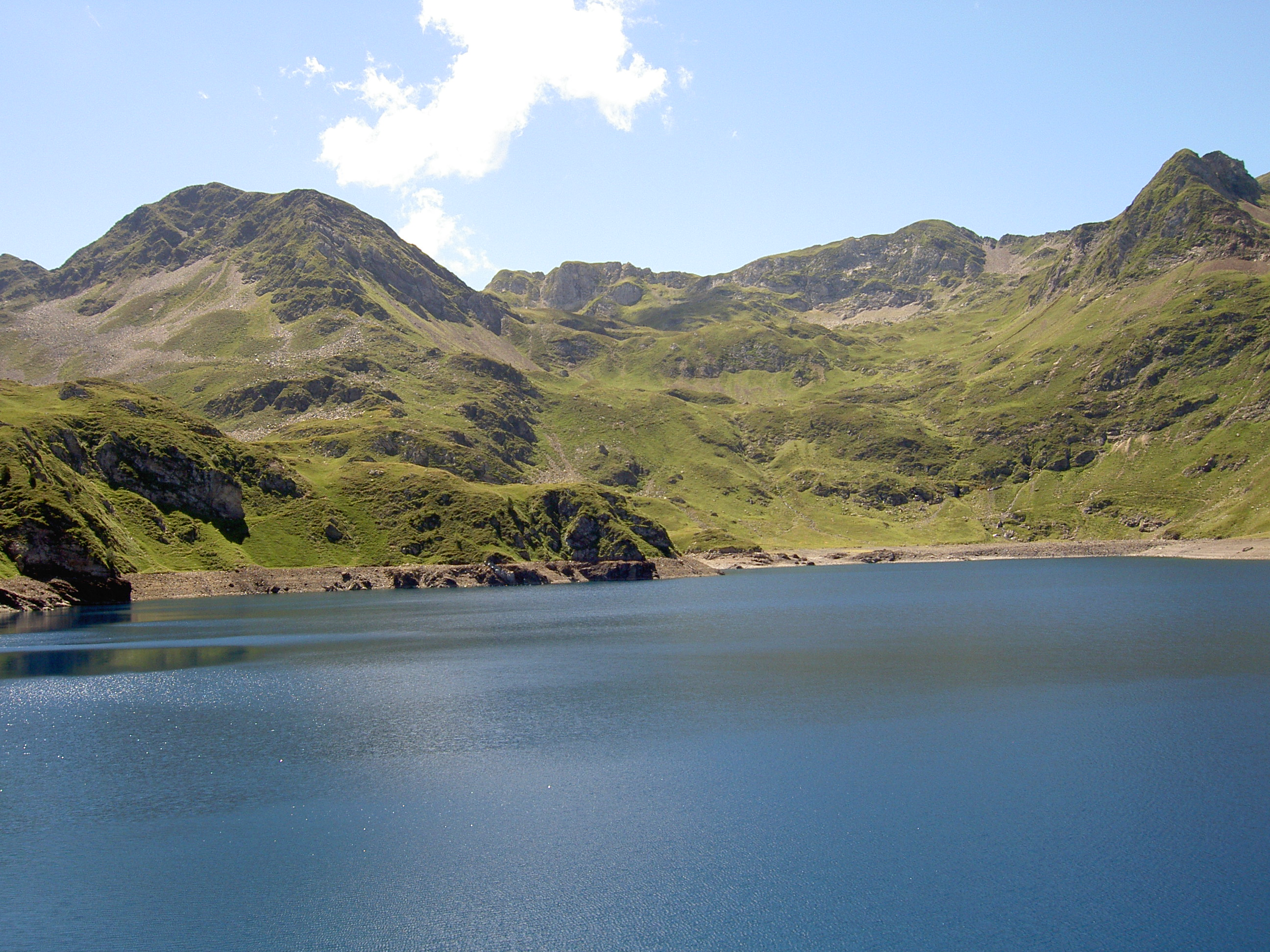

- Location within Pyrenees
- Location: Hautes-Pyrénées
- Coordinates: 42.93672°N 0.080166°E
- Type: reservoir
- Basin countries: France
- Surface area: 0.51 km^{2} (0.20 sq mi)
- Max. depth: 121 m (397 ft)
- Surface elevation: 1,977 m (6,486 ft)

Lac Bleu de Lesponne is a lake in Hautes-Pyrénées, France. At an elevation of 1977 m, its surface area is 0.51 km².
