= Blue Lake (Madera County, California) =

Lake in the state of California, United States

- Location within California Location within the United States
- Location: Madera County, California
- Coordinates: 37°40′48″N 119°16′57″W
- Type: Lake
- Surface elevation: 10,528 feet (3,209 m)

Blue Lake is a lake in Madera County, California, in the United States.

The name is likely descriptive.

== See also ==
- List of lakes in California
