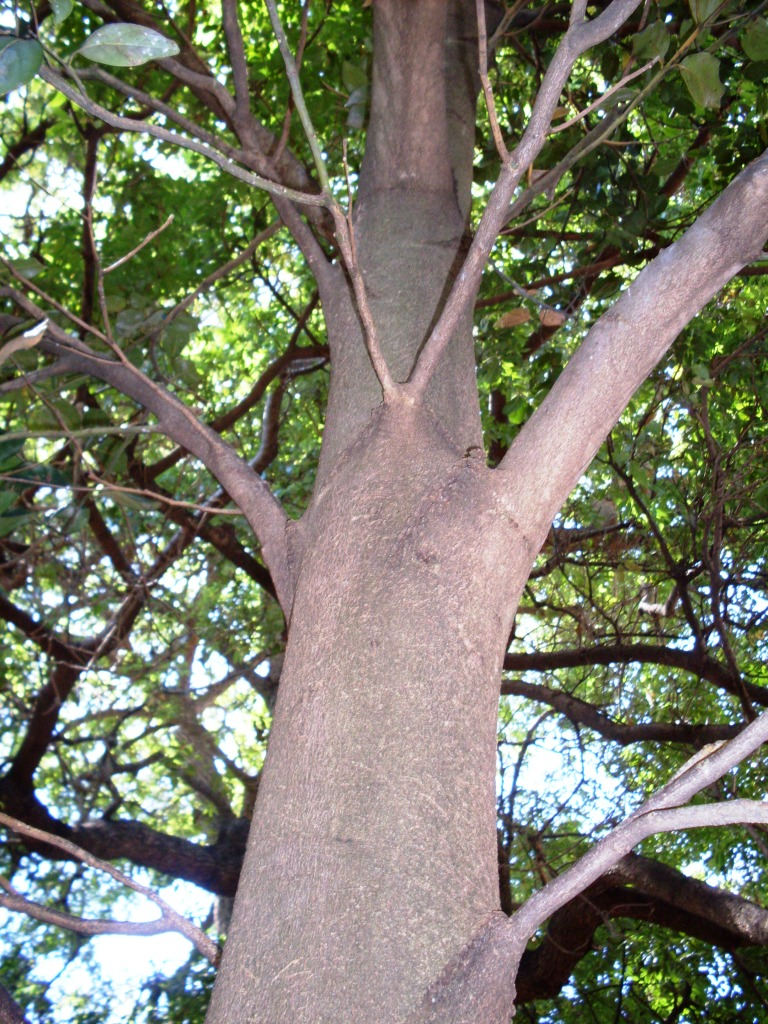
- Stinking laurel

Conservation status
- Vulnerable (EPBC Act)

Scientific classification
- Kingdom: Plantae
- Clade: Tracheophytes
- Clade: Angiosperms
- Clade: Magnoliids
- Order: Laurales
- Family: Lauraceae
- Genus: Cryptocarya
- Species: C. foetida

Binomial name
- Cryptocarya foetida R.T.Baker

= Cryptocarya foetida =

Species of tree

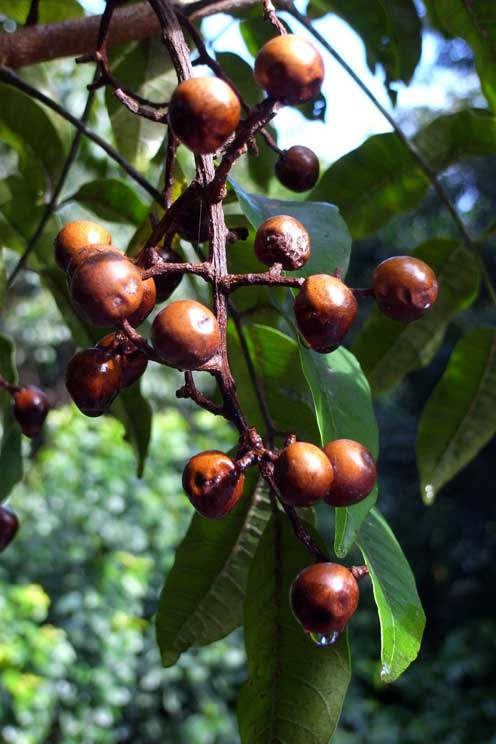
Fruit in the Royal Botanic Garden, Sydney

Cryptocarya foetida, commonly known as stinking cryptocarya or stinking laurel, is a species of flowering plant in the family Lauraceae and is endemic to eastern Australia. It is a small to medium-sized tree with egg-shaped to elliptic leaves, cream coloured, unpleasantly perfumed, tube-shaped flowers, and spherical black to purplish drupes.

== Description ==
Cryptocarya foetida is a small or medium-sized tree that typically grows to a height of up to 25 m (82 ft), the stem not butressed with a trunk dbh of 25 cm (9.8 in). The leaves are egg-shaped to elliptic or oval, 8–150 mm (0.31–5.91 in) long and 33–44 mm (1.3–1.7 in) wide on a petiole 6–10 mm (0.24–0.39 in) long. Both surfaces of the leaves are glabrous with prominent veins, and the lower surface is paler. The flowers are arranged in dense panicles that are shorter than the leaves, the perianth tube 1.1–1.2 mm (0.043–0.047 in) long and 1.5–1.7 mm (0.059–0.067 in) wide. The tepals are 1.7–1.9 mm (0.067–0.075 in) long and 0.8–0.9 mm (0.031–0.035 in) wide, the outer anthers 0.7–0.8 mm (0.028–0.031 in) long and 0.5–0.6 mm (0.020–0.024 in) wide, the inner anthers 0.8 mm (0.031 in) long and 0.4 mm (0.016 in) wide. Flowering mainly occurs in February, and the fruit is a spherical black to purplish-black drupe, 8–13 mm (0.31–0.51 in) long and 8–15 mm (0.31–0.59 in) wide.

== Taxonomy ==
Cryptocarya foetida was first formally described in 1905 by Richard Thomas Baker in the Proceedings of the Linnean Society of New South Wales. The specific epithet (foetida) is a Latin word meaning 'stinking' or 'evil-smelling.

== Distribution and habitat ==
Stinking cryptocarya occurs from east of Gympie in southern Queensland to Iluka in northern New South Wales, where it grows in littoral rainforest on old sand dunes.

== Conservation status ==
This species of Cryptocarya is listed as "vulnerable" under the Australian Government Environment Protection and Biodiversity Conservation Act 1999 and the New South Wales Government Biodiversity Conservation Act 2016. The main threats to the species are its small population size, clearing and fragmentation of habitat, and weed invasion.

== Gallery ==
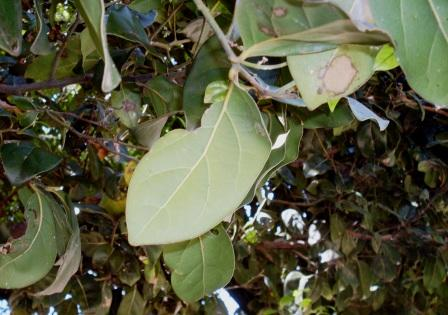
Leaves

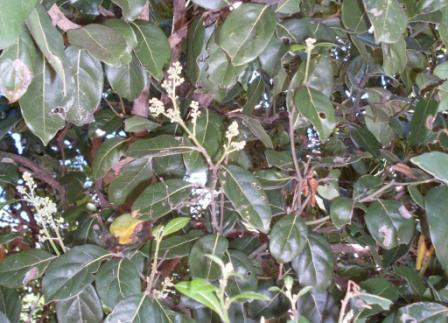
Fowers and leaves
