= Blue Lake Regional Park =

Regional park in Oregon, United States

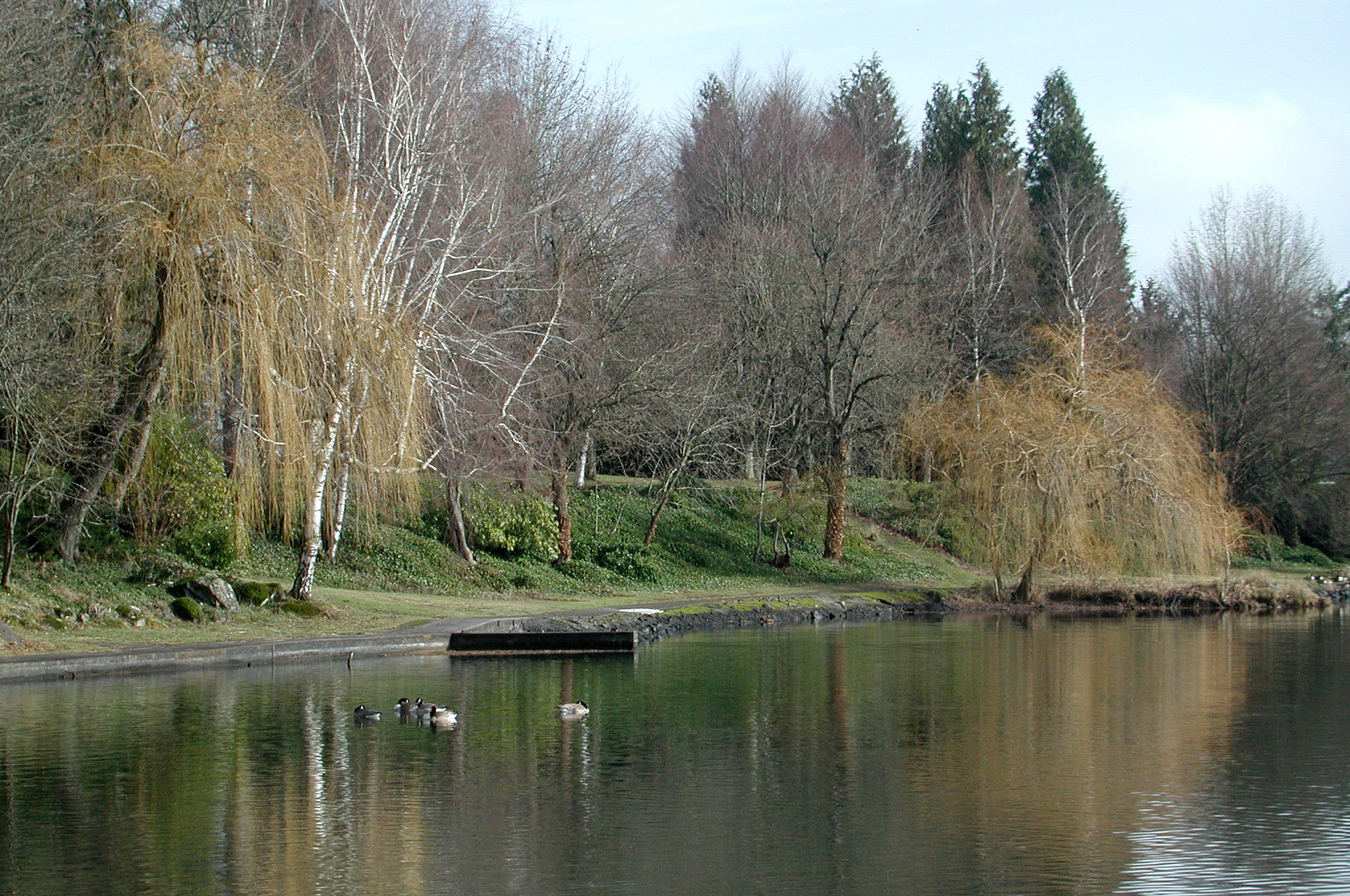
- Shoreline in winter
- Interactive map of Blue Lake Regional Park
- Type: Urban park
- Location: Fairview, Multnomah County, Oregon
- Coordinates: 45.5565082°N 122.4481473°W
- Area: 101 acres (41 ha)
- Operator: Metro regional government
- Open: 8 a.m. to legal sunset. Entrance fee except for pedestrians and bicyclists. Closed on Christmas and New Year's Day.

Blue Lake Regional Park is a public park in Fairview, in the U.S. state of Oregon. The 101-acre (41 ha) park, near the south shore of the Columbia River in Multnomah County, includes many covered and uncovered picnic areas, playing fields for sports such as softball, a cross country course (home course for Portland State Vikings cross country) and infrastructure related to lake recreation including swimming, boating, and fishing. Encompassing wooded areas, three ponds, and a wetland in addition to the lake, the park is frequented by migrating birds and other wildlife. Paved paths run through the park, which is near the 40-Mile Loop hiking and biking trail. Park vegetation includes cottonwoods, willows, and other trees and shrubs as well as wetland plants such as cattails.

The 61-acre (25 ha) lake, which lies in a small artificial drainage basin, has no natural inlet or outlet. Water normally enters the lake only from rain, surface runoff, and groundwater seepage. Excessive aquatic plant life and algae have sometimes restricted the use of the lake, and its maintenance includes plant control and addition of fresh water from municipal wells.

== Location ==
Metro, the regional government for the Oregon part of the Portland metropolitan area, manages the 101-acre (41 ha) park. It lies in Fairview near the south shore of the Columbia River, 3 miles (4.8 km) northwest of Troutdale and 11 miles (18 km) east of the center of Portland in Multnomah County. Marine Drive and the 40-Mile Loop hiking and biking trail pass north of the park, between it and the river. Northwest of the park is McGuire Island, in the Columbia River at 45.5637302°N 122.4650921°W, while Chinook Landing Marine Park lies to the northeast across Marine Drive at 45.5598414°N 122.4428696°W. South of Blue Lake beyond Interlachen Lane is Fairview Lake at 45.5501194°N 122.4484250°W, which drains into the Columbia Slough.

== History ==
William Clark of the Lewis and Clark Expedition stopped here on his return trip in April 1806, and learned from members of the Nichaqwli (or Nechacokee or Ne-cha-co-lee) of the Willamette River. The site was a private park from the 1920s to 1960 when Multnomah County purchased it. Metro took over the operation of Multnomah County's parks on January 1, 1994, and received ownership of them in 1996. A dance hall existed until after Multnomah County's takeover.

== Amenities ==
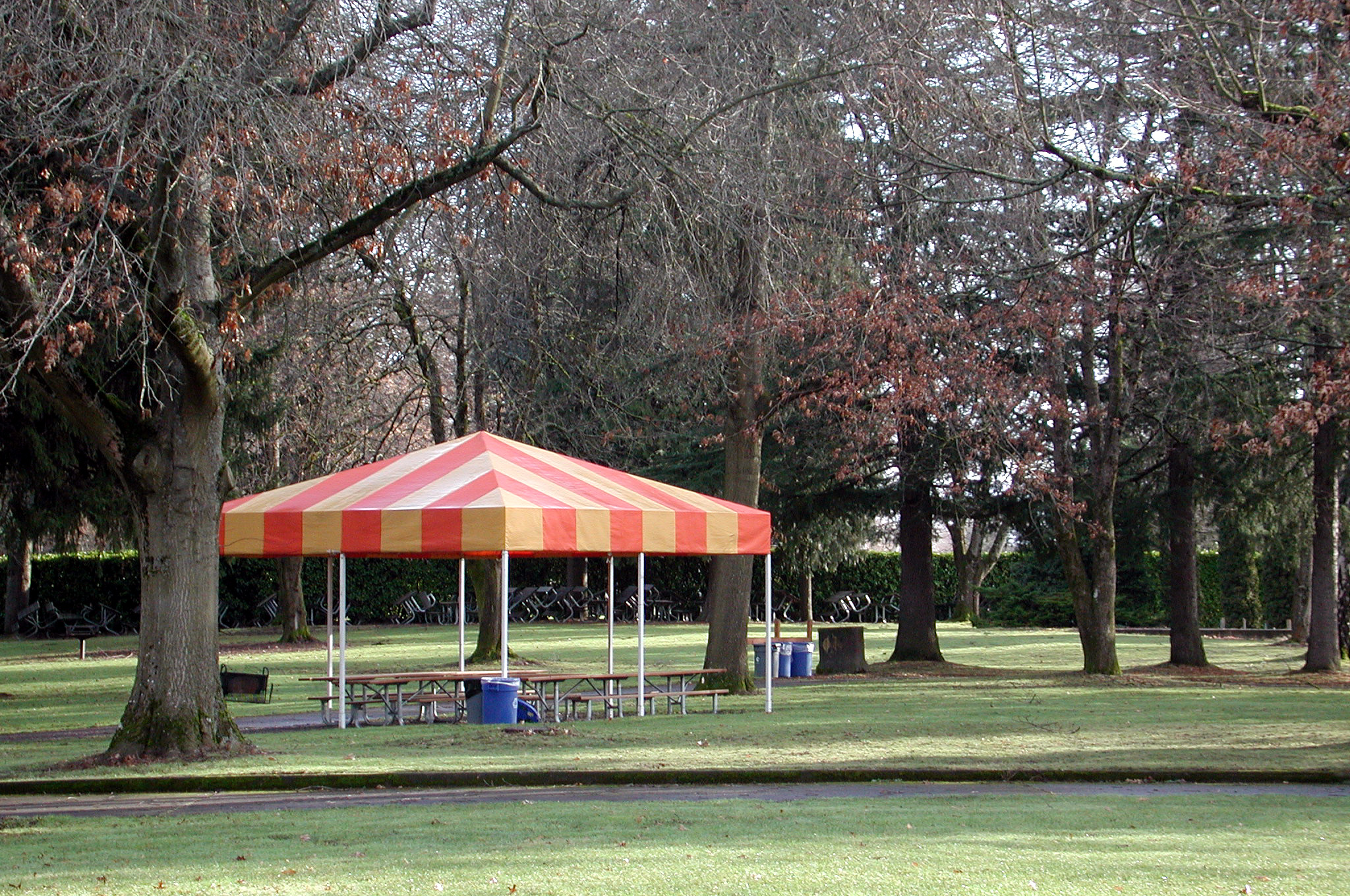
Covered picnic table

Amenities include public restrooms, wheelchair accessibility for most areas, trails, parking, sheltered picnic areas and tables, interpretive signs, and concessions. Activities at the park include hiking, biking, cross country running, swimming, boating, fishing, wildlife viewing, volleyball, basketball, disc golf, archery, and softball. The park has a water-spray playground of about 3,500 square feet (330 m^{2}) that uses municipal well water that is treated and recycled at the park. Sculptures at the west end of the lake commemorate former Chinook villages along the Columbia River. For a fee, Metro offers the use of a 2,080-square-foot (193 m^{2}) structure called The Lake House for banquets, conferences, receptions, recitals, and weddings. The Oregon Department of Fish and Wildlife stocks Blue Lake annually with trout.

Wetland plants near ponds north and west of the lake include cattails and rushes that provide habitat for marsh birds such as red-winged blackbirds. Swallows are common in summer, and American goldfinches and other migratory birds visit the park in large number. Cottonwoods, alders, dogwoods, willows, and conifers grow in the park as do many shrubs including elderberries, spiraea, and Oregon-grape. The park is frequented by muskrats, voles, raccoons, and the occasional coyote.

== Hydrology ==
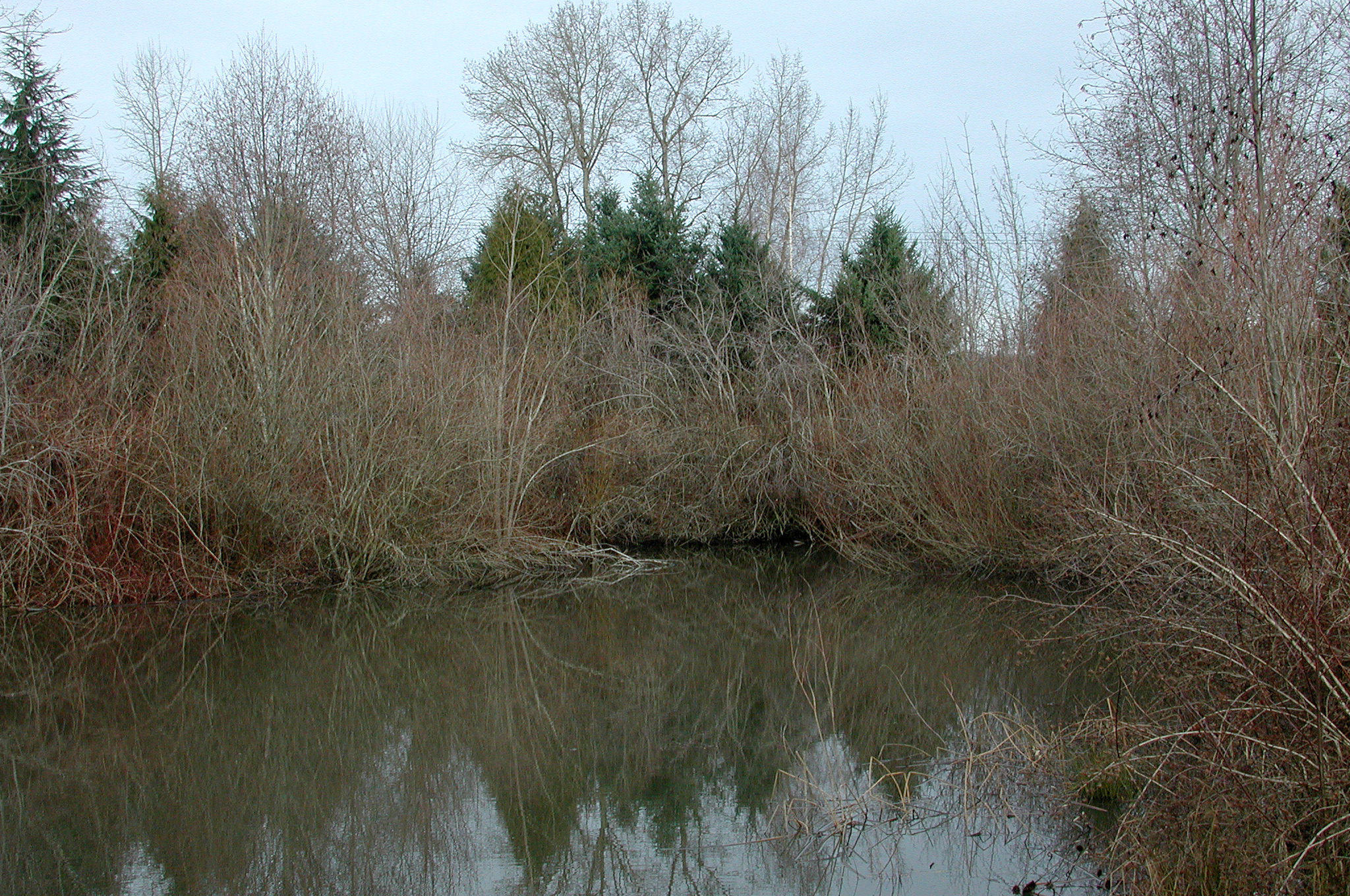
Pond in Blue Lake Regional Park

The lake, which covers 61 acres (25 ha) of the park, lies within its own drainage basin of 128 acres (52 ha), bounded on the north by a levee along the river and by the raised bed of Interlachen Lane on the east and west and a sandstone ridge on the south. Lying 14 feet (4.3 m) above sea level, the lake measures 0.9 miles (1.4 km) along its east-west axis and 0.12 miles (0.19 km) along its north-south axis. Although its maximum depth is 24 feet (7.3 m), about half of the lake is 10 feet (3.0 m) deep or less. Its shoreline totals 2 miles (3.2 km).

Having no surface inlet, the lake receives water naturally only from rain, surface runoff, and groundwater seepage. In addition, water from municipal wells is sometimes pumped into the lake during the dry season; otherwise the lake level might fall as much as 30 inches (76 cm) in late summer. Three small ponds, connected to the lake and to one another by culverts, lie just north of the lake at its west end. Outflow from lake and ponds occurs only when workers release water through a concrete weir to Salmon Creek, in a separate drainage basin to the east. From there the water flows into the Columbia River.

The closed nature of the lake contributes to reduced water quality. Invasive aquatic plants such as Eurasian watermilfoil and curlyleaf pondweed have sometimes restricted use of the lake for swimming, fishing, and boating. In 1998, the Oregon Department of Environmental Quality (DEQ) added the lake to its list of impaired water bodies because it violated the state's standard for alkalinity and supported too many aquatic weeds and algae. As of June 2008, efforts to control weeds without damaging favored plants and other aspects of the lake were continuing.

== See also ==
- List of lakes in Oregon
- Oxbow Regional Park
- Cooper Mountain Nature Park
- Interlachen, Oregon – situated just south of the park

== Works cited ==
- Houck, Mike, and Cody, M.J., eds. (2000). Wild in the City. Portland, Oregon: Oregon Historical Society Press. ISBN 0-87595-273-9.
- Pfauth, Mary, and Sytsma, Mark (2004). "Integrated Aquatic Vegetation Management Plan for Blue Lake, Fairview, Oregon" (pdf). Portland, Oregon: Center for Lakes and Reservoirs, Environmental Sciences and Resources, Portland State University. Retrieved on January 1, 2009.
